= Insurgency in Kabardino-Balkaria and Karachay-Cherkessia =

Conflict in Russia, 1997 to 2007

Insurgency in Kabardino-Balkaria
- Part of Insurgency in the North Caucasus and the second Chechen war
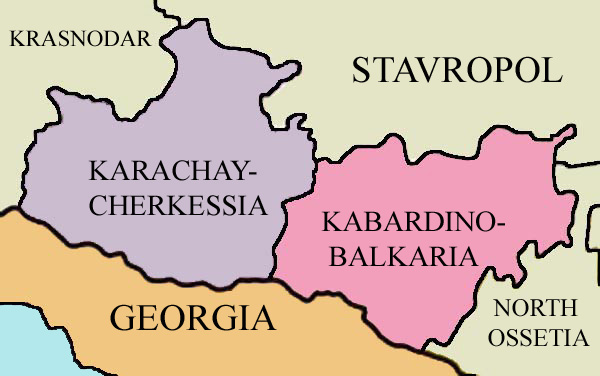
- Map of Kabardino-Balkaria and Karachay-Cherkessia
Date	1997 – 7 February 2017
Location	Kabardino-Balkaria, Karachay-Cherkessia, Russia
Result	Russian victory: Destruction of Caucasus Emirate and other militant groups; Stabilization of the situation in Kabardino-Balkaria; Evolves into the Islamic State insurgency in the North Caucasus

Belligerents
Russia: Kabardino-Balkaria; Karachay-Cherkessia	Karachay Jamaat (until 2007) Jamaat of Kabardino-Balkaria (until 2005): Yarmuk Jamaat(until 2005); Chechen Republic of Ichkeria (until 2007): Caucasian Front (until 2007); Jamaat of Kabardino-Balkaria (from 2005 in Caucasian Front); Yarmuk Jamaat (from 2005 in Caucasian Front); Karachay Jamaat (1995–1999); Caucasus Emirate (from 2007): Vilayat KBK (from 2007)

Commanders and leaders
(Russia) Vladimir Putin (2002–2008; 2012–2017) (Russia) Dmitry Medvedev (2008–2012) (Kabardino-Balkaria) Valery Kokov (2002–2005) (Kabardino-Balkaria) Arsen Kanokov (2005–2013) (Kabardino-Balkaria) Yury Kokov (2013–2017) (Karachay-Cherkessia) Vladimir Semyonov (2002–2003) (Karachay-Cherkessia) Mustafa Batdyyev (2003–2008) (Karachay-Cherkessia) Boris Ebzeyev (2008–2011) (Karachay-Cherkessia) Rashid Temrezov (2011–2017)	(Chechen Republic of Ichkeria) Adam Semyonov †; (Chechen Republic of Ichkeria) Ramazan Borlakov †; (Chechen Republic of Ichkeria) Achemez Gochiyaev; (Chechen Republic of Ichkeria) Idris Glow †; (Chechen Republic of Ichkeria) Nikolay Kipkeev; (Chechen Republic of Ichkeria) Aslan Temirbulatov †; (Chechen Republic of Ichkeria) Ruslan Khubiev †; (Chechen Republic of Ichkeria) Hasanbi Fakov †; (Chechen Republic of Ichkeria) Muslim Atayev (Emir Sayfullah) †; (Chechen Republic of Ichkeria) Rustam Bekanov †; (Chechen Republic of Ichkeria) Anzor Astemirov (Emir Sayfullah) †; (Chechen Republic of Ichkeria) Musa Mukozhev †; Asker Dzhappuyev (Emir Abdullah); Alim Zankishiev (Emir Ubaidallah) †; Timur Tatchaev (Emir Khamza) †; Ruslan Baryrbekov (Emir Khamza) †; Khasanbi Fakov (Emir Abu Khasan) †; Tengiz Guketlov (Emir Tengiz) †; Astemir Berkhamov (Emir Al Bara) †; Robert Zankishiev (Emir Abdullah) †; Zalim Shebzukhov (Emir Salim); (Chechen Republic of Ichkeria) Shamil Basayev; (Chechen Republic of Ichkeria) Ibn al Khattab; (Chechen Republic of Ichkeria) Ilyas Gorchkhanov †; (Chechen Republic of Ichkeria) Dokku Umarov

Strength
(Russia) Undisclosed (Kabardino-Balkaria) 5 groups (Karachay-Cherkessia) 3 groups	~300 militants (1997); ~700+ militants (1999); ~500 militants (2002–2007); ~50–180 militants annually (2009–2015)

Casualties and losses
1,000+ killed and injured	1,000+ killed and injured
- Thousands of civilians killed and wounded

The Insurgency in Kabardino-Balkaria and Karachay-Cherkessia was a protracted conflict between Russian security forces and militant groups operating in the regions of Kabardino-Balkaria and Karachay-Cherkessia, located in the North Caucasus region of Russia. The conflict was part of the broader insurgency in the North Caucasus, which emerged following the end of the First Chechen War in 1996.

== Background ==
The roots of the insurgency in Kabardino-Balkaria and Karachay-Cherkessia can be traced back to the Chechen Wars of the 1990s. The withdrawal of Russian troops from Chechnya in 1996 created a power vacuum in the region, leading to the rise of various militant groups with separatist and Islamist agendas. These groups, including the Karachay Jamaat, Jamaat of Kabardino-Balkaria and Caucasus Emirate and its affiliates, sought to establish an independent Islamic state in the North Caucasus and wage jihad against the Russian government.

== Origin ==
Kabardino-Balkaria:

The militant group in Kabardino-Balkaria began as a moderate non-violent organization named the Islamic Center in 1993. The group was renamed the Jamaat of Kabardino-Balkaria when it was not allowed to re-register under the original name in 1997. The focus of the group gradually changed because of persecution by Valery Kokov, the long-time ruler of the Republic of Kabardino-Balkaria, who labeled all alternatives to the local branch of the Spiritual Board of Russia's Muslims, operating the only official mosque in the republic, as Wahhabis, and indiscriminately and brutally harassed them.

Yarmuk was founded as a unit of around 30 Balkars and Kabardinians led by Muslim Atayev (Emir Sayfullah), which trained at the Chechen warlord Ruslan Gelayev's camp in Pankisi Gorge, Georgia. In 2002 the group helped Gelayev's forces in a raid of the village of Galashki in the Republic of Ingushetia. Upon their return to Kabardino-Balkaria, Atayev and his men launched a recruitment drive among alienated and radicalized youth. Mounting pressure from a continued crackdown led the group's leader, Mussa Mukozhoyev (Musa Mukozhev), to join the underground. Many local young radicals had joined the Islamic Peacekeeping Army that invaded the republic of Dagestan from Chechnya in 1999 or fought on the Chechen separatist side in the Second Chechen War.

Radical Chechen commander Shamil Basayev maintained close ties with the local Salafis, living in the town of Baksan for more than a month in 2003, before narrowly escaping a police raid. An Ingush would-be suicide bomber, Zarema Muzhakhoyeva, lived in the republic's capital of Nalchik before going on a failed suicide mission to Moscow. A Nalchik resident housed the alleged organizer of the August 2004 bombing in the Moscow metro.

Karachay-Cherkessia:

The Karachay Jamaat was founded in 1995 in the Karachay-Cherkess Republic of Russia. It emerged during a time of growing Islamist radicalism in the North Caucasus, influenced by Salafism, a strict interpretation of Islam. After the collapse of the Soviet Union, many Muslim communities in the region turned to religious identity for guidance, leading to the rise of groups like the Karachay Jamaat.

Early Leadership and Growth:

The group was initially led by Adam Semyonov, an imam who preached Salafist ideas. However, as the group became more radical, leadership passed to Ramazan Borlakov. In the mid-1990s, Borlakov traveled to several Arab countries, where he found financial backing to open a madrasah (Islamic school) in Uchkeken, Karachay-Cherkessia. His sermons grew more radical, criticizing the Russian government for oppressing Muslims and calling for them to live under Sharia law.

Links to Jihadist Networks:

In the late 1990s, Borlakov established contacts with Khattab, an Arab militant leader fighting in Chechnya, and Bagautdin Dagestani, a leader of Dagestan's Wahhabi militants. He sent his followers to Khattab's training camps, forming the Karachay Battalion, a group that took part in the Second Chechen War.

Key Figures:

• Adam Semyonov: The founder of Karachay Jamaat.

• Ramazan Borlakov: The main figure behind the radicalization of the Karachay Jamaat.

• Achemez Gochiyaev: One of Borlakov's followers, suspected of organizing the 1999 Russian apartment bombings.

• Khyzyr Salpagarov: Took over as leader in 1998 and expanded the group's militant activities.

other key figures:

- Idris Glow
- Nikolay Kipkeev
- Aslan Temirbulatov
- Ruslan Khubiev
- Hasanbi Fakov

By the late 1990s, the Karachay Jamaat had become a militant organization focused on resisting Russian rule and establishing Sharia law in the region.

== Insurgency ==
Kabardino-Balkaria:

-Early militant activity: In August 2004 Yarmuk announced the beginning of military operations in the republic. Their online manifesto rejected terrorism, referring to alleged government responsibility for the 1999 Russian apartment bombings ("We are not fighting against women or children, like Russian invaders are doing in Ichkeria. We are not blowing up sleeping people, like FSB of the Russian Federation does"). The manifesto noted the corruption of the "mafia clans" that led the republic ("These mere apologies for rulers, who sold themselves to the invaders, have made drug addiction, prostitution, poverty, crime, depravity, drunkenness and unemployment prosper in our Republic").

Yarmuk launched its first attack in Kabardino-Balkaria that same month, ambushing policemen in Chegem district. A turning point came in December 2004, when Yarmuk members conducted a raid on the office of the federal drug control agency in Nalchik, during which they seized large quantities of weapons and ammunition. The founding leader of Yarmuk, Muslim Atayev, was killed when the police stormed an apartment in Nalchik in January 2005. The organization continued to operate, staging attacks under the leadership of his successor, Rustam Bekanov. He was killed three months later and was replaced by Anzor Astemirov, a former deputy director of the Islamic Center. The group's base of operations was Nalchik and the Balkarian enclave around Mount Elbrus.

-Nalchik raid and aftermath: Yarmuk was the main force involved in the botched raid by around 100–200 mostly untrained militants on the capital Nalchik in 2005, during which more than 140 people, including 89 alleged insurgents, were killed. Scores of suspects were detained after the attack, and at least 52 were put on trial. The Jamaat apparently lost most of its members, including the deputy leader Ilyas Gorchkhanov. Survivors retrenched, and in late 2007 were subsumed into the United Vilayet of Kabarada, Balkaria and Karachay that would operate not only in Kabardino-Balkaria but also in the neighboring republic of Karachay–Cherkessia after the destruction of its native Karachay Jamaat. The number of attacks attributed to Vilayet KBK at that time had been relatively low, being mostly targeted assassinations such as that of Anatoly Kyarov. One exception was the shooting of a group of nine Russian hunters in November 2007. The militants systematically kept recruiting new fighters and gathering weapons.

-Surge of violence: Following the killing of the group's leader Anzor Astemirov in March 2010, the leadership was assumed by more aggressive young commanders like the Baksan area-based Asker Dzhappuyev and the south-west sector commander Ratmir Shameyev, who regrouped Vilayet KBK and changed its tactics. The group went on to perpetrate two high-profile bombings: a blast at the Nalchik hippodrome that injured two ministers during May Day festivities and a sabotage attack on the Baksan hydroelectric power station that inflicted significant economic damage in July. The group was also involved in a large number of near-daily attacks directed against members of security forces. According to a statement made by the Russian federal Interior Minister Rashid Nurgaliyev in November 2010, "the highest level of the terrorist threat in the North Caucasus is in the republics of Dagestan and Kabardino-Balkaria", as the KBR saw six times more gun attacks and nearly five times more explosions in 2010 as in the same period of 2009. The Vilayet KBK fighters began to simultaneously act as a Taliban-style morality police, targeting alleged "dens of vice". Between March and May 2011, the Russian Security Services killed nearly the entire leadership of the Vilayet, including overall Emir Asker Dzhappuyev, Emir Zakaria of the southwestern sector and Emir Abdul Jabbar of the Northeastern Sector.

-Low level insurgency: The death of so many commanders led to a decline in the number of rebel attacks in Kabardino-Balkaria, mostly taking the form of attacks on local police officials and police stations. In September 2011 Alim Zankishiev (aka Emir Ubaidallah) became the new leader of the rebels, he was killed by Russian security forces in March 2012. A security operation in Nalchik in September 2012 again saw the killing of several senior commanders (Emir Hamza of the North-Western sector and acting leader of the group, Emir Abdal-Malik of the North-Eastern sector and Shamil Ulbashev, Emir of the Central Sector) in a single operation. Ruslan Baryrbekov (also using the Nom de guerre Amir Khamza) briefly became leader before being killed in September 2012 when Khasanbi Fakov became emir. Fakov was killed by security forces in August 2013 in Nalchik, as was his successor Tengiz Guketlov in March 2014.

Vilayat KBK suffered a split in August 2015, with Robert Zankishiev joining Caucasus Emirate commanders in other North Caucasus republics in pledging allegiance to the Islamic State of Iraq and the Levant (ISIL) leader Abu Bakr al-Baghdadi, while Zalim Shebzukhov led those who retained loyalty to the Caucasus Emirate. Both commanders were killed by Russian security forces in operations in November 2015 and August 2016 respectively.

Karachay-Cherkessia:

The Karachay Jamaat was responsible for significant violence in Karachay-Cherkessia and the wider North Caucasus region, primarily from the mid-1990s through the 2010s. This insurgent group, founded in 1995, became a key player in the spread of Salafism and Islamist extremism. Its activities included assassinations, bombings, and large-scale terrorist attacks.

1. Formation of the Karachay Battalion and its Role in Terrorism

• Under the leadership of Ramazan Borlakov, the Karachay Battalion was formed in the late 1990s. It consisted of militants trained in the camps of the notorious Chechen-Arab warlord Khattab. These militants were not only involved in local skirmishes and attacks but also participated in major terrorist operations across the North Caucasus.

• The Karachay Battalion played a direct role in combat during the Second Chechen War (1999-2009), launching attacks on Russian troops and government installations. Their operations in Chechnya were part of a larger effort to destabilize the region and push for the establishment of an Islamic state under Sharia law.

2. 1999 Russian Apartment Bombings

• One of the most devastating attacks linked to the Karachay Jamaat's network, particularly through Achemez Gochiyaev, was the 1999 Russian apartment bombings. These bombings targeted residential buildings in Moscow, Buynaksk, and Volgodonsk, killing over 300 civilians. The attacks were a pivotal moment, as they contributed to the start of the Second Chechen War and greatly intensified the Russian government's response to the North Caucasus insurgencies.

• Although the extent of Gochiyaev's involvement is debated, he remains one of the key figures suspected of orchestrating these bombings. The violence shocked the Russian public and demonstrated the far-reaching capabilities of North Caucasus insurgents to carry out mass-casualty attacks far beyond their home regions.

3. Assassinations and Targeted Killings

• Throughout the 2000s, the Karachay Jamaat frequently used targeted assassinations as a means of destabilizing the local administration and eliminating figures who cooperated with Russian authorities. One of the most notable assassinations was the 2007 killing of Mukharbi Cherkesov, the head of the anti-organized crime department in Karachay-Cherkessia. Cherkesov was a high-profile figure known for his efforts to combat criminal and insurgent networks in the republic. His assassination demonstrated the insurgents’ ability to target well-guarded officials with impunity.

• Other assassinations included local imams, police officers, and politicians who were seen as collaborators with the Russian state. These killings fostered a climate of fear and intimidation, further destabilizing the region.

4. 2004 Moscow Metro Bombing

• Another significant attack tied to the Karachay Jamaat leadership, specifically Nikolay Kipkeev, was the 2004 Moscow Metro bombing. On February 6, 2004, a bomb detonated in the Avtozavodskaya metro station, killing 41 people and injuring over 100. Kipkeev was one of the key organizers behind this attack. This bombing showed the Jamaat's reach beyond the North Caucasus, striking at the heart of Russia's capital and causing mass civilian casualties.

5. Insurgency in Karachay-Cherkessia and Neighboring Regions

• Beyond high-profile terrorist attacks, the Karachay Jamaat engaged in numerous smaller-scale acts of violence, including ambushes on police patrols, attacks on military checkpoints, and bombings targeting government facilities. These attacks were typically carried out by small cells operating in the mountainous and rural areas of Karachay-Cherkessia, where the terrain made it easier for militants to hide and launch operations.

• Local businesses and officials who refused to comply with the Jamaat's demands for protection money or support were often attacked, with bombings or arson targeting their properties.

6. Unification and Intensification of Insurgent Activity

• After the 2007 unification of the Karachay Jamaat with the Kabardino-Balkarian Jamaat to form the United Vilayat of Kabarda, Balkaria, and Karachay, the violence intensified in the region. This unification allowed for better coordination between insurgent cells, leading to larger and more coordinated attacks on Russian security forces and infrastructure.

• Shootouts between insurgents and Russian forces became more frequent in the early 2010s, with many militants being killed in counterterrorism operations. For example, Russian forces frequently targeted militants hiding in the mountainous regions, leading to heavy firefights and casualties on both sides.

Russian security forces responded with aggressive counterterrorism operations, targeting key leaders of the Jamaat. By the mid-2010s, many leaders had been killed or captured, weakening the group's operational capacity. However, smaller cells continued sporadic attacks into the later years.

Despite the decline in violence, the insurgency left a lasting impact on the region, fueled by radical ideology and involvement with foreign jihadist networks.

== Casualties ==
- Russian Security Forces: Official figures for casualties among Russian security forces were not publicly available. However, reports indicated that thousands of soldiers and law enforcement personnel were killed or wounded in clashes with militants during the insurgency.
- Militants: Thousands of militants were killed, captured, or arrested by Russian security forces during the conflict. The exact number of casualties among the insurgents varied, with some estimates suggesting several hundred killed and thousands captured or neutralized.
- Civilian Losses: During the insurgency in Kabardino-Balkaria and Karachay-Cherkessia, the civilian population endured severe hardships at the hands of both militant groups and Russian security forces. Numerous reports highlighted human rights violations by security forces, including the killing of civilians who were often wrongly accused of being terrorists. Muslims in these regions faced systematic harassment, discrimination, and persecution for their religious practices, such as growing beards or attending mosques. By 2010, the atmosphere of fear was so pervasive that many residents avoided mosques altogether, fearing police harassment or even abduction, with several documented cases of individuals being kidnapped directly from places of worship. At the same time, militant groups carried out frequent terrorist attacks and acts of violence, adding to the suffering of civilians. In the late 1990s, members of various jamaats planned an armed uprising to seize control of Kabardino-Balkaria and Karachay-Cherkessia with the goal of creating a Muslim state. However, the onset of the Second Chechen War in 1999 forced them to shift their focus toward conducting terrorist operations throughout the region. The combination of these attacks and the oppressive actions of security forces fostered a climate of fear and instability, deeply impacting the lives of the local population. Some of the notable attacks include:

=== House explosions in Moscow and Volgodonsk ===
In September 1999, Gochiyaev and his accomplices Adam Dekkushev, Yusuf Krymshamkhalov, Denis Saytakov and others organized a series of explosions of residential buildings in Moscow and Volgodonsk. This series of terrorist attacks was organized and financed by the leaders of the illegal armed group " Islamic Institute "Caucasus"" – Khattab and Abu Umar. The terrorist attacks were aimed at massive loss of life and disruption of public safety, intimidation of the population and influencing the decision-making of authorities to eliminate the consequences of the militant invasion of Dagestan in August 1999.

=== A series of terrorist attacks in the Stavropol region ===
- October 6, 2000 – at 16:03–16:05 in Pyatigorskand Nevinnomyssk (Stavropol Territory) four explosions simultaneously occurred. The first explosion occurred at a bus stop near the administration of Nevinnomyssk, the second – at the Cossack market of Nevinnomyssk, the third and fourth – on the platform of the railway station in Pyatigorsk. As a result of the terrorist attacks, 4 people were killed and 20 were injured.
- December 8, 2000 – in the city of Pyatigorsk (Stavropol Territory) in the Upper Market area, two cars were simultaneously blown up. As a result of the terrorist attacks, 4 people were killed and 45 were injured.
- March 24, 2001 – explosion at the entrance to the Central Market of the city of Mineralnye Vody (Stavropol Territory). An explosive device with a capacity of at least 50 kg of TNT was placed in a VAZ-2103 passenger car. As a result of the terrorist attack, 21 people were killed and about 100 were injured. On the same day, a bomb exploded in a VAZ-2106 car near the local traffic police building in the city of Essentuki (Stavropol Territory). As a result of this terrorist attack, 22 people were injured. On the same day, during an inspection of a VAZ-2106 car en route to Nevinnomyssk, a bomb with a capacity of 40 kg of TNT was discovered. The car was driven into the forest near the village of Adyge-Khabl (Karachay-Cherkessia). During an attempt to clear the mines, the bomb exploded, killing 2 explosives experts from the Ministry of Internal Affairs. Terrorist Arasul Khubiev, the driver of the car, was not injured.

On July 12, 2002, the Stavropol Regional Court found Arasul Khubiev guilty of committing terrorist attacks and sentenced him to life imprisonment.

Through Rasul Khubiev, law enforcement agencies got on the trail of the Wahhabis. Soon about 20 members of Muslim Society No. 3 were detained. Some were caught in June 2001 by police from Kabardino-Balkaria, when militants tried to cross the Russian- Georgian border to get into the Pankisi Gorge to the location of the bandit group of field commander Ruslan Gelayev. Some of them were detained by Georgian border guards around the same time. Among the accused were ordinary performers – Otari Aibazov, Rashid Aibazov, Magomed Aushev, Oysul Kecherukov, Timur Otegenov, Dakhir Salpagarov, Enver Tekeev, Timur Shamanov, Aslan Khazbulatov, Osman Chaushev, Anzor Khutov, Valery Aibazov, Oli Kappushev, Azamat Tlisov and Ruzali Khutov. Their leaders were Kazbek Shailiev, Khyzyr Salpagarov, Ramazan Gochiyaev and Eduard Kharatokov.

16 ordinary Jamaat militants were convicted in August 2002; they all received from 4 to 16 years in prison. In relation to the three Wahhabi leaders, the criminal case was separated into separate proceedings. On September 26, 2002, the visiting session of the Stavropol Regional Court in Pyatigorsk issued a verdict against Khyzyr Salpagarov, Ramazan Gochiyaev and Eduard Kharatokov, who were the leaders of the jamaat. All three were found guilty by the jury several weeks before the verdict, but now the court sentenced them: Ramazan Gochiyaev received 23 years, Salpagarov – 19 years, Kharatokov – 15.

=== Explosion on a Moscow metro train ===
On Friday, February 6, 2004, an explosion occurred in a Moscow metro train traveling to the center between the Avtozavodskaya and Paveletskaya stations. An explosive device with a capacity of 2.9 to 6.6 kg in TNT equivalent was detonated by a 20-year-old resident of the village of Uchkeken in Karachay-Cherkessia, Anzor Izhaev; the bomb was in his backpack. As a result of the terrorist attack, 41 people (not counting Izhaev) were killed (this is the number of names listed on the memorial plaque installed at the Avtozavodskaya metro station), and about 250 people were injured. According to the investigation, the bomb for the terrorist attack was made by terrorists Idris Gloov, Tambiy Khubiev and Murat Shavaev in a rented apartment in the south of the capital.

=== Terrorist attack near the Rizhskaya metro station ===
At about 8 pm on August 31, 2004, a suicide bomber tried to enter the Rizhskaya metro station in Moscow, but after she saw the police officers on duty at the entrance, she turned around, walked a few meters and detonated an explosive device in a crowd of people. As a result of the terrorist attack, 10 people were killed, including the terrorist herself, as well as Nikolai Kipkeev, who took part in the preparation and implementation of the terrorist attack. A total of 33 people were injured. The power of the explosion was approximately 1.5–2 kg of TNT equivalent. The man who accompanied the suicide bomber to the Rizhskaya metro station and himself died along with her was Nikolai Kipkeev. Kipkeev was a member of the Karachay jamaat, was part of the personal security of Achemez Gochiyaev, and took part in a series of terrorist attacks in 2001. He also took part in the fighting in Chechnya as part of the "Karachay battalion", received several wounds, and then hid abroad.

=== Trial of the organizers of the terrorist attacks ===
The organizers of the terrorist attacks, Tambiy Khubiev, Murat Shavaev and Maxim Panaryin, who made explosive devices in rented apartments in Moscow, were arrested in May 2005. On February 2, 2007, for preparing two terrorist attacks in Moscow in 2004 and bombing bus stops in Voronezh and Krasnodar, they were sentenced by the Moscow City Court to life imprisonment.

Overall casualties from 2009 to 2017

Year	Killed	Wounded
2009	40	22
2010	81	84
2011	151	56
2012	112	51
2013	97	33
2014	49	17
2015	51	1
2016	14	1
2017	6	0
Total	601	265

The majority of the civilians killed in terrorist attacks were Russians and locals of Kabardino-Balkaria and Karachy-Cherkessia.

Note: The casualty totals are compiled by the news site Caucasian Knot, which does not vouch for the data's 100-percent accuracy.

== Violent Events ==
- 1999 Russian apartment bombings
- Battle of Galashki (2002)
- February 2004 Moscow bombing
- Battle of Chegem (2004)
- August 2004 Moscow Metro bombing
- 2004 raid on Nalchik
- 2005 raid on Nalchik
- Raid on Baksan hydroelectric power station
- 2011 Kabardino-Balkaria police patrol ambush

== Conclusion ==
The insurgency in Kabardino-Balkaria and Karachay-Cherkessia officially ended in 2017, following a series of successful counterinsurgency operations by Russian security forces. However, sporadic incidents of violence and unrest continue to occur in the region, highlighting the ongoing challenges of maintaining stability in the North Caucasus.

== See also ==
- Insurgency in the North Caucasus
- Second Chechen War
- Terrorism in Russia
