= Battle of Chegem (2004) =

- Part of the Insurgency in Kabardino-Balkaria and Karachay-Cherkessia
| Date | 18 August 2004 |
| Location | Near Chegem, Kabardino-Balkaria, Russia |
| Result | Yarmuk victory |

Belligerents
| Russia: Kabardino-Balkaria | Yarmuk Jamaat |

Commanders and leaders
| Unknown | Rustam Bekanov |

Strength
| 400 security forces 5-10 armored vehicles 2 helicopters | 8 militants |

Casualties and losses
| 2 killed 4 wounded | 2 killed |

The Battle of Chegem was an armed confrontation between Russian security forces and militants from the Yarmuk Jamaat, an Islamist insurgent group operating in the North Caucasus. The battle took place in August 2004 near the town of Chegem, in the Kabardino-Balkaria Republic. It was one of the most significant engagements in the early years of the insurgency in the region, highlighting the growing influence of militant groups outside of Chechnya.

== Background ==
In the early 2000s, the North Caucasus was experiencing a growing Islamist insurgency, with militant groups expanding their operations beyond Chechnya. One such group was Yarmuk Jamaat, a militant organization based in Kabardino-Balkaria. Yarmuk was believed to have ties to Chechen warlord Shamil Basaev, who was responsible for numerous high-profile attacks in Russia.

By 2004, Yarmuk had begun conducting attacks against Russian security forces and government targets in Kabardino-Balkaria. The group claimed responsibility for an attack on a branch of the Federal Drug Control Service (FSKN) in Nalchik, the capital of Kabardino-Balkaria, which killed four law enforcement officers.

== The Battle ==
On August 18, 2004, Russian security forces launched an operation to eliminate a group of eight Yarmuk militants hiding in the forests near Chegem. The operation involved as many as 400 members of the security forces, including special forces (spetsnaz), armored vehicles, and two helicopters.

Despite being vastly outnumbered and outgunned, the Yarmuk fighters engaged Russian forces in an intense battle that lasted for more than eight hours. The militants were armed with automatic weapons and grenade launchers, and they managed to inflict casualties on government troops before escaping into the surrounding wilderness.

The Russian forces were unable to eliminate the group, and six out of the eight militants managed to escape despite the overwhelming firepower used against them. The battle was widely seen as a humiliating failure for Russian security forces, demonstrating the insurgents’ ability to operate effectively even when facing a numerically and technologically superior force.

== Aftermath ==
Following the battle, Russian authorities launched a crackdown on suspected militants in Kabardino-Balkaria. Yarmuk continued its operations, including attacks on government officials and security forces.

One of the militants involved in the Chegem battle, Rustam Bekanov, later became the leader of Yarmuk after the death of its previous commander, Muslim Ataev, in January 2005. Bekanov was later killed in a gun battle with police in Nalchik on April 29, 2005.

The failure to eliminate Yarmuk in Chegem contributed to the group's continued activity, culminating in the 2005 Nalchik attack, when insurgents launched a coordinated assault on government buildings in the capital of Kabardino-Balkaria.

== Significance ==
The Battle of Chegem was a turning point in the insurgency in Kabardino-Balkaria. It highlighted the growing military capabilities of local Islamist groups and their connections to Chechen separatists. The engagement also exposed weaknesses in Russian counterinsurgency operations, as even overwhelming force failed to neutralize a small band of militants.

The battle became an important event in the broader North Caucasus insurgency, illustrating how Islamist militant networks were expanding beyond Chechnya and into other republics of the region.

== See also ==
- Insurgency in the North Caucasus
- Second Chechen war
- Vilayat KBK
- 2004 Nalchik raid
- 2005 Nalchik raid
- Insurgency in Kabardino-Balkaria
