= Emir Sayfullah =

Emir Sayfullah may refer to:

- Emir Sayfullah, nom de guerre of Muslim Atayev (1973-2005), Balkar Islamist leader against the Russians in the North Caucasus
- Emir Sayfullah, nom de guerre of Anzor Astemirov (1976–2010), Circassian Islamist leader against the Russians in the North Caucasus
- Emir Sayfullah, nom de guerre of Magomed Vagabov (1975-2010), Dargwa Islamist leader against the Russians in the North Caucasus

== See also ==
- Saifullah (disambiguation)
