= Insurgency in Ingushetia =

2007–2015 armed conflict in Ingushetia, Russia

- Part of the Second Chechen War and North Caucasus Insurgency
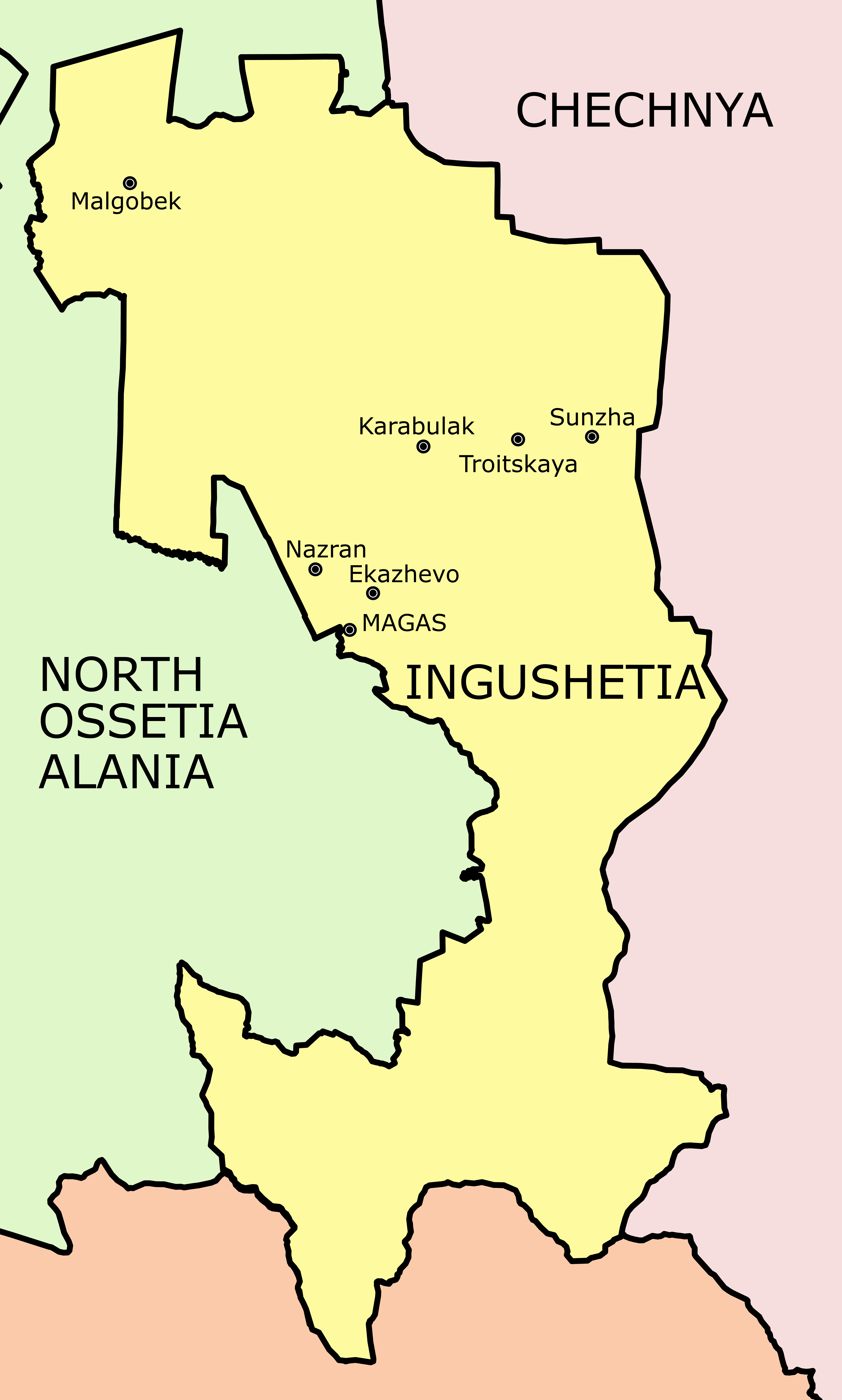
Date	21 July 2007 – 19 May 2015 (7 years, 9 months and 4 weeks)
Location	Ingushetia, Russia
Result	Russian victory; Destruction of Caucasus Emirate and other militant groups; Stabilization of the situation in Ingushetia

Belligerents
Russia; Ingushetia	Chechen Republic of Ichkeria (until October 2007); Caucasian Front (until October 2007); Caucasus Emirate (from October 2007); Vilayat Galgayche (from October 2007); (Ingushetia) Ingush opposition (2007–2008); ad hoc revenge groups

Commanders and leaders
(Russia) Vladimir Putin (Russia) Dmitry Medvedev (Ingushetia) Murat Zyazikov (Ingushetia) Yunus-bek Yevkurov	Dokka Umarov # Ilyas Gorchkhanov; Ali Taziev (POW); Said Buryatsky †; Arthur Getagazhev †

Casualties and losses
400 policemen killed (2005–2010); 93 security forces killed (2010–2014)	182 killed (2010–2014)
- 800 killed overall between 2002 and November 2008; 71 civilians killed (2010–2014)

The Insurgency in Ingushetia (Russian: Война в Ингушетии, romanized: Voyna v Ingushetii) began in 2007 as a spillover of then ongoing separatist conflict in Chechnya into neighbouring Ingushetia. The conflict has been described as a civil war by local human rights activists and opposition politicians; others have referred to it as an uprising. By mid-2009 Ingushetia had surpassed Chechnya as the most violent of the North Caucasus republics. However, by 2015 the insurgency in the Republic had greatly weakened, and the casualty toll declined substantially in the intervening years.

== History ==
On 26 July 2007, a massive security operation was launched in Ingushetia, sparked by a series of attacks including an assassination attempt on President Murat Zyazikov five days earlier. Moscow sent in an additional 2,500 MVD troops, almost tripling the number of special forces in Ingushetia. In the next few days, hundreds of men were rounded up in the sweeps, while several security officers were killed and wounded in the continued attacks. By October 2007, police and security forces in Ingushetia were issued orders to stop informing the media of any "incidents of a terrorist nature."

In 2008, Magomed Yevloyev, owner of the highly critical opposition website Ingushetia.ru, was killed while in police custody. The aftermath of the killing was marked by an upsurge in separatist activity and animosity towards Russia and Russians among the Ingush population. At the center of this controversy was the deeply unpopular President Murat Zyazikov, a former KGB general who was criticized both by human rights groups and by some in the Russian government. The Ingush Interior Minister Musa Medov was targeted by a suicide bomber in October 2008. Eventually, Zyazikov was asked to resign. On 30 October 2008, Russian president Dmitry Medvedev signed a decree to remove Zyazikov from office and replace him with Lieutenant Colonel Yunus-bek Yevkurov. This was hailed by the Ingush opposition as a victory.

However, the violence did not end. According to police sources, nearly 50 people (including 27 rebels, 18 policemen and two civilians) died in the almost daily clashes in this small republic (less than 500,000 inhabitants) in the first three months of 2009. Assassinations and attempted assassinations of high-profile figures continued. On 10 June 2009 Aza Gazgireeva, the Deputy Chief Justice of the Supreme Court of Ingushetia, was gunned down, and on 13 June former Deputy Prime Minister Bashir Aushev was shot dead outside his home. Ingush President Yevkurov was seriously wounded in a suicide bomb attack on 22 June, and Construction Minister Ruslan Amerkhanov was shot dead in his office in August. In October 2010, the Ingush branch of the Islamist Caucasus Emirate group announced a moratorium on killing police officers; according to President Yevkurov, 400 police officers had been killed in Ingushetia in the five years to 2 October 2010.

After 2010, the levels of violence in Ingushetia began to decline, this trend continued, with total casualties in the Republic falling by over 60 percent from 2013 to 2014. In 2014, the insurgency's leader Arthur Getagazhev was killed by security forces. In mid-2015, Yevkurov stated that the insurgency in the Republic had been 'defeated'. He said that 80 fighters from the group had turned themselves in and been given amnesty and that the remaining active insurgents were greatly reduced in numbers. Reasons suggested for this decline, which was reflected more broadly throughout the Insurgency in the North Caucasus, included the deaths of high-ranking insurgency commanders, the increased targeting by security forces of the support infrastructure relied on by the insurgents, and an exodus of insurgents to other conflict zones.

There was fighting in March 2024 in Karabulak between Russian security forces and alleged militants. Six alleged militants were killed.

== See also ==
- 2004 Nazran raid
- 2009 Nazran bombing
- East Prigorodny Conflict
- Insurgency in the North Caucasus
