= Moscow metro bombing =

Moscow metro bombing may refer to:

- 1977 Moscow bombings
- February 2004 Moscow Metro bombing
- August 2004 Moscow Metro bombing
- 2010 Moscow Metro bombings
