= Alim Zankishiev =

Balkar militant (1982–2012)

- Nickname: Emir Ubaidallah
- Born: 8 March 1982; Kabardino-Balkar ASSR, RSFSR, USSR
- Died: 27 March 2012 (aged 30) Nalchik, Kabardino-Balkaria
- Allegiance: United Vilayat of Kabarda-Balkaria-Karachay; Caucasus Emirate
- Conflicts: Insurgency in the North Caucasus; Insurgency in Kabardino-Balkaria and Karachay-Cherkessia; 2005 raid on Nalchik

Alim Zankishiev, also known as Emir Ubaidallah, was the leader of the Kabardino-Balkaria-Karachai wing of the Caucasus Emirate organisation in the Russian Republic of Kabardino-Balkaria.

== Biography ==
An ethnic Balkar born in 1982, Zankishiev was placed on a Russian wanted list on 21 September 2006 for attacks on law enforcement and illegal acquisition and possession of weapons. He also was accused by the Russian authorities of involvement in the killing of nine gamekeepers and hunters in November 2007 and the killing of Interior Ministry official Anatoly Kyarov in January 2008, and may have played a role in the 2005 Nalchik raid.

Much of the Jamaat’s then leadership was decimated by Russian security forces in March 2011, including emir Asker Dzhappuyev. On 9 September 2011, Dokku Umarov, Emir of the Caucasus Emirate promoted Zankishiev from commander of the Central (Nalchik) sector to overall emir of the armed forces of Vilayet KBK.

Zankishiev was killed after security forces stormed a private house in Nalchik on 27 March 2012.
