= Ali Taziev =

Ingush warlord

Ali Taziev Али Мусаевич Тазиев
- Born: August 19, 1974 (age 52); Nasyr-Kort, Chechen–Ingush ASSR, Soviet Union
- Military career
- Allegiance: Caucasus Emirate
- Service years: until 2010
- Nickname: Magas
- Conflicts: Second Chechen War; Civil war in Ingushetia; North Caucasus Insurgency
- Criminal conviction
- Criminal information
- Organization: Ingush Jamaat
- Status: Imprisoned for life
- Conviction: Terrorism

Ali Musaevich Taziev (Russian: Али Мусаевич Тазиев, Ingush: Тазинаькъан Мусай Ӏаьла, romanized: Tazinäqhan Musæj Hälæ), also known as Akhmed Yevloev (Russian: Ахмед Евлоев; Ingush: Йовлой Ахьмад, romanized: Jovloj Æx́mad), Magomet Yevloyev, and Emir Magas; born 19 August 1974) is the former leader of both the Ingushetia-based Ingush Jamaat and as the military wing of the Caucasus Emirate. On 30 September 2006, Taziev was appointed to the post of commander of the Caucasian Front by the orders of Dokka Umarov. In July 2007, one year after Shamil Basayev's death, Taziev became his official successor as the most high-ranking military commander in the rebel forces. He is believed to be personally responsible for the death of several local high-ranking security officials.

== Biography ==
Taziev is an ethnic Ingush who was raised in Grozny, Chechnya. He participated in the First Chechen War. After the conclusion of the First Chechen War, he returned to Ingushetia and entered the police. There he was promoted to the Ingush Interior Ministry Police forces, where he attained the rank of captain. At the start of the Second Chechen War, he returned to Chechnya and became a sub-commander under Shamil Basayev before Basayev assigned him to use his family and clan ties to begin raising armed groups in Ingushetia. In this position, he was among the commanders of the 2004 Nazran raid in which simultaneous nationwide raids on police stations killed over 70 security personnel in the capital Nazran; according to the Russian Federal Security Service (FSB), during the attack Taziev personally killed the acting Ingush Interior Minister Abubakar Kostoyev.

Taziev was listed by Russia as one of the dead terrorists of the 2004 Beslan hostage crisis, the person who led the negotiations on behalf of the hostage takers under the name Ali Taziyev and whose body was identified after he was killed during the storming of the school. Those reports were proved incorrect two years later, when Taziev was declared wanted by Russia for the assassination of the Ingush deputy Interior Minister Dzhabrail Kostoyev in May 2006. Although the negotiator of the siege known as Ali had similar features as Taziev, his facial profile was much different. According to FSB information, Ali Taziyev was an Ingush Interior Ministry policeman who disappeared without a trace in 1998 and was declared legally dead in 2000, but instead might have joined forces of the Chechen Republic of Ichkeria (ChRI).

After the death of Ilyas Gorchkhanov during the 2005 Nalchik raid, Taziev was the next in line to assume leadership of the Ingush Jamaat. In 2006, he was incorrectly reported as being killed by the FSB operation that allegedly killed Shamil Basayev. A month after Basayev's death Taziev was appointed military leader of the Caucasian Front by the President of Ichkeria Dokka Umarov; at the same time Yevloyev still held leadership of the Ingush Jamaat. On July 19, 2007, Taziev was named the Military Amir of the ChRI Armed Forces by Umarov; his deputies were announced to be first deputy Muhannad, second deputy Tarkhan Gaziev and third deputy Aslambek Vadalov. On October 31, 2007, Umarov proclaimed the Caucasus Emirate and it is assumed he is now the Military Amir of the Caucasus Emirate, of which the Caucasian Front is still its military branch.

Ingush authorities say Ali Taziev has been more effective in recruiting new rebels than any other previous commander in Ingushetia. Russian sources have also repeatedly blamed him for some of the most deadly attacks on security forces in Ingushetia and neighbouring regions, including the raids of Nazran and Nalchik, in which he worked closely with Shamil Basayev, Dokka Umarov, Ilyas Gorchkhanov and Anzor Astemirov. In addition, he has been assigned responsibility for the June 2009 bombing attack against Ingush President Yunus-Bek Yevkourov which badly wounded the president. It is widely believed that Ali Taziev's tactical successes on the battlefield are fruits of his time spent as an Ingush Interior Ministry Policeman, from 1996 to 1998 before he disappeared with his partner, and the wife of a local politician they were tasked with protecting. The woman was released in Grozny, Chechnya in February 2000 unharmed, Taziev's partner turned up dead and Taziev joined the North Caucasus Insurgency.

== Capture and trial ==
On 9 June 2010, the Russian authorities announced that Taziev had been captured after voluntarily giving himself up to Ingush police. 3 years after the announcement of his capture, Taziev's trial began on 13 May 2013 in front of a Russian court in Rostov-na-Donu. On 21 June 2013, the head of Ingushetia, Yunus-bek Yevkurov, appeared at the trial as a victim and a witness. Russian media showed footage of Taziev and Yevkurov debating with each other, with Taziev refusing to ask for forgiveness for anything he is accused of, saying instead that he would only ask for pardon from God. In October 2013, he was sentenced to life imprisonment on terrorism charges.
