= Asker Dzhappuyev =

Soviet jihadist leader (1971–2011)

- Nickname: Emir Abdullah
- Born: 14 January 1971; Kabardino-Balkaria, RSFSR, USSR
- Died: 29 April 2011 (aged 40) Progress, Stavropol Krai
- Allegiance: United Vilayat of Kabarda-Balkaria-Karachay; Caucasus Emirate
- Conflicts: Insurgency in the North Caucasus; Insurgency in Kabardino-Balkaria and Karachay-Cherkessia; Raid on Baksan hydroelectric power station

Asker Tembotovich Dzhappuyev (Russian: Аскер Темботович Джаппуев), also known as Emir Abdullah, (14 January 1971 – 29 April 2011) was the leader of the Jihadist United Vilayat of Kabarda-Balkaria-Karachay organisation in the Russian Republic of Kabardino-Balkaria.

An ethnic Balkar, Dzhappuyev became the emir of Vilayat of Kabarda-Balkaria-Karachay on 16 May 2010 following the killing of his predecessor, Anzor Astemirov, by the Russian security services. Under Dzhappuyev's command, there was a substantial increase in the number of attacks carried out by the United Vilayat of Kabarda-Balkaria-Karachay. While he encouraged his fighters to avoid civilian casualties, other young commanders like Ratmir Shameyev were more radical.

Among the attacks carried out in Kabardino-Balkaria during his tenure was a raid on the Baksan hydroelectric power station and the assassinations of the Kabardino-Balkaria mufti Anas Pshikhachev and the prominent ethnographer Aslan Tsipinov.

On 29 April 2011, Dzhappuyev was amongst 10 militants, including Emir Abdul Jabbar of the North Eastern Sector and Emir Zakaria of the South Western Sector, killed by security forces in the village of Progress in Stavropol Krai. Caucasus Emirate leader Dokka Umarov appointed Alim Zankishiev as his successor.
