= Digorsky =

Digorsky (masculine), Digorskaya (feminine), or Digorskoye (neuter) may refer to:

- Digorsky District, a district of the Republic of North Ossetia–Alania, Russia
- Digorskoye Urban Settlement, a municipal formation which Digora Town Under District Jurisdiction in Digorsky District of the Republic of North Ossetia–Alania, Russia is incorporated as
- Alan Digorsky, presumably the real name of Emir Saad, Ossetian Islamist militant
