= Kataib al-Khoul =

Vilayat Iriston Russian: Вилайят Иристон Ossetian: Уылайад Ирыстон / Уилайадæ Иристон
- Leader: Alan Digorsky (Emir Saad)
- Dates active: 16 May 2005 – 9 March 2006 (As Ossetian Sector of the Caucasian Front); 9 March 2006 – 7 October 2007 (As Kataib al-Khoul); 7 October 2007 – 12 May 2009 (As Vilayat Iriston)
- Part of: Caucasian Front (2005–2007); Caucasus Emirate (2007–2009)
- Wars: Second Chechen War, Insurgency in the North Caucasus

Kataib al-Khoul (Russian and Ossetian: Катаиб аль-Хоул, romanized: Kataib al'-Khoul), also known as the Ossetian Jamaat (Russian: Осетинский джамаат, romanized: Ossetinskiy dzhamaat; Iron Ossetic: Ирон дзамат, romanized: Iron dzamat) and Vilayat Iriston (Russian: Вилайят Иристон, romanized: Vilayyat Iriston; Iron Ossetian: Уылайад Ирыстон, Wylajad Iryston; Digor Ossetian: Уилайадæ Иристон, Wilajadæ Iriston), was a militant Islamist organization connected to numerous attacks against the local and federal security forces in the Russian region of North Ossetia–Alania in the North Caucasus. It was part of the Caucasian Front of the Second Chechen War. Its existence inside a republic which is largely Russian Orthodox had led to denial by officials who refused to recognise that an Islamic insurgency group existed in Ossetia, and instead blamed the attacks on the Ingush Jamaat.

The Ossetian Jamaat, closely associated with the separatist conflict in nearby Chechnya, was established by Alan Digorsky, better known as Emir Saad. Its existence was first mentioned in May 2005 when Abdul-Halim Sadulayev created the Caucasian Front, Sadulayev referred to it as the Ossetian Sector of the Caucasian Front. Later after increased insurgency in parts of North-Ossetia, the group started to be referred to as Kataib al-Khoul. The group announced that it fought in favor of Chechnya's independence and was integrated into the Caucasian Front by the decree of the then President of Ichkeria, Sheikh Abdul Halim. Since the proclamation of the Caucasus Emirate in 2007, Kataib al-Khoul had similar goals to other Islamic nationalist insurgent groups in the region, as it sought to end Russian control of North Ossetia and establish an Ossetian Emirate of Iriston (Russian: Эмират Иристон, romanized: Emirat Iriston; Iron Ossetian: Эмират Ирыстон, Emirat Iryston; Digor Ossetian: Эмират Иристон, Emirat Iriston) with its capital at Vladikavkaz, which would be renamed as Jihadkau (Russian: Джихадкау, romanized: Dzhikhadkau; Iron Ossetian: Джихадхъæу, Dzhikhadqæw; Digor Ossetian: Джихадгъæу, Dzhikhadghæw) which in Ossetian literally translates to "City of Jihad". Despite being a group exclusively operating against Russian forces in North Ossetia–Alania, in March 2008 in a statement claiming responsibility for the killing of the head of the Organized Crime Control Department for North Ossetia, Mark Metsaev the group claimed that it was "conducting a detailed analysis of the situation and planning operations" in South Ossetia, however this came to be nothing.

Despite being a group that had claimed many attacks within North Ossetia targeting Russian forces, on 12 May 2009, Emir of the Caucasus Emirate Dokka Umarov issued a communique subsuming the rebel structures active in North Ossetia into the Emirate's Vilayat Galgayche subdivision. While Dokka Umarov did not give his reasons for this decision, some speculate that the reason was that since the assassination of the mayor of Vladikavkaz, Vitaly Karayev the activities of the Vilayat came to nothing for several months. This likely served as the ground for Dokka Umarov to disband the Vilayat.

== Attacks ==
On 3 October 2005, Kataib al-Khoul claimed responsibility for an attack near the village of Kardzhin, in which members of the Jamaat fired at two cars with Chechen loyalists heading for Nalchik, wounding several loyalists.
On 13 December 2005, Kataib al-Khoul claimed responsibility for an attack in the suburbs of Vladikavkaz, in which members of the Jamaat from grenade launchers fired at a substation that supplies power to several military facilities. As a result of the shelling, the substation was still able to operate, but it was damaged.
On 2 February 2006, Kataib al-Khoul claimed responsibility for the February 2006 bombings in casinos and gambling clubs in the center of Vladikavkaz, the capital of North Ossetia, leading to the death of 2 people and the injuring of 24 more, and which resulted in the closure of all the gambling clubs and casinos in the republic.
On 17 February 2006, Kataib al-Khoul claimed responsibility for an attack in the area of the village of Sunzha, in which members of the Jamaat ambushed a group of North Ossetian OMON forces using automatic weapons and grenade launchers, according to the Jamaat, several OMON forces were killed and wounded.
On 6 March 2006, Kataib al-Khoul claimed responsibility for an attack in the city of Mozdok, in which members of the Jamaat shot at a car with Russian loyalists from automatic weapons, according to the Jamaat, two of them were killed on the spot, and one was seriously wounded.
On 9 March 2006, 11 infantry fighting vehicles belonging to a military unit burned down in the village of Sputnik near Vladikavkaz on the territory of a motorized rifle regiment. According to the official version, the cause was a short circuit. The militants reported that it was as a result of an attack in which members of the Jamaat, allegedly dressed in Russian military uniforms, planted explosive devices in a box with equipment.
On 9 April 2006, Kataib al-Khoul claimed responsibility for an operation against drug dealers in Prigorodny District, in which members of the Jamaat captured five drug dealers who were later released.
On 13 April 2006, Kataib al-Khoul claimed responsibility for an attack in Vladikavkaz, in which members of the Jamaat shot dead a worker from the Ossetian Ministry of Internal Affairs and wounded a cash-collector driver.
On 20 April 2006, in Vladikavkaz, a submachine gunner shot dead Bimbolat Dzutsev, chieftain of the Alanian Terek Cossack army who in 1992, during the Ossetian-Ingush conflict commanded an Ossetian militia against the Ingush.
On 19 July 2006, Kataib al-Khoul claimed responsibility for an attack in the area of the village of Maiskoe, in which members of the Jamaat shot dead a worker from the Ingush Ministry of Internal Affairs and wounded another.
On 22 July 2006, Kataib al-Khoul claimed to have captured in Vladikavkaz a member of the special forces of the Chechen Ministry of Internal Affairs who was executed a few days later.
On 24 July 2006, Kataib al-Khoul claimed responsibility for an attack in the village of Kartsa, in which during a battle between members of the Jamaat and North Ossetian FSB and RUBOP forces, one member of the security forces was killed and two others were wounded.
On 27 July 2006, Kataib al-Khoul claimed responsibility for an attack in the village of Kartsa, in which one freelancer of the North Ossetian special forces was killed and another was wounded.
On 31 July 2006, Kataib al-Khoul claimed responsibility for an attack near the village of Maiskoe, in which members of the Jamaat fired at a car with workers from the Ingush Ministry of Internal Affairs wounding 3 workers.
On 6 September 2006, on the border of North Ossetia and Ingushetia, an armored personnel carrier, which was travelling as part of a convoy, was blown up. Four soldiers were killed, five were wounded. The Jamaat claimed responsibility for the explosion and said it was also planning aerial attacks.
On 11 September 2006, a Mi-8 helicopter with the highest ranks of the 58th Army crashed on the outskirts of Vladikavkaz, killing 15 Russian soldiers. The militants claimed that Emir Saad personally shot down the helicopter from MANPADS. Official authorities denied the militant version of the attack.
On 11 August 2007, Kataib al-Khoul claimed responsibility for an attack in the city of Mozdok, in which during a battle with members of the North Ossetian FSB two members of the FSB were killed and one other was wounded.
On 21 October 2007, Vilayat Iriston claimed responsibility for a sabotage operation using an explosive device in which a member of the North Ossetian OMON was killed.
On 12 December 2007, Vilayat Iriston claimed responsibility for the killing of two drug dealers in Moscow.
On 30 December 2007, Vilayat Iriston claimed responsibility for the killing of Elbrus Margiev in Vladikavkaz
On 7 March 2008, in the center of Vladikavkaz, the head of the Organized Crime Control Department for North Ossetia, Mark Metsaev, was killed by militants belonging to the group.
On 1 October 2008, Vilayat Iriston claimed responsibility for the killing of the leader of the Criminal Investigation Department of North Ossetia along with his son in Vladikavkaz
On 26 November 2008, The mayor of Vladikavkaz Vitaly Karayev, was killed by militants belonging to the group

In its just three years of existence, Kataib al-Khoul claimed responsibility for about 40 attacks in total.
