= Saifullah =

Saifullah (Arabic: سيف الله), meaning sword of God, is a male Islamic given name. Originally it was an honorific award for military prowess. In modern times it may be used as a surname.

== Saifullah ==
=== Males ===
Title

- SayfAllāh al-Maslūl, name given to Khalid ibn al-Walid (died 642), one of the companions of Muhammad
- Emir Saifullah, nom de guerre of Muslim Atayev (1974–2004), Islamist leader against the Russians in the North Caucasus
- Emir Sayfullah, nom de guerre of Anzor Astemirov (1976–2010), Islamist leader against the Russians in the North Caucasus
- Saifullah, name used by Daniel Patrick Boyd (born 1970), American alleged terrorist
- Saifullah, nom de guerre of Gazi Haider (1994–2020), leader of the Hizbul Mujahideen in Kashmir
- Saifullah Khalid (disambiguation), nom de guerre of various Islamist militants

Given name

- Sejfulla Malëshova (1901–1971), Albanian politician and writer
- Seifollah Vahid Dastjerdi (1926–1999), former head of Iranian Red Crescent Society
- Seifollah Kambakhshfard (1929–2010), Iranian archaeologist
- Saifullah Paracha (born 1947), Pakistani national held in Guantanamo
- Saif-ur-Rehman Mansoor (died ca. 2007), Taliban commander
- Saifullah Cheema, Pakistani politician
- Sayfullo Saipov (born 1988), Uzbek ISIS terrorist

Middle name

- Anwar Saifullah Khan (born 1945), Pakistani politician
- Salim Saifullah Khan, Pakistani politician
- Qari Saifullah Akhtar (died 2017), Pakistani alleged terrorist

Surname

- Zafar Saifullah (c. 1936–2014), Indian politician

=== Females ===
- Geysar Seyfulla qizi Kashiyeva, or Geysar Kashiyeva (1893–1972), Azerbaijani painter

== See also ==
- Qilla Saifullah, fort in Pakistan
- Qila Saifullah, town in Pakistan
- Killa Saifullah District, Pakistan
