= Emir Saad =

Islamic Insurgent leader

Alan Digorsky Алан Дигорский Дыгурты Алан / Дигорти Алан

1st Emir of Kataib al-Khoul
- In office March 2006 – 12 May 2009
- Preceded by: Position created
- Succeeded by: Position abolished
- Nickname: Emir Saad

Military service
- Allegiance: Kataib al-Khoul (2006–2009)
- Years of service: 2006–2009
- Rank: Emir of Kataib al-Khoul
- Battles/wars: Second Chechen War

Alan Digorsky (Russian: Алан Дигорский, romanized: Alan Digorskiy; Iron Ossetian: Дыгурты Алан, Dygurty Alan; Digor Ossetian: Дигорти Алан, Digorti Alan), better known as Emir Saad (Russian: Эмир Саад, romanized: Emir Saad, Iron Ossetian: Амыр Сад, Amyr Sad; Digor Ossetian: Амир Сад, Amir Sad), is an Islamist militant and the first leader of the Ossetian Jamaat Kataib al-Khoul which later became part of the Caucasus Front's North Ossetian Sector in Russia's republic of North Ossetia–Alania during the Second Chechen War.

Not much is publicly known about Digorsky. His name, if genuine, would indicate that he was an ethnic Ossetian. When Kataib al-Khoul's existence was mentioned for the first time he was notified as its leader. Since the creation of the Caucasus Emirate in 2007, his forces strived to end Russian control of North Ossetia and establish an Islamic state based on Sharia law. Although Ossetian Muslims are a minority group in the republic, Digorsky had been relatively active in his guerrilla campaign, claiming credit for the killings of several high-ranking officials and other attacks. Since the abolishment of Vilayat Iriston in May 2009, Digorsky's whereabouts remain unknown.

== Mil Mi-8 transport helicopter crash ==
On 11 September 2006, on the outskirts of Vladikavkaz, a Mil Mi-8 transport helicopter crashed, killing high ranks of 58th Combined Arms Army, including 3 Generals, 6 Colonels, 2 Lieutenant colonels and one Major. In total, 12 russian soldiers were killed.

Militants claim Emir Saad himself shot down the helicopter with a Man-portable air-defense system.
