= Ratmir Shameyev =

Ratmir Erikovich Shameyev Ратмир Эрикович Шамеев

Personal details
- Born: 7 July 1988
- Died: 29 April 2011 Progress, Stavropol Krai, Russia

Military service
- Allegiance: Caucasus Emirate
- Commands: Southwest Sector of United Vilayat of Kabarda, Balkaria and Karachay
- Battles/wars: North Caucasus Insurgency; Insurgency in Kabardino-Balkaria and Karachay-Cherkessia

Ratmir Erikovich Shameyev (Russian: Ратмир Эрикович Шамеев; July 7, 1988 – April 29, 2011), also known as Emir Zakariya, was a Kabardin Mujahid Emir (commander) fighting in the North Caucasus.

== Militant Activity ==
According to Russian law enforcement officials, Shameyev's militant career began in May 2010 when he was involved in a skirmish with local security forces. Traveling in a car with fellow militants, the vehicle exploded and Shameyev lost his right eye but was still able to escape his pursuers; this was seen as an act of God by other militants of the North Caucasus, and Shameyev's profile grew considerably. Following the incident Shameyev took to wearing the eye-patch which would become his trademark.

In the summer of 2010 Shameyev was identified as the Emir of the Chegem sector west of Nalchik, but he would then be promoted to Emir of the entire southwestern sector of the Caucasus Emirate's Vilayat of Kabarda, Balkaria and Karachay.

Known as a "brilliant and charismatic orator" who had been "lionized" on North Caucasian jihadist websites, Shameyev and Asker Dzhappuyev - the overall leader of the United Vilayat KBK - were the "putative masterminds" behind a 12-month killing spree that resulted in the deaths of dozens of police and local government officials in Kabardino-Balkaria, including republican mufti Anas Pshikhachev as well as respected Circassian ethnographer Aslan Tsipinov.

== Death ==
Shameyev was killed by Russian security forces in the village of Progress, Stavropol Krai on 29 April 2011. It has been speculated that the 7 April 2011 capture of two of the United Vilayat's support personnel in Progress may have led to the intelligence that revealed Shameyev's safehouse and resulted in his death just weeks later.

Two women and seven other militants also died in the gun battle, including Dzhappuyev (also known as Emir Abdullakh), Emir of the KBK Northeastern sector Kazbek Tashu (Abdul Jabbar), Aslanbek Khamurzov (Abdul Ghafoor), Deputy Emir Abdul Jabaar, Tamerlan Dyeshkov, Albek Kokarev, and Zalim Kunov. The operation resulted in the virtual decapitation of the insurgency leadership in Kabardino-Balkaria.
