= Arthur Getagazhev =

Islamist militant leader in Ingushetia

- Native name: Артур Гатагажев
- Nickname: Emir Abdullah (Ubaydullakh)
- Born: 9 November 1975; Mary, Turkmen SSR
- Died: 24 May 2014 (aged 38) Sagopshi, Ingushetia, Russia
- Allegiance: Caucasus Emirate
- Commands: Vilayat Galgayche
- Conflicts: Insurgency in Ingushetia; North Caucasus Insurgency

Arthur Getagazhev (Russian: Артур Гатагажев; 9 November 1975 – 24 May 2014), also known as Emir Abdullah or Ubaydullakh, was an Islamist militant leader in the Russian North Caucasus republic of Ingushetia.

Active in the Insurgency in Ingushetia from at least 2009 , Getagazhev was credited for many attacks in Ingushetia including the assassination of the Ingushetia head of security Akhmet Kotiev.

Following the killing of Dzhamaleyl Mutaliyev (alias Emir Adam) by Russian security forces on 21 May 2013, Doku Umarov, leader of the Caucasus Emirate, appointed Getagazhev as the head of the Vilayat Galgayche rebels. Getagazhev was among 7 killed during a raid by security forces on the village of Sagopshi on 24 May 2014.

== Aftermath ==
On 6 July 2014, Russian special forces prepared an ambush near the morgue where the body of Arthur Getagazhev was located. The intelligence reported that Ingush rebels would try to recover the body of the slain leader. Radio Free Europe (department specializing on the Caucasus) claimed that in the middle of the day two Ingush rebels attacked the ambush, killed seven and wounded four Russian FSB and spetsnaz officers within less than 40 seconds, after which the rebels left the scene unharmed.
