= Raid on Baksan hydroelectric power station =

Battle of the North Caucasus Insurgency

Raid on the Baksan hydroelectric power station
- Part of Insurgency in the North Caucasus and Insurgency in Kabardino-Balkaria
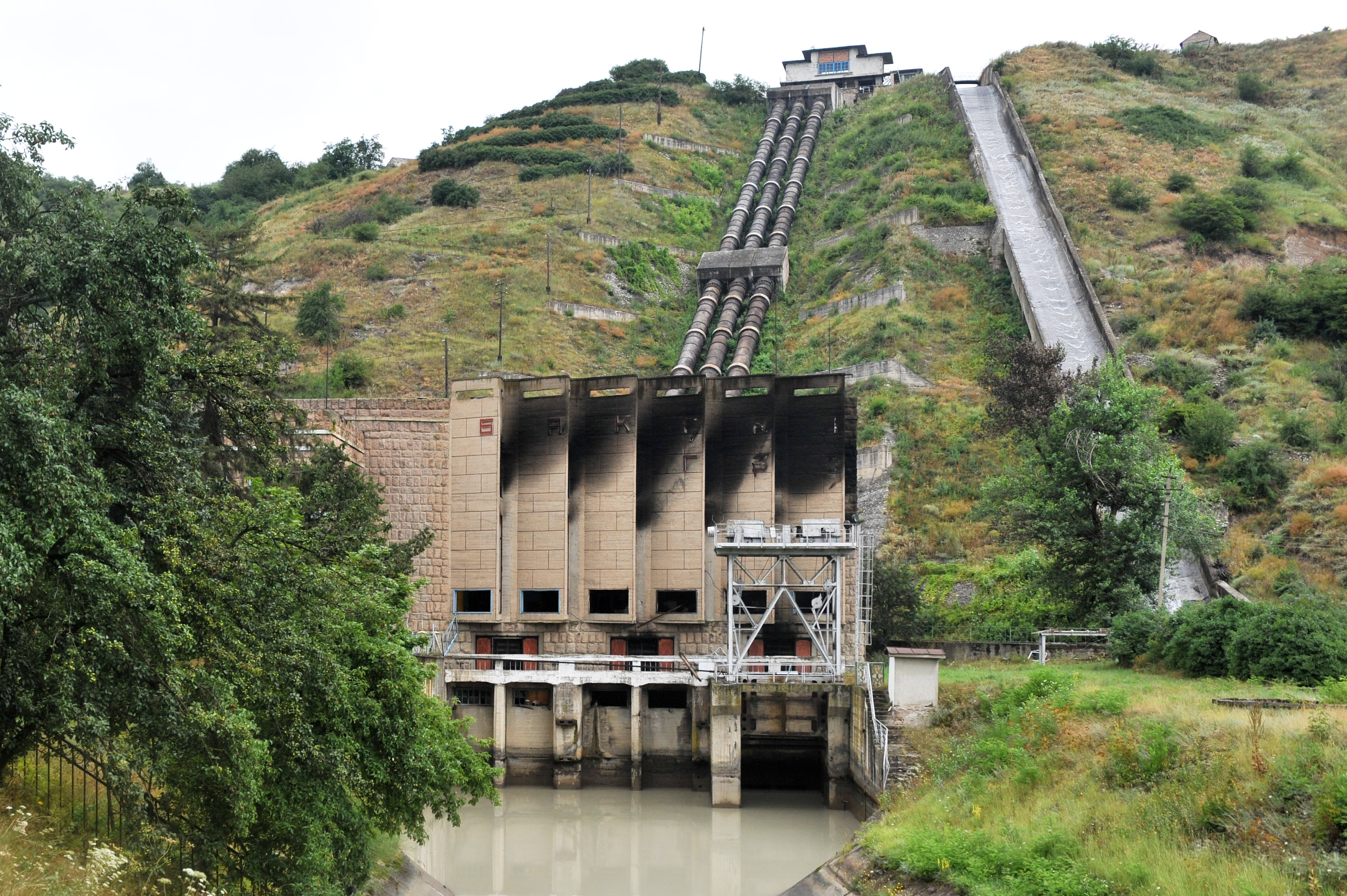
- Baksan hydroelectric power station after the raid
Date	21 July 2010
Location	Atazhukino, Baksansky District, Kabardino-Balkaria, Russia
Result	Vilayat KBK‘s victory: two power units were detonated

Belligerents
Caucasus Emirate: Vilayat KBK	Russia: Kabardino-Balkaria

Commanders and leaders
Asker Dzhappuyev	Unknown

Strength
4	5 Security guards

Casualties and losses
None	2 killed 3 wounded

The Raid on the Baksan hydroelectric power station was a militant attack that took place on July 21, 2010, in Kabardino-Balkaria, a republic in the North Caucasus region of Russia. The attack was carried out by four gunmen affiliated with the Caucasus Emirate, an Islamist militant organization active in the region.

== Background ==
The raid on the Baksan hydroelectric power station occurred in the context of ongoing insurgency and instability in the North Caucasus region of Russia. Since the early 2000s, militant groups, particularly those aligned with the Caucasus Emirate, have carried out numerous attacks aimed at destabilizing Russian control and establishing an Islamist state in the region. Under the leadership of Asker Dzhappuyev, the Vilayat Kabardino-Balkaria-Karachay (KBK) division of the Caucasus Emirate became increasingly active, targeting key infrastructure to undermine government authority.

== The Attack ==
On the morning of July 21, 2010, four militants associated with the Caucasus Emirate launched a coordinated assault on the Baksan hydroelectric power station in Kabardino-Balkaria. The attackers infiltrated the facility, killing two security guards and wounding 3 others who were stationed at the site. Once inside, they planted several explosive devices on the power station's machinery.

The explosions caused severe damage to two of the power units, leading to a temporary shutdown of the station's operations. The blast did not result in a complete power outage in the region, but it highlighted the vulnerability of critical infrastructure to militant attacks.

== Perpetrators ==
The Caucasus Emirate, a militant Islamist group operating across the North Caucasus, claimed responsibility for the attack. The group, under the leadership of Doku Umarov and his regional commanders like Asker Dzhappuyev, aimed to create an independent Islamic state governed by Sharia law in the region. This incident was part of a broader strategy by the Caucasus Emirate to target infrastructure, including energy facilities, transportation networks, and law enforcement installations.

== Aftermath ==
The Russian government responded to the attack with increased security measures at strategic infrastructure sites across the North Caucasus. Authorities initiated a counter-terrorism operation to locate and neutralize those responsible for the attack. The raid on the Baksan hydroelectric power station intensified concerns over the militants’ ability to disrupt critical energy supplies in the region.

Following the incident, Russian officials acknowledged the need to bolster security at key facilities to prevent similar attacks in the future. The event also led to a crackdown on suspected militant sympathizers and increased surveillance in Kabardino-Balkaria and surrounding areas.

== Reactions ==
The attack drew condemnation from Russian authorities and was widely reported in both domestic and international media. It was seen as a significant escalation in the tactics of the Caucasus Emirate, emphasizing their intent to target essential infrastructure as part of their insurgency campaign against the Russian state.

== See also ==
- Insurgency in the North Caucasus
- Caucasus Emirate
- Kabardino-Balkaria
