= 2007 Zhani-Vedeno ambush =

Battle of the Second Chechen War

- Part of the Second Chechen War
Date	7 October 2007
Location	Zhani-Vedeno, Chechnya
Result	Chechen victory

Belligerents
Russia: Chechen Republic	Chechen Republic of Ichkeria: Caucasian Front

Commanders and leaders
(Chechnya) Muslim Ilyasov †	(Chechen Republic of Ichkeria) Amir Aslambek (Chechen Republic of Ichkeria) Arbi Muntsigov (WIA)

Casualties and losses
4 KIA; 10–16 WIA Rebel claim: 25 KIA	1 KIA; Several WIA

The 2007 Zhani-Vedeno ambush occurred on 7 October when a convoy of vehicles carrying local Russian interior ministry soldiers and policemen was ambushed in the volatile Vedeno region of Chechnya. The ambush resulted in the deaths of at least four soldiers and the hospitalisation of 10 to 16. It was carried out under the command of Amir Aslambek, and was one of the deadliest attacks in several months.

According to an article by Kommersant, the convoy of a dozen armored military trucks and armored personnel carriers carrying detachments of local police officers and servicemen from the Akhmad Kadyrov Patrol Police Regiment-2 and the South (Yug) Battalion of Internal Troops (both composed of Kadyrovtsy) was reinforcing forces involved in the clearance operation in the village of Dargo, a bastion of the resistance to Russian rule for 300 years.

According to the separatist website Chechenpress, the ambush and subsequent fighting resulted in the deaths of 25 soldiers (10 to 16 from the ambush) and one rebel. The Russian sources also said a body of fighter was found in Dargo.
