= Vilayat Galgayche =

Islamist militant organization

Vilayat Galgayche Вилайят Галгайче
- Flag of the Caucasus Emirate
- Leaders: Ilias Gorchkhanov †; Akhmed Yevloyev (Emir Magas) (POW); Dzhamaleyl Mutaliyev (Emir Adam) †; Arthur Getagazhev (Emir Ubaydullakh) †; Beslan Makhauri (Emir Muhammad) †
- Dates active: 2005 – 7 October 2007 (under Caucasian Front); 7 October 2007 – 7 February 2017(under Caucasus Emirate)
- Active regions: Russian North Caucasus (Ingushetia and North Ossetia–Alania)
- Ideology: Islamism; Separatism
- Part of: Caucasian Front (2005–2007); Caucasus Emirate (2007-2015); Caucasus Province (since 2015)
- Wars: Second Chechen War Insurgency in the North Caucasus War in Ingushetia

Vilayat Galgayche, (Note: Ingush: Вилаят ГӀалгӀайче, romanized: Vilayat Ghalghayche; Russian: Вилайят Галгайче, romanized: Vilayat Galgayche) formerly known as Ingush Jamaat, (Note: Ingush: ГӀалгӀай ДжамаIат, romanized: Vilayat Ghalghaj Jamaat; Russian: Ингушский Джамаат, romanized: Ingushskiy Jamaat) was an Islamist militant organization connected to numerous attacks against the local and federal security forces in the Russian regions of Ingushetia and Chechnya in the North Caucasus. Since 2007 it has been a part of the Caucasus Emirate and takes part in the Insurgency in the North Caucasus. The group is thought to be responsible for the deaths of hundreds of people, mostly policemen, military personnel and officials.

== History ==
After the Second Chechen War broke out, many of the Ingush fighters did not participate in the war as it was viewed as a nationalist movement. Some of them still felt closely related to their destroyed home-city Grozny started rebuilding their military units in Ingushetia, still loyal to Aslan Maskhadov and Basayev. In 2000-2001 the jamaat was reformed along territorial lines in Ingushetia proper, with many units tied to a single city or area. Following the changes in the organisation, all Ingush units started working under the unified Jamaat Shariat (not to be confused with Dagestan's Shariat Jamaat). In 2004 the Jamaat was renamed to Shariat Special Operations Group in accordance with the wishes of Maskhadov; later this changed to Ingush sector of the South-Western Front and, when Abdul-Halim Sadulayev created the Caucasian Front in 2005, Sadulayev referred to it as the Ingush sector of the Caucasus Front. Throughout its many name changes it was mostly referred to simply as the Ingush Jamaat.

The group played a key role in the 2004 Nazran raid, an important event which helped to escalate the low-level Ingush insurgency since 2002 into the increasing unrest and eventually into a "civil war", in which more than 800 people died in this tiny republic of less than 500,000 by November 2008. It also took part in the 2005 Nalchik raid, organized by the local Kabardino-Balkar group Yarmuk Jamaat. Following the death of Ilyas Gorchkhanov in Nalchik, the leader of the Ingush Jamaat was Akhmed Yevloyev until his capture in June 2010. Later in 2010, the Vilayat adopted more nationalist rhetoric, vowing to "temporarily" stop killing Ingush policemen and instead attack targets in North Ossetia and help to reclaim the native Ingush lands of Prigorodny District. The group also reaffirmed its loyalty to Umarov following the rejection of his leadership by the Chechen rebels in 2010. The capture or killing of many Vilayat commanders from 2010 onwards coincided with a decline in the insurgency in Ingushetia, with the number of attacks falling substantially over the next 5 years.

In July 2015, a video was released showing the leader of the Ingush Vilayat, Beslan Makhauri, alongside his Chechen counterpart Aslan Byutukayev, pledging allegiance to the Islamic State of Iraq and the Levant (ISIL) leader Abu Bakr al-Baghdadi.

== See also ==
- Civil war in Ingushetia
