= Murat Gasaev =

Russian torture victim

Murat Gasaev (also transliterated as Murad Gasayev), was a Russian refugee in Spain. An ethnic Chechen from the Republic of Ingushetia, he was extradited to Russia in December 2008 despite protests by human rights organizations including Amnesty International and Human Rights Watch. It was feared that Gasaev might be at risk of torture and ill-treatment, as well as the denial of a fair trial due to the potential use of evidence extracted under torture in Russia.

The Russia's extradition request appeared to have been based on statements by a prisoner in Russian custody who accused Gasaev of being a participant in the events of June 2004 (the 2004 Nazran raid on government buildings in Ingushetia) while under interrogation by the Federal Security Service (FSB). That detainee, Idris Matiev, later retracted his statement, alleging that he had been subjected to beatings, torture with electric shocks and threats against his family. Gasaev has claimed that he was detained in Ingushetia in August 2004 by five masked officers, who took him to the central office of the FSB in Ingushetia, where he was tortured and questioned about the attack. He was not charged and was released after three days of torture.

Gasaev fled Russia and eventually sought refuge in Spain in 2005. However, his claim of asylum was rejected on the basis of "confidential information provided by the Spanish authorities." In December 2006, he was arrested as a suspected "militant" by the Spanish authorities in Valencia at the request of Russia. The Council of Europe's Committee for the Prevention of Torture is not known to have been consulted about the "diplomatic assurances" given by the Russian public prosecutor until after the Spanish court had approved the extradition request. According to experts, "with or without guarantees, a Chechen who is accused of killing police officers does not stay alive for long in a Russian prison."

On December 31, 2008, Gasaev was sent to Russia without any anti-torture guarantees in the first such extradition from a European country. Amnesty International said the extradition violated Spain's obligations under international human rights law, including the United Nations Convention Against Torture.

On June 30, 2009, the senior Russian investigator in charge of the case ruled that all charges should be dropped against Gasayev, whose alibi was corroborated by five witnesses. He was freed on August 28, after 10 months in detention in Russia. "It’s a great relief that Gasayev is out of detention, but he should never have been there in the first place," Tanya Lokshina, HRW's deputy Moscow director said.
