= Baksan Hydroelectric Power Station =

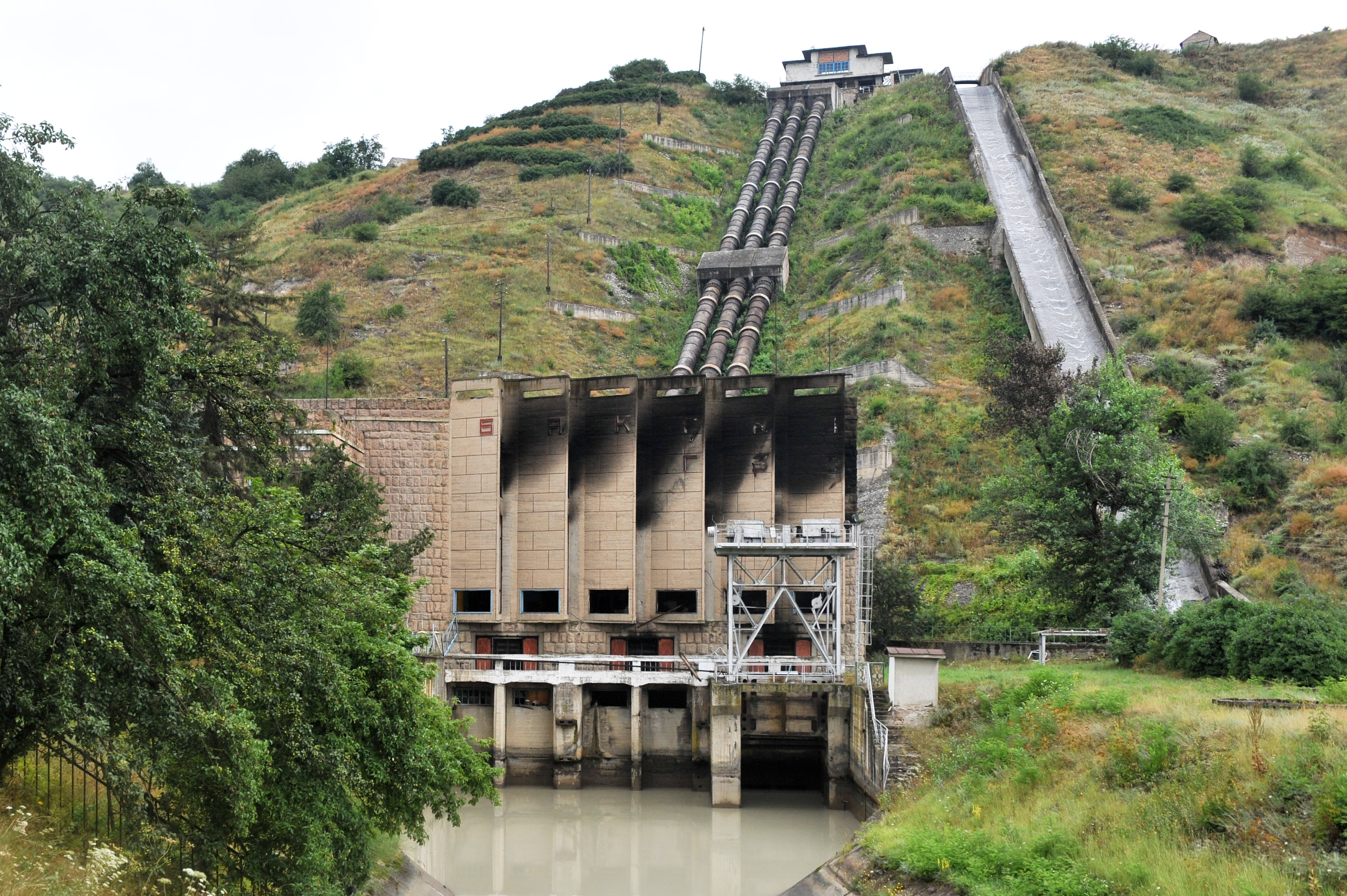

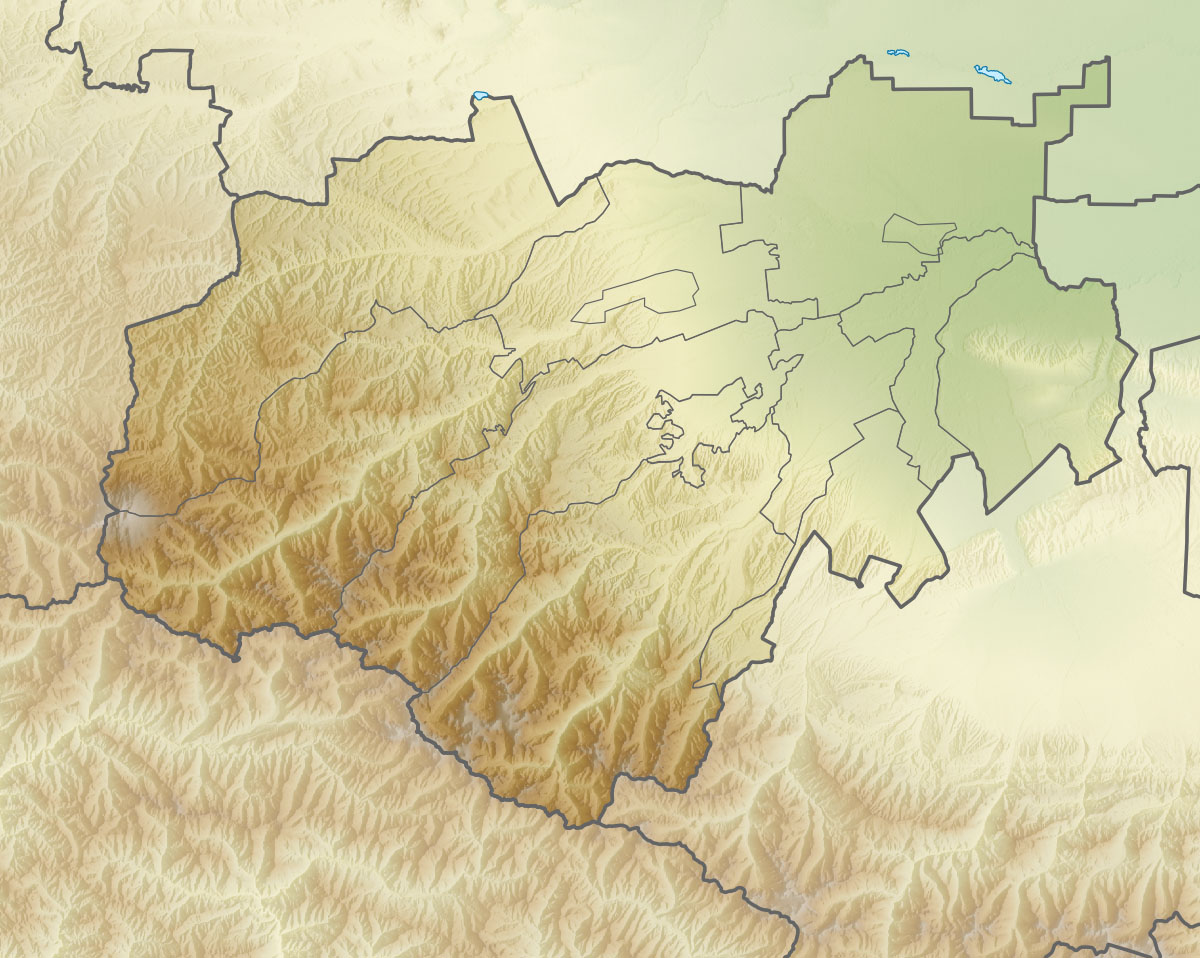
- Location within Kabardino-Balkaria Location within Russia
- Country: Kabardino-Balkaria, Russia
- Location: Atazhukino, Baksansky District
- Coordinates: 43°39′18.39″N 43°23′48.87″E
- Status: Operational
- Construction began: 1930
- Opening date: 1936
- Owner: RusHydro

Dam and spillways
- Impounds: Baksan River

Power Station
- Turbines: 3 x 9 MW
- Installed capacity: 27 MW

The Baksan Hydroelectric Power Station is a small hydroelectric power station on the Baksan River in Atazhukino, Baksansky District, Kabardino-Balkaria, Russia. It is one of the oldest hydroelectric plants in Russia. It is owned by RusHydro.

== History ==
The Baksan hydroelectric power station was built according to the GOELRO plan in 1930–1936. The first turbine became operational on 20 September 1936. The power station was completed in 1939. During World War II, the power station was badly damaged.

On 21 July 2010, the power station was attacked by four gunmen from the Caucasus Emirate militant group. Two security guards were killed and two power units were detonated.

== Description ==
The power station consists of three turbines with a capacity of 9 MW each.
