= United Vilayat of Kabarda, Balkaria and Karachay =

North Caucasian jihadist organization

United Vilayat of Kabarda-Balkaria-Karachay
- Flag of the Caucasus Emirate
- Leaders: Muslim Atayev (Emir Sayfullah) †; Rusam Bekanov †; Anzor Astemirov (Emir Sayfullah) †; Asker Dzhappuyev (Emir Abdullah) †; Alim Zankishiev (Emir Ubaidallah) †; Timur Tatchaev (Emir Khamza) †; Ruslan Baryrbekov (Emir Khamza) †; Khasanbi Fakov (Emir Abu Khasan) †; Tengiz Guketlov (Emir Tengiz) †; Astemir Berkhamov (Emir Al Bara) †; Robert Zankishiev (Emir Abdullah) †; Zalim Shebzukhov (Emir Salim) †
- Dates active: July 2002 (official declaration of the anti-Russian jihad in August 2004) – 7 October 2007 (Under various names)); 7 October 2007 – 7 February 2017 (As United Vilayat of Kabarda-Balkaria-Karachay
- Active regions: Russian North Caucasus (Kabardino-Balkaria and Karachay–Cherkessia)
- Size: The group's official cumulative total of 500 members in 2002–2007 (many less at any given time); Russian official estimate of no more than 50 active fighters in 2010 (not including supporters)
- Part of: Caucasian Front (2004–2007); Caucasus Emirate (2007-2015); Caucasus Province (since 2015)
- Wars: the Second Chechen War, Insurgency in the North Caucasus, Insurgency in Kabardino-Balkaria and Karachay-Cherkessia

The United Vilayat of Kabarda-Balkaria-Karachay (UVKBK, Russian: Объединенный вилайят Кабарды, Балкарии и Карачая), also known as Vilayat KBK, was a militant Islamist Jihadist organization connected to numerous attacks against the local and federal security forces in the Russian republics of Kabardino-Balkaria and Karachay-Cherkessia in the North Caucasus. Vilayet KBK has been a member of the Caucasus Emirate group since 2007.

The group drew most of its early members from the Balkars, a small ethnic minority in the republic. However, their long-time leader between 2005 and 2010, Anzor Astemirov (Emir Sayfullah), was a Kabardin. Members come from other ethnic groups, including the Karachays and ethnic Russians. The group was named after the 7th-century Battle of Yarmouk.

== Origins ==
The group began as a moderate non-violent organization named the Islamic Center in 1993. The group was renamed the Jamaat of Kabardino-Balkaria when it was not allowed to re-register under the original name in 1997. The focus of the group gradually changed because of persecution by Valery Kokov, the long-time ruler of the Republic of Kabardino-Balkaria, who labeled all alternatives to the local branch of the Spiritual Board of Russia's Muslims, operating the only official mosque in the republic, as Wahhabis, and indiscriminately and brutally harassed them.

Yarmuk was founded as a unit of around 30 Balkars and Kabardinians led by Muslim Atayev (Emir Sayfullah), which trained at the Chechen warlord Ruslan Gelayev's camp in Pankisi Gorge, Georgia. In 2002 the group helped Gelayev's forces in a raid of the village of Galashki in the Republic of Ingushetia. Upon their return to Kabardino-Balkaria, Atayev and his men launched a recruitment drive among alienated and radicalized youth. Mounting pressure from a continued crackdown led the group's leader, Mussa Mukozhoyev (Musa Mukozhev), to join the underground. Many local young radicals had joined the Islamic Peacekeeping Army that invaded the republic of Dagestan from Chechnya in 1999 or fought on the Chechen separatist side in the Second Chechen War.

Radical Chechen commander Shamil Basayev maintained close ties with the local Salafis, living in the town of Baksan for more than a month in 2003, before narrowly escaping a police raid. An Ingush would-be suicide bomber, Zarema Muzhakhoyeva, lived in the republic's capital of Nalchik before going on a failed suicide mission to Moscow. A Nalchik resident housed the alleged organizer of the August 2004 bombing in the Moscow metro.

== Early militant activities ==
In August 2004 Yarmuk announced the beginning of military operations in the republic. Their online manifesto rejected terrorism, referring to alleged government responsibility for the 1999 Russian apartment bombings ("We are not fighting against women or children, like Russian invaders are doing in Ichkeria. We are not blowing up sleeping people, like FSB of the Russian Federation does"). The manifesto noted the corruption of the "mafia clans" that led the republic ("These mere apologies for rulers, who sold themselves to the invaders, have made drug addiction, prostitution, poverty, crime, depravity, drunkenness and unemployment prosper in our Republic").

Yarmuk launched its first attack in Kabardino-Balkaria that same month, ambushing policemen in Chegem district. A turning point came in December 2004, when Yarmuk members conducted a raid on the office of the federal drug control agency in Nalchik, during which they seized large quantities of weapons and ammunition. The founding leader of Yarmuk, Muslim Atayev, was killed when the police stormed an apartment in Nalchik in January 2005. The organization continued to operate, staging attacks under the leadership of his successor, Rustam Bekanov. He was killed three months later and was replaced by Anzor Astemirov, a former deputy director of the Islamic Center. The group's base of operations was Nalchik and the Balkarian enclave around Mount Elbrus.

== Nalchik raid and aftermath ==
Yarmuk was the main force involved in the botched raid by around 100–200 mostly untrained militants on the capital Nalchik in 2005, during which more than 140 people, including 95 alleged insurgents, were killed. Scores of suspects were detained after the attack, and at least 52 were put on trial. The Jamaat apparently lost most of its members, including the deputy leader Ilyas Gorchkhanov. Survivors retrenched, and in late 2007 were subsumed into the United Vilayet of Kabarada, Balkaria and Karachay that would operate not only in Kabardino-Balkaria but also in the neighboring republic of Karachay–Cherkessia after the destruction of its native Karachay Jamaat. The number of attacks attributed to Vilayet KBK at that time had been relatively low, being mostly targeted assassinations such as that of Anatoly Kyarov. One exception was the shooting of a group of nine Russian hunters in November 2007. The militants systematically kept recruiting new fighters and gathering weapons.

== Surge of violence ==
Following the killing of the group's leader Anzor Astemirov in March 2010, the leadership was assumed by more aggressive young commanders like the Baksan area-based Asker Dzhappuyev and the south-west sector commander Ratmir Shameyev, who regrouped Vilayet KBK and changed its tactics. The group went on to perpetrate two high-profile bombings: a blast at the Nalchik hippodrome that injured two ministers during May Day festivities and a sabotage attack on the Baksan hydroelectric power station that inflicted significant economic damage in July. The group was also involved in a large number of near-daily attacks directed against members of security forces. According to a statement made by the Russian federal Interior Minister Rashid Nurgaliyev in November 2010, "the highest level of the terrorist threat in the North Caucasus is in the republics of Dagestan and Kabardino-Balkaria", as the KBR saw six times more gun attacks and nearly five times more explosions in 2010 as in the same period of 2009. The Vilayet KBK fighters began to simultaneously act as a Taliban-style morality police, targeting alleged "dens of vice". Between March and May 2011, the Russian Security Services killed nearly the entire leadership of the Vilayet, including overall Emir Asker Dzhappuyev, Emir Zakaria of the southwestern sector and Emir Abdul Jabbar of the Northeastern Sector.

== Low level insurgency ==
The death of so many commanders led to a decline in the number of rebel attacks in Kabardino-Balkaria, mostly taking the form of attacks on local police officials and police stations. In September 2011 Alim Zankishiev (aka Emir Ubaidallah) became the new leader of the rebels, he was killed by Russian security forces in March 2012. A security operation in Nalchik in September 2012 again saw the killing of several senior commanders (Emir Hamza of the North-Western sector and acting leader of the group, Emir Abdal-Malik of the North-Eastern sector and Shamil Ulbashev, Emir of the Central Sector) in a single operation. Ruslan Baryrbekov (also using the Nom de guerre Amir Khamza) briefly became leader before being killed in September 2012 when Khasanbi Fakov became emir. Fakov was killed by security forces in August 2013 in Nalchik, as was his successor Tengiz Guketlov in March 2014.

Vilayat KBK suffered a split in August 2015, with Robert Zankishiev joining Caucasus Emirate commanders in other North Caucasus republics in pledging allegiance to the Islamic State of Iraq and the Levant (ISIL) leader Abu Bakr al-Baghdadi, while Zalim Shebzukhov led those who retained loyalty to the Caucasus Emirate. Both commanders were killed by Russian security forces in operations in November 2015 and August 2016 respectively.

== See also ==
- Vilayat Galgayche
- Vilayat Dagestan
