= 2004 Nalchik raid =

Terrorist incident in Russia

- Part of the Insurgency in Kabardino-Balkaria and Karachay-Cherkessia
Date	14 December, 2004
Location	Nalchik, Kabardino-Balkaria, Russia
Result	Yarmuk victory

Belligerents
Russia: Kabardino-Balkaria	Yarmuk Jamaat

Commanders and leaders
Unknown	Anzor Astemirov

Strength
4	6–10

Casualties and losses
4 killed	None

The 2004 Nalchik raid was an armed attack against headquarters of the regional branch of the Federal Drug Control Service (FSKN) in Nalchik, capital of the Russian republic of Kabardino-Balkaria in the North Caucasus, which took place at about 3 to 6 a.m. of December 14, 2004.

According to the investigation, six to ten attackers, possibly helped by former or current FSKN staff, entered the building without any resistance, shot dead four officers (two guards, a driver and a member of a special unit, all of them ethnic Kabardins, who were first captured and then executed in the basement), looted armory of rapid-response unit, and then set the office ablaze before driving away in a GAZelle minibus loaded with the captured weapons. According to an initial statements by the authorities, 36 assault rifles and 136 handguns were stolen in the attack. Later, however, figures for the lost weapons were put at 79 automatic and sniper rifles and 182 handguns of all kinds.

It was the first-high-profile operation conducted by the local Islamist rebel group Yarmuk Jamaat after it has officially declared the beginning of jihad against Russia in August 2004. The attack however resulted a major crackdown against Yarmuk, resulting in several arrests and deaths of suspected insurgents, among them the group's first leader Muslim Atayev and his wife who were killed in a police raid the following month. The following year, police recovered many of the seized weapons in the wake of the 2005 Nalchik raid, and over half of the group's members were killed, or captured. Fourteen are the subject of a manhunt.

== See also ==
- 2005 Nalchik raid
