= Battle of Galashki (2002) =

Part of the Second Chechen War

- Part of Second Chechen War
Date	26 September 2002
Location	Galashki, Ingushetia
Result	Russian victory

Belligerents
Russian Federation	Chechen Republic of Ichkeria

Commanders and leaders
Valery Gerasimov	Ruslan Gelayev; Abdul-Malik Mezhidov; Muslim Atayev

Strength
Unknown	100–300 (Note: According to Варывдин 2002, the rebels numbered 100–150 men. According to Myers 2002b, the rebels numbered about 200 men.)

Casualties and losses
~12 killed ~17 injured ~1 Mi-24 helicopter (shot down from MANPADS, the crew died); ~2 armored personnel carriers (according to other sources, 21 servicemen)	76 killed, 5 captured
- Civilian casualties: British journalist Roddy Scott killed

The Battle of Galashki (Russian: Бой под Галашками, romanized: Boy pod Galashkami) happened on 26 September 2002 when Russian federal forces and Chechen rebels had a confrontation in Galashki, Ingushetia.

== Prelude ==
Sergei Fridinskii had reported that on 15 September 2002, 200 militants crossed the Russian-Georgian border. Vladimir Putin had accused Georgia of harboring the Chechen militants in the Pankisi Gorge. He also threatened to have the Russian military deal with the rebels there if Georgia didn't.

In mid-September of the same year, in the base camp located near the Chechen village of Kharsenoy, a meeting of prominent Chechen commanders such as Aslan Maskhadov, Shamil Basaev and Doku Umarov was held. It is possible that during the meeting it was planned to make the raid from the Pankisi Gorge into Russia. It's also possible that so-called "anti-criminal" operations made by the Ministry of Defense of Georgia also gave a reason for the Chechen militants to withdraw from Pankisi Gorge.

== Battle ==
The Chechen militants had aimed to pass through Ingushetia from the territory of Georgia with the aim of further passage to Chechnya. During the night of 26 September 2002, around 100 to 300 Chechen militants under command of Ruslan Gelayev or Abdul-Malik Mezhidov (Note: It's unclear if the commander of the Chechen forces was Ruslan Gelayev or Abdul-Malik Mezhidov. Though, the Chechen rebels claimed on Kavkaz Center that the commander was Ruslan Gelayev.) entered into battle with Russian troops near the Ingush village of Galashki after some of the Chechen militants under command of Abdul Malik were accidentally noticed by the 58th Combined Arms Army of Russian federal forces.

The battle lasted over 10 hours; at around 14:00 Moscow Time the hostilities began to dissipate, because of massive artillery fire of Russian forces on the Abdul Malik's detachment. The artillery fire pushed the remaining militants into an abandoned livestock farm, located about two kilometers from Galashki.

The militants shot down one Mi-24 helicopter from the Igla MANPADS, knocking out two armored personnel carrier with grenade launchers and killing 12 soldiers and officers of the federal troops. Russian troops actively used artillery, aviation, and armored vehicles. 76 militants were killed, several more were taken prisoner. The militants, breaking up into mobile detachments, fled to the territory of Chechnya.

== Bibliography ==
=== English sources ===
- Bagrov, Yu. (2002-10-01). "Chechen Raid Shows Russian Weakness". Edwardsville Intelligencer. Edwardsville, Illinois.
- LaFraniere, S. (2002-09-27). "Russian Troops, Rebels Clash In Fierce Battle Near Chechnya". The Washington Post.
- Myers, S. L. (2002-09-27). "Dozens Killed as Russian Forces Battle Chechen Fighters". sec. A. The New York Times. p. 3.
- Myers, S. L. (2002-09-27). "Russians Battle Chechen Force In Ingushetia For 3rd Day". sec. 1. The New York Times. p. 4.
- "Security Watch: October 2, 2002". Radio Free Europe/Radio Liberty. Prague: Prague Broadcast Center. 2002-10-02.
- Walsh, N. P. (2002-09-27). Rusbridger, A. (ed.). "British journalist dies with Chechens". The Guardian. London.

=== Russian sources ===
- "Боевые успехи Руслана Гелаева" [Combat successes of Ruslan Gelaev]. Коммерсантъ (in Russian). No. 37. Москва: Коммерсантъ. 2004-03-02. p. 5. eISSN 1563-6380. ISSN 1561-347X. OCLC 244126120.
- Вайль, П.; Хасанов, М.; Кобладзе, Г.; Бабицкий, А.; Евтушенко, А. (2002-09-27). "С кем вступили в бой российские войска в ингушском селе Галашки?" [With whom did Russian troops fight in the Ingush village of Galashki?]. Radio Free Europe/Radio Liberty (in Russian). Prague: Prague Broadcast Center.
- Варывдин, М. (2002-09-27). "Своевременная вылазка Руслана Гелаева: бои в Ингушетии" [Timely sortie of Ruslan Gelaev: fighting in Ingushetia]. Коммерсантъ (in Russian). No. 175. Москва: Коммерсантъ. p. 1. eISSN 1563-6380. ISSN 1561-347X. OCLC 244126120.
- Двали, Г.; Скорлыгина, Н. (2002-09-27). "В Ингушетии убит "свободный журналист": Вчера в ходе боев в районе ингушского села Галашки был убит гражданин Великобритании" [A "free journalist" was killed in Ingushetia: A British citizen was killed yesterday during the fighting near the Ingush village of Galashki]. Коммерсантъ (in Russian). No. 175. Москва: Коммерсантъ. p. 4. eISSN 1563-6380. ISSN 1561-347X. OCLC 244126120.
- "Ми-24 сбит боевиками, которыми руководит русский по фамилии Смирнов" [Mi-24 shot down by militants led by a Russian named Smirnov]. NEWSru (in Russian). 2002-09-26. Archived from the original on 2014-02-01.
- Общество (2002-09-26). Кирьян, П. (ed.). "Руслан Гелаев блокирован в ингушском селе" [Ruslan Gelayev blocked in the Ingush village]. РБК (in Russian). Москва: БизнесПресс.
- Речкалов, В. (2004-03-01). "Гелаев вылез из пещеры и наткнулся на пограничный наряд..." [Gelaev got out of the cave and stumbled upon a border patrol...]. Известия (in Russian). Москва: Inews. ISSN 0233-4356. OCLC 427395058.
- Тимофеев, М. (2002-10-04). "Битва при Галашках" [Battle of Galashki]. Независимая газета (in Russian). Москва: Независимая газета. ISSN 1560-1005.
