= February 2004 Moscow Metro bombing =

Chechen separatist suicide bombing in a Moscow Metro

February 2004 Moscow bombing
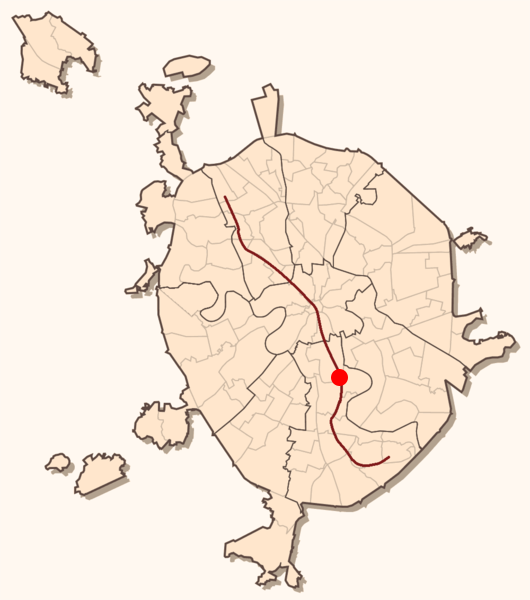
- The location of the metro blast on the map of Moscow
- Location: Moscow, Russia
- Date: Friday, 6 February 2004; 08:32 MSK (UTC+03:00)
- Target: Moscow Metro train
- Attack type: Suicide attack
- Deaths: 41
- Injuries: 250
- Perpetrators: Karachay Jamaat; Idris Gloov; Tambiy Khubiyev; Murat Shavayev; Anzor Izhayev (bomber)

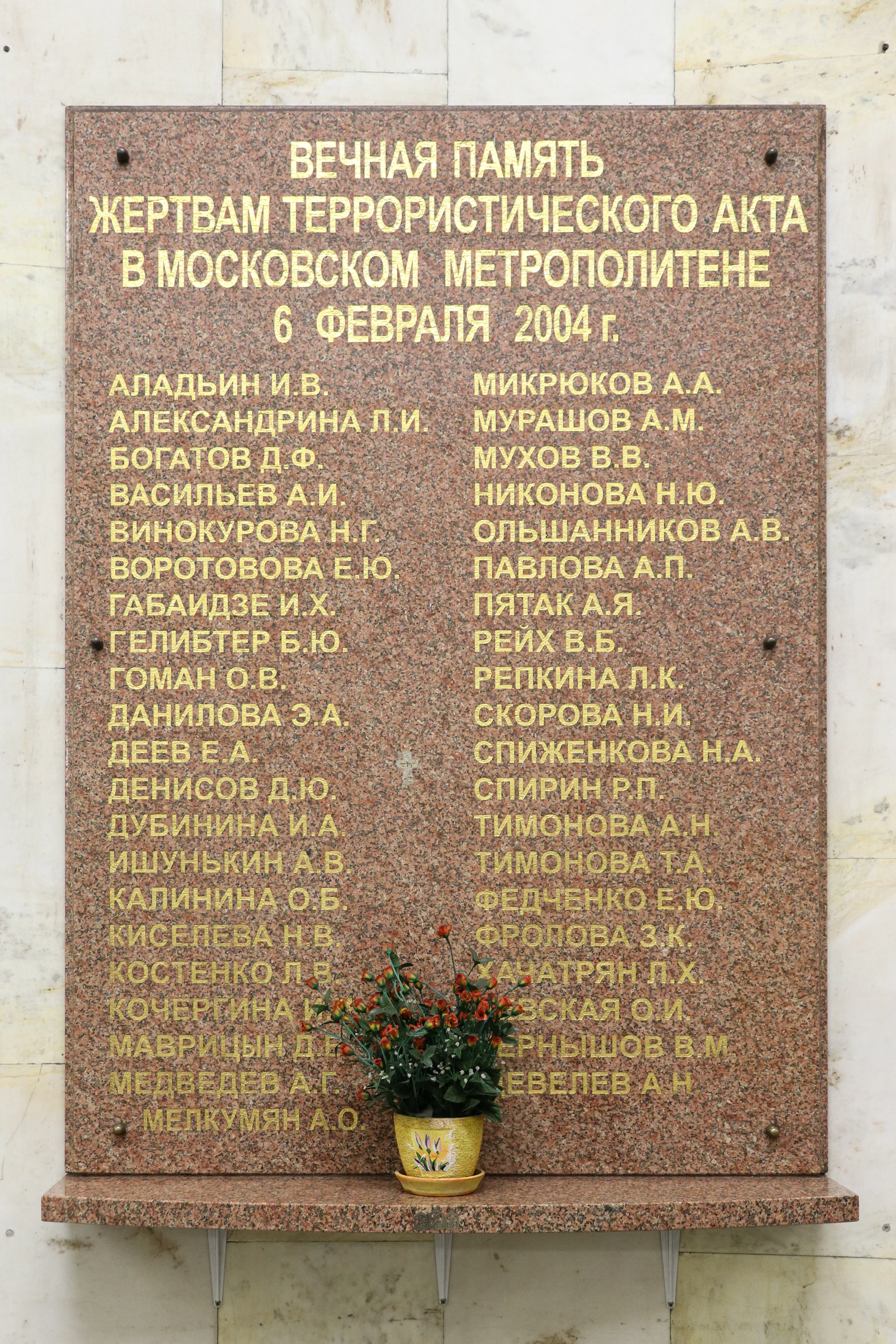
Memorial table for 41 victims of bombing at the metro station Avtozavodskaya.

The February 2004 Moscow metro bombing occurred on 6 February 2004 when a male suicide bomber killed 41 people near Avtozavodskaya subway station on the Zamoskvoretskaya Line in Moscow. Up to 250 people were injured in the incident, some of the more common injuries being broken bones and smoke inhalation.

== Attack ==
The blast occurred at about 08:32 MSK on 6 February 2004 inside a subway car while it was moving in the tunnel near Avtozavodskaya station, on the metro system's Zamoskvoretskaya Line. A Karachay suicide bomber, Anzor Izhayev from the village of Uchkeken, detonated an improvised explosive device in his backpack.

President of Russia Vladimir Putin blamed Chechen separatists for the Moscow metro attack. Chechen rebel leader Aslan Maskhadov denied involvement.

A previously unknown Chechen terrorist group claimed responsibility for the bombing; the claim came from a group calling itself Gazoton Murdash, and signed by Lom-Ali ("Ali the Lion"). According to the statement, the group launched the attack to mark the fourth anniversary of the killing of scores of Chechen civilians by Russian soldiers in Grozny in the Novye Aldi massacre.

== Perpetrators ==
In May 2005, Tambiy Khubiyev and Maksim Panaryin (from the Karachay-Cherkess Republic) along with Murat Shavayev (a native of Kabardino-Balkaria) were arrested by Russian law enforcement agencies in connection with terrorist attacks in Moscow, Voronezh, and Krasnodar. All of the arrested were members of an Islamic militant group Karachay Jamaat (also known as «Muslim Society No 3»). Khubiyev confessed to organizing the bombings near Avtozavodskaya and Rizhskaya subway stations in Moscow and a series of explosions in Krasnodar in August 2003. Panaryin was a suspect in Voronezh bus stop bombings and an explosion next to Rizhskaya station. Shavayev was accused of being an accomplice to Khubiyev and Panaryin during their preparation of the terrorist attacks in Moscow. Murat Shavayev, who was an officer in the Russian Ministry of Justice, denied that he had been involved in any terrorist attacks. However, according to Tambiy Khubiyev's testimony, Murat had assisted Khubiyev and another terrorist, Idris Gloov (who was later killed by the police in a shootout in Stavropol Krai), in construction of the bomb that was used by Izhayev to blow up the subway car in February 2004. Khubiyev also linked Shavayev to the Rizhskaya station bombing in August 2004, stating that the latter had smuggled IED parts to Moscow prior to the attack.

== Legal ==
The trial of the three bombing suspects was held in camera in Moscow City Court in 2006–2007. On 2 February 2007, the judge sentenced all the three to life in prison. Khubiyev and Shavayev each received two life terms for the Avtozavodskaya and Rizhskaya subway station bombings, while Panaryin was sentenced to life for only the August 2004 terrorist attack near Rizhskaya station. In addition to life terms, Shavayev was sentenced to 100, Khubiyev to 150, and Panaryin to 200 years imprisonment on other charges. The court also ordered the accused to pay more than 7 million rubles in moral damages to the victims of the attacks. Shavayev, Panaryin, and Khubiyev tried to appeal their sentences, but Supreme Court of Russia upheld the February 2007 verdict.
