= 2004 Nazran raid =

Chechen–Ingush separatist attack on the former Ingush capital

Nazran raid
- Part of the Second Chechen War
| Date | June 21–22, 2004 |
| Location | Nazran, Ingushetia |
| Result | Chechen victory |

Belligerents
| Russian Federation: Ingushetia | Chechen Republic of Ichkeria: Caucasian Front |

Commanders and leaders
| Abukar Kostoev †; Zyaudin Kotiev †; Sergei Koryakov | (Chechen Republic of Ichkeria) Shamil Basaev (Chechen Republic of Ichkeria) Dokka Umarov (Chechen Republic of Ichkeria) Ali Taziev |

Casualties and losses
| 88–120 killed 6 wounded | At least 6 killed |
- ~25–27 civilians killed Total casualties: 92–98 killed 106 wounded

The Nazran raid was a large-scale raid carried out in the Republic of Ingushetia, Russia on the night of June 21–22, 2004, by a group of Chechen militants led by Chechen commanders Shamil Basaev and Dokka Umarov. Basaev's main goal, besides capturing a large cache of weapons, was a show of strength. The attack by Chechen fighters on the Ingush city of Nazran is associated with the bad attitude of the Ingush authorities towards Chechen refugees.

== Attacks ==
The overnight attacks targeted 15 government buildings in the former Ingush capital and the largest city, Nazran, and three settlements located on the Baku-Rostov highway that crosses the republic from east to west (Karabulak, Sleptsovskaya and Yandare). The attacking force had some Ingush militants. The targets of simultaneous attacks included the Interior Ministry (MVD) headquarters with an arms depot, an FSB border guard unit, the municipal police headquarters, barracks of the OMON special police, police stations and checkpoints. The attackers also tried but failed to free 50 prisoners from a temporary jail and dispersed at 3 a.m., before a column of federal army troops managed to reach Nazran just after dawn at 4 a.m. One Russian military convoy was also ambushed en route from North Ossetia and suffered casualties.

The raid lasted nearly five hours, and the raiders withdrew almost unscathed and with two truckloads with 1,177 seized firearms. The Interior Ministry building and Nazran train station were burned down. Ingush officials said the rebels took some 20 hostages, mostly traffic police officers.

The day before the attack, Chechen separatist leader Aslan Maskhadov, speaking to RFE/RL, claimed rebels are "going to switch to offensive warfare". In July 2004, Maskhadov publicly accepted responsibility for the attack and promised more similar attacks.

== Casualties ==
According to the official figures, 92 people were killed in the raid, including at least 47 police officials, a number later revised downward to 88. The final toll included 27 civilians, 26 policemen (24 Ingush and 2 Chechen), 10 special forces servicemen, 9 soldiers (6 Russian and 3 Ingush), 8 FSB agents, 5 employees of the local prosecutor's office, at least 2 guerrillas and 3 unidentified people. About 106 people were injured, including 51 members of government forces.

The largest group of the dead were local police and other law enforcement officials, whom the rebels said they killed for collaborating with Russian security services in kidnappings and killings of Ingush civilians suspected of sympathizing with the rebels. The killed officials included the republic's acting Interior Minister Abukar Kostoev, his deputy Zyaudin Kotiev, Nazran city prosecutor Mukharbek Buzurtanov, and Nazran district prosecutor Bilan Oziev.

A number of civilians, including the Ingush health minister and a local UN worker, were killed in the crossfire. Only 2 dead rebels were found in the morning after attack, according to Kavkaz Center website, the attackers lost 6 men killed. The KC statement also said that over 120 "servants of Russia" were killed in the attack and 30 policemen were captured.

== Aftermath ==
Army General Vyacheslav Tikhomirov, the Russian Deputy Interior Minister and the commander of Russia's Internal Troops (VV), decided to resign after Federal Interior Minister Rashid Nurgaliev blamed them for the high number of deaths. After Tikhomirov's resignation, the VV remained without a head for a month.

Some 30 suspected rebels, mostly Ingush, were arrested in the next two months over their part in the Nazran raid. Several days after the September 2004 Beslan school siege, Deputy Prosecutor General of Russia Vladimir Kolesnikov said 10 of the weapons stolen in Nazran were used in the Beslan attack. One of the demands of Beslan terrorists was also the release of the raid suspects. In 2005, 13 of them were convicted and sentenced to 8–25 years in prison.

== Books ==
- Коммерсант, власть (in Russian). Издательский дом "[Твердый знак]". 2004.

== See also ==
- 2004 Avtury raid
- 2004 Grozny raid
- 2005 Nalchik raid
- Insurgency in Ingushetia
- Murat Gasaev
