= Anatoly Kyarov =

Russian theater and film actor

Anatoly Sultanovich Kyarov
- Анатолий Султанович Кяров
- Born: 10 November 1957; Nalchik, USSR
- Died: 12 January 2008 (aged 50); Nalchik, Russia
- Military career
- Allegiance: Soviet Union; Russia
- Branch: MVD
- Service years: 1981 – 2008
- Rank: Colonel
- Awards: Hero of the Russian Federation

Anatoly Sultanovich Kyarov (Russian: Анатолий Султанович Кяров; 10 November 1957 – 12 January 2008) was the head of the Russia's Kabardino-Balkaria republic's UBOP (Unit for Fighting Organized Crime). He and his UBOP squad were accused of serious human rights abuses within Kabardino-Balkaria, including of torture and murder.

Kyarov was assassinated on January 12, 2008, in Nalchik together with a senior officer of the OMON special forces, while two other police officers were wounded in the attack. The local Islamist insurgent group Yarmuk Jamaat was seen as responsible for the assassination (its leader, Anzor Astemirov, have previously survived many assassination attempts himself by Kyarov and his men).
