= Ilyas Gorchkhanov =

Ingush militant (1967–2005)

Ilyas Gorchkhanov

Ilyas (Ilias) Gorchkhanov (1967 – 13 October 2005) was the first leader of the Ingush Jamaat, which later became part of the Caucasus Front's Ingushetian Sector in Ingushetia of the Second Chechen War.

Gorchkhanov, an ethnic Ingush, allegedly started his military career as a volunteer fighting in Chechnya. When the Ingush Jamaat started taking shape, he became the leader of the Nazran unit and was later often cited as the leader of the entire Jamaat. He was closely associated with the Yarmuk Jamaat in Kabardino-Balkaria and, together with Anzor Astemirov, was one of the first persons wanting to realize the Caucasus Emirate during the First and Second Chechen Wars.

In October 2005, Gorchkhanov was one of the commanders of the 2005 Nalchik raid, an attack by a large group of militants on Nalchik, the capital of Kabardino-Balkaria, during which he was killed in action; some media reports dubbed him as the leader of the raid. After Gorchkhanov's death, Akhmed Yevloyev succeeded him as the leader of the Ingush Jamaat.
