= August 2004 Moscow Metro bombing =

Terrorist attack at Moscow metro station

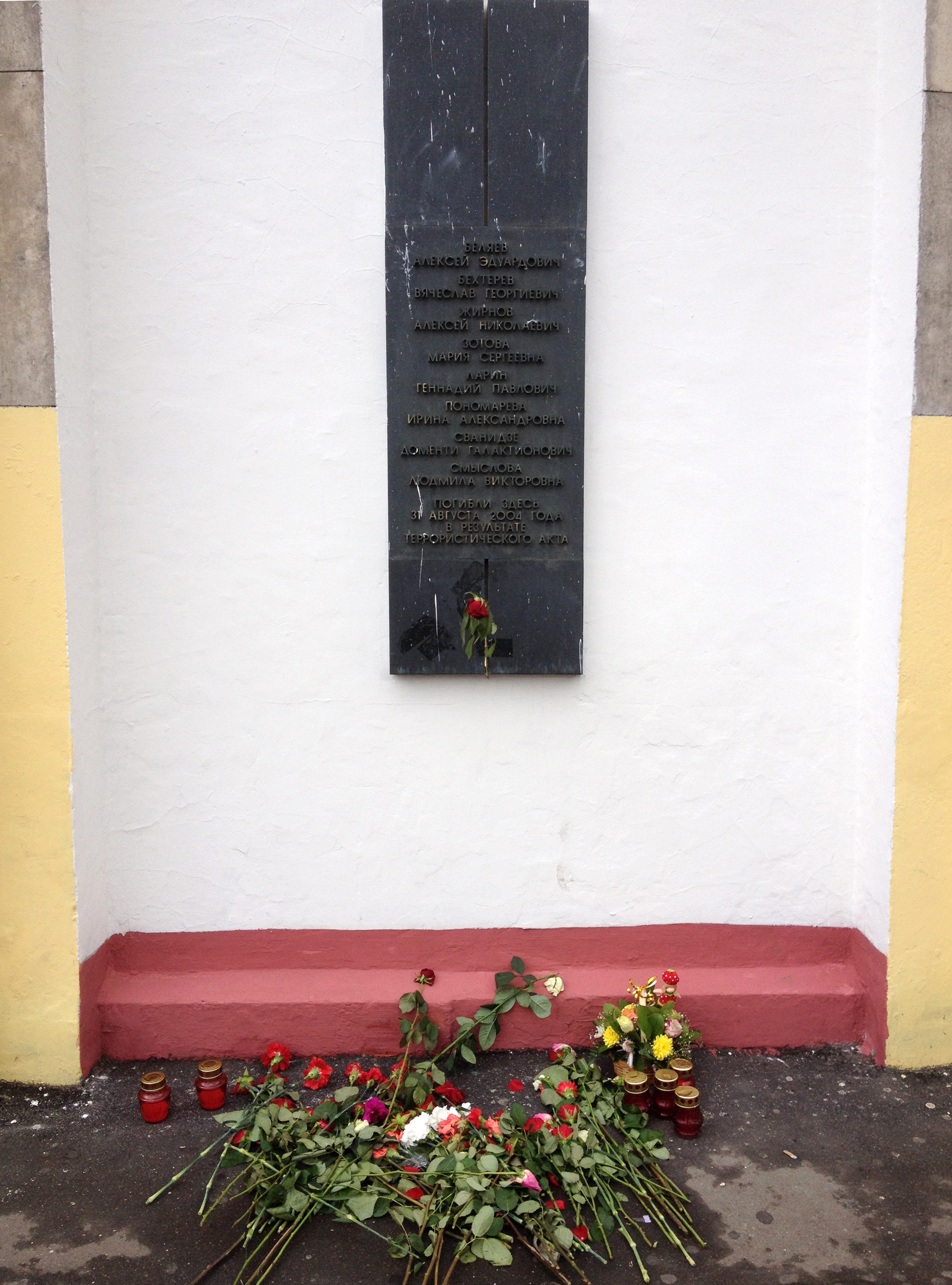
- Memorial plaque to the victims of the terrorist attack at the Rizhskaya metro station
- Location: 55.7925°N 37.6361°E; Moscow, Russia
- Date: Tuesday, 31 August 2004; 20:17 MSK (UTC+03:00)
- Attack type: Suicide attack
- Deaths: 10
- Injuries: 50
- Perpetrators: Karachay Jamaat; Nikolai Kipkeyev; Tambiy Khubiyev; Murat Shavayev; Maksim Panaryin; Unknown female suicide bomber

The August 2004 Moscow metro bombing took place at about 20:17 MSK on 31 August 2004, when a female suicide bomber blew herself up outside Rizhskaya metro station, killing at least 10 people and wounding 50.

The official investigation concluded that it was organized by the same group as the February 2004 Moscow Metro bombing, as well as four previous terrorist attacks on bus stops in Voronezh, southern Russia, in 2004–2005. The deaths included the female bomber and her accomplice, Nikolai Kipkeyev, one of the perpetrators of a series of car bombings in 2001.

Kipkeyev, the head of an Islamic militant group Karachay Jamaat (also known as «Muslim Society No 3») from the Republic of Karachay–Cherkessia, had accompanied an unidentified female suicide bomber who was to blow herself up on a Moscow metro train. But the bomb apparently exploded prematurely while Kipkeyev and the assigned bomber were standing on the street next to the entrance to the metro station. Both died as a result of the explosion.

== Perpetrators ==
In May 2005, Tambiy Khubiyev and Maksim Panaryin (from Karachay-Cherkessia) along with Murat Shavayev (a native of Kabardino-Balkaria) were arrested by Russian law enforcement agencies in connection with terrorist attacks in Moscow, Voronezh, and Krasnodar. All of the arrested were members of Karachay Jamaat. Khubiyev confessed to organizing the bombings near Avtozavodskaya and Rizhskaya subway stations in Moscow and a series of explosions in Krasnodar in August 2003. Panaryin was a suspect in Voronezh bus stop bombings and an explosion next to Rizhskaya station. Shavayev was accused of being an accomplice to Khubiyev and Panaryin during their preparation of the terrorist attacks in Moscow. Murat Shavayev, who was an officer in the Russian Ministry of Justice, denied that he had been involved in any terrorist attacks. However, according to Tambiy Khubiyev's testimony, Murat had assisted Khubiyev and another terrorist, Idris Gloov, in construction of the bomb that was used by a suicide bomber Anzor Izhayev to blow up the subway car on 6 February 2004. Furthermore, Khubiyev linked Shavayev to the Rizhskaya station bombing, stating that the latter had smuggled IED parts to Moscow prior to the attack. It was also revealed that the woman who had detonated the bomb near Rizhskaya station was Gloov's widow: her husband, having helped mastermind the metro bombing in February 2004, was killed in a shootout with the police in Stavropol Krai shortly thereafter.

The trial of the three bombing suspects was held in camera in Moscow City Court in 2006–2007. On 2 February 2007, the judge sentenced all the three to life in prison. Khubiyev and Shavayev each received two life terms for the Avtozavodskaya and Rizhskaya subway station bombings, while Panaryin was sentenced to life for only the August 2004 terrorist attack near Rizhskaya station. In addition to life terms, Shavayev was sentenced to 100, Khubiyev to 150, and Panaryin to 200 years imprisonment on other charges. The court also ordered the accused to pay more than 7 million rubles in moral damages to the victims of the attacks. Shavayev, Panaryin, and Khubiyev tried to appeal their sentences, but Supreme Court of Russia upheld the February 2007 verdict.
