= Anzor Astemirov =

Kabardino-Balkarian militant (1976–2010)

- Anzor Astemirov in 2006
- Native name: Анзор Астемиров
- Nicknames: Sayfullah (Seifullah), Abu Imran
- Born: 3 December 1976; Kremenchuk, Ukrainian SSR, Soviet Union
- Died: 24 March 2010 (aged 33) Nalchik, Kabardino-Balkaria, Russia
- Allegiance: Jamaat of Kabardino-Balkaria; Caucasian Front; Caucasus Emirate
- Commands: United Vilayat of Kabarda, Balkaria and Karachay; Supreme Qadi of the Shariah Court
- Conflicts: First Chechen War; Second Chechen War; North Caucasus Insurgency; Insurgency in Kabardino-Balkaria and Karachay-Cherkessia; 2004 Nalchik raid; 2005 raid on Nalchik

Anzor Eldarovich Astemirov (Russian: Анзор Эльдарович Астемиров; December 3, 1976 – March 24, 2010), also known as Emir Sayfullah (Sword of God) or Abu Imran was an Islamist leader in the republic of Kabardino-Balkaria, in the North Caucasus.

For several years, Astemirov headed the local terrorist group Kabardino-Balkarian Jamaat, eventually becoming the main ideologist of the pan-Islamist militant organization Caucasus Emirate, as well as its wali (governor) of Kabardino-Balkaria. His key position as the Emirate's chief Sharia Islamic law qadi (judge) made him the third in Caucasian insurgent hierarchy, after Dokka Umarov and his military deputy Akhmed Yevloyev. The law enforcement agencies of the Russian Federation put him on federal and international wanted lists for murder, terrorist attacks, armed trafficking and several other crimes and offered a reward of 3 million rubles ($117,354) for information that would lead to his capture. He was killed in a gunfight with Russian security forces in March 2010.

== Biography ==
=== Early life ===
Astemirov was born in Kremenchuk, Soviet Ukraine in 1976 to ethnic Circassian parents from the Kabardian tribe. In early 1990s, he was one of a group of young men sent by the Spiritual Board of Muslims of Kabardino-Balkaria, to study Islamic theology at King Saud University, in Saudi Arabia. Upon his return to Nalchik, the capital of Kabardino-Balkaria, he and Musa Mukozhev became deputy directors of the Institute of Islamic Studies (founded by the former KGB officer Ruslan Nakhushev, who disappeared under mysterious circumstances in 2005), and co-founded the Islamic Center, which years later would evolve into the Yarmuk Jamaat. Astemirov, who was fluent in Arabic, also worked as a correspondent for the Arabic-language TV Al Jazeera. According to some sources, he fought in both Chechen Wars on the side of Chechen separatist forces. In 2001, Astemirov and Mukozhev were both detained by Russian security forces on suspicion of terrorism, however they were released three months later.

=== Militant activities ===
After the death of Muslim Atayev (Amir Sayfullah), Astemirov became the charismatic leader of the Yarmuk Jamaat, and took on the same Islamic nom de guerre as Atayev. Musa Mukozhev (Amir Abu Muhammad) continued to be his closest collaborator. In December 2004, Astemirov gained notoriety when he led a rebel raid against a Federal Drug Control Service (FSKN) headquarters in Nalchik, where several of his associates killed four officers, looted the armory and set the building on fire. In May 2005, Astemirov gave an oath of loyalty to the Chechen separatist leader Abdul-Khalim Sadullayev (Sheikh Abdul-Halim), and Shamil Basayev nominated him as the military amir (commander) of the Kabardino-Balkarian front of the Caucasian Front. In this position, along with Basayev and Ilyas Gorchkhanov, Astemirov was one of the masterminds behind the unsuccessful large-scale raid, in which more than 140 people, mostly alleged insurgents, died in the series of assaults against Russian government building and security forces across Nalchik on 13–14 October 2005. He also publicly promised assassinations of high-ranking officials, businessmen and clergy, and was seen as the key figure behind the January 2008 killing of Anatoly Kyarov, a police official in charge of a special unit that specifically targeted the Yarmuk Jamaat and Astemirov himself.

=== Creation of the Caucasus Emirate ===
In 2008, Astemirov took credit for the idea of the declaration of the Caucasus Emirate in 2007. Astemirov said that after the deaths of Sheikh Abdul-Halim and later Shamil Basayev, he sent a letter to the new Chechen rebel leader Dokka Umarov, asking him what he thought about declaring an Emirate that would replace the Chechen Republic of Ichkeria. Umarov agreed and appointed Astemirov head of the Caucasian insurgency's Sharia Courts, while his predecessor, the Chechen Sheikh Mansur (Amir Mansur/Arbi Yovmurzayev) had been relieved from this position because he was opposed to the creation of an Emirate, and urged saving Ichkeria as a symbol of the Caucasian resistance.

=== Death ===
Astemirov's death was prematurely declared by the Russian authorities on several occasions. For example, in 2005, he was claimed to have been killed along with nine others, in big gun battle in the Nalchik suburb, and in 2009, security officials announced that Astemirov and three others were killed in a special police raid on an apartment building in the city (however, only two bodies were found there and it turned out that Astemirov was not in the targeted apartment). It was eventually confirmed, however, that Astemirov was killed during a shoot-out with police in Nalchik on 24 March 2010, after two suspicious men offered armed resistance when they had been stopped for a routine identity check: one of them managed to escape, but the other one was killed in an exchange of fire, after he had repeatedly shot and wounded by a police officer (also referred to as an FSB agent in some sources). The dead man was almost immediately identified as Astemirov after checking his fingerprints, and his followers also confirmed the death of their leader soon after, in a statement on the rebel website Kavkaz Center.

== Family ==
Anzor Astemirov had a son with his former wife, Zukhra Tsipinova. According to her 2007 public complaint to Vladimir Putin and the other top Russian federal officials, although her five-year marriage to him had been legally dissolved by a court in 2005, she has been exposed to harassment and prosecution by employees of power agencies of Kabardino-Balkaria, including the arrest of her new husband.
