= Muslim society No. 3 =

Russian terrorist group

Muslim society #3 is considered a terrorist group of the Wahhabism stream, operating in Russia. This is on the account of members committing a grouping explosions of apartment houses in Moscow and Volgodonsk in 1999 (307 victims, 1,700+ wounded), 2 acts of terrorism in the Moscow underground in 2004 (52 victims, 300 wounded men), acts of terrorism in Krasnodar (3 victims, 20 wounded men), Voronezh (1 victim, 6 wounded men), Stavropol Territory, the Rostov-on-Don area. It was created in 1995.

It preached ideas of wahhabism, having created branches in Karachay–Cherkessia and Kabardino-Balkaria. The members of the "Society" have developed the plan of the armed capture of authority in Karachay–Cherkessia and Kabardino-Balkaria and creations in their territory of an Islamic state. In carrying out these plans, the wahhabists were not successful because of the beginning of operations in the Chechen Republic in the end of 1999. It then began carrying out acts of terrorism.
