= Muslim Atayev =

Balkar militant (1973–2005)

- Nickname: Sayfullah
- Born: 24 June 1973; Kendelen, Kabardino-Balkaria
- Died: 27 January 2005 (age 31) Nalchik, Kabardino-Balkaria
- Allegiance: Chechen Republic of Ichkeria; Yarmuk Jamaat
- Conflicts: Second Chechen War; Battle of Galashki (2002); Insurgency in Kabardino-Balkaria and Karachay-Cherkessia

Muslim Atayev (June 24, 1973 – January 27, 2005), also known as Emir Sayfullah, was the founder of the militant organization Yarmuk Jamaat, which later became part of the Caucasus Front's Kabardino-Balkarian Sector in the Russian-held Caucasian Muslim state Kabardino-Balkaria of the Second Chechen War. Atayev was an ethnic Balkar and started his military career as a volunteer fighting in Chechnya.

== Biography ==
Muslim Atayev began his military career training in one of the Pankisi Gorge training camps in Georgia. Atayev led a group of an estimated 20-30 volunteers from Kabardino-Balkaria in the Ruslan Gelayev-led field force that crossed back into the North Caucasus republics in the autumn of 2002. After fighting in Ingushetia, Atayev led the KBR guerrillas back into their home republic, creating the Kabardino-Balkarian Islamic Jamaat Yarmuk in August 2004 as a local independent militant operational group.

Atayev and several comrades were killed in a spectacular January 2005 urban gun-battle after being cornered by police in a Nalchik apartment building, that also killed his wife and three other women.

Muslim Atayev was succeeded by Anzor Astemirov.

== Atayev's lost daughter ==
Atayev and his wife reportedly had a baby of which it is still not clear what became of him/her. The prosecutor in Nalchik said that Atayev had a two-year-old son, who has been handed over to relatives and is now with his grandmother in Kendelen. The mothers of both Atayev and his wife Katsieva told the Institute for War and Peace Reporting that they did not have a son but an 8-month-old baby girl named Leila, and that they haven't seen her since. Atayev's mother said her son and daughter-in-law had telephoned relatives during the siege, on the night before the final assault, to say the baby was with them but they hoped they would be allowed to pass her out through the door before any attack took place. The mothers had written to the prosecutor, asking him to return Leila to them, alive or dead. His office publicly denies that any such request has been made.

An IWPR correspondent observed the January 27 assault from 100 metres away, and witnessed special forces carrying a stretcher on which there was something wrapped in white material out of the besieged building an hour and a half before the end of the operation. The bundle looked like the body of a child. They put the body into a police car with dark-tinted windows.
