= 2005 Nalchik raid =

Militant attack during the Second Chechen War in Russia

2005 raid on Nalchik
- Part of the Second Chechen War and the Insurgency in Kabardino-Balkaria
- Aftermath of the raid, a garage in which terrorists held out
Date	8:20 AM, October 13, – 2:00 PM, October 14, 2005 (27:40 hours)
Location	Nalchik, Kabardino-Balkaria, Russia
Result	Russian victory

Belligerents
Russia: Kabardino-Balkaria	Yarmuk Jamaat; Caucasian Front (militant group)

Commanders and leaders
(Kabardino-Balkaria) Saidli Shibzukhov	Anzor Astemirov (Emir Sayfullah); Musa Mukozhev; Emir Ilyas Gorchkhanov † Shamil Basayev

Strength
1,500 regular troops 500 special forces troops	80–300 fighters

Casualties and losses
Russia‘s claim: At least 35 police and army killed, 129 wounded Militants claim: 300 killed	Russia‘s claim: 89 killed 36 captured Militants claim: 41 killed
- Civilians: At least 14 killed and 111 wounded

The 2005 raid on Nalchik was a raid by a large group of Islamic militants on Nalchik (pop. 250,000), in the Kabardino-Balkar Republic (KBR) of southern Russia, on 13 October 2005.

A number of buildings associated with the Russian security forces were targeted. At least 80 people (142 according to official tallies), including at least 14 civilians, were reported to have been killed during the ensuing shooting, which continued into the next day. At least 240 were wounded.

== Attack ==
=== Outbreak of fighting ===
According to the Russian news source Agentura, fighting began about 9 AM on the morning of 13 October,. The initial attack included nine targets:

- Center T anti-terrorist service of the Interior Ministry
- Federalnaya Sluzhba Bezopasnosti (FSB) state security organisation
- FSB Border Guard
- paramilitary OMON riot militsiya unit
- Road Patrol Police Regiment (PPSM)
- federal tax service directorate
- military registration and enlistment office (Voyenkomat)
- Nalchik airport
- regional headquarters of the Russian penitentiary system

Soon after, a gun store called Arsenal was robbed and three police stations were attacked as well.

An attack on the KBR MVD directorate on fighting the organized crime, one more target, was prevented by pure chance. Public transport shut down across Nalchik, and sporadic fighting continued across the city until at least noon.

=== Public announcements and prolongation of the conflict ===
At 1:20 pm, the president of Russia's Kabardino-Balkaria republic, Arsen Kanokov, announced on Echo of Moscow that several of the attackers been taken alive. He also claimed that all enemy combatants seized so far were members of a radical Islamist group known as Yarmuk Jamaat. Radio Free Europe speculated that the name of this group may be a reference to a 7th-century battle in which Arab forces defeated a Byzantine army.

At 1:45, according to an FSB source cited by Echo of Moscow, attackers attempted to seize an FSB building but were repelled. A rebel sniper killed one FSB worker and wounded four, and the building was seriously damaged and caught fire.

At 2:30, a group of policemen located in a building surrounded by attackers managed to free themselves. Agentura also reports that at this time the first communications from the attackers were published on the kavkazcenter website.

At 3:00 RIA Novosti announced, quoting Interior Minister Alexander Alexeyevich Chekalin, that Russian president Vladimir Putin had ordered a full blockade of Nalchik. Chekalin announced that the Interior Ministry, Defense Ministry, and FSB were conducting a joint operation, in which "anyone with weapons in his hands who displays armed opposition, should be subject to liquidation."

By the early afternoon Dmitry Kozak, Vladimir Putin's envoy to the Southern Federal District had arrived in Nalchik from Rostov-na-Donu, and was quoted by Radio Free Europe as saying: The situation is normalizing...At least mass unrest and attacks have been put down. The bandits that today attacked the law enforcement forces have been dispersed. There remain only a few pockets of resistance—two, to be more precise. Fighting is still going on near the Interior Ministry's third department, where unfortunately people are being held hostage. There is an operation going there at the moment. [But] there are no more threats. However, Radio Free Europe also relayed reports from Russia's ORT state television channel that "heavy gunfire could still be heard near the central market by mid-afternoon" and that "explosions were reported in various neighborhoods of Nalchik."

Eventually, most of surviving rebel forces retreated to the mountains.

=== Second day ===
A few, mostly wounded gunmen, who were cut off by federal reinforcements, holed up with police and civilian hostages in captured buildings (including a police station and souvenir shop) but were killed by special forces the following day. According to the Russian officials, no hostages were killed during these final rounds of fighting. According to MSNBC, on the morning of 14 October, attackers fired on a police car in the suburb of Khasanya outside Nalchik, killing two OMON riot police officers.

MSNBC also described the conditions in central Nalchik on the next morning:

Bloodied corpses still lay in the streets on Friday. One was near the entrance to police station No. 2 and the regional anti-terrorist center, where most of the windows had been blown out and even tramway lines outside had been brought down. Seven more bodies were sprawled across the street, most with horrific head wounds. Heavily armed police poked and kicked at the bodies, presumably those of militants, all clad in tracksuits and running shoes. Outside the local Federal Security Service building, several heavily armed officers picked gingerly through a black backpack that had apparently belonged to a militant, pulling out a candy bar, a bottle of water and a black T-shirt.

By midday on 14 October, the head of the regional government Gennady Gubin, told Interfax that "all points of rebel resistance have been suppressed and hostages freed. Now the security forces are conducting a sweep of the city to find terrorists who are hiding." The Russian government had deployed 1,500 regular troops and 500 special forces troops to Nalchik to regain government control of the city.

== Aftermath ==
=== Identity and number of attackers ===
There was an uncertainty about the size of the terrorists force. Russian sources put the figure at between 80 and 300, while Basayev claimed that 217 fighters had been involved. Police told the news agency TASS that the attackers had operated in 10 mobile groups, each with a different set of targets.

MSNBC reported several statements made by Deputy Interior Minister Andrei Novikov to reporters in Nalchik. In particular Novikov announced that:

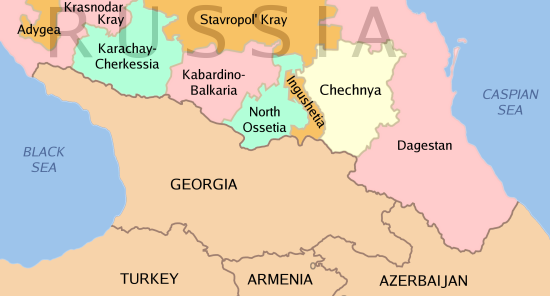
Russian North Caucasus

- Ilyas Gorchkhanov had led the attack, and had been killed
- two-thirds of the militants were local residents
- there had been at least 100 attackers in all
- most were 20 to 30 years of age

Asked about who might have been behind the terrorists raid on Nalchik, pro-Kremlin prime minister of Chechnya Ramzan Kadyrov answered that Chechens had nothing to do with it:

If Chechens had been there, then it wouldn't have ended so quickly. It was their own people there. It was weak guys, which is why it ended quickly – they got the better of them in two hours.

=== Arrests ===
Following the raid, law enforcement officials detained dozens of people; many of the detainees were reportedly tortured. At least one person was reported to have "disappeared" following the raid. Upon investigation, some of the detainees have been charged under nine articles such as terrorism, murder, armed rebellion, and infringement on the life of police officers. There was a number of documented cases of torture of detainees and the investigation was roundly criticized by Russian and international human rights groups. Mass media published photos of the detainees with traces of tortures.

Kommersant reported on 28 October 2006, citing detainees' lawyers, that the charges against 13 of them had been dropped because of an amnesty, while the pre-trial detention period for the remaining 56 was extended to April 2007. Another 39 people accused of involvement in the raid remained at large.

On 27 June 2006, the ex-Guantanamo prisoner, Ruslan Odizhev, a lifelong friend of Anzor Astemirov and suspected of leading the attack on Omon headquarters, was killed in the centre of Nalchik, in an apartment block on Schokenzukov Prospekt, facing the local (official) mosque, while resisting arrest, together with another suspect, Anzor Tengizov.

=== Claim of responsibility ===
After the raid, Arsen Kanokov, the newly appointed president of the KBR, admitted publicly that it could have been triggered at least in part by brutal crackdowns by local police.

The Nalchik attack came just over a year after the Beslan school hostage crisis, for which Basayev also claimed responsibility. An Ingush militant, Ilias Gorchkhanov, leader of the Ingush Jamaat, was said to have been one of the attack's commanders on the ground. Basayev claimed that Russian security forces had been tipped off some five days before the attack, which resulted in increased security in Nalchik, but that despite increased security, the attack was not cancelled.

The raid was reportedly in response to months of persecution of practising Muslims in the region, including arbitrary detention and torture by law enforcement officials, and wholesale closure of mosques.

In April 2006, asked about the upsurge in attacks in Dagestan, Ingushetia and Kabardino-Balkaria and whether fighters there coordinate their actions with the Chechen terrorists, the top rebel commander Doku Umarov responded:

We have three fronts [outside Chechnya] – in Kabardino-Balkaria, Ingushetia and Dagestan. Fighters in Dagestan and Kabardino-Balkaria communicate with the military amir and then through myself. They coordinate all their actions with us. (...) They are ordinary civilians who have risen against arbitrariness toward Muslims in those republics. No matter how hard we try to make them refrain from combat operations, we will not succeed. They are our brothers in faith and therefore we help them – we share our experience and direct them. God willing, we are planning to send our experienced instructors there this year. We will not leave them on their own. It is our duty to help them.

=== Trial ===
Preliminary hearings in the prosecution of 59 men suspected of taking part in the attack began in October 2007, but the trial was then delayed for more than a year as court officials sought to find a team of jurors. Between October 2007 and November 2008, an estimated 1,200 citizens were summoned as potential members of the jury. However, more than 500 never appeared in court, and all but 13 of the remainder asked to be excused. In February 2009, the court finally abandoned the idea of a jury trial, deciding it would go ahead with three presiding judges instead.

The trial proper began in March 2009 in a specially constructed and heavily guarded building in Nalchik and continued as of June 2011. Fifty-eight men are being prosecuted, one of the original 59 accused having died in custody in 2008. The men are indicted on a range of charges including murder, hostage-taking, terrorism and illegal possession of weapons. Nine of the men admit illegal possession of arms, one admits being part of a "criminal armed group" and one has admitted "partial guilt". The rest deny all charges.

During hearings the defendants are held in four or five groups in metal cages and they address the court via microphones placed at the front of each cage.

Several of the men on trial have claimed they were tortured in custody.

The defendants have used court hearings to threaten their enemies in the police and security forces. In February 2011, one of the accused said that Khachim Shogenov, the former interior minister of Kabardino-Balkaria, should be called to give evidence "while he was still alive." He added: "Such people will be killed in this republic. By the time this process ends, praise be to Allah, they will all be destroyed."

== Casualties ==
The Russian government and the terrorists have published significantly different casualty figures. According to the Russian officials, 89 attackers were killed and 36 captured, while 35 federal servicemen and 14 civilians also died. At 15:40 GMT, CNN reported that 97 people were hospitalized in connection with the attack, according to the Russian Health Ministry.

According to the Basayev's later statement, 37 attackers died in the operation. The rebels put the federal losses at over 300 dead and wounded. In his statement, Basayev blamed guerrilla casualties on the information leak before the operation.

=== Bodies controversy ===
According to news reports, some of the dead classified as "terrorists" were actually civilians accidentally killed in the crossfire. There were also reports that young men have simply vanished without a trace despite having no proven connection to the raid, some other allegedly detained in the day after the raid and then presented dead as the killed insurgents. Despite public protests by family members, the bodies were not released.

A year later, many relatives were still demanding in vain that authorities return for proper burial the bodies of 92 men allegedly killed during the attacks; a number of families have taken cases to the European Court of Human Rights in Strasbourg to petition for the return of bodies. In June 2007 the government said it had cremated the bodies of the 95 suspects on 22 June 2006. The relatives argue that the decision, taken by one of investigators for the Southern Federal District, Aleksei Savrulin, and former Deputy Prosecutor for the Southern Federal District Nikolai Shepel, was unlawful.

== Allegations by the Russian government ==
=== Alleged connections with international terrorism ===
On 20 October 2005 Deputy Prosecutor General of Russia Nikolai Shepel, stated that the attack was organized by "International Terrorist Organizations", that also previously organized the Beslan school hostage crisis, raid on Ingushetia, and the attack on Gosnarkocontrol (drug control agency) in Kabardino-Balkaria. The Duma deputy from Chechnya Akhmar Zavgayev also blamed international terrorists for the attack.

Former Guantanamo Bay detainee Rasul Kudayev was arrested in Nalchik for allegedly taking part in the preparation of the attack, and participation in the attack itself (taking the road police post in Khasanya suburb of Nalchik). According to same source Rasul Kudayev pretends being at home at the time of the incident, which can be witnessed (according to his brother) by relatives, neighbours, journalists, and his lawyer.

It was reported that the militants may have planned to overrun the city's airport and use the aircraft there in suicide attacks similar to the 11 September attacks.

=== Alleged financing by foreign intelligence agencies and NGOs ===
The deputy head of the Kabardino-Balkaria Interior Ministry's anti-organized crime department, Albert Sizhazhev, claimed on 14 February 2006, that the attack in Nalchik was financed by foreign intelligence agencies. According to NTV, Sizhazhev said the attack was organized by "ringleaders of the bandit underground of Kabardino-Balkaria" who "had the powerful financial support of foreign special services."

According to ITAR-TASS, the head of the religious affairs department of Kabardino-Balkaria's Ministry of Culture, Dzhambulat Gergokov, claimed that the "bandit underground" in the republic was funded via non-governmental organizations working in Chechnya.

On 17 October 2006, deputy Interior Minister of Russia Arkady Yedelev was quoted by RIA Novosti saying about Anzor Astemirov, one of the organizers of the militant attack:

I will put it straight, that people like [Anzor] Astemirov are linked to the secret services of some countries that are planning blitzkriegs in South Ossetia, Abkhazia and the South Caucasus, and are pursuing a militant escalation on our territory to transfer some of their gunmen from Iraq to Russia.

Yedelev's allegations were repeated by him on 4 June 2007. He did not identify any countries.

== See also ==
- 2004 Nalchik raid
- 2004 Nazran raid
- 2004 Avtury raid
- 2004 Grozny raid
