= Caucasian Front (militant group) =

Chechen Islamist militant group

Caucasian Front (Russian: Кавказский фронт)
- Flag of the Caucasian Front and coat of arms of the Chechen Republic of Ichkeria
- Leaders: Abdul-Halim Sadulayev †; Shamil Basayev †; Dokka Umarov †; Ali Taziev; Abdullah Yandurkaev (Emir Abu Muslim) †
- Dates active: May 2005 – October 2007
- Headquarters: North Caucasus
- Active regions: Russia
- Ideology: Islamism
- Part of: Chechen Republic of Ichkeria
- Wars: First Chechen War; Insurgency in the North Caucasus

The Caucasian Front (Russian: Кавказский фронт), also known as Caucasus Front or the Caucasian Mujahideen, was an Islamic united front militant group, established in May 2005 as a resistance structural unit of the Chechen Republic of Ichkeria's armed forces by the decree of the fourth president of the Chechen Republic of Ichkeria, Abdul-Halim Sadulayev. In September 2006, Ali Taziev was appointed as the emir and commander-in-chief of the Caucasian Front by Dokka Umarov. The group eventually reorganized as "Vilayat Nokhchicho" in 2007 and became a part of the Caucasus Emirate.

== History ==
The group united various rebel Jamaat groups across the North Caucasus, including the Ingush Jamaat, Shariat Jamaat, Yarmuk Jamaat and Kataib al-Khoul, to fight the Russian rule not only in Chechnya but also in the rest of the Caucasus. It was led by a Chechen commander Shamil Basayev until his death in July 2006 and since then by Ali Taziev. In October 2007 the Caucasian Front later became the Caucasus Emirate, a self proclaimed emirate.

While the anti-Russian local insurgencies in North Caucasus started even before the formal creation of the Caucasian Front, two months after Aslan Maskhadov's death, the new Chechen leader Abdul-Halim Sadulayev officially announced that they had formed a Caucasus Front within the framework of "reforming the system of military-political power." The movement had taken on a new role as the official ideological, logistical and, probably, financial hub of the new insurgency in the North Caucasus. Increasingly frequent clashes between federal forces and local rebels continued in Dagestan and Ingushetia, while sporadic fighting erupts in the other southern Russia regions. Before the declaration of the Caucasus Emirate, the movement had conducted two-large scale attacks, the 2004 Nazran raid in Ingushetia and the 2005 Nalchik raid in Kabardino-Balkaria. The movement also launched many smaller attacks such as the 2006 Avtury ambush & 2007 Zhani-Vedeno ambush.

== Fronts of the Caucasian front ==
=== Fronts within the Chechen Republic ===
- Northern Front (later became northeastern front and northwestern front)
- Eastern front (later became southeastern front)

=== Fronts beyond the Chechen Republic ===
In October 2006, Dokka Umarov established two new fronts beyond the North Caucasus region.

- Volga front (became Idel-Ural wilayah)
- Ural front

== Sectors of the Caucasian front ==
The Caucasian Front was also divided into several sectors (wilayat).

- Adygean sector
- Ingush sector
- Kabardino-Balkarian sector
- Karachay-Cherkess sector
- Krasnodar sector
- Ossetian sector
- Stavropol sector

== List of attacks ==
- 2004 Nazran raid: 87 killed
- 2005 Nalchik raid: 138 killed
- 2006 Avtury ambush: 7 killed
- 2007 Zhani-Vedeno ambush: 5 killed

== See also ==
- Islamic International Brigade
