= Insurgency in the North Caucasus =

2009–2017 armed conflict in Russia

- Part of the Chechen–Russian conflict, post-Soviet conflicts and the War against the Islamic State (from 2014)
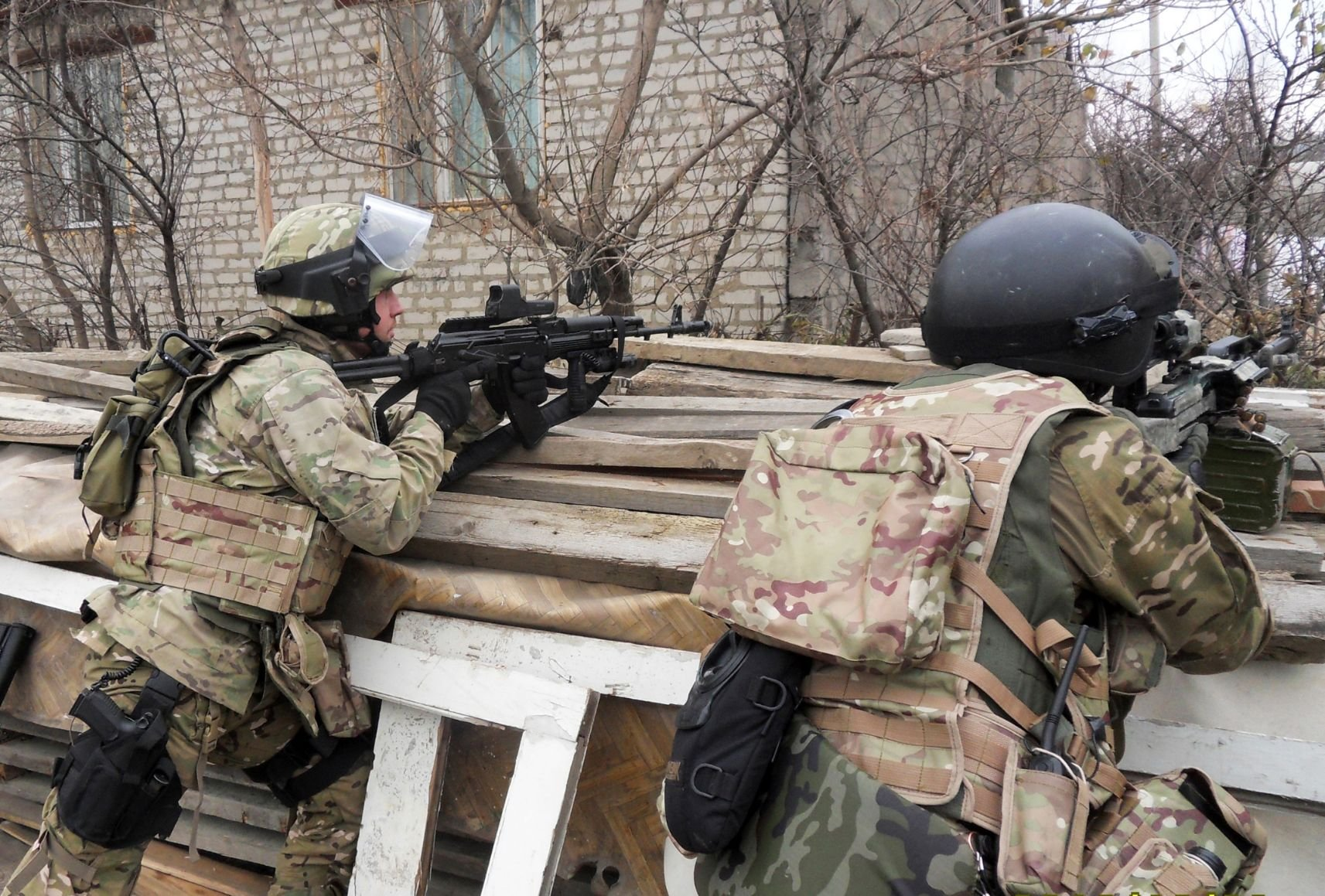
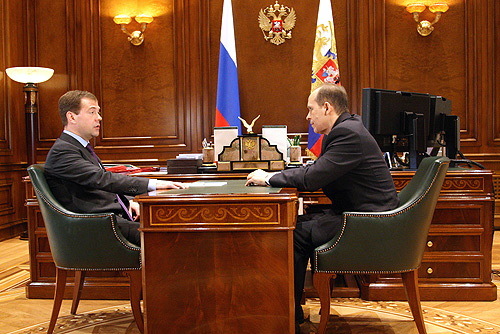
- Top: FSB Spetsnaz members during an operation in Makhachkala, Dagestan. Bottom: Russian president Dmitri Medvedev meets with FSB head Alexander Bortnikov in March 2009 to discuss the ending of the counter-terrorism operation in Chechnya.
Date	16 April 2009 – 19 December 2017 (8 years, 8 months and 3 days)
Location	Russia: North Caucasian Federal District; Chechnya; Dagestan; Ingushetia; Kabardino-Balkaria; Karachay-Cherkessia; North Ossetia–Alania; Spillovers in other districts
Result	Russian victory: Dissolution of the Caucasus Emirate

Belligerents
Russia: Astrakhan Oblast; Bashkortostan; Chechnya; Dagestan; Ingushetia; Kabardino-Balkaria; Karachay-Cherkessia; Moscow; North Ossetia–Alania; Novgorod Oblast; Saint Petersburg; Stavropol Krai; Volgograd Oblast; (Chechnya) Kadyrovtsy; Other loyalists	Caucasus Emirate (2009–2016): Vilayat Dagestan; Riyad-us Saliheen Brigade; Turkish Mujahideen; Vilayat Iriston (2009); Arab Mujahideen (2009–2012); Vilayat KBK (2009–2015); Vilayat Nokhchicho (2009–2015); Vilayat Galgayche (2009–2015); Al-Qaeda; Imam Shamil Battalion (2017–2019); Islamic State; IS–CP

Commanders and leaders
Vladimir Putin; Dmitry Medvedev (Russia) Sergey Shoygu (Russia) Anatoliy Serdyukov (Russia) Valery Gerasimov (Russia) Nikolai Makarov (Russia) Oleg Salyukov (Russia) Vladimir Chirkin (Russia) Aleksandr Postnikov (Russia) Vladimir Boldyrev (Chechnya) Ramzan Kadyrov (Dagestan) Vladimir Vasilyev (Dagestan) Ramazan Abdulatipov (Dagestan) Magomedsalam Magomedov (Dagestan) Mukhu Aliyev (Ingushetia) Yunus-bek Yevkurov (Kabardino-Balkaria) Yury Kokov (Kabardino-Balkaria) Arsen Kanokov (Karachay-Cherkessia) Rashid Temrezov (Karachay-Cherkessia) Boris Ebzeyev (North Ossetia–Alania) Vyacheslav Bitarov (North Ossetia–Alania) Tamerlan Aguzarov (North Ossetia–Alania) Taymuraz Mamsurov	Dokka Umarov † Aslambek Vadalov Aliaskhab Kebekov † Magomed Suleimanov † Zalim Shebzukhov † Chechnya: Khuseyn Gakayev † Tarkhan Gaziyev (POW) Muhannad † Supyan Abdullayev † Abdulla Kurd † Dagestan: Umalat Magomedov † Magomed Vagabov † Israpil Velijanov † Ibragimkhalil Daudov † Said Kharakansky † Ingushetia: Ali Taziev (POW) Said Buryatsky † Dzhamaleyl Mutaliyev † Arthur Getagazhev † Kabardino-Balkaria: Anzor Astemirov † Asker Dzhappuyev † Alim Zankishiev †; Rustam Asildarov †; Aslan Byutukayev †

Strength
(Russia) Undisclosed (Chechnya) 10 groups (Dagestan) 16 groups (Ingushetia) 3 groups (Kabardino-Balkaria) 5 groups (North Ossetia–Alania) none	~600 fighters (government claim, January 2013); ~40 operating groups in the North Caucasus

Casualties and losses
1,139–1,170 killed 2,313–2,677 wounded	2,329 killed 2,744 captured
- 632 civilians killed (2010–2017)

The insurgency in the North Caucasus was a low-level armed conflict between Russia and militants associated with the Caucasus Emirate and, from June 2015, the Islamic State, in the North Caucasus. It followed the (Russian-proclaimed) official end of the decade-long Second Chechen War on 16 April 2009. It attracted volunteers from the MENA region, Western Europe, and Central Asia. The Russian legislation considers the Second Chechen War and the insurgency described in this article as the same "counter-terrorist operations on the territory of the North Caucasus region".

The insurgency became relatively dormant in its later years. During its peak, the violence was mostly concentrated in the North Caucasus republics of Chechnya, Dagestan, Ingushetia and Kabardino-Balkaria. Occasional incidents happened in surrounding regions, such as North Ossetia–Alania, Karachay-Cherkessia, Stavropol Krai, and Volgograd Oblast.

While the insurgency was officially declared over on 19 December 2017 when FSB Director Alexander Bortnikov announced the final elimination of the insurgent underground in the North Caucasus, counter-terrorism operations in the North Caucasus have not ended.

== History and background ==
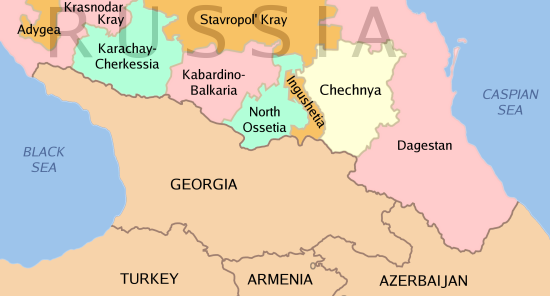
Map of the North Caucasus

In late 1999, Russia's premier, Vladimir Putin, ordered military, police and security forces to enter the breakaway region of Chechnya. By early 2000, these forces occupied most of the region. High levels of fighting continued for several more years and resulted in thousands of Russian and Chechen casualties and hundreds of thousands of displaced persons. In 2005, Chechen rebel leader, Abdul-Halim Sadulayev, decreed the formation of a Caucasus Front against Russia, among Islamic believers in the North Caucasus, in an attempt to widen Chechnya's conflict with Russia. After his death, his successor, Dokka Umarov, declared continuing jihad to establish an Islamic fundamentalist Caucasus Emirate in the North Caucasus and beyond. Russia's pacification policy in Chechnya has involved setting up a pro-Moscow regional government and transferring more local security duties to this government.

An important factor in Russia's apparent success in Chechnya has been reliance on pro-Moscow Chechen clans affiliated with regional President Ramzan Kadyrov. Terrorist attacks in the North Caucasus appeared to increase substantially in 2007–2010. In the summer of 2009, more than 442 persons died in North Caucasus violence in just four months as compared to only 150 deaths reported in the entire year of 2008. In the whole year 2009, according to the official figures by the Russian government, 235 Interior Ministry personnel (Defense Ministry and the FSB losses not included) were killed and 686 injured, while more than 541 alleged fighters and their supporters were killed and over 600 detained. The rate of increase of terrorist incidents lessened in 2010, as compared to 2008–2009, however the rate of civilian casualties substantially increased throughout the North Caucasus in 2010 and a rising number of terrorist incidents took place outside of Chechnya.

In the period from 2010 to 2014, the number of casualties in the North Caucasus insurgency declined each year, with the overall death toll falling by more than half. Reasons suggested for the decline include the deaths of high-ranking insurgency commanders, the increased targeting by security forces of the support infrastructure relied on by the insurgents, and an exodus of insurgents to other conflict zones. A special investigation by Reuters claimed that in the lead-up to the 2014 Sochi Olympics, Russian security services had allowed and encouraged militants to leave Russia to fight in the Syrian Civil War, in order to reduce the risk of domestic attacks.

=== Chechnya ===
The insurgency in the North Caucasus is a direct result of the two post-Soviet wars fought between Russia and Chechnya. The First Chechen War was a nationalist struggle, with both secular and Islamist overtones, for independence from Russia and took place between 1994 and 1996. After a vicious struggle between Russian federal forces and Chechen separatist guerrillas, Chechnya was granted de facto independence per the terms of the Khasavyurt Accord, signed on 30 August 1996. With a devastated infrastructure and various armed factions, subordinate to specific warlords, the next three years saw Chechnya devolve into a corrupted and criminal state, plagued by armed gangs, an epidemic of kidnappings-for-ransom and the rise of radical Islam in the region as a response to suppression.

In August 1999, an armed incursion of 1,500 Islamic radicals, led by Chechen warlord, Shamil Basayev, and Arab jihadist, Ibn al-Khattab, in support of a Dagestani separatist movement, combined with a series of apartment bombings in Russia, gave Moscow sufficient reasoning for re-invading Chechnya, thus triggering the Second Chechen War, a conflict fought with significant Islamist overtones.

Having learned harsh lessons from the first war, the Russian military, rather than getting entangled in messy urban engagements such as that seen in Grozny in 1994–95, relied heavily on aerial bombardment and artillery such as ballistic missiles and fuel air explosives, typically surrounding and then destroying any towns or villages that put up resistance before sending in ground forces for mop-up operations. The second Battle of Grozny in 1999–2000 saw the bulk of Chechen resistance smashed, particularly after a column of some 2,000 fighters attempted to break out of the besieged city in February 2000 and instead walked directly into a minefield that Russian forces had prepared for an ambush. What remained of the decimated rebel units then withdrew into the inaccessible Vedeno and Argun gorges in the southern mountains of the republic in order to wage a guerrilla campaign.

The republic remained a major center of violence for many years. According to Russian figures, between April 2009 (when the anti-terrorist operation in Chechnya was officially ended) and April 2010, 97 servicemen were killed in Chechnya; at the same time, government forces killed 189 persons claimed to be militants or their collaborators. Reported casualties declined, with 26 security forces and 24 suspected militants being killed in 2014.

=== Dagestan ===
Dagestan is the most religious, populous and complex of all the north Caucasian republics. It is double the size of Chechnya and consists of several dozen ethnic groups, most with their own language. The conflict in Dagestan, however, is not between ethnic groups but between Sufism, a syncretic form of Islam which includes local customs and recognises the state, and Salafism, a more traditional form which rejects secular rule and insists that the Salafist interpretation of Islam should govern all spheres of life.

Dagestan has the highest levels of violence and extremism in the North Caucasus republics. The Russian Interior Ministry stated that of the 399 terrorist crimes committed in the North Caucasus in 2013, 242 were in Dagestan.

By 2017, all subversive and terrorist groups operating in Dagestan were eliminated.

=== Ingushetia ===
Along with Dagestan, Ingushetia bore the brunt of the violence in the North Caucasus in the insurgencies early years. The Islamist insurgency in the republic sprang from the wars in neighbouring Chechnya in the 1990s and early 2000s. In June 2004, Ingush and Chechen fighters launched a large-scale attack on Ingushetia's biggest town, Nazran, killing scores of civilians, policemen and soldiers.

As elsewhere in the North Caucasus, the brutality of state security forces has been a major factor, driving young men to join the Islamists. Under the presidency of the former KGB officer, Murat Zyazikov, teams of masked operatives kidnapped, tortured and killed suspected rebels and members of their families. Zyazikov's successor, Yunus-bek Yevkurov, appointed in 2008, had success in dampening the violence, although he was seriously injured in a suicide bombing by the militants during his first year in office. Human rights violations by Russian commandos decreased, but remained widespread.

The capture of Ali Taziev in June 2010, an ethnic Ingush and one of the top leaders of the Caucasus Emirate, dealt a blow to the jihadists in Ingushetia, with the number of attacks falling substantially over the next 5 years. In mid-2015, Ingushetia's president, Yunus-Bek Yevkurov, stated that the insurgency in the Republic had been 'defeated'.

=== Kabardino-Balkaria ===
The insurgency in Kabardino-Balkaria began in the early 2000s and was led by the Yarmuk Jamaat, a militant Islamist jamaat which flourished as a result of persecution of Muslims by police and security forces.

In October 2005, several score of the militants launched a raid on the capital of the republic, Nalchik, which left 142 people dead. The guerrillas have also carried out numerous assassinations of government officials and law enforcement officers.

The republic saw a flare-up of violence in late 2010 and early 2011, in the wake of the death of Anzor Astemirov, a senior figure in the Caucasus Emirate and the head of its United Vilayat of Kabarda, Balkaria and Karachay. The new leaders of Kabardino-Balkaria's guerrilla movement, Asker Dzhappuyev and Ratmir Shameyev, preferred a more aggressive approach and the militants murdered several civilians in the republic, including Russian tourists. In response, an Anti-Wahabbi vigilante group called the Black Hawks threatened the relatives of some of the Islamists. Dzhappuyev, Shameyev and Khamurzov were killed in a special operation by security forces in April 2011.

Casualties fell in the following years. There was a total of 49 people (militants, security forces and civilians) reported killed in the republic over the whole of 2014.

=== North Ossetia–Alania ===
On 9 September 2010, a suicide car bombing occurred at a crowded marketplace in Vladikavkaz, the capital of North Ossetia, killing 19 adults and children, and injuring over 190. President Medvedev responded, that "we will certainly do everything to catch these monsters, who have committed a terrorist attack against ordinary people. What's more, a barbarous terrorist attack. We will do everything, so that they are found and punished in accordance with the law of our country, or in the case of resistance or other cases, so that they are eliminated."

Vilayat Galgayche reportedly took responsibility, stating that the attack was aimed against "Ossetian infidels" on "occupied Ingush lands".

=== Aftermath ===
In 2015, factions of the Caucasus Emirate merged into IS. As of 2020, IS continues to engage in an insurgency in the Caucasus region of Russia. The insurgency decreased between 2021 and 2023, with only a few attacks being conducted. However, IS had a resurgence in 2024, with two major attacks: the May 2024 Crocus City Hall attack by the IS – Khorasan Province and the 2024 Dagestan attacks on law enforcement, churches and synagogues.

As of 2026, the Caucasus region of Russia still faces violence linked to the IS, including a shootout with police that left two militants dead in Dagestan.

== List of clashes in the North Caucasus ==
- List of clashes in the North Caucasus in 2009
- List of clashes in the North Caucasus in 2010
- List of clashes in the North Caucasus in 2011
- List of clashes in the North Caucasus in 2012
- List of clashes in the North Caucasus in 2013
- List of clashes in the North Caucasus in 2014
- List of clashes in the North Caucasus in 2015
- List of clashes in the North Caucasus in 2016
- List of clashes in the North Caucasus in 2017
- List of clashes in the North Caucasus in 2018
- List of clashes in the North Caucasus in 2019

== Casualties ==
Year	Killed	Wounded
2009	508	574
2010	754	956
2011	750	628
2012	700	525
2013	529	457
2014	341	184
2015	209	49
2016	202	85
2017	134	41
Total	4,127	3,487

The majority of the civilians killed were Russians, but also foreigners from Tajikistan, Uzbekistan, Ukraine, Belarus, Germany, Austria, United Kingdom and Armenia were killed in terrorist attacks.

Note: The casualty totals are compiled by the news site Caucasian Knot, which does not vouch for the data's 100-percent accuracy.

== Terrorist incidents ==
- 2009 Nazran bombing
- 2009 Nevsky Express bombing
- 2010 Moscow Metro bombings
- 2010 Kizlyar bombings
- 2010 raid on Baksan hydroelectric power station
- 2010 Stavropol bomb blast
- 2010 Tsentoroy attack
- 2010 Vladikavkaz bombing
- 2010 Chechen Parliament attack
- Domodedovo International Airport bombing
- 2012 Makhachkala attack
- October 2013 Volgograd bus bombing
- December 2013 Volgograd bombings
- 2014 Grozny bombing
- 2014 Grozny clashes
