= List of massacres in Russia =

Since the 13th century

The following is a list of massacres that have occurred in Russia (numbers may be approximate). For massacres that occurred in the Soviet Union, see List of massacres in the Soviet Union:

== Pre-Soviet and Soviet Russia ==
Name	Date	Location	Deaths	Description
Siege of Ryazan	December 1237	Ryazan	Nearly the entire population of Ryazan murdered	Mongols massacred almost the whole population of Ryazan.
Sary-Aka's embassy massacre	31 March 1375	Nizhny Novgorod	unknown	Sary-Aka along with the rest of his embassy were massacred by the Russians.
Siege of Kazan	September–October 1552	Kazan, Khanate of Kazan	Upwards of c. 65,000	Last battle of the Russo-Kazan Wars where the forces of Tsar Ivan IV (The Terrible) besieged the city of Kazan and killed the city's population once taken.
Massacre of Novgorod	1570	Novgorod	2,000-15,000	Attack launched by Tsar Ivan IV (The Terrible)'s oprichniki on the city of Novgorod, Russia.
Fire of Moscow (1571)	May 1571	Moscow, Russia	10,000-120,000	Massacre conducted by Crimean, Nogai and Circassian forces.
Copper Riot	August 4, 1662	Moscow, Russia	Around 1,000	Muscovites riot and demand that Tsar Aleksey Mikhailovich hand over a group of "traitors" thought responsible for economic hardship in the city. Troops under the command of the Tsar put down the riot.
Karamirzey Massacre	April 17, 1825	Circassia	1.700+	The destruction of the Circassian village of Karamirzey by the Imperial Russian Army during the Russo-Circassian War. The Russian forces carried out looting, and arson.
Bezdna unrest	April 1861	Biznä, Kazan Governorate	50+	Russian troops under the orders of Tsar Alexander II put down a peasant rebellion led by Anton Petrov. The rebels were protesting the details of the Emancipation reform of 1861.
Circassian genocide	1800s–1870s	Circassia	1,500,000-2,000,000	The Russian Empire ethnically cleansed the Circassian people. The survivors were exiled to the Ottoman Empire. The Circassian genocide is denied by the Russian government.
Uprising of Polish political exiles in Siberia	June 24–28, 1866	On the Circumbaikal Highway, south of Lake Baikal	300	Uprising by Polish Sybiracy in Siberia put down by Russian troops. Leaders of the uprising are all killed.
Bloody Sunday	January 22, 1905	Saint Petersburg	143–234	Protesters led by Russian Orthodox priest George Gapon were fired upon by the Leib Guard as they marched on the Winter Palace to petition Tsar Nicholas II.
Lena massacre	April 17, 1912	northeast of Bodaybo	150–270	Shooting of goldfield workers on strike in Siberia.
White Terror	1917–1923	Nationwide	20,000-300,000	
Red Terror	1918–19	Nationwide	50,000-600,000	In Crimea alone, 50,000 White PoWs and civilians were executed in 1920. 800,000 Red Army desertees were arrested and many were killed with their families.
Tambov Rebellion	19 August 1920 – June 1921	Tambov Governorate	15,000+ (figure of deaths due to execution only)	Total of 240,000 rebels and civilians killed by communist forces.
Katyn massacre	April–May 1940	Katyn, Tver	10,702 Polish military officers and intelligentsia POWs	10,702 of the 22,000 victims of the Soviet-perpetrated massacre were murdered in Tver and Katyn.
Medvedev Forest massacre	11 September 1941	Medvedev Forest, near Oryol	157	Soviet massacre of political prisoners
Rostov-on-Dov massacre	1942–1943	Zmievskaya Balka, Rostov-on-Don	27,000 Jews and other Soviet Civilians	Organized by Nazi forces; part of the Holocaust in Russia
Nizhny Chir massacre	2 September 1942	Nizhny Chir, Stalingrad Oblast	47	Killing of 47 children with intellectual disabilities organized by Nazi forces
Bolshoye Zarechye massacre	30 October 1943	Bolshoye Zarechye, Leningrad Oblast	66	Soviet civilians were shot and burned alive by the German Army.
Krasukha massacre	27 November 1943	Krasukha, Pskov Oblast	280	Soviet civilians were burned alive by the German Army.
Novocherkassk massacre	2 June 1962	Novocherkassk	26 (officially)	Soviet massacre of rallying unarmed civilians.

== Post-Soviet Russia ==
Name	Date	Location	Deaths	Description
1992 Tatarstan shooting	April 29, 1992	Kazan, Tatarstan	9	Andrey Shpagonov killed nine people and wounded another while trying to steal firearms during a robbery. He was sentenced to death and executed in 1995.
Vyaznikovsky Colony riot	July 6–7, 1993	Vyaznikovsky District, Vladimir Oblast	5	Inmates rioted at a maximum security prison outside Moscow, the toll was five dead and 44 wounded
1993 Russian constitutional crisis	September 21 – October 4, 1993	Moscow	147	437 wounded
Shali cluster bomb attack	January 3, 1995	Shali, Chechnya	55–100	Russian fighter jets dropped cluster munitions on the town of Shali. Targets included a school; cemetery, hospital, fuel station and a collective farm.
Samashki massacre	April 7–8, 1995	Samashki, Chechnya	250+	The massacre of 100–300 civilians in the village of Samashki by Russian paramilitary troops.
Budyonnovsk hospital hostage crisis	14–19 June 1995	Budyonnovsk, Stavropol Krai	166	Some 200 armed men under the command of Chechen warlords Shamil Basayev, Aslambek Abdulkhadzhiev and Aslambek Ismailov occupied key areas of the city of Budyonnovsk. They took hostages and demanded the end of the First Chechen War.
Kizlyar-Pervomayskoye hostage crisis	January 9–18, 1996	Kizlyar and Pervomayskoye-Sovetskoye, Dagestan	26+	Forces led by warlord Salman Raduyev crossed over from Chechnya and took thousands of hostages in Kizlyar. Most were released but at least 26 were killed and some 200 fighters on both sides died during the battle that followed.
Shatoy ambush	April 16, 1996	Yarysh-mardy, Chechnya	100–226	Chechen rebels led by Ibn al-Khattab ambushed and massacres a battalion of Russian soldiers
Kotlyakovskoya Cemetery bombing	November 10, 1996	Moscow	14	A bomb exploded at a cemetery during a funeral for the president of the Soviet-Afghan war veterans group who had been murdered. The group had ties to organized crime. The assailants were two former members of the group who had formed a splinter group.
1996 Kaspiysk bombing	November 16, 1996	Kaspiysk, Dagestan	68	Chechen terrorists bombed an apartment building killing 68 people including 21 children.
Killing of Red Cross workers at Novye Atagi	December 17, 1996	Novye Atagi, Chechnya	7	Unidentified men stormed a Red Cross facility in the village of Novye Atagi. All 7 killed came from outside Russia and Chechnya.
1998 abduction of foreign engineers in Chechnya	October 3 – December 8, 1998	Grozny, Ichkeria	4	About 20 Chechen separatists kidnapped four engineers, three British and one New Zealander. The bodies of the engineers were found on 8 December
1999 Vladikavkaz bombing	March 19, 1999	Vladikavkaz, North Ossetia–Alania	52	Four young Chechen men of the Chechen Repiublic of Ichkeria detonated a bomb in a crowded market, killing 52 people. They also committed two other bombings of a Russian military housing complex and a train station and also kidnapped four Russian soldiers later in 1999.
Russian apartment bombings	September 4–16, 1999	Buynaksk, Moscow and Volgodonsk	293	A number of bombs go off in high rise apartment buildings in three Russian cities. Another bomb was defused in Ryazan. The Russian government blamed the breakaway Republic of Chechnya but a number of conspiracies abound.
Tukhchar massacre	September 5, 1999	Tukhchar, Novolaksky District, Dagestan	6	Mass execution of POWs by Islamic International Peacekeeping Brigade, One tape created in September 1999 showed six Russian servicemen, one as young as 19, being executed by Chechen militants
Elistanzhi cluster bomb attack	October 7, 1999	Elistanzhi, Chechnya	34	Two Russian Air Force Sukhoi Su-24 use cluster munitions on the remote mountain village of Elistanzhi. The local school is destroyed with 9 children inside.
Mikenskaya shooting	October 8, 1999	Mikenskaya, Naursky District, Ichkeria	34+	Ahmed Ibragimov shot 34 Russian inhabitants and wounded more than 20 others
Grozny ballistic missile attack	October 21, 1999	Grozny, Chechnya	118	100 plus people die in indiscriminate bombing on the Chechen capital of Grozny by the Strategic Missile Troops.
Baku–Rostov highway bombing	October 29, 1999	Shaami Yurt, Chechnya	25	Low flying Russian Air Force helicopters perform repeated attack runs on a large numbers refugees trying to enter Ingushetia.
1999 Grozny refugee convoy shooting	December 3, 1999	Goity, Chechnya	Around 40	OMON officers use automatic rifles on a convoy of refugees at a federal roadblock on the road to Ingushetia.
Alkhan-Yurt massacre	December, 1999	Alkhan-Yurt, Chechnya	17–41	Over two weeks drunken Russian troops under the command of General Vladimir Shamanov went on the rampage after taking the town from the forces of Akhmed Zakayev.
Staropromyslovski massacre	December 1999 – January 2000	Grozny, Chechnya	38–56	Summary executions of at least 38 confirmed civilians by Russian federal soldiers in Grozny, Chechnya.
Bombing of Katyr-Yurt	February 4, 2000	Katyr-Yurt, Chechnya	170–363	Indiscriminate bombing by the Russian Air Force of the village of Katyr-Yurt and a refugee convoy under white flags.
Novye Aldi massacre	February 5, 2000	Groznensky District, Chechnya	60–82	The killings, including executions, of 60 to 82 local civilians by special police unit, OMON, and rapes of at least six women along with arson and robbery in Grozny, Chechnya.
Komsomolskoye massacre	March 20, 2000	Komsomolskoye, Chechnya	72	Chechen combantants who surrendered after the Battle of Komsomolskoye on the public promise of amnesty are killed and "disappeared" shortly after.
June 2000 Chechnya suicide bombings	June 6, 2000	Chechnya, North Caucasian Federal District	2 — Russia claimed 27 — rebels claimed	The 17-year-old Khava Barayeva (relative of Arbi Barayev), accompanied by 16-year-old Luiza Magomadova, drove a truck loaded with explosives through a checkpoint of an OMON base at Alkhan-Yurt in Chechnya. Barayeva detonated her bomb outside the barracks, killing a number of paramilitary police troops (rebels claimed up to 27 were killed, but the Russians claimed only two were killed and five were injured)
July 2000 Chechnya suicide bombings	July 2–3, 2000	Chechnya, North Caucasian Federal District	54 (48 soldiers, 6 bombers)	Insurgents launched five suicide bomb attacks on the Russian military and police headquarters and barracks within 24 hours. Six bombers killed at least 37 Russian troops (with four more missing) and 11 civilians, and wounded more than 100 people
2001 Grozny Mi-8 crash	September 17, 2001	Grozny, Chechnya	13	A surface-to-air missile shot down a VIP Mi-8 helicopter over Grozny, killing Major-General Anatoli Pozdnyakov, member of the General Staff of the Russian Armed Forces, Major-General Pavel Varfolomeyev, deputy director of staff of the Defence Ministry of Russia, eight colonels, and three crewmembers.
Tsotsin-Yurt operation	December 30, 2001 - January 3, 2002	Tsotsin-Yurt, Argun, Chechnya	21+	11+ disappeared
Nizhny Tagil mass murder (2002–2007)	2002-2007	Nizhny Tagil, Sverdlovsk Oblast	30	Murders of women by a gang of pimps between 2002 and 2005.
2002 Grozny OMON ambush	April 18, 2002	Grozny, Chechnya	21	Insurgents killed 21 and wounded seven Chechen OMON officers in ambush
Kaspiysk bombing	May 9, 2002	Kaspiysk, Dagestan	44	A bomb planted at a military parade to celebrate Victory Day goes off. The Russian state blamed Rappani Khalilov.
Moscow theater hostage crisis	October 23–26, 2002	Moscow	204	Chechen terrorists under the command of Movsar Barayev storm a theatre in Moscow and took hostages. They demanded an end to the Second Chechen War. They killed some of the hostages and then Russian special forces stormed the building.
2002 Grozny truck bombing	December 27, 2002	Grozny, Chechnya	86	The truck bombing of the Chechen parliament kills 83 people.
2003 Znamenskoye suicide bombing	May 12, 2003	Znamenskoye, Nadterechny District, Chechnya	62	Three suicide bombers rammed a truck into a government building housing the regional headquarters of the Federal Security Service
2003 Tushino bombing	July 5, 2003	Tushino airfield, Moscow	17	Two female suicide bombers detonated during a rock festival at Tushino Airfield.
2003 Stavropol train bombing	December 5, 2003	Yessentuki, Stavropol Krai	46	A suicide bomber detonates a bomb on a commuter train.
2003 Red Square bombing	December 9, 2003	Moscow	6	A female suicide bomber detonates a bomb on a busy street near the Kremlin. The government blames Riyad-us Saliheen.
Moscow Metro bombing	February 6, 2004	Moscow	41	Anzor Izhayev blows himself up on the Russian Metro.
2004 Arkhangelsk explosion	March 16, 2004	Arkhangelsk, Arkhangelsk Oblast, Northwestern Federal District	58	Explosion intentionally caused by Sergey Alekseychik, 170 injured.
2004 Grozny stadium bombing	May 9, 2004	Grozny, Chechnya	10	A bomb exploded in the Dynamo stadium in the Chechen capital, killing the republic's president Akhmad Kadyrov. The explosion was caused by a bomb planted inside a concrete pillar and occurred at 10:35am during a parade and concert celebrating the 59th anniversary of the victory of Germany in World War 2. The blast tore a hole in the section designate for dignitaries. Khussein Isayev, chairman of the Republic's state council, and Adlan Khasanov, a reporter for Reuters, were also killed in the blast. Col. Gen. Valery Baranov, the commander of the Russian military in the northern Caucasus was gravely wounded. Although estimates of total casualties varied, at least ten people were killed and around fifty more injured. Officials believe that the blast was detonated by remote control and was intentionally installed below the VIP section. Rebel leader Shamil Basayev claimed responsibility for the blast.
2004 Nazran raid	June 21–22, 2004	Nazran, Ingushetia	92	A group of Ingush and Chechen militants raided Ingushetia's largest city and attacked several government buildings. In total 92 people, almost all of them civilians and members of the security forces were killed.
2004 Russian aircraft bombings	24 August 2004	Tula and Rostov Oblasts	90	Two airplanes that flew out of Domodedovo International Airport in Moscow were destroyed by 2 Chechen female suicide bombers, killing all 90 people on both flights.
August 2004 Moscow Metro bombing	August 31, 2004	Moscow	11	A female suicide bomber blew herself up outside of the entrance to the Rizhshkaya subway station and the Krestovskiy shopping center. The explosive device was equivalent to 2 kg of TNT. The explosion was intended to occur inside the station, but the woman apparently was afraid of the police searching people and papers at the entrance to the station. The Islambouli Brigade of Martyrs claimed responsibility for the attack. 11 people were killed in the attack and at least fifty wounded. The suicide bomber was identified as Roza Magayeva, the sister of Aminat Nagayev who is believed to be responsible for one of the two airliner crashes on August 24. In a letter, Shamil Basayev claimed responsibility for the incident.
Beslan school hostage crisis	September 1, 2004	Beslan, Republic of North Ossetia-Alania	334	Hostage taking of over 1,100 people ending with 333 people killed in Beslan, North Ossetia.
2004 Nalchik raid	December 14, 2004	Nalchik, Kabardino-Balkaria	4	Armed raid against headquarters of the regional branch of the Federal Drug Control Service (FSKN) in Nalchik by Yarmuk Jamaat
January 2005 Dagestan Raids	January 15, 2005	Makhachkala and Kaspiysk, Daghestan	10	Russian security forces raid two Islamist safehouses in Makhachkala and Kaspiysk, 4 commandos died in the raids as did six militants.
Borozdinovskaya operation	June 4, 2005	Borozdinovskaya, Shelkovsky District, Chechnya	At least 1 killed, at least 11 "disappeared"	Members of the Special Battalion Vostok, an ethnic Chechen Spetsnaz unit of the Russian GRU, killed or disappeared 12 people in the ethnic minority Avar village of Borozdinovskaya, near the border with the Dagestan.
Makhachkala Rus bombing	July 1, 2005	Makhachkala, Dagestan	11	Blast killed 10 soldiers and wounded 7.
2005 raid on Nalchik	October 13–14, 2005	Nalchik, Kabardino-Balkaria	142	Several hundred militants belonging to the Caucasian Front and Yarmuk Jamaat attack several targets across Nalchik, including several government buildings, police stations and the airport. In total, 142 people were killed in the attacks including at least 35 members of Russian security forces, at least 14 civilians and at least 89 militants.
2006 Moscow market bombing	August 21, 2006	Moscow	13	A bomb exploded at Cherkizovsky Market, frequented by Central Asian and Caucasian immigrants. The bombing killed 13 people and injured 47, Eight members from the group The Saviour were convicted for the bombing.
2006 Vladikavkaz Mi-8 crash	September 11, 2006	Near Vladikavkaz, North Ossetia–Alania	12	An Mi-8 helicopter carrying 15 high ranking Russian officers was shot down, killing twelve of the helicopter's occupants. Ossetian rebel group Kataib al-Khoul claimed responsibility.
2007 Balashikha shooting	April 23, 2007	Balashikha, Moscow Oblast	4	Alexander Levin shot four people.
2007 Zhani-Vedeno ambush	October 7, 2007	Zhani-Vedeno, Chechnya	30	At least four local troops killed and 16 hospitalized in the 2007 Zhani-Vedeno ambush. One militant died during the ambush.
Tolyatti bus bombing	October 31, 2007	Tolyatti, Samara Oblast	8	about 50 injured
Sochi bombings	April 3, 2008 — February 20, 2009	Sochi, Krasnodar Krai	8	46 injured
2008 Vladikavkaz bombing	November 6, 2008	Vladikavkaz, North Ossetia	12	A bombing on a microbus killed 11 people and injured 41 more. The attack occurred in the province of North Ossetia bordering war-scarred Chechnya as well as the disputed territory of South Ossetia. Investigators stated that a female suicide bomber may have conducted the attack
2009 Nazran bombing	August 17, 2009	Nazran, Ingushetia	25	At least 25 people were killed by a powerful bomb attack at a police station
2009 Nevsky Express bombing	November 27, 2009	Between Alyoshinka and Uglovka, Novgorod Oblast	28	A bomb detonated on a track and derailed a train of the Nevsky Express, travelling from Moscow to St Petersburg, killing 28 people and injuring up to another 96 No group has claimed responsibility, though Chechen separatists and rebels in the North Caucasus are believed to be the most likely perpetrators for this attack
2010 Moscow metro bombing	March 29, 2010	Moscow	40	40 killed and 102 injured as a result of two separate suicide bombings on Moscow metro
2010 Kizlyar suicide bombings	March 31, 2010	Kizlyar, Dagestan	12	A suicide car bomber detonated outside the offices of the local interior ministry and the FSB intelligence agency. Another suicide bomber impersonating as a police officer then detonated 20 minutes later on the same street as a crowd gathered
2010 Stavropol bomb blast	May 26, 2010	Stavropol, Stavropol Krai,	8	40 injured
2010 Tsentoroy Attack	August 29, 2010	Tsentoroy, Chechnya	33	
2010 Vladikavkaz bombing	September 8, 2010	Vladikavkaz, North Ossetia–Alania	17 (including the perpetrator)	A Suicide car bomber detonated his explosives killing at least 17 and injuring 161
Kushchyovskaya massacre	November 2010	Kushchyovsky District, Krasnodar Krai	12	The stabbing of 12 people (including four children) in the village of Kushchyovskaya.
Domodedovo International Airport bombing	January 24, 2011	Domodedovo Airport, Domodedovsky District, Moscow Oblast	38	Suicide bombing in the international arrival hall of Moscow's busiest airport
2012 Makhachkala attack	May 3, 2012	Makhachkala, Dagestan	13-40	100-130 injured
2012 Moscow shooting	November 7, 2012	Moscow	6	Dmitry Vinogradov shot and killed six people and wounded another at his workplace with a shotgun.
2013 Belgorod shooting	April 22, 2013	Belgorod, Belgorod Oblast	6	31-year-old Sergey Pomazun shot six people dead in a gun store and the street. He was arrested the next day
October 2013 Volgograd bus bombing	October 21, 2013	Volgograd, Volgograd Oblast, Southern Federal District	8 (including the perpetrator)	A Female suicide bomber Naida Sirazhudinovna Asiyalova, who detonated an explosive belt inside a bus carrying approximately 40 people—predominantly students. The bombing killed seven civilians and injured at least 41 others
December 2013 Volgograd bombings	December 29–30, 2013	Volgograd, Volgograd Oblast, Southern Federal District	34 (including the perpetrators)	85 injured
2014 Grozny bombing	October 5, 2014	Grozny, Chechnya	6 (including the bomber)	12 injured
2014 Grozny clashes	December 4, 2014	Grozny, Chechnya	26	14 policemen, 11 militants and 1 civilian were killed. Additionally 36 policemen were wounded in the incident. The Press House was also burned and severely damaged in the incident
Ivashevka massacre	April 24, 2016	Ivashevka, Samara Oblast	6	
2017 Saint Petersburg Metro bombing	April 3, 2017	On a Saint Petersburg Metro train between Sennaya Ploshchad and Tekhnologichesky Institut stations, Saint Petersburg	16 (including the perpetrator)	A suicide bomber blew himself up on the St. Petersburg metro. The bomber was born in Kyrgyzstan and had ties to radical Islamists, 64 injured
Kizlyar church shooting	February 18, 2018	Kizlyar, Dagestan	6 (including the perpetrator)	Shooting at a church by Islamic State. The attacker was shot and killed by police
Kazan school shooting	May 11, 2021	Jaudata Faizi Street, 8, Kazan, Tatarstan	9	A 19-year-old Ilnaz Galyaviev, who got expelled from his college, attacked his former school. He killed two teachers and seven eighth graders.
Perm State University shooting	September 20, 2021	Perm State University, Perm, Perm Krai	6	An 18-year-old student Timur Bekmansurov opened fire near a Perm State University building and inside it. After several minutes he was shot by police and arrested
Veshkayma kindergarten shooting	April 26, 2022	Veshkayma, Ulyanovsk Oblast	5 (including the perpetrator and the gun's original owner)	Ruslan Akhtyamov shot five people with a shotgun, killing four before committing suicide.
Izhevsk school shooting	September 26, 2022	Pushkinskaya Ulitsa, 285, Izhevsk, Udmurtia	19 (including the perpetrator)	34-year old man with mental illness Artyom Kazantsev entered school No. 88 in Izhevsk, where he killed 11 students aged 7 to 15 and 7 workers of school, before committed suicide.
Soloti military training ground shooting	October 15, 2022	Soloti, Valuysky District, Belgorod Oblast	13 (including both perpetrators)	Two conscripts from Tajikistan opened fire, killing 11 people before being killed by returned fire
Crocus City Hall attack	March 22, 2024	Crocus City Hall, Krasnogorsk, Moscow Oblast	151	Several gunmen opened fire and used incendiary devices at a music venue
2024 Dagestan attacks	June 23, 2024	Derbent, Sergokala and Makhachkala, Dagestan	27 (including 5 perpetrators)	Two synagogues, two Eastern Orthodox churches, and a traffic police post were attacked simultaneously with automatic weapons and Molotov cocktails.
Surovikino penal colony hostage crisis	August 23, 2024	IK-19 Surovikino penal colony, Surovikino, Volgograd Oblast	13 (including four attackers)	Four Islamic State attackers took at least four prison guards hostage. Thirteen people were killed, including five employees and all four attackers. Two others are injured

== See also ==
- List of massacres in the Soviet Union
- Russian war crimes
