= Islamic State – Caucasus Province =

Branch of Islamic State active in the Caucasus region

- الدولة الإسلامية - ولاية القوقاز (ad-Dawlah al-Islāmiyah – Wilayah al-Qawqaz); Вилаят Кавказ Исламского государства (Vilayat Kavkaz Islamskogo gosudarstva)
- Logo of Caucasus Province used in ISIL propaganda
- Leaders: Rustam Asildarov (2015–2016) †; Aslan Byutukayev (2016–2021) †
- Dates active: 23 June 2015 – present
- Active regions: Russian North Caucasus
- Ideology: Islamic extremism; Salafist Islamism; Salafist Jihadism
- Size: Unknown
- Part of: Islamic State
- Wars: the Insurgency in the North Caucasus

The Islamic State – Caucasus Province (Note: Arabic: الدولة الإسلامية - ولاية القوقاز, romanized: ad-Dawlah al-Islāmiyah – Wilayah al-Qawqaz, Russian: Вилаят Кавказ Исламского государства, romanized: Vilayat Kavkaz Islamskogo gosudarstva) (IS-CP) is a branch of the militant Islamist group Islamic State (IS), that is active in the North Caucasus region of Russia. IS announced the group's formation on 23 June 2015 and appointed Rustam Asildarov as its leader. Although it was defeated militarily as an organized force by 2017, some lone wolves still act on behalf of the Islamic State. This province does not have a current leader along with the Yemen, Turkey, Azerbaijan and Philippines branches.

== Background ==
Starting in November 2014, mid-level commanders of the Caucasus Emirate militant group began publicly switching their allegiance from Emirate leader Aliaskhab Kebekov to IS leader Abu Bakr al-Baghdadi, following al-Baghdadi and his group's declaration of a caliphate earlier in the year. By February 2015, many commanders of the Emirate's branches in Chechnya (Vilayat Nokhchicho) and Dagestan (Vilayat Dagestan) had defected. Kebekov and senior loyalists within the Emirate released statements denouncing them, and accused the most senior defector, Rustam Asildarov, of betrayal. Further pledges of allegiance to al-Baghdadi occurred in June 2015 by Vilayat Nokhchicho leader Aslan Byutukayev, and in an audio statement purportedly made by militants in Dagestan, Chechnya, Ingushetia, and Kabardino-Balkaria.

== History in Russia ==
On 23 June 2015, IS's spokesman Abu Mohammad al-Adnani accepted these pledges and announced the creation of a new Wilayah, or Province, covering the North Caucasus region. Adnani named Asildarov as the IS leader of this area and called on other militants in the region to follow him.

The group claimed responsibility for its first attack, on a Russian military base in southern Dagestan, on 2 September 2015. In a video also released in September, Asildarov called on IS supporters in the Caucasus to join the fight there, rather than travel to Iraq and Syria.

On 4 December 2016, Russian security services reported that they had killed Asildarov and four of his associates in a raid on a house in Makhachkala.

On 18 February 2018, a 22-year-old man opened fire on a church in Kizlyar, killing 5 and injuring 5. The attacker was later killed by security forces and a video later emerged of the attacker pledging allegiance to the Islamic State, while the Islamic State also claimed responsibility.

On 20 August 2018, multiple young militants attacked a police station in Grozny with knives and injured at least 7 policemen. All attackers were killed; the Islamic State claimed responsibility.

In early January 2019, the group claimed responsibility for the 2018 Magnitogorsk building collapse, and an attack the following day. The group said that the building collapse was caused by bombings. The claim was, however, dismissed by some Russian investigators, who said that the cause of the building collapse was most likely a gas leak.

On 25 January 2019, a group of policemen were attacked by a gunman, in the settlement of Sernovodskoye (Kursky district), causing the injuries of two policemen. The policemen fired back, killing the attacker, whose body was later found next to a Kalashnikov in a forest. The Islamic State group later claimed responsibility for the attack.

On 23 June 2019, a knife-wielding militant attacked two policemen just outside Ramzan Kadyrov's residence in Grozny. The assailant was then killed by the police. A hunting rifle was reportedly found in his car. The Islamic State group later claimed responsibility for the attack.

On 2 July 2019, a law enforcement officer was killed and several others injured at a checkpoint on the outskirts of Bamut when a militant managed to attack police with a knife and a hand grenade. The Islamic State group later claimed responsibility for the attack.

On 21 January 2021, Aslan Byutukayev and five other IS militants were killed in Chechnya.

After 2021, the group's fate is unknown. With the Russian invasion of Ukraine in 2022, the organization became leaderless.

March 2–3, 2024 (2024 Karabulak clash), was a deadly stand-off between Russian security services and a cell of Ingush militants affiliated with Islamic State.

In April 2024, Vilayat Kavkaz (sector Ingushetia) released an audio message regarding the situation of the group, according to them the group is getting stronger, bigger and more active. The group is trying to choose a leader after 2021.

On 22 April 2024, suspected IS gunmen attacked a Russian police patrol in the town of Karachayevsk in Russia's North Caucasus republic of Karachayevo-Cherkessia, killing 2 policemen and wounding a third, in addition to seizing their service weapons (a pistol and rifle) and some ammunition.

On 28 April 2024, suspected IS gunmen attacked a Russian police post in the village of Mara-Ayagy of the Karachay-Cherkess Republic, driving up to the police post before throwing explosives and opening fire, killing 2 policemen and wounding at least 4 others. All of the attackers were allegedly killed during the attack.

== History in Georgia ==
On 22 November 2017, three suspected militants of IS were killed in a raid on a flat/apartment in Tbilisi, Georgia. The raid killed 3 IS Militants, and arrested one, while SSSG suffered 4 wounded men, and later 1 death in a hospital. According to the Georgian security officials, the group planned to carry out terror attacks against foreign diplomatic missions in Georgia and Turkey.

In May 2022, Tbilisi City Court convicted five individuals who had been arrested in August 2021 for membership in IS and plans to travel to a terrorist camp in Syria. In December, State Security Service of Georgia detained Tsiskara Tokhosashvili, the brother of IS commander Tsezar Tokhosashvili, on charges of joining IS and assisting terrorist activities in Syria and Iraq.

In late 2022, the Georgian State Security Service on Thursday announced the arrest of a member of the Islamic State terrorist organisation at Tbilisi International Airport by its Counter-Terrorism Centre. His younger brother Tsezar Tokhosashvili, known as Al-bara Shishani, was arrested in a joint special operation in Kyiv, Ukraine in November 2019 and was extradited to Georgia the following year. Wanted through an Interpol red notice on terrorism charges, he also joined IS in 2015.

On 6 June 2024, the Georgian State Security Service detained and arrested two militants affiliated with IS along with a cache of weapons in the city of Batumi.

On 20 February 2025, the Security Service of Georgia conducted operations against militants affiliated with IS. As a result, RG-42 grenades, F-1 grenades, explosives, detonators, UZRGM fuzes, AK-74 Bakelite magazines and 5.45x39mm ammunition was captured from the raid.

== Designation as a terrorist organization ==
IS-CP was designated as a Specially Designated Global Terrorist (SDGT) organization by the United States on 29 September 2015; Aslan Byutukaev was listed as a SDGT individual on 13 July 2016.

== See also ==
- List of clashes in the North Caucasus in 2015
- List of clashes in the North Caucasus in 2016
- List of clashes in the North Caucasus in 2017
- List of clashes in the North Caucasus in 2018
- List of clashes in the North Caucasus in 2019
