= 2024 Karabulak clash =

Clash between Russian security forces and Ingush militants in Karabulak

- Part of the Islamic State insurgency in the North Caucasus
Date	2–3 March 2024
Location	Karabulak, Ingushetia, Russia
Result	Russian victory

Belligerents
Russia	Islamic State

Units involved
Federal Security Service; Police of Russia	Military of the Islamic State; Islamic State – Caucasus Province; Ingush militant cell

Casualties and losses
(Russia) 3 police officers wounded (allegedly)	(Islamic State) 6 militants killed
- 1 civilian killed (allegedly)

The 2024 Karabulak clash was a deadly stand-off between Russian security services and a cell of Ingush militants affiliated with Islamic State – Caucasus Province. The incident was the most significant clash in years regarding the Islamic insurgencies in the North Caucasus.

== Timeline ==
A cell of six militants, of whom half were wanted by Russian authorities for a previous attack in 2022, barricaded themselves in a third-floor apartment, engaging in a lengthy firefight with Russian special forces. Small-arms fire and explosives were exchanged between government and militant forces for hours continuously. A counter-terrorism operation regime was declared in Karabulak, and the surrounding streets were consequently blocked off, as residents of the apartment complex were evacuated to a nearby school.

By noon of 3 March, TASS reported that the firefight was effectively over and that the militants were all killed, though Russian independent sources claimed that government forces also sustained casualties, and a bystander was killed.

== See also ==
- 2014 Karlanyurt clash
