= List of clashes in the North Caucasus in 2014 =

- 5 October – 2014 Grozny bombing: a 19-year-old man named Opti Mudarov went to the town hall where an event was taking place to mark Grozny City Day celebrations coinciding with the birthday of Chechen President Ramzan Kadyrov. Police officers noticed him acting strangely and stopped him. The officers began to search him and the bomb which Mudarov had been carrying exploded. Five officers, along with the suicide bomber, were killed, while 12 others were wounded.
- 4 December – 2014 Grozny clashes: a group of armed militants of the Caucasus Emirate attacked a traffic police checkpoint outside the city of Grozny.

== See also ==
- List of clashes in the North Caucasus in 2009
- List of clashes in the North Caucasus in 2011
- List of clashes in the North Caucasus in 2012
- List of clashes in the North Caucasus in 2015
- List of clashes in the North Caucasus in 2016
- List of clashes in the North Caucasus in 2017
- List of clashes in the North Caucasus in 2018
- List of clashes in the North Caucasus in 2019
