= 2014 Karlanyurt clash =

Russian political operation

- Part of North Caucasian insurgency
Date	January 15, 2014
Location	Karlanyurt, Dagestan, Russia
Result	Unclear, Russian special forces claim victory

Belligerents
Police of Russia	Vilayat Dagestan

Casualties and losses
3 deaths	4 deaths
- 7 total deaths

The 2014 Karlanyurt clash was an operation by the Russian police to clear a suspected house of militants. At least seven people died in the operation, including three police officers and four militants.

== Events ==
Russian police forces claimed that the operation was launched to kill militants in a suspected house. Russian authorities also claimed that the operation was to also eliminate suspected militants that take part in the North Caucasian Insurgency, which has been going on despite an end to the Second Chechen War.

During the operation, the militants barricaded themselves into the suspected house and a gun-battle soon took place. Russian authorities claimed that during the night, the militants saw the time to attack with automatic weapons and grenades and they opened fire on police, killing three and injuring five. However, the attack was repelled. During the clash, two militants were allegedly killed as well, and the rest fell back to the house and were blocked by police. Several others were also killed.

According to Russian authorities, two militants remained in the house and negotiations were being carried out. Detectives were inspecting the clash site, and the police siege continued. On January 15, Russian special forces claimed that they had cleared the house, that all militants were killed, and the dead bodies were being identified. The police announced that the active phase of the operation was over and that engineers were inspecting the house to find explosives. ITAR-TASS reported that the gunmen put up fierce resistance.

One of the dead militants was Marat Idrisov, who Russian authorities claim was responsible for a string of attacks, including a car bomb attack in Pyatigorsk. Russian media reported that he allegedly stole large amounts of money from a local businessman, killing religious leaders, attacked law enforcers, and was involved in organized crime. Another militant killed was identified as Rustam Dagirov, a local resident who supplied equipment to militants.
