= List of clashes in the North Caucasus in 2016 =

- 15 February - A car bomb killed at least two victims and injured 17 other people in Derbent, Dagestan. The Caucasian branch of the Islamic State claimed responsibility for the attack.
- 9 March - A group of nine human rights activists and journalists, heading to Grozny in a small bus, were attacked on the Kavkaz federal highway, near the Ordzhonikidzovskaya settlement at the Ingushetian border. About 20 masked men assaulted the group, confiscated some mobile phones, and set their vehicle on fire. Two of the journalists, the NGO lawyer and the bus driver were hospitalized. A Committee for the Prevention of Torture representative said, this was the first press tour, that was not organized by the Chechen government.
- 29 March - A bomb, targeting a police cortege, killed one and injured two other people in Makhachkala, Dagestan.
- 30 March - One police officer was killed and another injured in a car bombing in the republic of Dagestan.
- 11 April - Three men, including at least one suicide bomber, had attacked a regional police station in the Novoselitsk district in the city of Stavropol.
- 9 May - At least one policeman was killed and four other wounded in a terrorist attack in Grozny, Chechnya. A terrorist blew himself up, another was killed by security forces.
- 15 May - Two policemen were killed by militants in Derbent, Dagestan. The Caucasian branch of the Islamic State claimed responsibility for the attack.
- 17 June - Four Russian security officers and six militants were killed in an anti-terrorism operation in Dagestan.
- 9 October - Eight militants, who planned attacks in Chechnya, were killed in a shootout with police. Four officers were injured as well.
- 24 November - Two special forces officers and two suspected militants were killed in a gunbattle in Nazran, Ingushetia.
- 4 December - Rustam Asildarov, leader of the Caucasian branch of the Islamic State, was killed in a gunbattle with FSB agents and MVD officers near Makhachkala, Dagestan.

== See also ==
- List of clashes in the North Caucasus in 2009
- List of clashes in the North Caucasus in 2010
- List of clashes in the North Caucasus in 2011
- List of clashes in the North Caucasus in 2012
- List of clashes in the North Caucasus in 2014
- List of clashes in the North Caucasus in 2015
- List of clashes in the North Caucasus in 2017
- List of clashes in the North Caucasus in 2018
- List of clashes in the North Caucasus in 2019
