= List of clashes in the North Caucasus in 2017 =

- 21 January – Two militants were killed in an operation by the Russian security forces at the Vpered settlement, Kizlyar District, in Dagestan.
- 30 January – At least two police officers and three suspected militants were killed during a gunfight in Shali, Chechnya.
- 5 March – A group allegedly linked to the Islamic State (IS) was rounded up by the Russian forces in Derbent, Dagestan; one militant was killed in a shootout.
- 24 March – At least six Russian soldiers and six attackers were killed in the insurgents' attack on a Russian National Guard base at the village of Naurskaya, northwest of Grozny, in Chechnya. IS claimed responsibility for the attack.
- 3 April –
  - Two traffic police officers are gunned down by unknown assailants in Astrakhan. The regional authorities blame the attack on "radical Wahhabi Islamists".
  - 2017 Saint Petersburg Metro bombing: A suicide bombing occurred on the St Petersburg Metro, on the day Vladimir Putin was due to visit the city. 16 people were killed in the attack, including the suicide bomber. 64 others were also injured. Russian media has reported that he travelled to Syria in 2014 and trained with militants. Imam Shamil Battalion claimed responsibility for the attack.
- 8 April – Two traffic policemen were killed after their vehicle came under fire from Islamic militants in Ingushetia, North Caucasus.
- 10 April – About 20 citizens from the Caucasian Republic shot at a gas station by the M4 Don motorway.
- 12 May – One police officer was injured in shooting near police station in Ingushetia. Two attackers were killed during the shootout. IS claimed responsibility for the attack.
- 18 May – Four suspected militants, including a leader of the "Kadar" insurgency group, were killed during shootout with police in the Buynaksky District, Dagestan. Weapons, ammunition, and explosives were found on premises during a police raid.
- 28 August – Two Islamists attacked police officers with knives at the gas station in Kaspiysk. One policeman was killed, another was wounded. Both militants were shot dead.
- 28 August – Two militants were killed in an anti-terrorism operation on the outskirts of the Khasavyurt city. Two police officers also died from injuries received during the skirmish.
- 5 November – A police officer was killed and also two attackers in a shooting during a police control. One of the attackers tried to make a suicide attack but he was shot dead by the security forces.

== See also ==
- List of clashes in the North Caucasus in 2009
- List of clashes in the North Caucasus in 2010
- List of clashes in the North Caucasus in 2011
- List of clashes in the North Caucasus in 2012
- List of clashes in the North Caucasus in 2014
- List of clashes in the North Caucasus in 2015
- List of clashes in the North Caucasus in 2016
- List of clashes in the North Caucasus in 2018
- List of clashes in the North Caucasus in 2019
