= Imam Shamil Battalion =

Militant Islamist organization primarily active in the North Caucasus

- Logo of the group
- Leader: Sirozhiddin Mukhtarov (POW)
- Dates active: April 2017 – December 2019
- Headquarters: North Caucasus, Russia
- Active regions: North Caucasus, Russia
- Ideology: Salafist jihadism; Wahhabism
- Size: 100 (according to the (CFR)
- Part of: al-Qaeda
- Wars: the Insurgency in the North Caucasus and the Global War on Terrorism

The Imam Shamil Battalion (Arabic: كتيبة الإمام شامل, romanized: Katiba Al Imam Shamil, Russian: батальон имама Шамиля) was a militant Islamist organization in Russia. It is a North Caucasus affiliate of Al-Qaeda.

The name of the group is in reference to Imam Shamil, a Muslim leader from Dagestan that fought an invasion by the Russian Empire during the Caucasian War, and was the third Imam of Caucasian Imamate.

== History ==
It is unknown when the group was formed but it rose to public prominence on 26 April 2017, when it claimed responsibility for the 2017 Saint Petersburg Metro bombing. In its statement, it said that the attack was ordered by al-Qaeda's general Emir, Ayman al-Zawahiri, and that the group acts on behalf of al-Qaeda in the Caucasus and the Russian Federation. The attack was in retaliation to Russian military intervention in Syria. The group also pledged to continue launching terrorists attack in Russia until the Russian government withdraws its forces from the Caucasus and Syria. Is speculated that the group is led by Sirozhiddin Mukhtarov, who is also known as Abu Salah al-Uzbeky. In Tajikistan he is known for his connections with Uyghur groups such as the Turkistan Islamic Party and other al-Qaeda affiliates in Syria such as Tahrir al-Sham.
