= 2010 Tsentoroy attack =

North Caucasus Insurgency battle

Coordinates: 42.998409°N 46.2225°E

2010 Tsentoroy Attack
- Part of North Caucasus Insurgency
- Map of Chechen Republic (Chechnya)
Date	29 August 2010
Location	Tsentoroy, Chechnya
Result	Vilayat Nokhchicho Victory

Belligerents
Russia Kadyrovtsy; Russia Pro-Moscow Chechen Law Enforcement	Vilayat Nokhchicho

Commanders and leaders
(Chechnya) Ramzan Kadyrov	Aslambek Vadalov; Muhannad; Zaurbek Avdorkhanov; Emir Markhan; Emir Abdurakhman; Emir Ayub

Strength
(Chechnya) 600 soldiers and police officers	15-30 fighters or 60 fighters

Casualties and losses
(Chechnya) 6 killed (Chechnya) 17 wounded or (Chechnya) 15 killed	12 killed or 8 killed
- Civilians; 7 wounded

The 2010 Tsentoroy Attack was an insurgent operation carried out on the morning of 29 August 2010 by Chechen rebels in Tsentoroy (also known as Khosi-Yurt), Chechnya, the home village and stronghold of pro-Moscow Chechen President Ramzan Kadyrov. The assault - which represented the largest and most audacious attack launched in the republic for over a year - is considered to have "shattered" the image of Kadyrov's unshakeable rule in Chechnya, as it was the first time in six years that his seemingly impregnable village had come under attack.

== Attack ==
According to the rebel website Kavkaz Center, three detachments totaling up to 60 militants (and featuring ten suicide bombers) led by Emirs Zaurbek, Makhran, and Abdurakhman - commanders directly subordinate to Aslambek Vadalov - entered the village around 4:30 a.m. local time. The rebels overran two checkpoints and destroyed an armored personnel carrier before setting fire to ten of the homes of Kadyrov’s closest associates; they also seized ammunition and communications equipment. The militants were said to have employed the tactics of Afghanistan's Taliban, with groups of guerrillas attacking an object and inflicting as much damage as possible with no intention of retreating; some reports claimed that the militants “practically captured” the village for several hours and that the government had to revert to using artillery and helicopters to drive them out. During the fighting the militants managed to send an SMS message to Radio Free Europe/Radio Liberty's North Caucasus service at 6:30 a.m. saying, “Tsentoroy is burning,” and television footage the following day showed a burnt-out car just 150 meters from the entrance to Kadyrov’s fortress-like residence, exhibiting just how deeply the brazen attack had penetrated the village.

The version of events presented by Kadyrov was that his security forces had advance notice of the operation, permitted the fighters to enter the village and disperse, and then cornered them, killing 12 "devils." He also added that the only militants who managed to escape “were filming for a report to their sponsors, but we are confident they will be found.”. Russian officials stated that all twelve slain militants were wearing explosive vests and that seven of those killed had detonated the vests and were thus unidentifiable; rebel sources in the village disputed this, citing unnamed residents of Tsentoroy who claimed that at least some of the dead identified as attackers were actually young men held in Kadyrov’s notorious private prison that were executed on his orders so as to increase the body count. Militant sources would add that the reason they were said to be “unidentifiable” was because it would have been clear that those dead were indeed long-held prisoners rather than members of the insurgent assault team, an allegation that one analyst stated was “entirely in keeping with what is known of [Kadyrov's] treatment of anyone suspected of abetting, or even sympathizing with the insurgency."

Chechen Interior Ministry sources would confirm that the insurgents entered the village and set fire to several homes, and a Chechen security official would also confirm that at least one of the fighters killed was from Zaurbek Avdorkhanov's group. Additionally, it was also reported that the rebels used weapons that were seized from the Ingush Interior Ministry's armory during the Shamil Basayev-led 2004 Nazran raid; among the arms recovered at the scene were seven rocket launchers, three Kalashnikov machine guns, nine Kalashnikov assault rifles, sixteen rounds for various types of grenade launchers, three hand grenades, 1,500 rounds of ammunition of various calibers, eight improvised explosive devices, and ten additional explosive devices.

An expert on the area speaking to the website "Caucasian Knot" called into question Kadyrov's estimate of the attacking force, noting that the number of fighters alleged by the Chechen President would be incapable of launching an attack on the village since "all approaches to Tsentoroy, not to mention the village, are completely controlled by law enforcement. To try and storm the town, where almost every citizen is armed or enlisted in various law enforcement agencies, appears very doubtful...it would be easier to attack Kadyrov's convoy rather than commit suicide by attempting to break into a well-fortified town."

== Aftermath ==
The day after the attack, Vladmir Markin, spokesman for the Investigative Committee of the Prosecutor (SKP) of the Russian Federation, stated that the Central Investigation Department of the North Caucasus and the Southern Federal District would investigate the attacks. On 2 September, Ramzan Kadyrov announced a reward of more than $300,000 for information about each of the insurgency leaders involved in the operation, which Chechen commentators interpreted as an indicator of the government's weakness. Kadyrov also tightened his control over information coming from Tsentoroy by not allowing any of the village's 5,000 inhabitants to leave in the days after the attack; the citizenry were also allegedly under the threat of death not to talk about the siege or the damage inflicted by the rebels.

The operation was also viewed as being impossible without the aid of informants in the circles close to Kadyrov, leading to "massive" interrogations in the village. Some on Kadyrov's side allegedly blamed the incident on Isa Yamadaev's return to Chechnya, thinking that he or some of his associates may have supplied critical information to the insurgents due to a long-running, deadly feud between their two families; nothing has since emerged to tie Yamadaev to the assault in any way.

Most analysis of the attack saw it as a "very painful blow" against both Kadyrov and Moscow. Earlier in the month, a quartet of top insurgent field commanders - including Aslambek Vadalov - had renounced their oaths of allegiance to Caucasus Emirate supreme leader Dokka Umarov in order to continue to fight for Chechen independence rather than a pan-Islamic state encompassing the entire North Caucasus; whereas many commentators expected this to weaken the insurgency, the Tsentoroy attack proved decisively that the Chechnya-based fighters were still a force to be reckoned with. Also in early August, Kadyrov made the outlandish claim that there were a "maximum [of] seventy" Islamist militants remaining in Chechnya; not only did the operation clearly refute that, but it also showed that the rebels still had strategists experienced enough to plan and coordinate a three-pronged attack as well as the types of mid-level commanders capable of carrying it out with minimal casualties.

=== Disputed Reports of Deaths of Zaurbek Advorkhanov and Emir Ayub ===
On 1 August 2012, Kadyrov announced that three militants involved in the attack had been killed in a special operation in Galashki, Ingushetia on 31 July. According to the Chechen president, Russian security forces received information that the militants were due at a private residence to pick up a bride for Ibrahim Avdorkhanov, then laid explosives which detonated and killed the trio. The slain insurgents were identified as Zaurbek Advorkhanov, Ibragim Advorkhanov and Ayub Khaladov, all who indeed participated in the 2010 attack on Tsentoroy.

This account was disputed by Ingush President Yunus-Bek Yevkurov, who said the explosion actually took place on 29 July and that it was an accidental detonation of an explosive device, not a pre-planned operation by Russian security forces. Yevkurov also stated that two men were killed and another injured, and identified the deceased as Idris Abayev and Alikhan Dolkhadov. Following Kadyrov's 1 August statement, Ingush Security Council Secretary Akhmed Kotiyev revised Yevkurov's account, claiming that the men killed were indeed the Avdorkhanov brothers and Khaladov, and that they had been identified through documents they were carrying. This remains unconfirmed, as the Russian government has offered no visual proof and militant groups haven't commented.

== See also ==
- 2014 Grozny clashes
