= List of clashes in the North Caucasus in 2009 =

== January ==
- January 4 - Three policemen were wounded when a bomb detonated in Khasavyurt.
- January 6 - A policeman was severely wounded when a bomb exploded next to his car in Makhachkala.

== February ==
- February 3 - Rebels shot and killed 2 Russian FSB officers in Nazran, Ingushetia.
- February 6 - Dagestani Police killed 3 rebels in a house on the outskirts of the Dagestani capital of Makhachkala.
- February 11 - An explosion at a residential building in Nazran, Ingushetia killed 4 police officers and 3 insurgents. The insurgents were identified as suspected suicide bombers who the police had been looking for. Russian security forces engaged and killed a group of seven rebels in Kabardino-Balkaria, near the town of Gerpegezh. The firefight left one Russian soldier wounded.
- February 12 - Russian forces raided a rebel camp in the forested mountains of Kabardino-Balkaria killing 7 rebels and finding a small weapons cache.
- February 16 - Russian forces in Dagestan raided a house where a group of insurgents were located killing 4 and wounding 2 police reported.
- February 18 - 3 police officers were wounded when their vehicle hit a landmine in Ingushetia. 2 other police officers and a Russian soldier were wounded in a separate attacks by rebels.
- February 26 - A bomb went off as a police van was passing by, wounding 2 policemen and a bystander in Makhachkala.

== March ==
- March 3 - An artillery shell exploded near Nazran, Ingushetia killing 6 people and wounding 2 others. One of the dead was identified as Nazran's deputy police chief, Alexander Gorelkin.
- March 12 - 3 people suspected of firing on a military post were arrested in the village of Surkhakhi, Ingushetia.
- March 19 - A military helicopter had to suspend its flight after the gunner was wounded near the village of Kakashura, Dagestan. In Kabardino-Balkaria a gunfight broke out between Russian troops and militants resulting in 4 militants being killed.
- March 21 - Heavy fighting was reported near the village of Kakashura, Dagestan where Russian troops and insurgents battled for a third day. Police say 5 Interior Ministry soldiers were killed. Between 5 and 7 insurgents were reported killed. Three policemen were also wounded.
- March 23 - Rebels attacked a police patrol in Karabulak, Ingushetia wounding a policeman. The police responded killing 2 rebels in the return fire.

== April ==
- April 13 - Also in Makhachkala, Dagestan rebels shot and killed 2 Dagestani police officers on their way to work.
- April 14 - A gunfight broke out between rebels and police in west Chechnya resulting in 1 police officer killed and 2 others wounded. In Makhachkala, Dagestan police shot and killed 3 rebels in a car after the rebels opened fire on their security post.
- April 16 - A high ranking Russian colonel of the Spetsnaz battalion Vympel died after stepping on a mine while returning from an operation in Chechnya.
- April 22 - Gunmen have killed three Russian soldiers in Chechnya, less than a week after the Kremlin announced an end to a decade of military operations there. The Russian interior ministry said the soldiers were in a car towing a water cistern when they were shot. The militants apparently opened fire from a derelict building in the village of Bamut. In the Kabardino-Balkaria town of Khasanya, Russian special operatives eliminated a long wanted leader of the rebel movement, Zeitun Sultanov, who's been personally close to both Ibn Al-Khattab and Shamil Basayev. Both (allegedly in the case of Basayev) have since been killed by the Russian military. Another rebel was also killed in the operation.
- April 24 - In Derbent, Dagestan, MVD troops surrounded one of the Islamists' field commanders, Zakir Novruzov, who has been operating in Dagestan since at least 2008. The authorities demanded his surrender, which he refused and answered with automatic fire; he was killed after the building was stormed.

== May ==
- May 4 - Militants ambushed a police vehicle near Bamut, Achhoy-Martanovskiy raion in Chechnya, killing one officer and wounding three in the process.
- May 12 - A roadside bomb exploded in Vedenskiy raion as a police car was passing by, killing two officers and a civilian in the vehicle.
- May 15 - Two police officers were killed and five were wounded when a car driven by two suicide bombers drove up to the entrance of Chechnya's MVD building in Grozny and detonated their explosive cargo, killing the militants.
- May 21 - Two rebels were killed two and two Spetsnaz troops were wounded as a result of a standoff with federal forces in an apartment building in Nalchik.
- May 22 - A military water delivery vehicle was attacked by an unknown number of assailants. Three Russian soldiers were killed.
- May 26 - One Russian contract soldier died and two were wounded after a roadside bomb went off next to their armored vehicle in Grozny raion, Chechnya.
- May 30 - One MVD soldier received mortal wounds after stepping on a mine near Vedeno, Chechnya during a reconnaissance mission.

== June ==
- June 5 - The head of the interior ministry of Dagestan, Lieutenant General Adilgerei Magomedtagirov, as well as the head of the Interior Ministry's logistics unit, Aburazak Abakarovwas were shot dead by a sniper while leaving a wedding party.
- June 7 - Musost Khutiev, the assistant of the first deputy chairman of Chechnya's government was shot and killed in Chechnya.
- June 10 - Aza Gazgireeva, a high-ranking judge was gunned down and killed by rebels in Ingushetia. In Dagestan, rebels simultaneously attacked police stations in the town of Karamakh and in Karabudakhkentskiy raion, both were repelled. One police died when rebels attacked his post near Kizlyar. An OMON officer returning from duty was shot in the town of Tyube, near Makhachkala, while in the city itself two more police officers were killed and one wounded when insurgents ambushed their car.
- June 11 - In the North Caucasian republics of Chechnya and Ingushetia lasts since 2 weeks a Counter-terrorism operation. Chechnya's president Ramzan Kadyrov claimed, that already 28 militants had been killed.
- June 12 - Two police officers were killed, while another 2 were injured by rebel action in Dagestan. The leader of the Makhachkala jamaat, Omar Ramazanov, and his helper Makhmud Paizulaev, were both killed in a special operation in Makhachkala, Dagestan. Among the weapons and ammunition found in their car, authorities found a video of the murder of an OMON operative three days prior.
- June 13 - Bashir Aushev, a former top government minister in Ingushetia was killed by automatic weapon fire.
- June 17 - A police captain and his two children were wounded in an ambush when rebels attacked his car with small arms fire.
- June 23 - A suicide car bomber struck the motorcade of Yunus-bek Yevkurov, Ingushetia's president, killing at least one aide and wounding the president critically.

== July ==
- July 1 - One highway patrol police officer died and another was severely wounded in an ambush near the village of Shamhal, Dagestan. In another incident, an unknown number of fighters attacked a police station killing one and wounding two officers in Derbent. Two hours later a car bomb detonated in front of the attacked station wounding an additional 12 people, including 8 civilians. The body of the owner of the car was found in the trunk.
- July 2 - A bomb placed by rail tracks exploded in Kharabudakhkentskiy raion, Dagestan as a repair train was passing by. When investigators arrived a second bomb went off, killing a demolition expert.
- July 3 - Two rebels, one of them female, surrendered after an armed standoff in Nalchik, Kabardino-Balkaria.
- July 4 – 9 police operatives were killed and 10 wounded when militants ambushed their convoy in Sunzhensky District, Republic of Ingushetia, destroying three vehicles. An attack of this scale has not been seen in Ingushetia for quite some time, according to authorities.
- July 5 - A police officer was wounded in Dagestan when suspected militants sprayed with automatic fire the house of the head of Khasavyurt's MVD office, Shamsudin Khamitov.
- July 7 - Magomed Gadaborshev, head of Ingushetia's Forensics and Investigations Center, is shot. He dies two days later. One soldier was killed and six wounded in a firefight with insurgents in Sunzhensky District, Republic of Ingushetia. One rebel was killed by security forces. Two Internal Troops soldiers died and five were wounded after rebels attacked their convoy in Buynaksk raion, Dagestan. An OMON officer is shot and killed in Karabulak.
- July 9 - A police chief was killed and his wife wounded when militants opened fire on their car between the towns of Karabulak and Plievo, Ingushetia.
- July 12 - Five rebels were killed by Russian FSB operatives in Khasavyurt, Dagestan after the rebels opened fire on security personnel during a traffic stop to check identities.
- July 13 - The body of a police officer with head wounds was found in Makhachkala. A police officer was also shot dead by a sniper in Khasavyurt. Two soldiers were killed and five were wounded in an ambush on a military convoy near the village of Karamakhi, Dagestan. A mine was found and neutralized in front of a government building in Nazran. Five militants were killed by police in Chechnya in two separate incidents.
- July 14 - MVD special operatives eliminated three rebels during a clash in the forests near the town of Gubden, Dagestan. One soldier was killed in the operation. The house of the head of Nazran's Interior Affairs was attacked with automatic fire. Two court workers were killed and one was wounded near the town of Gazi-Yurt when their car was ambushed by militants. A police patrol car was also attacked in Malgobek raion.
- July 17 - The driver of the vice-minister of sports and tourism was killed when rebels opened fire on the minister's car.
- July 19 - An insurgent fires on police after a routine traffic stop, killing one and wounding another in Grozny. In the ensuing firefight the security forces killed the rebel with return fire.
- July 21 - Militants ambushed a military truck in Vedeno, Chechnya, wounding instead two civilians that were in a car behind the truck. In another incident a rebel fighter was killed when police stormed his hideout in Grozny.
- July 23 - A booby trap explodes, killing one policeman and wounding another in Vedenskiy raion in Chechnya.
- July 26 - A suicide bomber explodes outside a concert hall in Grozny, Chechnya, killing six people, including four high-ranking police officials. The target was apparently Chechen President Ramzan Kadyrov.
- July 28 - Eight militants were killed by security forces between Talgi and Makhachkala, in Dagestan. Five other rebels were reported killed in armed clashes in Buinaksk raion. Four more were killed by Russian artillery between Kakashura and Gubden, during the initial contact one soldier was killed in the firefight.
- July 30 - Friendly fire incident in Acchoy-Martan, police fired upon a car driven by Yakut police officer sent to Chechnya from Sakha Republic in Siberia for security reinforcement. The shooters misidentified the driver as Alexander Tikhomirov, the alleged mastermind behind the Nazra bombing on August 17. Both the driver and the passenger were killed.

== August ==
- August 1 - The head of the Khasavyurt's Postal office, Gamzat Gamzatov, was killed when a bomb went off underneath his car.
- August 2 - One policeman died and one was wounded when insurgents attacked a police road post in Makhachkala.
- August 3 - Five policemen were ambushed and killed in the Shaori region of Chechnya.
- August 5 - Two SOBR operative were wounded when insurgents ambushed their vehicle in Kizilyurt with small arms.
- August 6 - Assailants ambushed a police car at midnight killing one policeman and wounding another in Khasavyurt.
- August 7 - Three insurgents were killed in a special operation in Malgobekskiy raion, Ingushetia. One of the insurgents was Vitaliy Chernobrovkin, who allegedly devised the kidnapping of the Rosneft vice-president's son on April 13, 2009.
- August 8 - Insurgents opened fire on three policemen as they attempted to check their documents, killing two and severely wounding another. One insurgent was killed in the firefight, the rest escaped. Bitar Bitarov, a prosecutor from Buinaksk was ambushed and killed when insurgents detonated a bomb and attacked with small arms the car he was traveling in. His two bodyguards were wounded.
- August 9 - A roadside bomb killed one Russian soldier and wounded another in Derbent, Dagestan. A police captain was also wounded in a bombing in Vedenskiy raion, Chechnya.
- August 13 - Ruslan Amerkhanov, Ingush construction minister, is assassinated. Also on the 13th, a group of militants numbering between 11 and 15, attacked a police outpost in Buynaksk, killing 4 policemen and 7 civilians who were in an adjacent sauna.
- August 14 - A rebel fighter attacked and killed two highway troopers in Makhachkala. Another was wounded in a separate incident. On the same day, near the town of Sabnava, Dagestan, three rebels attacked MVD and FSB personnel after the car they were travelling in was stopped to check their papers. The security force returned fire and killed all three militants.
- August 17 - 2009 Nazra bombing: A car bomb hits a police building in Nazran, Ingushetia, killing 24 policemen and wounding almost 250, including ten children.
- August 18 - Three rebels linked to the assassination of Russian General of North Caucasus, Valeriy Lipinsky, were chased and killed by MVD troops in Makhachkala. One civilian was wounded. Later that day a bomb killed one policeman and wounded six in the same city. A bomb also went off in Kizilyurt, wounding one policeman and a civilian.
- August 22 - Two to four suicide bombers on bicycles struck Grozny, killing four police officers and wounding one.
- August 23 - Two rebels died in an explosion seemingly caused by improper handling of a bomb near the village of Druzhba, Kayakentskiy raion in Dagestan.
- August 25 - An unknown number of assailants attacked overnight a police station with grenade launchers, causing damage to several vehicles but no casualties.
- August 27 - Three insurgents were killed in a shootout with federal forces in Makhachkala.
- August 28 - A group of militants was surrounded in a counter-terrorist operation in Stavropol Krai, Kabardino-Balkaria resulting in 3 militants being killed. In the firefight the security forces suffered one wounded security personnel.
- August 29 - Russian Security forces killed two rebels in a special operation in the outskirts of Argun, Chechnya.
- August 30 - One rebel fighter was killed in a seek and destroy operation by police operatives combing the forests of Kabardino-Balkaria. His nationality was found to be Azerbaijani. Three suspected insurgents were also captured.
- August 31 - A top Algerian Al Qaeda coordinator in the North Caucasus, also known by the moniker Dr. Muhammad, was killed by the Russian MVD and FSB's Spetsnaz troops in the town of Mutsalaul, within the Khasavyurt region of Dagestan. An off duty OMON operative was gunned down in Makhachkala in his own home in an unrelated incident. A roadside bomb wounded three soldiers after it detonated near the village of Day, Chechnya.

== September ==
- September 1 - A suicide car bomb exploded at a police checkpoint on the outskirts of Makhachkala when traffic police stopped the car to check for documents. The blast killed 1 bystander and wounded six police officers, as well as three medical personnel. According to the initial investigation the rebels were planning to detonate it in a more spectacular fashion for September 1, the first day of school nationwide in Russia, similarly to the Beslan school hostage crisis in 2004.
- September 3–4 would-be suicide bombers were captured in Chechnya with weapons and explosive belts with attached detonators. Chechen President Ramzan Kadyrov personally came to interrogate the rebels who, according to reports, were planning to blow themselves up in Grozny's Leningradskiy raion.
- September 4 - In Nazran, 2 militants were killed when they opened fire on FSB and police forces after the car was stopped for an ID check. Another militant who escaped in the initial firefight was killed later and was identified as Rustam Dzorov, head commander of all Ingushetian rebel operations and an organizer of the assassination attempt on Yunus-bek Yevkurov in June.
- September 5 - Security forces killed a would-be suicide bomber near Gudermes, an explosive belt and seven detonators were found on the body. Authorities believe that he was planning to stage a suicide bomb attack in Moscow.
- September 6 - A police lieutenant was shot and killed in Grozny. The assailant also stole the officer's automatic rifle. Near Shalazhi, Chechnya, a police officer was wounded after an explosive device detonated next to him. Soon after, an armed clash with rebel fighters occurred close to the first incident, during which another officer suffered injuries.
- September 7 - A soldier was wounded after a bomb went off near Urus-Martan during a sweep. Another received bullet wounds in a firefight that ensued with the rebels.
- September 9 - In Magas, the capital of Ingushetia, a shootout between local police and militants occurred. 2 militants were killed and two civilians wounded.
- September 12 - An Investigator from the Interior Ministry of Ingushetia was shot dead outside his home. Near the Chechen town of Rubezhnoe, Naurskiy raion, 1 suspected militant was killed by security forces after he resisted arrest with automatic fire.
- September 13 - A suicide bomber detonated himself at a Border Police Post in Ingushetia. The police post and several nearby homes were damaged. 2 Traffic police officers were killed, and 5 civilians were wounded. A shootout between Security forces and militants followed. In Argun, insurgents also attacked two police officers on duty with automatic fire, killing both of them.
- September 16 - At least two police officers and four civilians have been injured after a female suicide bomber self-detonated in an attack targeted inside Chechnya's capital of Grozny.
- September 20 - A leading Muslim cleric, Ismail Bostanov, was shot dead while driving his car in the Karachayevo-Cherkessia region of Southern Russia. Islamist militants are believed to be behind the attack.
- September 24 - Two militants, were captured in Chechnya, one in Grozny and one in the village of Valerik, Acchoy-Martan raion. One of the militants tipped off the authorities about a cache of weapons which was also seized.
- September 25 - A bomb explodes in Ingushetia in Sunzhensky District, near the house of the district administration head Islam Saynaroeva. No casualties were reported in the blast.
- September 26 - In Grozny, 1 militant was killed in the early hours of the morning by police after resisting arrest and opening fire, in the Staropromyslovsky district of Grozny. Meanwhile in the Zavodskoy district of the Chechen capital, police killed yet 1 other militant who had put up armed resistance whilst also resisting arrest by the police. Later on In Chechnya in the Achkhoy-Martan district, two militants opened fire in a car, on the head of local administration Ali Artamov and his bodyguard. As a result, Ali Artamov died at the scene and his bodyguard was injured.
- September 27 - 2 militants have been shot dead by police in the Shatoy district in the republic of Chechnya. The deputy chief of the criminal investigation department for Dagestan, Colonel Alim Atuev Sultan, and his cousin were shot dead by unknown militants outside a house, in the Kizilyurt district of Dagestan.
- September 28 - In the Nazran district of Ingushetia, unidentified militants shot at a private home, occupied by the head of local administration, Nuradin Ekazhev. The firing caused no victims or casualties.
- September 30 - An investigator named Gamzat Musaev was shot and killed in a friendly fire incident after he failed to stop his car and ignored warning shots by police.

== October ==
- October 2 - A group of militants was located on the outskirts of Buinaksk, Dagestan; after refusing to surrender 2 militants were killed in a firefight, the rest escaped. No losses were sustained by the security forces. The same day, 8 militants were killed when a combined force of police and MVD troops engaged a band of up to 20 militants in Nozhay-Yurt raion, Chechnya, suffering no casualties themselves. One police officer was killed, three were wounded and a civilian was also wounded in Prohladny, Kabardino-Balkaria, when rebels opened fire on a traffic police post. After the chase, the militants were surrounded and besieged in a building, eventually they were killed on October 5.
- October 4 - Police found and defused a car bomb using a robot to neutralize it, in Derbent, Dagestan.
- October 5 - 4 militants were killed in a counter-terrorist operation in Prohladny, Kabardino-Balkaria. Only one of the rebels was identified, the other three were burned beyond recognition in the ensuing firefight with the security forces.
- October 7 - Spetsnaz soldiers located a rebel base in Shalinskiy raion of Chechnya, guarded by a militant. The 1 militant was killed when he refused to surrender. In Ingushetia, three rebels were captured by police.
- October 8 - In the Kizilyurt district of Dagestan in a private home, FSB special forces blocked the house of the so-called amir of the Makhachkala jamaat, Gadzhimurad Kamalutdinov. In the storming of the residence both Kamalutdinov and his wife were killed by the federal Spetsnaz troops.
- October 9 - A car exploded in Ingushetia after a bomb with the equivalent of 1 kg of TNT detonated. In another separate incident, an unidentified explosive device detonated in a city park in the Dagestani town of Derbent. According to the city's law enforcement, 1 person was killed in this blast. Meanwhile a bomb in Grozny, Chechnya, also killed 1 policeman and wounded 14 others. A rebel field commander, Ruslan Bartykhoev, was killed in a special operation in the village of Novy Redant, Ingushetia.
- October 10 - In the forested region near the Ingush town of Ordzhinikidzevskaya, 1 militant was found and killed in an operation by FSB operatives.
- October 11 - An explosion in Kabardino-Balkaria wounded an FSB operative, as he was leaving his home to go to work.
- October 12 - 7 militants and 3 law enforcement officers were killed in a counter-terrorist operation, in Sunzhensky District, Ingushetia. The number of civilian casualties has not yet been disclosed. Intense exchanges of fire were reported throughout the day as authorities continue to battle the insurgents numbering at an estimated 30 fighters.
- October 16 - Clashes in the village of Ordzhonikidzovskaya in Ingushetia have resulted in 4 militants being killed, including that of a woman.
- October 19 - 3 militants were killed in a firefight with police when the officers flagged down their vehicle in Enderey-Aul, Dagestan. In Grozny, Chechnya, 1 policeman and 1 militant were killed in a shootout within the city.
- October 20 - In Nazran, Ingushetia, unidentified militants opened fire at a car driven by a local Police Department employee. The policeman was reportedly injured in this attack.
- October 22 - 4 militants and 1 policeman were killed in a special operation in Grozny, Chechnya. The Four would-be suicide bombers had intended to commit a series of attacks, but were surrounded whilst in a house and killed by security forces.
- October 23 - 1 militant was shot dead by a sniper in Grozny, Chechnya, after trying to assassinate the Chechen president Ramzan Kadyrov along with the Russian State Duma deputy Adam Delimkhanov. The militant drove a car with a 200 kg keg, and intended to detonate the vehicle near to these two men.
- October 25 - An opposition activist from the Ingushetia region of Russia has been shot dead by militants, while in his car in Nalchik, Kabardino-Balkaria.
- October 26 - 2 policemen were killed in a hostile attack in the Naursky District, Chechnya, after checking the documents of bus passengers. The perpetrators managed to flee from the area. Unknown gunmen opened fire upon the Ingush opposition leader Maksharip Aushev's Lada Priora, killing him and badly injuring a woman passenger.
- October 27 - In the Kizilyurt district of Dagestan, unknown militants opened fire on police major Abdurahman Magomedov while he was in his backyard. The police major was killed in this attack.
- October 28 - Dagestani security officials claim they have blocked 3 militants near the village of Durango in the Buinaksk region. Details of the casualties from both sides are still yet to be disclosed.
- October 30 - In Grozny, Chechnya, 1 militant who was suspected of planning to carry out a large-scale terrorist attack was killed in a special forces operation.
- October 31 - In Dagestan, 4 militants were killed after the militants were ordered to reveal documents but they reportedly opened fire. The number of casualties inflicted on the security forces has not yet been disclosed. 3 militants and 1 police officer were killed in a gun battle in the village of Oktyabrskoe, North Ossetia. The taxi driver who had transported the militants there, was wounded in this gunfight.

== November ==
- November 1 - Unidentified militants opened fire on law enforcement officers in the Nazran district of Ingushetia, wounding one officer.
- November 7 - Near the town of Argun in Chechnya, a special operation was conducted by law enforcement officers. In the operation law enforcement officers were successful in killing the so-called emir of the Shali and Kurchaloi districts, Rizvan Osmaeva and his accomplice Ozdamirova Hassan.
- November 10 - Two police officers and one former police officer were injured, whilst taking fire from unknown militants armed with assault rifles. The police were reportedly on patrol in the town of Karachayevsk when they came under fire.
- November 11 - 5 militants were killed and many more injured in a gunfight with security forces, whilst in the Shali district of Chechnya. No security personal losses were reported in the ensuing gunfight with the militants.
- November 13 - A bomb exploded on the train track route Baku-Moscow in Dagestan. No casualties were reported in the blast. 3 militants were killed in Ingushetia after resisting arrest and putting up armed resistance, to which then they were killed in the return fire from police. A major operation in Chechnya involving a helicopter missile strike, has killed more than 20 militants, among the dead militants may be their leader Doku Umarov.
- November 14 - In Ingushetia, five unguided rockets were fired at the Nazran city police department. It was reported that two people were injured.
- November 15 - Unidentified militants opened fire with automatic weapons and rocket-propelled grenades on a military post staffed by interior ministry troops, in Ingushetia. No casualties were reported from this incident however.
- November 16 - 1 militant in Makhachkala, Dagestan committed suicide after negotiations broke down in an apartment building after being surrounded by law enforcement officers.
- November 18 - Two unknown men abducted the son of the head of the Dagestani city of Buinaksk, who is known as Hussein Gamzatova. The two men reportedly forced him into their car from a construction site. They then proceeded to drive him away to an unknown destination.
- November 19 - In the Kizilyurt district of Dagestan, militants attacked the local Mullah, Ibrahim Abakarov, whilst he was in his courtyard has left him seriously wounded.
- November 22 - 1 militant was killed in Dagestan after trying to lay an explosive device on the road. The gunman, apparently after being discovered by police reportedly opened fire on them. However the gunman was killed in the return-fire from police.
- November 23 - Unknown gunmen shot a member of the Federal service, over control for drug trafficking, Rosa Almazova, has been shot dead in the capital of Chechnya, Grozny.
- November 24 - 2 law enforcement officers were killed and beheaded by militants in Kabardino-Balkaria. The bodies were supposedly discovered on Quay street, in the trunk of a car.
- November 25 - In the Kayakentsko district of Dagestan an improvised explosive device was discovered on the tube gas pipeline Mozdok-Gazimagomed.
- November 26 - In Makhachkala, Dagestan, a senior police officer of a special police unit, was attacked and killed by militants. One of the militants is known to have been wounded from this incident, by return fire from the police officer. In Dagestan, a bomb exploded near the station of Tarki on the North-Caucasian railway, located south of Makhachkala. The blast caused no casualties.
- November 27 - In the center of Nalchik, Kabardino-Balkaria, a skirmish occurred, which killed 1 lieutenant, as well as also wounding another policeman and another soldier. In Makhachkala the acting chief of the criminal investigation department for the city was ambushed and shot by unknown militants. He was wounded in this attack. In Ingushetia, an armoured UAZ was blown up by an explosive device in a village. A police chief Karabulak Adyl-Kirima Tsechoev was critically injured in this attack and a local taxi driver who was passing nearby at the time of the blast was also wounded.
- November 28 - Militants from the North Caucasus are strong suspects for a terrorist incident which occurred on the Nevsky express, high speed train. In this derailment it is known that at least 28 people were killed and around 100 others were reportedly injured.
- November 30 - In Makhachkala, Dagestan, the head of the administration for a district in Dagestan, Magaramkentskogo Abrek Hajiyev, was shot dead by unknown militants. His driver who was nearby was also wounded in the attack. In Ingushetia, an accident involving three vehicles claimed the lives of 2 soldiers and wounded another two other soldiers.

== December ==
- December 1 - A militant attack on police officers occurred within the village of Komsomolskoye in the Kizilyurt district of Dagestan. In this attack it is known that 1 militant was killed and that 2 others were detained. No police losses were sustained, although two policemen were injured in the incident.
- December 2 - A convoy of military troops in Ingushetia was ambushed on the federal highway, Kavkaz near the village of Gazi-Yurt, Nazran. This militant ambush apparently wounded 3 soldiers.
- December 3 - In the Levashinskom district of Dagestan, two policemen were killed by unidentified militants. A suspect was later arrested by police after the area was extensively searched.
- December 4 - A bomb explosion in Khasavyurt, Dagestan has killed one soldier and wounded 3 others. All the dead and wounded soldiers belonged to the OMON police unit. In the Malgobek region of Ingushetia, the deputy head for the rescue services in the region, Ahmed Bokov, was shot dead by unidentified militants.
- December 6 - Two employees for the State Drug Control were injured when their vehicle was fired upon by unidentified militants within the Nazran district of Ingushetia.
- December 8 - In Makhachkala, Dagestan, one militant was killed by police and security officers in a shoot-out. No casualties were reported amongst the law enforcements in this particular gunfight.
- December 9 - In the village of Shamhal-Termen, Dagestan, 2 militants, one of them female, were killed when they tried to break through an FSB cordon around the house they were blocked off within. In the town of Ust-Dzheguta, police and security forces killed 3 militants, who were suspected of carrying out attacks upon police in the town of Karachaevsk. One policeman was injured in the shoot-out between the militants in this engagement.
- December 10 - In Ingushetia on the outskirts of Nazran, militants fired a rocket-propelled grenade at a military vehicle. No casualties were sustained by the soldiers or the local residents within the area. In Dagestan, within the village of Talgen, 2 militants were killed by law enforcement officers after failing to stop their vehicle and opening fire upon law enforcement officers.
- December 13 - In a municipal district of Nazran, Ingushetia, unidentified militants opened fire with a grenade launcher upon detectives. One detective was apparently injured in this attack. Reportedly a few hours earlier on the federal highway, located on the outskirts of Nazran, militants opened fire on a police car. This incident left two policemen injured, both in a serious condition. A powerful explosive device and several booby-traps, were found on a pipe in the Malgobek region of Ingushetia. The gas supply was later cut for a few hours at several gas pipelines as a precaution.
- December 15 - In Makhachkala, Dagestan, an improvised explosive device detonated on the path of a police patrol vehicle. The explosion caused no casualties and only minor damage was inflicted upon the vehicle.
- December 16 - Police in Ingushetia fired upon a suspicious vehicle, on the street of Mutalieva in Nazran. It was reported that two militants were killed in this incident and that two others were apparently injured when the vehicle later exploded. In the Kizilyurt district of Dagestan, 3 militants were killed by security forces after they opened fire upon police officer who had been demanding documents.
- December 17 - On the federal highway in Nazran, Ingushetia, at a DPS (highway patrol) post, a suicide bomber detonated his a bomb whilst in a vehicle. The bombing has injured at least 23 people and some of the victims are known to be in a serious condition. In the Stavropol territory, the chairman of a district court received multiple injuries in a grenade attack, he was later admitted to hospital. In Nazran, Ingushetia near the city hospital, unknown militants opened fire killing 2 FSB officers in the local area.
- December 18 - A special operation in the Dargo Vedeno region of Chechnya, has resulted in the deaths of 3 militants, including a notorious militant leader, known as Aslan Izrailov. It is known that many other militants were wounded from this skirmish. During this raid it was also reported that 1 police officer was killed, and another officer was apparently injured.
- December 20 - In Sunzhensky District of Ingushetia, at a hospital, an improvised explosive device was discovered. Patients and staff were reportedly evacuated from the building and bomb handlers later arrived at the scene. In Dagestan, unidentified militants opened fire in the village of Gurbuki, around midnight, killing the chief of the village police department, Abdul Magomedov.
- December 26 - In the village of Ordzhonikidzevskaya, Ingushetia, an explosion occurred near a patrol car. The blast reportedly injured one policeman. Militants based in the North Caucasus have claimed responsibility for the murder last month of a Russian Orthodox priest in Moscow. The perpetrator who had carried out this attack against the priest had reportedly sworn loyalty to Doku Umarov, the self-proclaimed leader of the Caucasus Emirate.
- December 28 - In Makhachkala, Dagestan, an unidentified explosive device detonated near two police cars. It damaged one of the cars, however it caused no injuries.
- December 29 - In Makhachkala, Dagestan, an explosive device detonated near a police patrol vehicle. This blast apparently injured one policeman.
- December 30 - A young student from Ingushetia was abducted by unknown militants on the Novokuznetsk-Kislovodsk train. The student was reportedly returning from Samara when he was detained and was led away by the perpetrators.
- December 31 - It is known that 3 policemen were injured when unidentified militants opened fire with automatic weapons on them whilst they were in a car, in the Yandare district of Nazran, Ingushetia. In Dagestan an operation carried out by FSB officers and the Interior ministry of Dagestan resulted in the deaths of 4 militants.

== See also ==
- List of clashes in the North Caucasus in 2010
- List of clashes in the North Caucasus in 2011
- List of clashes in the North Caucasus in 2012
- List of clashes in the North Caucasus in 2014
- List of clashes in the North Caucasus in 2015
- List of clashes in the North Caucasus in 2016
- List of clashes in the North Caucasus in 2017
- List of clashes in the North Caucasus in 2018
- List of clashes in the North Caucasus in 2019
