= List of clashes in the North Caucasus in 2012 =

== January ==
- January 8 - Two militants and two soldiers were killed and another five soldiers were wounded in clashes in Chechnya.
- January 9 - Four soldiers and four militants have been killed and sixteen servicemen were wounded in a shootout in Chechnya.
- January 13 - Two policemen wounded in Dagestan.
- January 27 - Three militants killed in Ingushetia

== February ==
- February 11 - Four militants and one security forces member killed and another security forces member wounded in Dagestan.
- February 15 - Four servicemen have been killed in a shootout with militants in Chechnya.
- February 27 - The bodies of five hunters were discovered in a forest in Dagestan

== March ==
- March 2 - Two militants killed in Dagestan and a police officer and a passer-by were killed in Makhachkala.
- March 3 - Two militants killed in Ingushetia
- March 4 - Three policemen and a gunman died during an attack on a polling station in Dagestan on Sunday.
- March 6 - A suicide bomber in Dagestan detonated a bomb near a police station killing at least four police officers.
- March 12 - Six militants were killed in Kabardino-Balkaria.
- March 16 - Three militants killed by police in Kabardino-Balkaria
- March 18 - One security officer was killed and another two injured and two militants killed in Dagestan.
- March 30 - One policeman was killed and another injured when unidentified assailants opened fire on a police guard detail in Makhachkala, the capital of Dagestan, a woman passerby was also killed and a man injured and taken to hospital.
- March 30 - An FSB officer died in hospital on Friday after being injured when a bomb went off in his car in Nazran, the capital of Ingushetia.
- March 30 - A member of the security services and his wife were hospitalized after a bomb went off in a car in Nazran, the capital of Ingushetia.

== April ==
- April 5 - Four police officers were injured on Thursday in a roadside bomb detonated in the city of Malgobek in Ingushetia.
- April 8 - A suspected militant was killed in a security operation in Dagestan.
- April 19 - Three suspected militants were killed in Dagestan.
- April 23 - At least 11 militants killed in Dagestan, Chechnya
- April 25 - Three militants were killed on Tuesday night in Khasavyurt, a city in Dagestan.
- April 28 - Two policemen were killed and one injured when a police car was blown up on Saturday just outside the town of Malgobek in Ingushetia.

== May ==
- May 3 - 2012 Makhachkala attack
- May 6 - A new blast hit the capital of Dagestan on Sunday, injuring one person.
- May 11 - Three Islamist insurgents, including a man tasked with delivering judgment according to sharia law, were killed by law enforcement officers in Kizlyar forest in Dagestan on Friday.
- May 12 - Six insurgents killed in Dagestan.
- May 14 - Militant leader killed in Dagestan.
- May 20 - Police killed two suspected militants in a security operation in Dagestan.
- May 24 - Soldier killed by explosive device in Ingushetia.
- May 30 - Dagestan deputy sports minister Nasyr Gadzhikhanov was killed when his car was attacked by gunmen in Makhachkala.

== June ==
- June 1 - A traffic police officer was killed in Dagestan on Friday
- June 1 - Two law enforcement officers were killed in Kabardino-Balkaria on Friday.
- June 8 - Six militants killed in Dagestan.
- June 10 - Three militants have been killed in Kabardino-Balkaria.
- June 10 - Five police officers and a 19-year-old civilian were injured late on Saturday by a grenade blast in Ingushetia.
- June 16 - Two militants suspected of planning assassination of Chechen leader Ramzan Kadyrov were killed on Friday night in Grozny.
- June 21 - Four security officers were injured when unknown gunmen attacked their car in Dagestan.
- June 27 - Two militant warlords and a policeman was killed and two others wounded in Dagestan.

== July ==
- July 1 - Unknown gunmen shot dead a police officer in Dagestan.
- July 3 - A militant leader was killed on Tuesday in Kabardino-Balkaria.
- July 14 - Seven gunmen and a member of the security forces died in an anti-terrorist operation in Dagestan on Saturday.
- July 21 - Unidentified assailants on Saturday opened fire against a military convoy in Ingushetia, killing at least two servicemen.
- July 27 - Six militants and a female suicide bomber were killed on Friday in Dagestan in a firefight with security forces.
- July 28 - Two police officers were injured on Saturday when a roadside bomb exploded near their vehicle in Ingushetia.
- July 28 - A police patrolman was shot dead late on Friday in a remote village in Dagestan.

== August ==
- August 1 - Two police officers were injured on Wednesday afternoon in a bomb blast in Derbent, Dagestan.
- August 5 - One militant killed and police officer was killed and another one was injured during an anti-militant raid in the capital of Dagestan.
- August 6 - Two police officers were killed and one injured when their car came under fire in Dagestan.
- August 6 - Four people were confirmed dead and three others injured in an apparent suicide blast on August 6 in the Chechen capital of Grozny.
- August 9 - At least five police officers and three militants were killed on Thursday in a shootout in Dagestant.
- August 14 - Two traffic police were killed in a shooting in Dagestan on Tuesday.
- August 18 - Eight people were injured during an attack on believers in a Dagestani mosque on the eve of the Muslim holiday of Eid ul-Fitr, medics said on Saturday.
- August 19 - At least 7 or eight people were killed and 15 injured after a suicide bomber blew himself up at a policeman funeral in Ingushetia.
- August 24 - A serviceman was killed and another injured in an attack on a military convoy in Dagestan on Friday.
- August 25 - Two militants have been killed by Russian security forces in Dagestan.
- August 28 - A serviceman in the Dagestan settlement of Belidzhi on Tuesday went on shooting spree and killed seven of his fellow soldiers.
- August 28 - A spiritual leader of Dagestan Muslims, Sheikh Said Afandi, and five other people were killed in a blast carried out by a female suicide bomber in the Dagestan settlement of Chirkey.
- August 28 - Three militants have been killed and several have been detained on Tuesday in a large-scale security operation in the town of Malgobek in Ingushetia.

== September ==
- September 2 - Two alleged Islamist insurgents attacked police during a document check in Dagestan on Sunday, but were killed by return fire.
- September 5 - Six police officers were killed and several more were injured when a group of unidentified assailants fired on a motor convoy in Ingushetia on Wednesday.
- September 6 - One police officer was killed when a bomb planted under his car detonated on Thursday in the Chechen capital of Grozny.
- September 13 - One police officer was killed and two others were injured in an attack in Dagestan on Thursday.
- September 15 - Five Islamic insurgents and one police officer were killed in Dagestan in a skirmish with security forces on Saturday.
- September 19 - Five militants were killed late on Tuesday during a counter-terrorism operation in Ingushetia.
- September 20 - At least four militants and two police officers were killed on Thursday during a special police operation in Chechnya, Chechen leader Ramzan Kadyrov said.

== October ==
- October 16 - Two gunmen shelling military patrol killed in Dagestan.
- October 18 - Traffic police officer shot dead in Magas, Ingushetia.

== See also ==
- List of clashes in the North Caucasus in 2009
- List of clashes in the North Caucasus in 2010
- List of clashes in the North Caucasus in 2011
- List of clashes in the North Caucasus in 2014
- List of clashes in the North Caucasus in 2015
- List of clashes in the North Caucasus in 2016
- List of clashes in the North Caucasus in 2017
- List of clashes in the North Caucasus in 2018
- List of clashes in the North Caucasus in 2019
