= List of clashes in the North Caucasus in 2011 =

== January ==
- January 1 - In the republic of Dagestan, it was reported that unidentified militants killed 1 police officer, after they reportedly shot dead an acting chief of a criminal investigation department for the republic. The police official apparently later died from his injuries that he had sustained in this militant attack.
- January 2 - In Grozny, Chechnya, it was reported that unidentified militants opened fire with automatic weapons upon a convoy of Russian interior ministry troops. It was later known that at least 2 Russian soldiers were injured in this militant attack, which had occurred within the republic's capital city.
- January 4 - In Makhachkala, Dagestan, it was reported that at least 2 militants were killed in a special operation, which was conducted by Russian security forces on the outskirts of the republic's capital city. No security forces personnel casualties were specified by the local authorities. In Vladikavkaz, North Ossetia, an IED detonated under the vehicle for the deputy chief of staff for a military unit stationed in the city of Nazran, which is located in the neighbouring republic of Ingushetia. The police official was apparently seriously injured in this militant bombing. In Nalchik, Kabardino-Balkaria, it was reported that unidentified militants detonated an IED at an entertainment club within the republic's capital city. No casualties were sustained in this militant bombing, although moderate damage was caused upon the surrounding areas. In Makhachkala, Dagestan, it was reported that at least 1 police officer and 1 militant were killed in a shootout between the two forces, after a forced document check within the republic's capital city. The police officer reportedly later died at hospital due to the injuries that he had sustained in this militant attack.
- January 5 - In Khasavyurt, Dagestan, it was reported that at least 4 militants were killed in a special operation, which was conducted by Russian special forces upon a blocked building, as the militants defied offers for them to surrender to law enforcement officers. No details concerning security forces personnel casualties were specified by the local authorities. In Makhachkala, Dagestan, it was reported that 2 militants were reportedly detained, as a result of the previous document-clash incident, which had occurred earlier within the republic's capital city.
- January 6 - In Makhachkala, Dagestan, it was reported that 1 police officer was injured and 4 militants detained, after security forces arrested suspects of whom they had claimed that they'd previously assaulted and kidnapped a police officer within the republic's capital city.
- January 9 - In the village of Ordzhonikidzevskaya, Ingushetia, it was reported that sappers of the interior ministry for the republic had apparently defused a bomb, which had been positioned close to a local hospital within the area. In Grozny, Chechnya, it was reported that a shootout between security forces and militants killed at least 1 Russian soldier and 1 militant within the republic's capital city. It is also known that at least 8 other people, including some 6 Russian soldiers, 1 police officer and a civilian were also apparently injured, as a result of this militant clash that occurred on the south-eastern outskirts of the city.
- January 10 - In Makhachkala, Dagestan, it was reported that a powerful home-made bomb of 2 kg TNT equivalent was defused at a residential home, of a five-storey building, which was located within the republic's capital city.
- January 11 - In Makhachkala, Dagestan, it was reported that unidentified militants opened fire with automatic weapons and then set fire to a drinking bar within the republic's capital city. It is known that 1 civilian was apparently injured, as a result of this militant attack.
- January 12 - In Grozny, Chechnya, it was reported that unidentified militants attempted an assassination attempt upon a colonel of an ex-battalion for the Spetsnaz GRU units. The attackers apparently brought down heavy automatic weapon fire upon his vehicle, killing his police official driver and injuring him seriously. It was also reported that 2 civilians and 1 militant were also reportedly killed in the cross-fire and return-fire, as a result of this militant attack.
- January 14 - In Makhachkala, Dagestan, it was reported that at least 3 militants, including a female accomplice were killed in a special operation conducted by Russian security forces within the republic's capital city. No security forces casualties were specified by the local authorities. In Khasavyurt, Dagestan, it was reported that at least 4 civilians were killed and 8 others injured, in a car bomb explosion, as the blast ripped into a cafe within this particular city of the republic. It was later specified by the authorities that five of those injured were known to be in a critical condition, whereas the other three were assessed as being seriously injured, according to local preliminary information at the scene of this militant bombing.
- January 16 - In the village of Yaryk-su, in the Novolaksky district of the southern Russian republic of Dagestan, it was reported that security forces discovered a militant arms cache near a local cemetery, which is located within the west of the republic.
- January 17 - In the Shatoi region of Chechnya, it was reported that 1 Russian soldier was killed and another injured, after security forces attempted to defuse a bomb, which was discovered in a mountain woodland near the settlement of Kharsevoi within the republic.
- January 20 - In Khasavyurt, Dagestan, it was reported that unidentified militants detonated a bomb near to the entrance of a supermarket within this particular city of the republic. Nobody was reportedly injured or killed, although the shop building was severely damaged as a result of this militant bombing.
- January 21 - In the republic of Dagestan, it was reported that at least 3 militants, including a local terrorist group leader, were killed in a shootout after unidentified militants in a vehicle opened fire upon Russian security forces and were subsequently killed in the return fire. No law enforcement casualties were reportedly specified, as a result of this militant clash with security forces by the local authorities.
- January 23 - In the village of Ordzhonikidzevskaya, Ingushetia, it was reported that a bomb explosion occurred in a market within the centre of the village. The area was later cordoned off, as police specialists discovered and defused two other bombs within the local area. Nobody was reportedly injured or killed, as a result of this militant bombing.
- January 24 - A suicide bombing occurred at the baggage reclaim area of the international arrivals hall of the Domodedovo International Airport, which is located in southern Moscow. The suicide attack reportedly killed at least 35 people and injured more than 130 others, with 20 reportedly in a critical condition at local hospitals. No group immediately claimed responsibility for this latest suicide attack, although suspicion will fall on the Caucasus Emirate from the North Caucasus. The Russian President, Dmitry Medvedev, ordered increased security across the capital, especially at its airports and other transport hubs and also was known to have called an emergency meeting with top officials. He later vowed that those behind the perpetration of this attack would be tracked down and punished by Russian security forces.
- January 26 - In Khasavyurt, Dagestan, it was reported that at least 4 civilians were killed and 6 others injured, after a car bomb explosion ripped through a cafe in this particular city of the republic. It was initially reported that 3 civilians were killed and 7 others injured, however one person later succumbed to their injuries at a local hospital. This car bombing acts as the second such attack to strike the city, with a previous car bombing earlier in the month, striking another cafe within the same city of the republic.
- January 27 - In the village of Luxemburg within the Babayurtovskogo district of the republic of Dagestan, it was reported that unidentified militants opened fire upon the Acting Head of ATS and his deputy within this village of the republic. It was later known that the Acting Head of the ATS, his deputy assistant and a militant perpetrator were all allegedly killed as a result of this militant attack. In Khasavyurt, Dagestan, it was reported that 2 militants, including the so-called Deputy Emir of Dagestan for the Caucasus Emirate, and his resisting wife were killed in a special operation within this particular city of the republic. No security forces personnel casualties were reportedly sustained whilst conducting this special operation.
- January 28 - In Nalchik, Kabardino-Balkaria, it was reported that the Chegem district administration head, Mikhail Mambetov, for the republic's capital city was killed in a suspected militant attack. This was later confirmed by a source at the republican investigative department for the republic.
- January 30 - In Izberbash, Dagestan, it was reported that Russian security forces foiled a potentially serious terrorist attack, after two land mines were discovered in a private residential sector of the town. It is known that sappers have already defused the first bomb, however the second has yet to be defused by specialists at the scene of this averted militant attack.
- January 31 - In the stretch of Timergo Shamhal, Dagestan, it was reported that a bomb derailed a freight train and its locomotive on this stretch of rail line within the republic. Nobody was reportedly killed or injured in this militant attack, although delays were caused on other train lines operating on this rail line of the republic. In Nazran, Ingushetia, it was reported that unidentified militants killed the head of the central administrative district, Alehan Saro, as he was driving his car in a market area of the republic's capital city. The head of local administration was apparently severely injured after unidentified assailants opened fire upon his car, however he later succumbed to his injuries that were sustained in this militant attack.

== February ==
- February 1 - In Makhachkala, Dagestan, it was reported that 2 militants were killed, including the head of the Kizilyurt sabotage and terrorist group, in a special operation conducted hy Russian security forces within the republic. No police forces casualties were reportedly specified as a result of this special operation. In Kizlyar, Dagestan, it was reported that a bomb explosion injured 4 people, after the bomb detonated inside a food stop on the first floor of a house within this particular town of the republic. It is known that all those injured, were apparently members of a family residing inside the household, which was targeted in this militant attack.
- February 2 - In Chegem, Kabardino-Balkaria, it was reported that 5 police officers were killed and 1 other injured as a result of two militant attacks within this particular major town of the republic. The first attack involved a drive-by shooting, in which 1 police officer was killed. Whereas the second assault occurred as unidentified militants stormed into a cafe, where police officers were stationed, and reportedly shot them dead execution style. It is known that 4 police officers were killed and 1 other was injured, as a result of this second militant attack. In Moscow, Russia, it was reported that the death toll in the 2011 Domodedovo International Airport bombing, had reportedly risen to at least 36 people killed and with more than 130 others injured. This latest amendment to the death toll came, as one critically injured person, reportedly succumbed to their injuries at a local hospital, as a result of this militant suicide bombing.
- February 3 - In Makhachkala, Dagestan, it was reported that the deputy chief of the architecture department was killed in a bomb explosion in the republic's capital city. It is known that the deputy chief, Magomed Izudinov, had apparently been severely injured as a result of a parcel bomb explosion, however he later died of his injuries that were sustained in this militant bombing. In the region of Zolskom, of the republic of Kabardino-Balkaria, it was reported that 2 police officers were seriously injured, after unidentified militants opened fire upon them in an identity check within this particular region of the republic. It is known that the perpetrators apparently managed to escape from the area, which had surrounded this militant attack.
- February 4 - In Sadovy, Karachay–Cherkessia, it was reported that 3 police officers were killed, after unidentified militants opened fire upon a vehicle carrying a prisoner within this particular settlement of the republic. It is known that the unidentified assailants apparently freed the prisoner and then fled from the scene of this militant attack. In Kizlyar, Dagestan, it was reported that a bomb explosion occurred under a cargo train, however it failed to derail the train and its locomotive. No casualties were reportedly sustained as a result of this militant bombing.
- February 5 - In Izberbash, Dagestan, it was reported that 2 police officers were injured, after a shootout occurred with unidentified militants, as their vehicle was stopped for a document-check in this particular town of the republic. The perpetrators reportedly managed to flee from the scene, as an investigation is under way into this militant attack.
- February 7 - In Makhachkala, Dagestan, it was reported that two large bombs were defused by police specialists in the republic's capital city. The explosive devices were later rendered harmless with the use of a robotic machine and sappers specialists who defused the explosive devices at the scene of this averted militant attack.
- February 8 - In Makhachkala, Dagestan, it was reported that 3 police officers were injured, after a bomb detonated near to a police vehicle, which was based near the city police station in the republic's capital city. The authorities are currently searching for the perpetrators behind this militant bombing.
- February 9 - In Grozny, Chechnya, it was reported that two bomb explosions occurred in the Leninsky district, of the republic's capital city. It was later known that 5 people, including 4 police officers and 1 civilian were injured, as a result of these militant bombings.
- February 10 - In Grozny, Chechnya, it was reported that a bomb explosion occurred at a bus stop near a busy intersection in the centre of the republic's capital city. It was later confirmed that 1 civilian was injured, as a result of this militant bombing. In Nazran, Ingushetia, it was reported that Russian security forces detained 3 militants, allegedly involved in the Domodedovo International Airport bombing in Moscow, of the later period of last month. The three potential terrorist suspects were reportedly transferred in custody, to an interrogation centre in Vladikavkaz, North Ossetia, for further questioning over this particular terrorist attack. In Makhachkala, Dagestan, it was reported that Russian security forces detained 2 militants, who are allegedly citizens of Kazakhstan. The two assailants had apparently surrendered to the authorities, after hours of negotiation, as the militants were blocked off inside an apartment building within the republic's capital city. In Magas, Ingushetia, it was reported that Russian security forces detained 1 other militant who had allegedly been behind the Domodedovo International Airport bombing in Moscow of late last month. The detainment of another suspected militant was later confirmed by an anonymous source in the law enforcement agency for the republic.
- February 11 - In Makhachkala, Dagestan, it was reported that Russian security forces defused a bomb attached to a vehicle near a mosque in the republic's capital city. It is known that the explosive device had apparently been attached to the vehicle of a parishioner to this local mosque, however it was later rendered harmless by sappers at the scene of this averted militant bombing.
- February 12 - In Kizilyurt, Dagestan, it was reported that 1 militant was killed, after he apparently mishandled a bomb in the village of Sultan Yangiyurt, which is located within this particular region of the republic. The dead militant had apparently triggered the explosion prematurely whilst in a cemetery, and died at the scene of this militant bombing. In Nazran, Ingushetia, it was reported that 2 militants were killed in a shootout with Russian security forces in the centre of the republic's capital city. The shootout was apparently initiated after the militants refused to stop their vehicle, after demands from the security forces, which then triggered this military skirmish.
- February 14 - In the village of Gubden, Dagestan, it was reported that 3 police officers were killed and more than 25 others injured, after twin suicide bombers, including a female, targeted a security checkpoint within this particular village of the republic. It is known that an investigation is currently under-way into these twin militant suicide bombings.
- February 15 - In Karachay–Cherkessia, of the Stavropol region of southern Russia, it was reported that 3 police officers and 5 militants were killed in a military clash within this particular district of the region. It is also known that 3 other police officers were injured as a result of this military clash, as a search operation was initiated in the area to search for other militants at the scene of these militant clashes. In Karachay–Cherkessia, of the Stavropol region, it was reported that a Mi-28 helicopter apparently dispatched to the scene of these militant clashes crashed in the surrounding areas. It was later known that the commander of the helicopter was apparently killed in this crash, which was blamed on a mechanical fault, whereas another was reportedly hospitalised. In Grozny, Chechnya, it was reported that 2 militants were killed, after they opened fire and detonated their explosive-belts after being surrounded by Russian security forces. It is known that Russian security forces later discovered explosive material at the scene of these militant bombings.
- February 17 - In Kizlyar, Dagestan, it was reported that two bomb explosions occurred inside a local shop within this particular city of the republic. It was later known that 1 security guard was apparently injured and the shop seriously damaged as a result of these two militant bombings.
- February 18 - In Baksan, Kabardino-Balkaria, it was reported that 4 civilians were killed and 1 other was injured, after unidentified militants opened fire upon a vehicle carrying five tourists from Moscow. It was initially reported that 3 people were killed and 2 others injured, as a result of this militant shooting, however an injured person later succumbed to their injuries at a local hospital. The perpetrators apparently managed to flee in a vehicle from the scene of this militant attack.
- February 19 - On Mount Elbrus, Kabardino-Balkaria, it was reported that a bomb explosion struck a skiing cable-way, damaging some 30 out of the 45 cable-cars between the two stations. It was later specified however that no reported casualties were confirmed, as a result of this militant bombing. The cable-way station has apparently been closed, as security specialists are currently searching and investigating the scene of this militant bombing. In Nalchik, Kabardino-Balkaria, it was reported that unidentified militants killed the head of administration, Ramzan Friev, who served for the village of Hasanya. It is known that this particular village, in which he worked, acts as a residential neighbourhood for the republic's capital city. In Nalchik, Kabardino-Balkaria, it was reported that 1 police officer was killed and another injured, after unidentified militants opened fire upon their police patrol in the centre of the republic's capital city. This militant attack was later confirmed by a source from the law enforcement agencies for this particular republic.
- February 20 - At the foot of Mount Cheget, Kabardino-Balkaria, it was reported that Russian security forces defused a huge car bomb, which contained three explosive devices, which were equivalent to 70 kg of TNT within the interior of the vehicle. It is known that tourists in nearby hotels were evacuated for safety reasons, as police specialists later defused the car bomb, at the scene of this averted militant car bombing. In Khasavyurt, Dagestan, it was reported that 2 civilians were killed and a young girl seriously injured, after unidentified militants opened fire upon fortune tellers in the village of Novo-Sasitli, which is located in this particular republic. It is known that Russian security forces apparently seized weapons cartridges and evidence at the scene of this militant attack. In Khasavyurt, Dagestan, it was reported that 1 militant was killed in a special operation within this particular major town of the republic. It is known that the militant leader was responsible for several terrorist attacks in the surrounding regions of this republic. In Nalchik, Ingushetia 1 police officer was killed and 1 injured after their police car got ambushed.
- February 22 - In Elbrus, Kabardino-Balkaria, it was reported that 5 militants and 1 civilian were killed, as a result of militant clashes between militants and Russian security forces within this particular region of the republic. It was also known that 1 Russian soldier was killed and another 6 others injured as a result of these militant skirmishes. Also 5-7 militants have attacked a checkpoint of Russian internal troops.
- February 23 - In Baksan, Kabardino-Balkaria, it was reported that 1 police officer was injured, after unidentified militants in a vehicle opened fire upon the officer who was returning home from his local police office. It is known that the police officer was later hospitalised for his injuries that were sustained in this militant attack.
- February 24 - In Moscow, Russia, it is known that another person succumbed to their injuries in hospital, as a result of the Domodedovo International Airport bombing. Therefore raising the death toll to at least 37 killed and with more than 180 others injured. This suicide bombing was later taken responsibility for by Doku Umarov, the self-proclaimed leader of the Caucasus Emirate of the North Caucasus region. In Elbrus, Kabardino-Balkaria, it was reported that Russian security forces discovered a militant camp, used by some 8 militants, within this particular district of the republic. It is known that Russian security forces seized various weapons and items, including uniforms, weapons and explosives at the scene of this militant camp-site. According to the police sources in Kabardino-Balkaria the group of militants, which was chased by Russian security forces in the Elbrus region has escaped. The reports about any casualties within this group on 22 January could not be confirmed. Russian security forces suppose at least 2 militants were injured.
- February 25 - In the Achkhoy-Martan district of Chechnya, it was reported that 3 militants were killed, after Russian security forces conducted a special operation within this particular district of the republic. It is known that the militants were destroyed after they refused to surrender to security forces whilst surrounded and reportedly opened fire, however they were killed in the retaliatory fire from the security forces and consequently died in this militant skirmish. In Nalchik, Kabardino-Balkaria, it was reported that several groups up to a dozen militants attacked various security and civilian targets across the republic's capital city. It was later known that at least 12 police officers and civilians were allegedly injured, as a result of these simultaneous militant attacks. Several police check points and an FSB hospital were among the targets. In the city of Sochi, which is located in southern Russia, it was reported that a bomb was discovered on a main gas pipeline in this particular city of the country. It is known that the explosive device was apparently successfully defused, although such repeated attacks only seek to compromise security for the upcoming 2014 Winter Olympics, which is to be held in the southern Russian city of Sochi, which is located in southern Russia.
- February 26 - In the Achkhoy-Martan district of Chechnya, it was reported that 3 militants were killed, as a result of a special operation conducted by Russian security forces against their house, which the militants had blocked themselves within. No security forces casualties were specified by the authorities and special forces claimed to have seized weapons and ammunition at the scene of this militant skirmish.
- February 27 - In Makhachkala, Dagestan, it was reported that 5 militants were detained by Russian security forces, as a result of special operations across the republic. It is known that several of those detained were believed to have carried out attacks and assaults on local security forces and police officials across the republic.
- February 28 - In Chegem, Kabardino-Balkaria, it was reported that 1 militant was killed, after a shootout occurred with local security forces, as they opened fire upon their police patrol vehicle. It is known that one militant apparently escaped from the scene of this militant attack, took a hostage briefly inside a car and then just disappeared. It is believed that local security forces also seized weaponry and ammunition from the scene, whilst claiming that they had apparently suffered no casualties or losses as a result of these militant skirmishes.

== March ==
- March 1 - In Nalchik, Kabardino-Balkaria, an anti-terrorist operation's leader warned about the prospect of a potential civil war in the republic. As it is known that he claimed militants were exploiting civilians by preying upon their anger and resentment towards the local authorities. It was finally detailed that the anti-terrorist group leader warned that brutal crackdowns would be directed towards militant families and anyone associated with terrorist groups in the republic. In Elbrus, Kabardino-Balkaria, it was reported that Russian security forces have identified those responsible for the terrorist attack on tourists travelling from Moscow, in which four people were killed and others seriously injured. It is known that a Russian security forces operation is currently under-way to detain or eliminate the perpetrators of this militant attack.
- March 2 - In the republic of Ingushetia, it is known that 3 suspected militants were detained and charged with involvement in the Domodedovo International Airport bombing in Moscow. It is known that relatives of the suspected suicide bomber were among those detained, with a brother and sister being detained as relatives of the perpetrator of this suicide attack.
- March 3 - The self-proclaimed leader of the Caucasus Emirate, Doku Umarov, called in a video message for all Russian Muslims to launch Jihad or a Holy War against the nation state of Russia. He also was known to proclaim that the Domodedovo International Airport bombing was conducted as a special operation under his own personal command and promised such attacks in the near future would continue within the Russian heartland.
- March 4 - In Makhachkala, Dagestan, it was reported that 1 police officer was killed, after unidentified militants opened fire upon his vehicle within the republic's capital city. It is known that an investigation team is currently working at the scene of this militant attack. In Nazran, Ingushetia, it was reported that 1 militant was killed and another injured in a shootout with Russian security forces in the republic's capital city. It is known that 1 police officer was also injured, as a result of this militant skirmish. In Nazran, Ingushetia, it was reported that 1 militant was killed, after he blew himself up with a grenade whilst resisting arrest in the republic's capital city. No other casualties were reportedly specified by the local authorities, as a result of this militant bombing. In Karabulak, Ingushetia, it was reported that a counter-terrorist operation regime was imposed in the area, as a result of information suggesting militants were planning acts of sabotage and terrorist attacks. It is known that traffic is being limited, routine searches are being applied and local residents have been advised to stay calm and vigilant, as a result of this anti-terrorist operation regime.
- March 6 - In Nalchik, Kabardino-Balkaria, it was reported that 1 militant was killed, after he resisted arrest from local authorities and opened fire upon Russian security forces, to which he was then killed in the return-fire. No casualties were reportedly sustained by security forces and it is known that the perpetrator was later identified by local authorities whilst ammunition and weapons were seized at the scene of this militant skirmish. In the southern Russian city of Sochi, it is known that some 6,000 security forces personnel took part in large-scale practice counter-terrorist operations in preparation for the 2014 Winter Olympics. It is known that the Caucasus Emirate desires to launch militant attacks upon the venues of such games in the southern Russian city of Sochi in 2014.
- March 7 - In Nazran, Ingushetia, it was reported that 1 militant was killed, after Russian security forces conducted a special operation on a blocked house within the republic's capital city. No casualties were reportedly sustained by Russian security forces, as a result of these militant skirmishes, which culminated from this special operation within the republic's capital city.
- March 8 - In Nalchik, Kabardino-Balkaria, it was reported that 1 militant was killed, after a failed attack on Russian security forces, in which the grenade he hurled detonated near to the unidentified assailant. No casualties were reportedly sustained by Russian security forces, as a result of this failed militant attack.
- March 28 - In Nazran, Ingushetia, it was reported that at least 17 militants and 3 Russian soldiers were killed, as a result of a special operation conducted by the FSB within the republic. It is known that aviation and ground forces apparently destroyed a militant hide-out, which was allegedly training suicide bombers to carry out attacks for the neighbouring republics of Ingushetia and North Ossetia. The security forces also apparently detained two militants believed to have been involved behind recent terrorist attacks in Moscow

== August ==
- August 30 - At least eight people were killed and 22 injured in three bomb attacks aimed at law enforcement personnel in Grozny, Chechnya.

== September ==
- September 22 - A policeman was killed and over 60 people were injured in a bomb attack in Makhachkala, Dagestan.

== See also ==
- List of clashes in the North Caucasus in 2009
- List of clashes in the North Caucasus in 2010
- List of clashes in the North Caucasus in 2012
- List of clashes in the North Caucasus in 2014
- List of clashes in the North Caucasus in 2015
- List of clashes in the North Caucasus in 2016
- List of clashes in the North Caucasus in 2017
- List of clashes in the North Caucasus in 2018
- List of clashes in the North Caucasus in 2019
