= 2012 Makhachkala attack =

Suicide bombing incident at Dagestan, Russia

- Location of Dagestan in Russia

- Location of Makhachkala in Dagestan
- Location: Makhachkala, Dagestan, Russia
- Date: 3 May 2012
- Weapon: Bomb
- Deaths: 13-40
- Injuries: 100-130
- Perpetrator: Caucasus Emirate

The 2012 Makhachkala attack occurred on 3 May 2012 after two suicide bombers detonated explosive-filled cars near a traffic police checkpoint in Makhachkala, a city and capital in the republic of Dagestan, Russia, killing as many as 40 people. More than 130 others were injured in the blasts, at least 67 of them seriously. Government sources speculated that the bombers may have been transporting TNT to a downtown location in anticipation of the annual May Day parade on May 9.

Authorities at the time put the death toll at 13, but in December 2016, the Federal Security Service put the casualty figures at 40 dead and more than 100 injured. The statement was issued in connection with the death of Rustam Asildarov, who was allegedly involved in the Makhachkala attack.

== See also ==
- List of clashes in the North Caucasus in 2012
- Makhachkala Rus bombing
