= List of clashes in the North Caucasus in 2019 =

This is the list of attacks and conflicts that occurred in 2019 in the course of the Insurgency in the North Caucasus, a low-intensity conflict in Russia's North Caucasian republics.

Date	Location	Deaths	Details
11 January	Karabudakhkentsky District, Dagestan	0 (+3)	Three suspected militants who attacked a patrol post were killed by police.
13 January	Sunzhensky District, Republic of Ingushetia	1	Gunfire on a car of the local head of Ingush Centre for Combating Extremism left one policeman dead.
24 January	Kabardino-Balkaria	0 (+4)	Four assailants were killed and one policeman was injured in an attack on a police post.
19 February	Derbentsky District, Dagestan	0 (+1)	One suspected militant was killed in a reported "counter-terrorism operation".
27 February	Nalchik, Kabardino-Balkaria	0 (+3)	Three militants were reportedly killed in a shootout during counter-terrorism operation in the city of Nalchik.
14 March	Shpakovsky District, Stavropol Krai	0 (+2)	Two alleged Islamic State militants were killed in a shootout with police officers.
26 March	Nazran, Ingushetia	0	Several gunmen injured three people, including the Nazran mayor's son, in shooting at the town hall.
3 April	Kabardino-Balkaria	0 (+2)	Police shot dead two suspected militants who refused order to stop their car and opened fire on police.
24 May	Kizilyurtovsky District, Dagestan	0 (+3)	Security forces killed three suspected militants and find automatic weapons and munitions.
23 June	Grozny, Chechnya	0 (+1)	Security forces killed a Chechen citizen after he stabbed one policeman and shot and wounded another. Islamic State claimed responsibility.
1 July	Achkhoy-Martan, Achkhoy-Martanovsky District, Chechnya	1 (+1)	One Russian personnel and an IS militant were killed during a stabbing attack perpetrated in the municipality Katyr-Yurt, Achkhoy-Martan, in Achkhoy-Martanovsky District. The next day, the Islamic State claimed that a member of the group was responsible for the attack.
9 September	Grozny, Chechnya	0 (+1)	Security forces killed a Chechen citizen after he shot at policemen.

== See also ==
- List of clashes in the North Caucasus in 2009
- List of clashes in the North Caucasus in 2010
- List of clashes in the North Caucasus in 2011
- List of clashes in the North Caucasus in 2012
- List of clashes in the North Caucasus in 2015
- List of clashes in the North Caucasus in 2016
- List of clashes in the North Caucasus in 2017
- List of clashes in the North Caucasus in 2018
