= List of clashes in the North Caucasus in 2015 =

- 1 January - Security forces killed a rebel group leader in Chechnya.
- 28 February - Five members of the Interior Ministry of RF were wounded during explosion of an unknown explosive device in a woods area of the Urus-Martan district of Chechnya and were taken to hospital.
- 22 November - Russian special forces kill 10 ISIS-linked militants in a counter-terrorist operation in a mountainous region near the city of Nalchik in Russia's North Caucasus.
- 29 December - A gunman opened fire on a group of local residents who were visiting a viewing platform at the fortress in Derbent, Dagestan, southern Russia, killing one and injuring 11. ISIS claims responsibility.
- 30 December - Unidentified gunman opened fire on a group of local residents who were visiting a viewing platform at the fortress in Derbent, Dagestan, southern Russia, killing one and injuring 11. The visitors included two border guards, one of whom was killed in the attack. No group claimed responsibility.

== See also ==
- List of clashes in the North Caucasus in 2009
- List of clashes in the North Caucasus in 2011
- List of clashes in the North Caucasus in 2012
- List of clashes in the North Caucasus in 2014
- List of clashes in the North Caucasus in 2016
- List of clashes in the North Caucasus in 2017
- List of clashes in the North Caucasus in 2018
- List of clashes in the North Caucasus in 2019
