= Rustam Asildarov =

Caucasus Emirate and ISIL member

- Рустам Магомедович Асельдеров

Wali of Wilayah al-Qawkaz
- In office 23 June 2015 – 3 December 2016
- Preceded by: Position created

Emir of the Dagestani Front
- In office 8 August 2012 – January 2015
- Preceded by: Ibragimkhalil Daudov
- Succeeded by: Kamil Saidov (Said Kharakansky)

Personal details
- Born: 9 March 1981 Buynaksky District, Kalmyk ASSR, Soviet Union
- Died: 3 December 2016 (aged 35) near Makhachkala, Dagestan, Russia
- Nickname: Emir Abu Muhammad

Military service
- Allegiance: Caucasus Emirate (former); Islamic State
- Commands: Dagestan Front (former); Caucasus Province
- Battles/wars: Insurgency in the North Caucasus

Rustam Asildarov (Aselderov) (9 March 1981 – 3 December 2016), also known as Emir Abu Muhammad Kadarsky, was the leader of the Islamic State (IS) North Caucasus branch, and a former leader of the militant Caucasus Emirate's Vilayat Dagestan wing.

== Biography ==
Asildarov grew up in the Kadar region of the Buynaksky District in Russia's republic of Dagestan. During the late 1990s, the area became a regional center of Salafism and had de facto independence, before military operations in September 1999 brought it back under the control of the Russian state.

Asildarov became the leader of Vilayat Dagestan's Central Sector in May 2010, and on 8 August 2012, Caucasus Emirate's leader, Dokka Umarov, appointed Asildarov as the overall leader of Vilayat Dagestan, following the death of Ibragimkhalil Daudov.

In December 2014, a video clip of Asildarov was posted online, in which he retracted his oath of allegiance to Umarov's successor, Aliaskhab Kebekov, and pledged loyalty to Islamic State leader Abu Bakr al-Baghdadi. Kebekov responded days later with a video, in which he condemned Asildarov's "betrayal" and appointed Kamil Saidov as the new leader of Vilayat Dagestan.

In an audio statement on 23 June 2015, IS's spokesman Abu Mohammad al-Adnani accepted pledges of allegiance to the group made by North Caucasus militants, and announced the creation of a new Wilayat or Province covering the region. Adnani declared the leader of this new branch to be Abu Muhammad al-Qadari, a pseudonym of Asildarov.

On 29 September 2015, the United States Department of State added Asildarov to its list of Specially Designated Global Terrorists.

== Death ==
On 3 December 2016, the FSB announced that Asildarov and four close associates had been killed in an anti-terror raid near Makhachkala, Dagestan.
