= List of clashes in the North Caucasus in 2018 =

Date	Location	Deaths	Details
18 February	Kizlyar	5	Kizlyar church shooting: One man shot dead in a crowd in Kizlyar, killing at least five people. Four others were injured. Later, IS claimed responsibility for this act.
20 March	Grozny	0 (+1)	A man with a firearm attacked and injured a police officer in the Chechen capital Grozny. The assailant was killed.
21 April	Derbent	0 (+9)	Nine suspected militants are killed by Russian security forces in a major counter-terrorism operation in Derbent, Dagestan.
1 May	Neftekumsk	0 (+1)	In the Russian city of Neftekumsk, a man attacked two police officers with a knife. As a result, both law enforcement officers were injured. During the arrest, the man resisted and stabbed one of the policemen, after which a policeman shot him dead.
4 May	Nevinnomyssk	0 (+2)	Two Islamist rebels were killed during an encounter against officers of the FSB in the city of Nevinnomyssk, Stavropol Krai.
19 May	Grozny	3 (+4)	Four gunmen, two police officers, and one civilian are killed in an attack on a Christian church in downtown Grozny, Chechnya.
20 July	Kizilyurtovsky District	2	Two police officers were killed and another injured after an attack by insurgents in the village of Stal'skoye in the Kizilyurtovsky district of Dagestan.
20 August	Chechnya	0 (+5)	Several police officers are injured and at least five alleged attackers die in a series of attacks, involving stabbing, bombing and car crashing allegedly carried out by minors in Chechnya. IS claims responsibility. The Chechen leader Kadyrov denies IS involvement and threatens to collectively punish alleged attackers' relatives.
13 October	Dagestan	0 (+2)	Two insurgents from Islamic State in Caucasus were killed by security forces in the Republic of Dagestan.
29 November	Maysky District	0 (+3)	Three militants were killed during a gunfight against FSB in Maysky district, Kabardino-Balkaria. The militants had planned to kill a local politician and other security figures.
12 December	Nazran	0 (+2)	Two police officers were injured in a grenade blast in Nazran, the capital of Ingushetia. The two perpetrators were shot dead in retaliation.

== See also ==
- List of clashes in the North Caucasus in 2009
- List of clashes in the North Caucasus in 2010
- List of clashes in the North Caucasus in 2011
- List of clashes in the North Caucasus in 2012
- List of clashes in the North Caucasus in 2015
- List of clashes in the North Caucasus in 2016
- List of clashes in the North Caucasus in 2017
- List of clashes in the North Caucasus in 2019
