= 2010 Kizlyar suicide bombings =

Northern Caucasus conflict terrorist attack in Dagestan, Russia

Coordinates: 53°51′N 46°43′E

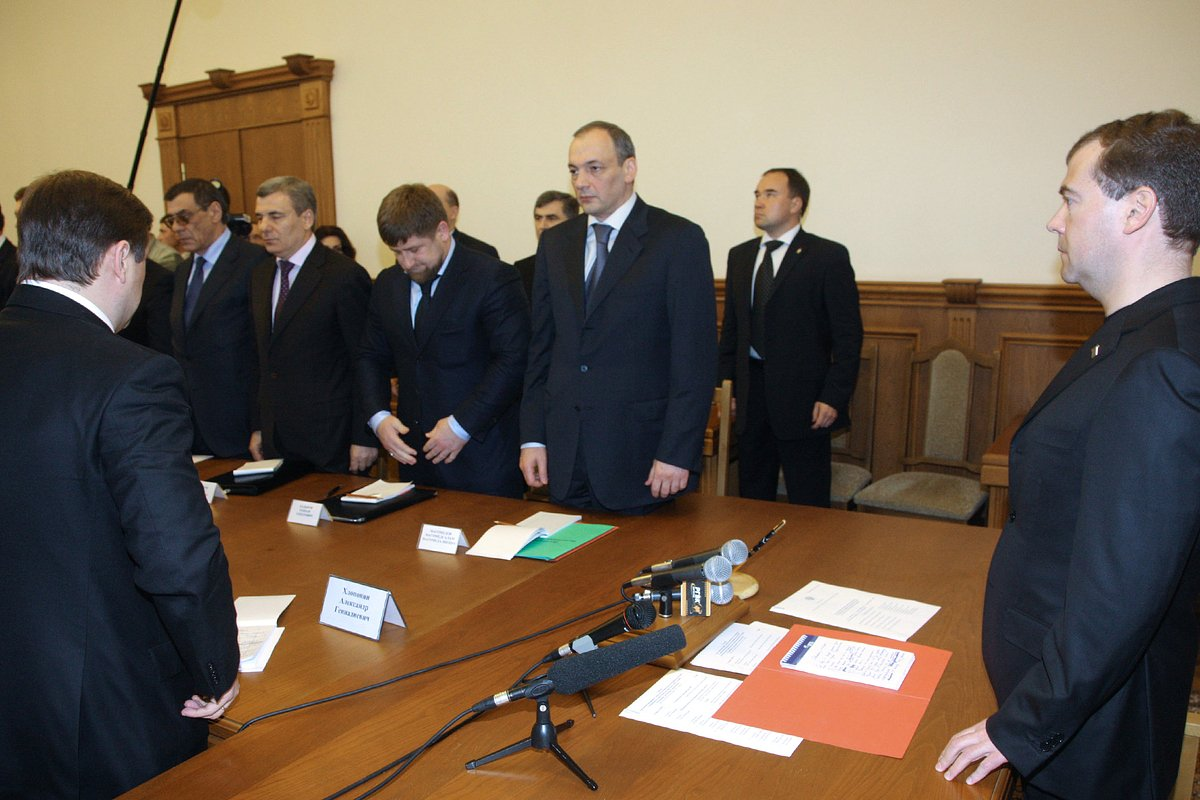
- A minute of silence for those killed in the terrorist attack in Kizlyar, April 1, 2010.
- Location: Kizlyar, Dagestan, Russia
- Date: March 31, 2010
- Target: Offices of the local interior ministry and the FSB security agency
- Attack type: Suicide bombings
- Deaths: 12
- Injuries: 18

The 2010 Kizlyar bombings were double suicide attacks that occurred on March 31, 2010 in Kizlyar, in Russia's North Caucasus republic of Dagestan. 12 people were killed and another 18 injured.
