= Kizlyar church shooting =

2018 mass shooting in Dagestan, Russia

- Part of Islamic State insurgency in the North Caucasus, Terrorism in Russia and Islamic terrorism in Europe
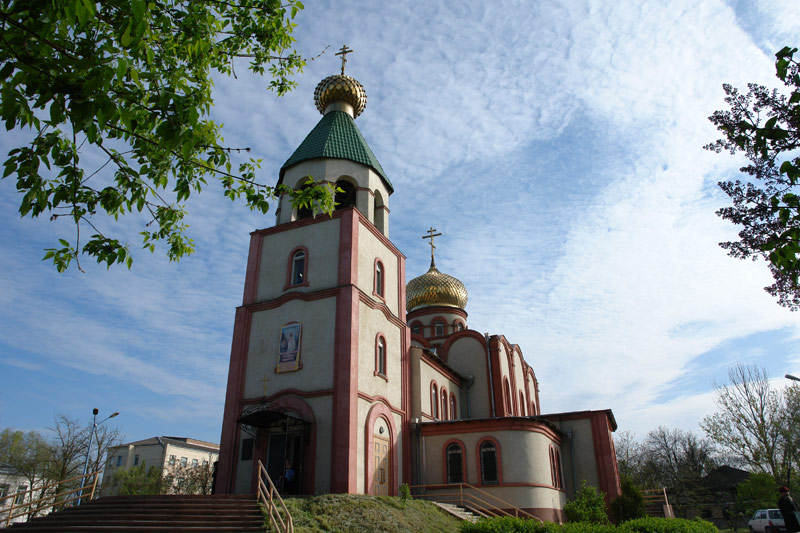
- Location: 43.8554°N 46.7142°E; Kizlyar, Dagestan, Russia
- Date: 18 February 2018; 8 years ago
- Attack type: Mass shooting
- Weapons: IZh-18 single-shot shotgun; Knife
- Deaths: 6 (including the perpetrator)
- Injuries: 4
- Perpetrator: Islamic State (IS)
- Assailant: Khalil Khalilov

On 18 February 2018, a 22-year-old man local to the Russia's southern republic of Dagestan carrying a knife and a single-shot shotgun opened fire on a crowd at an Orthodox church in Kizlyar, Dagestan, killing five women and injuring several other people, including two police and three others. He was shot and killed by police on duty nearby.

The Islamic State (IS) named the man Khalil al-Dagestani, one of its soldiers. Police named him Khalil Khalilov. Pro-IS social media later shared a video of a masked man with a shotgun and knife, said to be the killer, pledging his allegiance to Abu Bakr al-Baghdadi.

== Shooting ==
The attack occurred as churchgoers celebrated the Sunday of Forgiveness, the last day of Cheesefare week, a Christian holiday marking the last day before Lent according to the eastern Orthodox calendar. On February 18, 2018, at about 16:00 in Kizlyar, the perpetrator opened fire on a crowd of worshippers with a single-shot shotgun in the territory adjacent to the parishioners of St. George the Victorious Church. The church staff managed to quickly lock the doors, which prevented the shooter from getting inside, where about 50 people remained. Police and Rosgvardiya officers quickly arrived at the scene and engaged in a shootout with the attacker, successfully neutralizing him.

As a result of the attack, five women were killed, and several more people were injured. The attacker was eliminated by return fire.

== Victims ==
The victims of the attack were five elderly women: four of them died on the spot, the fifth died in hospital during surgery. Four more people were injured — two law enforcement officers (a policeman and a Rosgvardiya officer) and two parishioners of the temple. All the wounded were hospitalized.

== Aftermath ==
Immediately after the attack, all Orthodox churches in Dagestan were placed under armed guard. The Russian Investigative Committee opened a criminal case on the attack under part 2 of Article 105 of the Criminal Code of the Russian Federation (murder of two or more persons) and Article 205 of the Criminal Code of the Russian Federation — terrorist act. The case was taken under control by the head of the Investigative Committee of the Russian Federation Alexander Bastrykin. The criminal case of the shooting near an Orthodox church in the city of Kizlyar was terminated on November 18, 2018 "in connection with the death of the suspect"

== See also ==
- 2024 Dagestan attacks
