= 2010 Stavropol bomb blast =

Terrorist incident in Russia

- Location of Stavropol Krai in Russia
- Location: Stavropol, Stavropol Krai, Russia
- Date: 26 May 2010
- Target: Stavropol Concert Hall
- Weapon: Explosives
- Deaths: 8
- Injuries: 40
- Perpetrator: Unknown

On 26 May 2010, at least seven people were killed in a bomb blast in Stavropol, Russia. At least 40 people were injured, one from Moscow, while another is an outsider, and another from Azerbaijan or Turkey. The blast occurred before a concert.

Stavropol had not experienced such an attack in recent years before the incident; similar incidents had become more associated with Chechnya and Dagestan. Russia said the attack was a "terrorist act".

Eight people were killed in the event, a higher number than was originally reported.

== Incident ==
The explosion happened outside the Stavropol Concert Hall 15 minutes prior to the popular Chechen dance show Vainakh due to perform there. Chechen President Ramzan Kadyrov has been openly photographed with them.

Explosives compared to 200 to 250 grams of TNT were used. It is said that steel pellets were placed in a carton of juice to make the bomb. The bomb was then detonated by a remotely controlled device.

The theatre was locked down by police. Two corpses were visible by the exit. Many of those wounded are hurt in critical ways and areas. Many of those taken to hospital were detained there and died from their wounds during the night hours. A ten-year-old girl died in a regional hospital to bring the death toll to six. Another unidentified person followed her at a later stage to make it seven dead.

== Investigations ==
The incident was investigated under Russia's terrorism laws, and around 70 people were immediately questioned about the incident. Weapons were located at the homes of some of those questioned, though no one immediately admitted to carrying out the attack. Initial speculation placed blame on Islamists, neo-Nazis and skinheads.

== Response ==
Mayor of Stavropol, Nikolai Paltsev, said an as yet undecided sum of money would be given to the families of those who lost their lives. The federal budget would also assist, he said. Stavropol Territory Governor, Valery Gayevsky, described it as an attempt at "shattering national unity".
