= 2014 Grozny bombing =

2014 terrorist attack in the city of Grozny, Chechen Republic, Russia

- Location: Grozny, Chechnya, Russia
- Date: 5 October 2014
- Weapon: Bomb
- Deaths: 6 (including the bomber)
- Injuries: 12
- Perpetrator: Caucasus Emirate

The 2014 Grozny bombing was a terrorist attack in the city of Grozny, Chechen Republic, Russia. On October 5, 2014, a 19-year-old man named Opti Mudarov went to the town hall where an event was taking place to mark Grozny City Day celebrations coinciding with the birthday of Chechen President Ramzan Kadyrov. Police officers noticed him acting strangely and stopped him. The officers began to search him and the bomb which Mudarov had been carrying exploded. Five officers, along with the suicide bomber, were killed, while 12 others were wounded.
