= Vilayat Nokhchicho =

Separatist military group active during Chechen wars

- Flag of the Caucasus Emirate
- Leaders: Rustam Azhiev (Central Sector; 2007–2009); Aslambek Vadalov (Eastern Front - disbanded July 2011); Tarkhan Gaziyev (South Western Front - disbanded July 2011); Khuseyn Gakayev † (Eastern Sector); Aslan Byutukayev † (Western Sector; killed January 2021)
- Dates active: 31 October 2007 – June 2015
- Active regions: North Caucasus (Chechnya)
- Part of: Caucasus Emirate
- Wars: the Second Chechen War, Insurgency in the North Caucasus

The Province of Nokhchicho (Chechen: Vilayat Noxçiyçö, Вилаят Нохчийчоь, [vilɑˈjɑt nɔxt͡ʃijˈt͡ʃœ], Russian: Джамаат Нохчийчоь, romanized: Dzhamaat Nokhchiycho', [d͡ʑɐməˈat nəxt͡ɕɪjˈt͡ɕo]) was the Chechen-based wing of the Caucasus Emirate organisation. It was created in 2007 as one of the Emirate's six vilayats, replacing the Chechen Republic of Ichkeria.

== History ==
=== Background ===
The Chechen Republic of Ichkeria or CRI was an unrecognized secessionist government established in the Russian region of Chechnya in late 1991 by Dzhokhar Dudayev. After winning de facto independence in 1996 from the Russian Federation in the wake of the First Chechen War, it was invaded by Russia in the Second Chechen War, with direct rule of Chechnya being established in May 2000. After losing territorial control to Russia, the CRI continued to exist in the form of an insurgent group fighting a guerrilla war against the Russian Military, while some Chechen separatists also carried out attacks against civilians in Russia. The CRI was severely weakened by the conflict with the Russians in the years following, suffering many casualties and defections including the deaths of its successive Presidents, Aslan Maskhadov and Abdul Halim Sadulayev. Following the death of Sadulayev in June 2006, Dokka Umarov was elevated as the next leader of the CRI.

=== Declaration of Caucasus Emirate ===
On 7 October 2007, Dokka Umarov, President of Ichkeria, declared the establishment of the Caucasus Emirate, which sought to establish an independent Islamic State in the North Caucasus. At the same time, Umarov abolished the Chechen Republic of Ichkeria and in its place announced that it was now a province, or vilayat, of the Emirate.

=== Leadership dispute ===
In August 2010, a video was posted on the rebel Kavkaz Center website showing Dokku Umarov announcing his resignation as leader of the Caucasus Emirate and announcing Chechen commander Aslanbek Vadalov as his successor. This was followed by another video in the same month showing Umarov retracting the decision. Following these events, several commanders of the Chechen wing of the Caucasus Emirate - Tarkhan Gaziyev, Muhannad, Aslanbek Vadalov and Hussein Gakayev withdrew their oath of loyalty to Umarov. In a video, they also announced Gekayev has been elected the Emir of Chechnya.

In July 2011, a sharia court ruled in favour of Umarov and the dissident commanders reaffirmed the loyalty to him. Umarov then announced a reorganisation of the Vilayat into two military sectors, with Aslan Byutukayev being appointed as the head of the newly created Western Sector, and Hussein Gakayev being named as head the eastern sector.

=== Death of Umarov and defections to IS ===
Following the death of Caucasus Emirate leader Dokka Umarov in 2013, Byutukayev reportedly became the new head of Vilayat Nokhchicho. On 15 May 2014 a video was released online showing Aslan Byutukayev and the district commanders of the insurgency giving an oath of allegiance to the new head of the Caucasus Emirate, Aliaskhab Kebekov. This was the largest meeting of the Chechen insurgents known to have occurred since the 2011 leadership dispute. Despite this, from late 2014 many Chechen mid-level commanders retracted their oath to Kebekov and pledged loyalty to Islamic State (IS) leader Abu Bakr al-Baghdadi. In June 2015, Byutukayev announced that he had also pledged allegiance to al-Baghdadi.

== See also ==
- 2010 Tsentoroy attack
- 2010 Chechen Parliament attack
