= Aslan Byutukayev =

Chechen insurgent commander (1974–2021)

Commander of Vilayat Nokhchicho (Chechnya)

Commander of Riyad-us Saliheen Brigade of Martyrs

Personal details
- Born: 22 October 1974 Achkhoy-Martan, Chechen-Ingush ASSR, Russian SFSR, Soviet Union
- Died: 20 January 2021 (aged 46) Katyr-Yurt, Chechnya, Russia
- Cause of death: Gunshot wound
- Nickname(s): Emir Khamzat; Abubakar

Military service
- Allegiance: Caucasus Emirate (former); Islamic State
- Battles/wars: Second Chechen War; Insurgency in the North Caucasus; Islamic State insurgency in the North Caucasus

Aslan Avgazarovich Byutukayev (Chechen: Аслан Бютукаев), also known as Emir Khamzat and Abubakar (22 October 1974 – 20 January 2021), was a Chechen field commander in the Islamic State (IS) Wilayah al-Qawqaz, the commander of the Riyad-us Saliheen Brigade of Martyrs and a close associate of the deceased Caucasus Emirate leader Dokka Umarov. Byutukayev was listed as a Specially Designated Global Terrorist by the United States on 13 July 2016. He was killed by Russian special operatives in January 2021.

== Biography ==
Until 2010, Emir Khamzat was a little-known field commander. In the summer of that year, there was a dispute between Dokka Umarov and several commanders of the Chechen wing of the Caucasus Emirate. They were Tarkhan Gaziyev, Muhannad, Aslambek Vadalov and Khuseyn Gakayev. That led to Byutukayev's rapid promotion to the commander of Chechnya's Southwestern Front. He also succeeded the slain Said Buryatsky as leader of the Caucasus Emirate's unit of suicide bombers, the Riyad-us Saliheen.

In January 2011, Byutukayev trained Magomed Yevloyev, the suicide bomber who carried out the bombing of Moscow Domodedovo Airport. Shortly before the bombing, Dokka Umarov, Byutukayev and Magomed Yevloyev filmed a video, claiming responsibility for the attack.

In March 2011, it was reported that Aslan Byutukayev had been killed in an airstrike by Russian Air Force in Ingushetia, along with the deputy leader of the Caucasus Emirate, Supyan Abdullayev. However, while the rebels confirmed the death of Abdullayev, the death of Byutukayev was denied.

In June 2011, in a video released on the internet, a silent Byutukayev appeared at the side of Dokka Umarov, as the latter claimed responsibility for the assassination of Yuri Budanov, a former Russian Colonel, who kidnapped, murdered and allegedly raped an 18-year-old Chechen girl during Second Chechen War. In July 2011, at a meeting of the Caucasus Emirate's Sharia Court, Umarov appointed Byutukayev to his deputy in the newly created Western Sector of Vilayat Nokhchicho.

In May 2014, Byutukayev appeared in a video with a large number of field commanders of the Vilayat Nokhchicho, giving an oath of allegiance to the new head of the Caucasus Emirate, Aliaskhab Kebekov, who succeeded Dokka Umarov.

Toward the end of 2014, the Caucasus Emirate became more active in their insurgent activities. On 5 October 2014, a suicide bombing took place near the city hall of Grozny. Five Russian police officers and the suicide bomber were killed. Another 12 people were wounded. Byutukayev also took responsibility for the 2014 Grozny clashes, during which 14 Russian policemen were killed and a total of 35 people wounded.

== Disappearance and death ==
In June 2015, and following the death of Caucasus Emirate leader, Aliaskhab Kebekov, Byutukayev released an audio message, pledging allegiance to IS and its leader, Abu Bakr al-Baghdadi.

In 2016 according to reports he was hiding in Turkey, although this was unconfirmed.

In January 2021, he and five militants were killed in Katyr-Yurt, Chechnya as a result of a special operation of the Ministry of Internal Affairs of Chechnya.
