= 2014 Grozny clashes =

2014 attack by Islamist militants in Grozny, Chechnya, Russia

- Part of Insurgency in the North Caucasus
Date	4 December 2014
Location	Grozny, Chechnya, Russia
Result	Russian-Chechen victory

Belligerents
Russia: Chechnya	Caucasus Emirate

Commanders and leaders
(Chechnya) Ramzan Kadyrov	Aslan Byutukayev

Casualties and losses
(Chechnya) 14 policemen killed (Chechnya) 36 policemen wounded (Chechnya) 1 civilian killed	At least 11 killed

On 4 December 2014, a group of armed militants of the jihadist organization Caucasus Emirate attacked a traffic police checkpoint outside the city of Grozny, Chechnya, Russia. The militants then entered the city and occupied the "Press House" building in the city center and a nearby school.

According to the BBC, the Islamists had claimed to have launched a suicide attack in response to purported attacks by security forces on Muslim women.

== Timeline ==
On 4 December 2014, a group of Islamist militants, in three vehicles, killed three traffic policemen, after the latter had attempted to stop them at a checkpoint in the outskirts of Grozny. The militants then occupied a press building and an abandoned school, located in the center of the city. Launching a counter-terrorism operation, security forces, with the use of armored vehicles, attempted to storm the buildings and a firefight ensued.

14 policemen, 11 militants and 1 civilian were killed. Additionally 36 policemen were wounded in the incident. The Press House was also burned and severely damaged in the incident.

It has been suggested, by The New York Times and The Washington Post writers, that the timing of the attack purposefully coincided with president Vladimir Putin's delivery of an annual state-of-the-nation speech in Moscow.

== Context ==
In modern times, the conflict (with the first uprising in 1785) has included the First Chechen War (1994–1996), the War of Dagestan (1999), the Second Chechen War (1999–2009), the 2002 Grozny truck bombing, and the Insurgency in the North Caucasus (2009–present). Recent events have included the 2010 Chechen Parliament attack, and the 2014 Grozny bombing. The 2004 Beslan school hostage crisis begun by Chechen and Ingush terrorists ended with the deaths of 385 people.

== Reactions ==
Russian president, Vladimir Putin, responded in his annual speech, that "these 'rebels' have shown up in Chechnya again. I'm sure, the local law enforcement authorities will take proper care of them." The head of Chechnya, Ramzan Kadyrov, said, the "bandits" had died "a dog's death".

On Kavkaz Center website, a Chechen fighter credited Aslan Byutukayev for the attacks, saying: "There are already results. Allah killed them with our hands."

Time magazine noted, that Putin's state-of-the-nation speech was greeted at best with polite applause, as Kremlin critic Carl Bildt, Sweden's former Minister of Foreign Affairs, tweeted: "Street battle in Grozny? Moscow should have more pressing priorities than destabilising Ukraine."

== See also ==
- 2010 Tsentoroy attack
- List of Islamist terrorist attacks
- Spetsnaz
