= Emir of the Caucasus Emirate =

Title used by the leader of the former jihadist organisation Caucasus Emirate

- Емир на Кавказката емирство

- First and longest in office, Dokka Umarov (2007-2013)

The Emir of the Caucasus Emirate was the title used by leaders of the former jihadist militant group Caucasus Emirate. There have been five emirs in total, including one that, due to a misunderstanding (claimed), mistakenly assumed control and was removed from office days later.

== List of Emirs (2007-2016) ==
No.	Name (Birth – Death)	Term of Office	Notes
1	Dokka Umarov (1964–2013)	7 October 2007 – 1 August 2010	Last recognised president(-in-exile) of the Chechen Republic of Ichkeria.
–	Aslambek Vadalov (1972–)	1 August 2010 – 3 August 2010	Shortly removed from office due to mistakenly taking leadership after a misunderstanding about Umarov's quitting.
1	Dokka Umarov (1964–2013)	3 August 2010 – 7 September 2013 (deceased)	
2	Aliaskhab Kebekov (1972–2015)	8 March 2014 – 19 April 2015 (deceased)	
3	Magomed Suleimanov (1976–2015)	2 July 2015 – 11 August 2015 (deceased)	
4	Zalim Shebzukhov (1986–2016)	11 August 2015 – 17 August 2016 (deceased)	(Disputed)
