= Aliaskhab Kebekov =

North Caucasian militant (1972–2015)

Aliaskhab Alibulatovich Kebekov Алиасхаб Алибулатович Кебеков

2nd Emir of the Caucasus Emirate
- In office 18 March 2014 – 19 April 2015
- Preceded by: Dokka Umarov
- Succeeded by: Magomed Suleimanov

Supreme Qadi of the Sharia Court
- In office 14 October 2010 – 19 April 2015
- Preceded by: Magomed Vagabov
- Succeeded by: Abdulla Kosteksky (Abdullah al-Kustaki)

Personal details
- Born: Aliaskhab Alibulatovich Kebekov; 1 January 1972 Sovetsky, Dagestan ASSR, Russian SFSR, Soviet Union
- Died: 19 April 2015 (aged 43) Buynaksk, Dagestan, Russia

Military service
- Battles/wars: Insurgency in the North Caucasus

Emir of the Caucasus Emirate
- Емир на Кавказката емирство

Aliaskhab Alibulatovich Kebekov (Russian: Алиасхаб Алибулатович Кебеков; 1 January 1972 – 19 April 2015), also known as Ali Abu Muhammad (Russian: Али Абу Мухаммад), was a North Caucasian militant Islamist in North Caucasus and the leader of the Caucasus Emirate following the death of inaugural leader Dokka Umarov. Following in the same religious tradition as Umarov, he adhered to the ideology of Salafism. The United States Department of State added Kebekov to its list of Specially Designated Global Terrorists on 25 March 2015. On 19 April 2015, Kebekov was killed by Russian security forces during special operations in the settlement of Gerei-Avlak in Buynaksk. An Avar by nationality, Kebekov was the first non-Chechen to lead the North Caucasus insurgency.

== Early life and career ==
Aliaskhab Kebekov was born on 1 January 1972 in what is now the Shamilsky District of Dagestan. He joined the Vilayat Dagestan wing of the Caucasus Emirate. In October 2010, Kebekov was appointed by Dokka Umarov as the Qadi or judge of the Caucasus Emirate, responsible for giving Shariah rulings on the groups actions. Kebekov accepted the role, despite expressing doubts about his suitability, as he was not a Mujtahid or a scholar with extensive knowledge of the Koran and Sunnah.

== Caucasus Emirate leadership ==
On 16 January 2014, an audio clip was posted on YouTube, in which a voice claiming to be Kebekov acknowledged receiving the news that Umarov had died. Kebekov seemingly rejected the proposal by other emirs of the group that he should succeed Umarov, stating that he had no military experience and had never served as a commander; instead he proposed Aslambek Vadalov for the role. Nonetheless, in March he acceded to demands and accepted the appointment. The Caucasus Emirate linked Kavkaz Center announced Kebekov's appointment, together with acknowledgment of Umarov's death. In the weeks after this announcement, the site also posted pledges of allegiance to Kebekov from groups in Dagestan, Chechnya, Ingushetia and Kabardino-Balkaria, as well as members of the Chechen-led Syria-based Jaish al-Muhajireen wal-Ansar.

In a video recording posted on the Internet in June 2014, Kebekov apologised to civilians that had been harmed by Caucasus Emirate attacks and stated that civilians should not be targeted by the group. He also called on militants not to use black widows in armed attacks or suicide bombings. The Caucasus Emirate has become more active in their insurgent activities. On 5 October 2014 a suicide bombing near the Grozny city hall took place. Five Russian police officers along with the suicide bomber were killed and 12 other people were wounded. The Caucasus Emirate took credit for the attack. Byutukayev took responsibility for the 2014 Grozny clashes during which 14 Russian policemen were killed and a total of 35 people were wounded. The attack was one of the largest since the December 2013 Volgograd bombings, which were also carried out by the Caucasus Emirate. The day after the Grozny attack a Russian Federal Security Service building in neighboring Dagestan was reported to be engulfed in flames. If the attack was carried out by the Caucasus Emirate this would represent three large scale attacks in three months.

In late 2014 and early 2015, at least 6 field commanders of the Caucasus Emirate, and an unknown number of ordinary members, switched their allegiance from Kebekov to the Islamic State leader Abu Bakr al-Baghdadi.

== Death ==
On 19 April 2015, Kebekov was killed by Russian security forces during a raid on a house in the settlement of Gerei-Avlak in Buynaksk. He was reportedly succeeded as Caucasus Emirate leader by Magomed Suleimanov.

Political offices
Preceded by Dokka Umarov	Emir of the Caucasus Emirate; 2014–2015	Succeeded by Magomed Suleimanov
