= Khuseyn Gakayev =

Chechen militant (1970–2013)

Khuseyn Gakayev Хусейн Вахаевич Гакаев

Commander of Eastern Sector, Vilayat Nokhchicho (Chechnya)

Personal details
- Born: 8 July 1970 Kalinovskaya, Chechen–Ingush ASSR, Soviet Union
- Died: 24 January 2013 (aged 42) Vedeno, Chechnya, Russia

Military service
- Allegiance: Chechen Republic of Ichkeria; Caucasus Emirate
- Battles/wars: First Chechen War; Second Chechen War; North Caucasus Insurgency

Khuseyn Vakhaevich Gakayev (Russian: Хусейн Вахаевич Гакаев), also known as Emir Mansur (not to be confused with Amir Mansur, or Arbi Yovmurzaev, the Chechen nationalist commander killed in 2010) and Emir Hussein, (8 July 1970 – 24 January 2013) was a Chechen militant. He was one of the most senior field commanders still operating in the North Caucasus prior to his death on 24 January 2013.

In July 2011, Caucasus Emirate leader Dokka Umarov named Gakayev his naib (deputy) in the eastern sector of Chechnya, thus resolving the nearly year-long dispute that saw a number of nationalist field commanders break away from Umarov, with Gakayev serving as Emir of Vilayat Nokhchicho.

Gakayev was killed by Russian security forces along with his brother Muslim and nine other militants after they were surrounded in the mountains of Vedeno, Chechnya on 24 January 2013. The rebel website Kavkaz Center confirmed their deaths in a statement released on 25 January 2013.

== Biography ==
Gakayev was born on 8 July 1970 in the village of Kalinovskaya, which is located in the Naur district of Chechnya bordering Mozdok, North Ossetia. He participated in the First Chechen War from 1994 to 1996 – including the early struggle against the pro-Moscow Chechen opposition- fighting in units commanded by the legendary Shamil Basayev. Following the Khasavyurt Accord that ended the first conflict, Gakayev served as deputy commander of the Jundullah Islamic Brigade within the structure of the Eastern Front of the Chechen Republic of Ichkeria's (ChRi) armed forces, and he was also named Emir of the local Elistanzhi Jamaat of the Vedeno sector. It was in the fall of 1999 that Gakayev launched a military campaign which continues to this day in the same capacity.

On 20 August 2003, Gakayev killed Shaiman Madagov, Imam of the Vedeno district, for "cooperating with the Russian state." Gakayev was also reportedly a part of the 2004 Nazran raid commanded by Basayev, an assault which killed over sixty people and resulted in the capture of virtually the entire weapons cache of Ingushetia's police force. The operation is considered a milestone in Gakayev's career and helped propel him from the ranks of everyday militants into the upper tier of rebel leadership. It was at this point that Russian sources began to associate him with many similar operations in the region.

From spring 2006 until May 2007 Gakayev was commander of the Shali sector of the Eastern Mountain Front (renamed the Southeastern Front in September 2006). He was appointed to the position by then-president of the ChRI Abdul-Halim Sadulayev at the request of Basayev, who was then Military Emir of the Caucasus Front. Gakayev also simultaneously served as minister of internal affairs of ChRI from March to October 2007.

From May 2007 to June 2010, Gakayev was deputy commander of the Southeastern Front and in October 2007 he was named to the same position on the Eastern Front of the newly formed Caucasus Emirate. Gakayev was in charge of the Shali Mountain, Shali Plains, Argun and Ataginsky sectors, and from June 2010 to September 2010 he was the wali (head) of Vilayat Nokhchicho.

The Vedeno and Shalinsky mountain and foothill areas of the republic, specifically Elistanzhi, Agishty, Eshilhatoy and Agishbatoy are the area of operations for his guerrilla unit.

=== Family ===
Gakayev was one of six brothers, two of which, the older Jamalay and Said-Usman, were killed in fighting during the First Chechen War. His two other brothers died in combat in the Second Chechen War: Hasan in 2001 and Rizvan in 2003, both in the area of Vedeno. Khuseyn's sole surviving brother, Muslim Gakayev (also known as "Amir Muslim" or "Dunga") served as commander of the Shali sector of the Eastern Front, and in 2009 commanded a unit of suicide bombers, until his death alongside Khuseyn. In the course of the second war, his sister was abducted and remains missing since 2006, along with thousands of other Chechens who "disappeared" since 1999.

== Politics ==
From 7 March to 7 October 2007, Gakayev served as the Minister of Internal Affairs in the last cabinet of the Chechen Republic of Ichkeria under the chairmanship of Dokka Umarov. He later occupied the same post in Umarov's Interior Ministry of the Vilayat Nokhchicho (Chechnya) of the Caucasus Emirate.

On 25 July 2010, he has been briefly appointed by Umarov as Wali (governor) of the Vilayat Nokhchicho (in practice, the post of commander of the Chechen rebel forces). After the rift in leadership, he was the first deputy to the new Emirate leader Aslambek Vadalov.

== Emir of Chechnya ==
Following Umarov's retraction of his resignation, Gakayev, Vadalov and Tarkhan Gaziev, as well as the Arab commander Muhannad, renounced their oath of loyalty to Umarov, criticising his authoritarian leadership and his unilateral decision to abandon the cause of Chechen independence in favour of a Caucasian pan-Islamism (Umarov later also said they criticised him for claiming responsibility for the 2010 Moscow Metro bombings). They then removed themselves and their forces from Umarov's command. In a video, they also announced Gekayev has been elected the Emir of Chechnya. Two months later, the mutiny leaders also jointly appealed for the support of all Chechens, including those abroad, who support their vision of a free Chechnya under Islamic Sharia law. At the same time, however, Gakayev stressed that the Chechen fighters are not abandoning the idea of the joint North Caucasus emirate, in the name of which they would continue to fight, and assured the "brothers", (fellow Muslims), in Dagestan, Ingushetia, North Ossetia, and Kabardino-Balkaria that they will remain ready to render them assistance.

In October 2010, the Chechen government of Ramzan Kadyrov accused Gakayev of organising the August attack on Kadyrov's fortified home village of Tsentoroy while supposedly acting under orders from the exiled Chechen nationalist leader Akhmed Zakayev. A few days later, a Chechen Interior Ministry official again accused him of organising the Chechen Parliament attack as "a way to loudly proclaim that he is the new leader, and send a message to his foreign sponsors," an opinion which was shared by some independent observers such as Pavel Baev or Yulia Latynina. Zakayev, for his part, had formally acknowledged Gakayev as Chechnya's legitimate wartime leader, however he disclaimed any connection with the parliament attack, or any knowledge of who was behind it.

== Death ==
According to a press release from the Chechen Interior Ministry, on or around 17 January 2013 a well-camouflaged guerrilla base was discovered in a gorge in the Shatoi district. Over the next six days a search operation was carried out in the area; on 23 January a group of gunmen opened fire on police near Elistanzhi – Gakayev's native village – killing two and injuring six. Fighting continued the following day with insurgents in the heavily forested mountains of the Vedensky district. According to Chechen president Ramzan Kadyrov, a prolonged conversation took place with the militants via radio. Given the chance to surrender, Gakayev refused while offering to release the younger militants among his group who had yet to commit serious crimes. Kadyrov claimed that the insurgents then began firing on Russian forces, at which point it was decided to destroy the group.

Killed alongside Khuseyn and Muslim Gakayev were Isa Vagapov, Akhmed Labazanov, Umar Dadayev, Sidik Abazov, Ruslan Suleymanov, Aburayk Yusupkhadzhiyev, Ibrahim Saydhasanov, Vakha-Murad Bakayev, and Abuezid Dzhabrailov. One militant, Islam Temishev, surrendered.
