= 2010 Chechen Parliament attack =

Militant attack in Grozny, Chechnya, Russia

- Location: 43°18′37″N 45°40′12″E; Grozny, Chechnya, Russia
- Date: 19 October 2010; 08:45 a.m. (04:45 UTC)
- Target: Parliament of Chechnya, Grozny
- Attack type: Mass shooting, suicide bombing
- Deaths: 6–20+
- Injuries: 17–40+

The 2010 Chechen Parliament attack took place on the morning of 19 October 2010, when three Chechen militants attacked the parliament complex in Grozny, the capital of the Chechen Republic, a federal subject of Russia. At least six people were killed, including two policemen, one parliament employee and all three suicide commandos.

== Background ==
In 2010, a majority of the seats in the Parliament of the Chechen Republic were held by loyalists of the Chechen President Ramzan Kadyrov and the 2005 election was seen by critics as a "sham". The reigning government has been labeled by many observers and organizations, including Freedom House's yearly investigations and Memorial, as "totalitarian", although Kadyrov has furiously denied these allegations and characterized them as slander. Just days after the attack, parliament Speaker Dukuvakha Abdurakhmanov said the pro-Kremlin and pro-Kadyrov party United Russia, which has officially won over 99% votes with over 99% of registered voters allegedly participating in the 2007 election, could get even "115–120%" of seats in the next election.

The attack happened as a Russian federal delegation including Russian Interior Minister Rashid Nurgaliev was visiting the republic to "hear how modern Chechnya was faring in peacetime"; some members of the delegation were actually in the parliament complex when the attack took place.

Following a raid on Kadyrov's home village of Tsentoroi on 30 August, this was the second major attack since a controversial change of leadership and consequent split amongst rebels in the North Caucasus. A few months before the attack, Dokka Umarov handed over leadership of the Caucasus Emirate to the Chechen field commander Aslambek Vadalov, only to retract his resignation a few days later, causing a rift in the leadership of the group. Subsequently, the four leading field commanders in Chechnya removed themselves from Umarov's command, and stepped up attacks against the Kadyrov government.

== Attack ==
According to the Russian investigation, the attack began around 08:45 local time (04:45 UTC) on 19 October, when three men carrying Kalashnikov assault rifles and wearing combat and sand camouflage gear arrived in a Lada taxi at the grounds of the fenced off parliamentary complex. The militants told the driver to follow the deputies' cars, claiming to be bodyguards running late. When the taxi approached the front gate, the three jumped out and headed towards the entrance, opening fire at the two policemen manning the checkpoint as they ran. One policeman was killed and another was severely injured. One of the militants detonated his explosive device near the gates of the complex, while the others managed to enter the parliament building, where they opened fire and killed another policeman guarding the building as well as a parliamentary administrative manager. Six policemen and eleven civilians were wounded. A fierce firefight then ensued, in which at least two rocket-propelled grenades were discharged. Several people, mostly parliament employees, received shrapnel wounds. Meanwhile, people in the building had either escaped to the third floor or been evacuated.

Following the initial attack, an operation to eliminate the rebels was launched, with President Ramzan Kadyrov personally in charge. The operation lasted 15–20 minutes. The militants broke into the unguarded parliament building but failed to get further than the ground floor, as Chechen Interior Ministry troops from the special police squad Terek entered the building through another entrance and blocked the staircase. Trapped, the militants kept shooting until they ran out of ammunition and then blew themselves up with bombs. Five Terek personnel were hospitalised. Initially it was reported that four militants were killed during the operation, citing the deputy head of the Interior Ministry of Chechnya, Roman Edilov. However, later investigators reported that three militants took part in the attack and all of them blew themselves up, the last two to avoid capture.

== Aftermath ==
Only a few hours later, when all three buildings of the Chechen parliament were declared "cleared" by the special forces and explosives specialists, the meeting of deputies planned for that morning was held. It was attended by Chechen President Ramzan Kadyrov, dressed in a parade uniform for the occasion, and by Russian Interior Minister Rashid Nurgaliyev.

According to visiting politicians from Sverdlovsk, who had actually witnessed the attack but escaped it unhurt, Kadyrov first apologised to them for what happened, and then Nurgaliyev praised the Chechen police for conducting "the special operation to neutralize terrorists" in just 15–20 minutes (eyewitnesses from his delegation and members of the investigation, however, told Kommersant that shooting continued for at least two hours). Nurgaliyev claimed, "An operational environment such as today's is very rare. Here, there is stability and security." Kadyrov also accused the exiled Chechen nationalist leader Akhmed Zakayev and his supporters in London of organising the attack from abroad.

=== Investigation ===
One of the attackers, all of whose bodies were badly mutilated, was identified as Muslim Chichkanov, a 22-year-old from the Chechen village of Sernovodsk, who had been an active member of "an illegal armed group" since the end of 2009. The other two militants remained unidentified.

== Responsibility ==
The Caucasian Knot reported that its local experts said the attack was probably organised by Gakayev, Vadalov and others who are now "out of Umarov's hands".

Akhmed Zakayev denied responsibility for the attack. His assistant condemned it and said that Zakayev has "always spoken against this sort of actions". Zakayev, who previously had formally acknowledged Gakayev as Chechnya's legitimate wartime leader, disclaimed any connection with the attack, or any knowledge of who was behind it. However, Russia's General Prosecutor's Office put Zakayev back on their international wanted list.

== Reactions ==
=== In Russia ===
President of Chechnya Ramzan Kadyrov vowed to intensify the fight against militants in the republic, calling them "bandits". He also blamed the UK and Poland saying they were "harbouring criminals. Why do they shield bandits who have shed blood where there is western democracy? Where is the justice? ... Sooner or later Zakayev, Gakayev, Umarov, Vadalov and other criminals will get what they deserve ... I have no doubt that it was the drunk and alcoholic Akhmed Zakayev and his backers in London and other western capitals. I want to say that they will not achieve anything. The Chechen republic is still standing. It is a peaceful and stable region."

Usman Ferzauli, spokesman for the Chechen Republic of Ichkeria government-in-exile (in opposition to the Caucasus Emirate), declared that they condemn the attack. Zakayev and the rest of the Ichkerian government-in-exile had already distanced themselves from the Islamists three years before the attack. Zakayev blames them for associating with figures which "spit on Chechen Independence", that the existence of the Caucasus emirate damaged Chechen goals of independence by weakening the Chechen Republic of Ichkeria, and alleging that a member of the Caucasian Emirate government, Movladi Udugov, is an agent provocateur for Russia. The Caucasian Emirate retaliated by alleging that Zakayev worked in the interest of Russia.

=== In the European Union ===
European Union foreign policy chief Catherine Ashton condemned the attack, saying that "no circumstances can justify the use of terrorist violence and suicide attacks." She also said that the EU is ready to support Russia in its fight against international terrorism. In a message of condolence, European Parliamentary President Jerzy Buzek said that violence and murder could not be accepted "as a form of protest. It is of utmost importance for the Russian authorities to show their full commitment to enhancing the rule of law and to ensure that it is properly and equally applied. We confirm our readiness to strengthen cooperation with the Russian Federation in the fight against international terrorism."

Mevlüt Çavuşoğlu, President of the Parliamentary Assembly of the Council of Europe, said he was "shocked and angered" to learn of the terrorist attack, describing it as all the more shocking because it targeted a parliament, "the symbol of the people".

=== Analysis ===
Alexei Malashenko, an analyst at the Carnegie Centre, called the attack "a slap in the face for Ramzan Kadyrov" and said it was symbolic because it occurred during the Interior Minister's visit, amid high security.

Another expert on the region, Alexei Vanchenko, described it as the rebels showing that the situation in Chechnya was "out of the control of central government" and said that it, together with problems in Central Asia, spelled great danger for Russia.

Yevgeny Volk, an analyst at the Yeltsin Foundation, read the attack as a proof that "the bet on Kadyrov, who promised to place everything under control, proved wrong" and added that "the Kremlin has run out of ideas for a solution to this problem".

Laurence Lee of Al Jazeera English suggested the attack could indicate a tactical change by the Mujahideen in the region, calling it a "direct attack on Moscow's rule in Chechnya".

The Caucasian Knot suggested that the verbal attacks on Zakayev by Kadyrov were mainly for the self-seeking motives of the latter:

Firstly, Kadyrov 'had forgotten' that to accuse a person of committing a crime, a respective judgment is necessary. Secondly, Kadyrov, in the presence of the deputies of the legislative body and the Minister of Interior Affairs of Russia, has openly called for [the] murdering of not only Zakaev, Gakaev and [the] other gunmen's leaders but also members of their families and relatives. That is, he meant the principle of collective responsibility, a criminal one in its essence, and in fact he called for reprisal against quite innocent people...neither the Minister of Interior Affairs of Russia nor the deputies who are under his control expressed any reaction to all these.

== See also ==
- Chechen suicide attacks
- Insurgency in the North Caucasus
- List of attacks on legislatures
