= 2009 Nevsky Express bombing =

Bombing of a high speed train travelling between Moscow and Saint Petersburg

- Uglovka, Okulovsky District, Novgorod Oblast, Russia

Details
- Date: 27 November 2009; 21:25/21:30/21:34/21:35/21:48 MSK (UTC+3)
- Location: Between Alyoshinka and Uglovka, Novgorod Oblast
- Coordinates: 58°7′33″N 33°40′25″E
- Country: Russia
- Line: Oktyabrskaya Railway
- Operator: Russian Railways
- Incident type: Derailment
- Cause: Terrorist act, bombing (29.288 MJ)

Statistics
- Trains: 1
- Passengers: 660+
- Deaths: 28
- Injured: 96 + 1
- Damage: 1 km of railway, 4 carriages

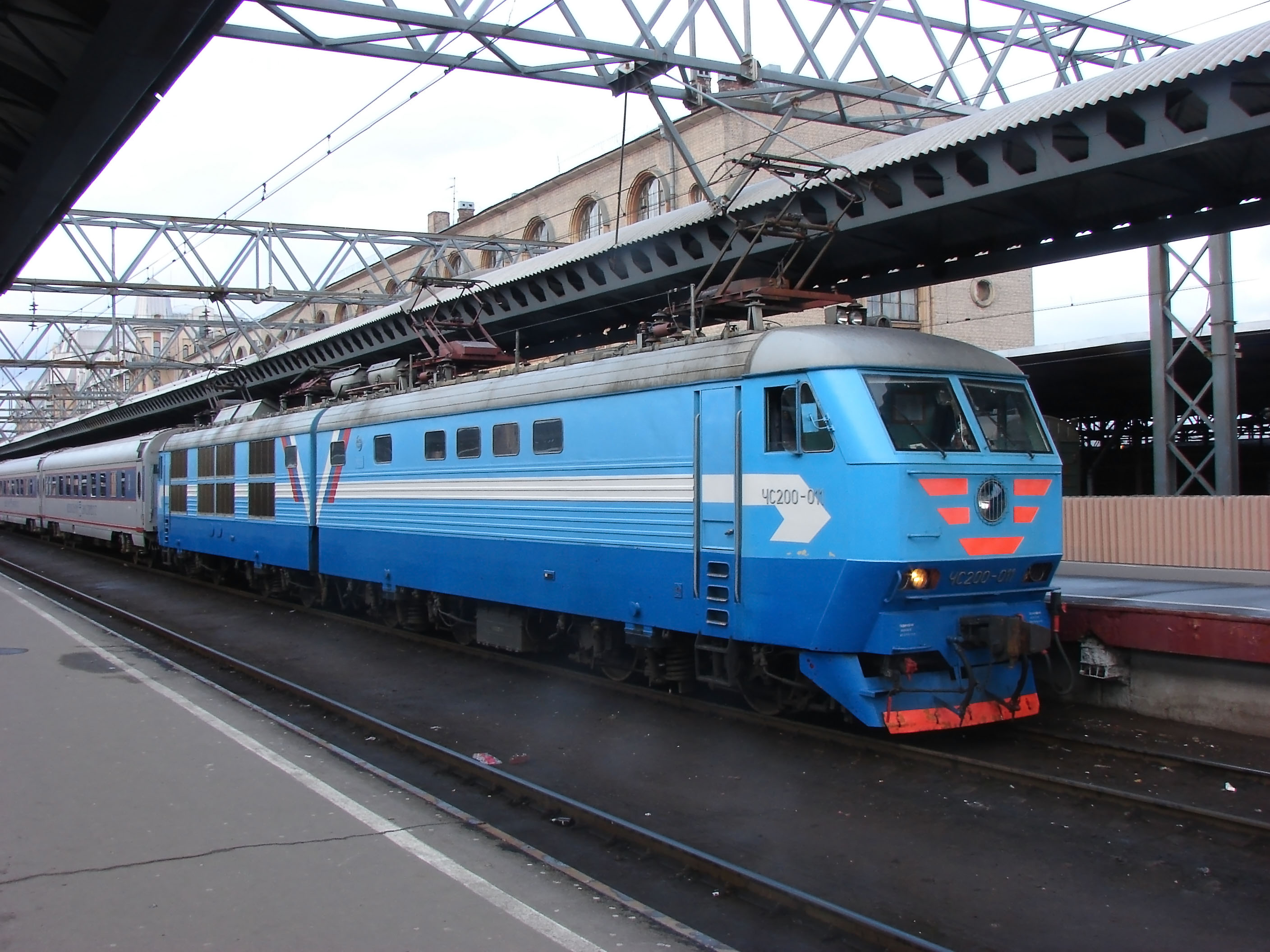
Electric locomotive Škoda ChS200 (66E) with "Nevsky Express" train

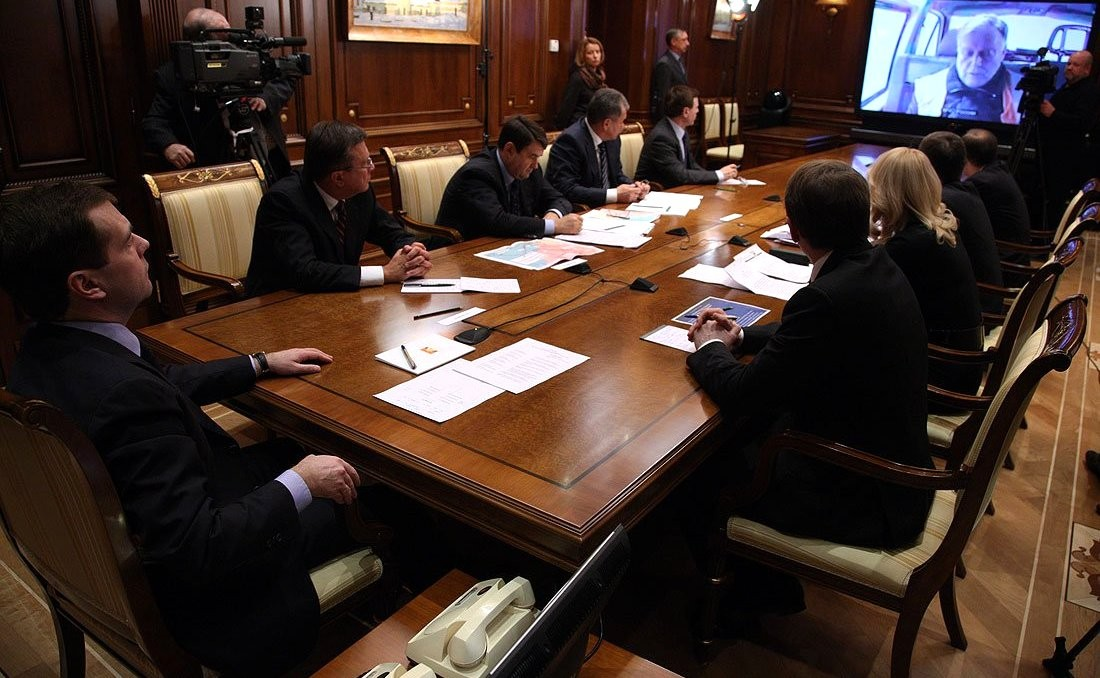
Conference with Vladimir Yakunin

Special meeting with Dmitry Medvedev

The 2009 Nevsky Express bombing occurred on 27 November 2009 when a bomb exploded under a high speed train travelling between the Russian cities of Moscow and Saint Petersburg causing derailment near the town of Bologoye, Tver Oblast (approximately 200 miles or 320 kilometres from Moscow), on the Moscow–Saint Petersburg Railway. The derailment occurred at 21:34 local time (18:34 UTC). Russian officials had stated that 39 people were killed and 95 injured but later retracted that estimate. 27 deaths had been reported by 2 December. A second bomb exploded at the scene of the investigation the following day, injuring one. It was reported to have been triggered by a remote mobile phone.

The first respondents were residents of Lykoshino, a nearby village. A field hospital was set up to treat the wounded and at least 50 were hospitalised in Saint Petersburg. It is believed that, at the time of the derailment, the Nevsky Express was carrying 661 passengers in 13 carriages, of which the last four were thought to have been affected by the incident. Initial reports blamed an electrical fault for the derailment, but investigation showed that the derailment may have been caused by an act of terrorism; a crater was found in the ground near the crash site.

The government confirmed that the accident was caused by terrorists, making this attack Russia's deadliest outside the North Caucasus region since the 2004 Russian aircraft bombings.

== Cause ==
About 44 minutes before the incident the high-speed train Sapsan was doing a trial run in the same area.

Russian media initially reported that the cause of the derailment was an electrical fault. Witness reports mentioned a "loud bang"; another passenger told reporters in St Petersburg there had been no blast. Interfax news agency said a 3-foot-wide (0.91 m) crater had been found next to the railway track; Reuters reporters at the scene did not see one. The discovery of a 1 m (3.3 ft) crater under the tracks altered the focus of the investigation as officials suspected that the incident might be the result of a terrorist attack. Later on 28 November, Alexander Bortnikov, head of the Federal Security Service (FSB), reported to President Dmitry Medvedev that the train was derailed by an explosion of 29.288 MJ.

Early investigation reports did not indicate consensus over the cause. While some reports indicated suspicion of terrorist-related activities, one law enforcement official said that the crater "must be just a pit someone dug out [or could have been] left by an explosive device". Some railway engineers additionally suggested that derailment may have been caused by one or several technical failures without any explosion involved.

Responsibility for the attack had first been claimed by far-right nationalists, then by the "Caucasian Mujahadeen" on orders from Dokka Umarov, who is considered to be "the leader of the Islamist insurgency in the North Caucasus." The attack was claimed to have been part of a series of attacks planned to Russian infrastructure. Vladimir Yakunin, the head of Russian railways, noted similarities between this attack and the 2007 Nevsky Express bombing; responsibility for the 2009 attack is yet to be confirmed.

Chechen evidence linked to the train explosion was found during an investigation that took place following a raid on suspected rebels on 2–3 March 2010, in which a close associate of Umarov, Said Buryatsky, along with 7 other suspects were killed. According to Bortnikov, bomb material "identical" to what was used in the 2007 train attack had also been uncovered during the raid.

=== Casualties ===
The train was popular with government officials and Russian business executives.

Notable deaths

- Boris Evstratikov – head of Rosreserve
- Sergei Tarasov – chairman of Rosavtodor, ex-representative of the St. Petersburg in the Federation Council of Russia
- Lyudmila Mukhina – deputy head of the Office of Science of Rosrybolovstvo

Notable injuries

- Dmitry Goin – deputy head of Rosreserve
- Alexander Poshivay – head of administration of Rosreserve

== Second bomb ==
A second, weaker bomb exploded the next day, 28 November at 14:00 (11:00 UTC), near the site of the first blast. The bomb was detonated by remote control, and was apparently targeted at investigators, injuring Alexander Bastrykin, the head of the Investigative Committee and highest-ranking government official to visit the scene. No deaths were reported.

== Response ==
President Dmitry Medvedev was informed of the incident and ordered an investigation by the FSB, while the Emergency Situations Minister held a crisis meeting with the interior and Health Ministers. As per the Russian Interior Minister Rashid Nurgaliyev, several leads have been pursued and criminal case was opened under Articles 205 (terrorism) and Article 222 (illegal possession or storage of weapons or explosives) of the Russian Criminal Code. In a televised Q&A session on 3 December, Prime Minister Vladimir Putin also called for tough measures against the perpetrators of the bombing and reiterated terrorism still caused significant threats to the country. On 3 December, Russia's Transport police released sketches of four possible suspects one of which is believed to be a female. Russian Security Services allege these individuals had rented a house in the nearby village with a purpose of establishing train movement schedules for planning the attack and subsequently planted the explosives.

== Charges ==
On 31 March 2010, the official investigation resulted in charges of terrorism, participation in unlawful armed formations and illegal trafficking in explosives and ammunition against 12 ethnic Ingush from the village of Ekazhevo in Ingushetia; 11 of them have the last name Kartoyev and are related; the 12th is Zelimkhan Aushev. The alleged leader of the terrorist cell was an Islamist preacher known as Said Abu Saad al-Buryatia or Said Buryatsky. Said Buryatsky was killed in a clash with police in March 2010. Final version of the indictment was filed on 20 January 2011, with 9 Kartoyevs and Aushev charged.

== See also ==
- 2007 Nevsky Express bombing (Malaya Vishera)
- List of terrorist incidents involving railway systems
- List of Russian rail accidents
- Terrorism in Russia
