= Magomed Suleimanov =

North Caucasian militant (1976–2015)

Muhammad Suleimanov
- Мухаммад Сулейманов

3rd Emir of the Caucasus Emirate
- In office 2 July 2015 – 11 August 2015
- Preceded by: Aliaskhab Kebekov
- Succeeded by: Position abolished

Personal details
- Born: 29 February 1976 Gimry, Dagestan ASSR, RSFSR, Soviet Union
- Died: 11 August 2015 (aged 39) Gimry, Dagestan, Russia

Military service
- Battles/wars: Insurgency in the North Caucasus

Emir of the Caucasus Emirate
- Эмир Кавказского Эмирата

Muhammad Aliyevich Suleimanov (Russian: Мухаммад Алиевич Сулейманов; 29 February 1976 – 11 August 2015), also known as Abu Usman Gimrinsky (Russian: Абу Усман Гимринский), was a North Caucasian Islamist in North Caucasus and the third leader of the Caucasus Emirate militant group.

== Biography ==
An ethnic Avar from the Dagestani village of Gimry, Suleimanov studied at the Fatah al-Islami University in Damascus in 1992. In 2005, he returned to Dagestan and became the Qadi (judge) of the central mosque in Gimry. In 2006, Suleimanov joined Dagestan's armed insurgency, however in 2008 he surrendered to authorities and received an amnesty.

In 2009, Suleimanov rejoined the insurgency, where he would serve as both the Qadi of the Caucasus Emirate's Vilayat Dagestan branch, and the military commander of Vilayat Dagestan's Mountain Sector, which included his home village of Gimry.

In 2014, Rustam Asildarov and a number of other senior Caucasus Emirate commanders announced their defection to the Islamic State (IS), swearing an oath of allegiance to its leader, Abu Bakr al-Baghdadi. Both, Suleimanov and Caucasus Emirate leader, Aliaskhab Kebekov, condemned this as a betrayal.

Following the killing of Aliaskhab Kebekov by Russian security forces in April 2015, Suleimanov was chosen as the new leader of the Caucasus Emirate, however he was not formally announced until 2 July 2015.

== Death ==
On 11 August 2015, Muhammad Suleimanov was killed in special operations by Russian security forces during a raid near Gimry in Russia's republic of Dagestan.

Political offices
| Preceded by Aliaskhab Kebekov | Emir of the Caucasus Emirate; 2015 | Succeeded by Zalim Shebzukhov |
