= Riyad-us Saliheen Brigade of Martyrs =

Terrorist organization

Riyad-us Saliheen
- Риядус-Салихийн
- Leaders: Shamil Basayev †; Said Buryatsky †; Aslan Byutukayev †
- Dates active: October 1999 – August 2016
- Active regions: Russia
- Part of: Chechen Republic of Ichkeria (1999–2007); Caucasian Emirate (2007–2016)
- Wars: Second Chechen War; Insurgency in the North Caucasus

Riyad-us Saliheen (Russian: Риядус-Салихийн, also transliterated as Riyadus-Salikhin, Riyad us-Saliheyn or Riyad us-Salihiin) was the name of a small force of suicide attackers (shahid). Since early 2003, the group was designated by the United States and subsequently by the United Nations as a terrorist organization. Its original leader (amir) was the Chechen commander Shamil Basayev. After several years of inactivity, Riyad-us Saliheen was reactivated by the Caucasus Emirate in 2009 under the command of Said Buryatsky; following his death, Aslan Byutukayev became its new leader.

== History ==
Riyad-us Salihen was a highly autonomous and small (probably only 20 to 50 members at any given time) group that was first founded and led by Shamil Basayev under the name of Riyadus Salihiin Reconnaissance and Sabotage Battalion of Chechen Martyrs (later also known as Islamic Brigade of Shaheeds) in October 1999 as a "special battalion to carry out acts of sabotage" in retaliation for the Grozny missile attack. Basayev took responsibility for a series of suicide attacks in Chechnya and Russia, including the truck bombing which destroyed the Chechen Republic's government headquarters in Grozny and killed over 80 in 2002, the truck bomb attack at Chechnya's FSB headquarters in Znamenskoye which killed more than 50 in 2003, the truck bomb attack at a Russian military hospital in Mozdok, North Ossetia, which killed at least 50 the same year, and a series of "Operation Boomerang" suicide bombings (many of them conducted by women) which have killed over 200 civilians in Moscow and elsewhere in Russian heartland, including 90 killed in the simultaneous aircraft bombings over two Russian regions in 2004. Riyad-us Saliheen also took responsibility for the involvement in the hostage crises in Moscow in 2002 and Beslan in 2004, which together have resulted in more than 500 hostage fatalities. In 2005 the group had been reportedly disbanded by Basayev under pressure from the Chechen separatist president Sheikh Abdul Halim, as a condition for Basayev to enter the official leadership of the separatist government. In any case it did not display any activity for more than four years after September 2004.

In early 2009, the leader of the Pan-Caucasian mujahideen, Dokka Umarov, announced the revival of the group as Riyad-us-Saliheen Brigade of Martyrs (without its "Chechen" part of the name, although the group is often referred by media as such anyway), saying he has 20 people fully prepared for "martyr operations". Since then the now much more ethnically-diversified group took responsibility for a series of suicide and other attacks in the Russian republics in North Caucasus and elsewhere, including the 2009 car bombing which killed at least 25 at police headquarters in Nazran, Ingushetia, a car bomb assassination attempt at the Ingush president Yunus-Bek Yevkurov, and the killing of scores of policemen in numerous smaller suicide attacks in Chechnya and Ingushetia, and since the beginning of 2010 eventually also in Dagestan. It also took responsibility for the 2009 Sayano-Shushenskaya hydro accident, was blamed by some for the 2010 Moscow Metro bombings, and has also been alleged to be behind the 2011 Domodedovo International Airport bombing.

The most recent operation claimed by the Brigade was the assassination of the convicted Russian war criminal Yuri Budanov in Moscow on 10 June 2011. However, this was refuted by the rebel website Kavkaz Center the very next day, triggering confusion over the original claim.

== See also ==
- Chechen suicide attacks
- Riyad-us Saliheen
- Shahidka
