= Dokka Umarov =

Chechen warlord and first emir of the Caucasus Emirate (1964–2013)

- Ӏумар Доккa
- Umarov during the Caucasus insurgency

1st Emir of the Caucasus Emirate
- In office 31 October 2007 – 7 September 2013
- Preceded by: Position established
- Succeeded by: Aliaskhab Kebekov

5th President of the Chechen Republic of Ichkeria
- Acting
- In office 17 June 2006 – 31 October 2007
- Vice President: Shamil Basayev (acting); Supyan Abdullayev (acting)
- Preceded by: Abdul-Halim Sadulayev (acting)
- Succeeded by: Position abolished (Prime Minister in exile: Akhmed Zakayev)

Personal details
- Born: 13 April 1964 Kharsenoi, Chechen-Ingush ASSR, Russian SFSR, Soviet Union
- Died: September 7, 2013 (aged 49) Sunzhensky District, Ingushetia, Russia
- Children: 6

Military service
- Allegiance: Chechen Republic of Ichkeria (1994–2007); Caucasus Emirate (2007–2013)
- Years of service: 1994–2013
- Rank: Emir of the Caucasus Emirate
- Battles/wars: First Chechen War; Second Chechen War; North Caucasus Insurgency; War in Ingushetia

Doku Khamatovich Umarov (Chechen: Ӏумар Хьамади кӏант Докка, romanized: Jumar Ẋamadi khant Dokka, [ʕuˈmɑr ħɑmɑdi ˈkʼɑnt doˈkːɑ]; Russian: Доку Хаматович Умаров, Doku Khamatovich Umarov; 13 April 1964 – 7 September 2013), often known as Dokka Umarov, was a Chechen militant in the North Caucasus. Umarov was a major military figure in both wars in Chechnya during the 1990s and 2000s, before becoming the leader of the greater insurgency in the North Caucasus. He was active mostly in south-western Chechnya, near and across the borders with Ingushetia and Georgia.

During the late 1990s, after Chechnya's first war against Russia, Movladi Udugov's status as war hero enabled him to take the post of the breakaway Republic's Security Minister. Between 2006 and 2007, following the death of his predecessor Sheikh Abdul Halim, Umarov became the underground President of Ichkeria of the unrecognized government of the Chechen Republic of Ichkeria, the post that Umarov eventually abolished himself when he renounced and abandoned Chechen nationalism in favour of Caucasian pan-Islamism and jihadist ideology.

The political mantle of Chechen nationalist separatism was formally taken over by the self-exiled Akhmed Zakayev, Umarov's former wartime comrade and friend turned political rival. Having quit the position of Chechen separatist leader, Umarov subsequently became the self-proclaimed Emir of the entire North Caucasus region of Russia, declaring it a putative Islamic state of the Caucasus Emirate. In 2010, Umarov abortively resigned from the position and appointed Aslambek Vadalov as the new Emir of the Caucasus Emirate, but soon afterwards issued a statement annulling the previous declaration and stating he would remain in his position and rebel Sharia court ruled in favour of Umarov over the rift, following which most other Russian rebel leaders re-swore allegiance to him.

For years, Umarov had been the top terrorist leader in Russia. He had taken responsibility for several attacks on civilian targets since 2009, including the 2010 Moscow Metro bombings and the 2011 Domodedovo International Airport bombing. In 2012, Umarov ordered his followers to halt attacks on the civilian population of Russia, while leaving military and security personnel as legitimate targets. In July 2013, however, he announced the end of this moratorium and calling on Islamic insurgents in the Caucasus and beyond to forcibly prevent the holding of the Sochi 2014 Olympics. Umarov was internationally wanted by the governments of Russia and the United States. In 2011, the United Nations Security Council's Al-Qaida and Taliban Sanctions Committee added Umarov to the list of individuals allegedly associated with al-Qaeda and the Taliban.

On 18 March 2014, Umarov's death was reported by the Caucasus Emirate-associated Islamist website Kavkaz Center, which offered no details but did say his death was confirmed by the Command of the Caucasus Emirate. He was announced to be replaced by the Caucasus Emirate's senior Sharia judge Ali Abu Mukhammad, who then officially confirmed the death of Umarov in a video posted on YouTube. According to a report posted on Kavkaz Center, Umarov was poisoned on 6 August 2013 and died at dawn on 7 September 2013. On 25 September 2017, Russian media reported that the body of Umarov had possibly been found in a remote mountainous area in Ingushetia.

== Early life ==
Umarov was born in April 1964 in the small village of Kharsenoi (Kharsenoy) in the southern Shatoysky District region of the Chechen–Ingush Autonomous Soviet Socialist Republic, into what he described as an intelligentsia family belonging the Malkoy teip (the same clan as the warlord Arbi Barayev and Chechnya's former foreign minister Ilyas Akhmadov). According to some sources, Umarov might have been convicted during his teenage years between 1980 and 1982 for either hooliganism, negligent homicide, or manslaughter. Umarov studied at the Oil Institute in Grozny, graduating with a degree in construction engineering. He later left the republic for the other parts of the Soviet Union and was reportedly working in the construction in Moscow when the First Chechen War began in December 1994. There were also reports that he was engaged in "semi-criminal activities" in Tyumen Oblast.

=== Personal life ===
Dokka Umarov was married, and believed to have six children, the youngest of whom was born in 2006. Two of Umarov's brothers, Isa and Musa, have been killed in combat. Since 2003, several of Umarov's relatives, including all of his immediate family, have been kidnapped by "unidentified armed men"; some were promptly released, but the others have disappeared and may be dead.

Shortly after the Beslan hostage-taking raid in 2004, during which Umarov's close relatives were held for several days at Khankala military base near Grozny, Prosecutor General of Russia Vladimir Ustinov suggested the practice of taking rebel leaders' relatives hostage. In 2005, the Russian leading human rights group Memorial blamed pro-Moscow Chechen forces (Kadyrovtsy) for a policy of abductions of the rebels' relatives. On 5 May 2005, a group of masked attackers kidnapped Umarov's wife, his one-year-old son, and his 74-year-old father, Khamad (Hamad). According to the rebel sources, Umarov's family was abducted by the employees of the Oil Regiment (Neftepolk, headed by Adam Delimkhanov) and held in the Kadyrov family's private prison in the village of Tsentoroi. On 24 February 2005, Umarov's younger brother Ruslan was kidnapped by armed men and then allegedly tortured by the Federal Security Service (FSB) at Khankala base.

Umarov's wife and son were later freed, but his elderly father and the younger brother both "disappeared"; in April 2007, Umarov stated that his father had been murdered in captivity. In August 2005, Umarov's sister, Natalia Khumaidova, was abducted in the Chechen town of Urus-Martan; she was released days later, after local residents protesting for her return rallied and blocked a federal highway. In 2003–2004, his cousin Zaurbek Umarov and nephew Roman Atayev were reportedly detained in Chechnya and Ingushetia, and then "disappeared".

== First Chechen War and interwar period ==
Umarov said he returned to Chechnya to fulfill what he called his patriotic duty. During the 1994–1996 war, he took part in the fighting against the intervention of Russian federal forces, initially serving under the command of Ruslan Gelayev in the special force popularly known as Gelayev's Spetsnaz (Gelayevskiy Spetsnaz). In 1996, Umarov left the unit because of disagreements with Gelayev and joined the command of Akhmed Zakayev, who had also left Gelayev's ranks to lead the splinter unit Wolf (Borz). In the course of the war, in which his unit was expanded into a battalion and then a regiment, Umarov was promoted to the rank of brigadier general and won two of Chechnya's highest awards for valor and bravery: Hero of the Nation (Kyoman Turpal) and Honor of the Nation (Kyoman Syi).

Following the Khasav-Yurt Accord that ended the war in 1996 and the presidential election of Aslan Maskhadov in January 1997, Umarov was named by Maskhadov to head the Chechen Security Council, tasked with helping to contain growing chaos in the ruined republic. In that position, he intervened in July 1998 to quash armed clashes between Chechen moderates and Islamic extremists in the city of Gudermes. However, Umarov was forced to resign from this post, and the council was disbanded due to his failure to stabilise the situation in Chechnya and persistent rumors of his alleged participation in the practice of taking hostages for ransom (possibly in relationship with Arbi Barayev, who was widely accused of being a kidnapper).

== Second Chechen War ==
Umarov began his participation in the Second Chechen War in September 1999, as a field commander, again cooperating closely with Ruslan Gelayev during the Russian siege for Grozny. In early 2000, Umarov sustained a serious wound to his face and jaw as he was leaving the surrounded Grozny, and was hospitalized in a neutral country, probably Georgia (or possibly in southern Russia in a secret cooperation with elements within Russian secret services, as it was alleged by Novaya Gazeta journalist and former Russian military officer Vyacheslav Izmailov), alongside the also injured and evacuated Zakayev. After his convalescence (including undergoing extensive plastic surgery), Umarov raised and led a militia force in Georgia's remote Pankisi Gorge before his return to Chechnya in the summer of 2002.

Back in Chechnya, Umarov became the replacement of Isa Munayev on the post of the commander of Southwestern Front (comprising an estimated 1,000 fighters by 2004), the military region southwest of Grozny that bordered on Georgia and Ingushetia. He was regarded as an ally of Shamil Basayev, then based in the south-eastern Vedensky District.

In 2003, Umarov led his men in the heavy fighting around the town of Shatoy and, according to the Russian sources, ordered the bombing of Ingushetia's FSB headquarters in the Ingush capital of Magas and the attack on electrical infrastructure facilities in the city of Kislovodsk in Stavropol Krai. After Gelayev's death in February 2004, many of his remaining men joined Umarov's group. The next summer, together with Basayev, Umarov was one of the leaders of a large-scale raid by Chechen and Ingush fighters that killed scores of Ingushetia's officials and members of the security forces and briefly seized control over the republic's largest town, Nazran.

Through 2005, there were numerous inaccurate reports of Umarov's death or grave injury. In January, he was reported to have been killed in a gun battle with Russian special forces near the Georgian border. In March, he was reported to have been seriously wounded by a Spetznaz assassination team. In September, the MVD announced it had found "Umarov's grave", and the following month, in October, he was once again falsely reported dead in the rebel raid on Nalchik, the capital city of Kabardino-Balkaria. In April 2005, Russian special forces destroyed a small guerrilla unit during a battle in a residential area of Grozny after receiving intelligence that Umarov was with them, yet he was not found among the dead. In May 2005, Umarov was reportedly seriously hurt when he stepped on an anti-personnel mine. He was said to have lost a leg in the blast, but turned out to be only lightly injured and participated in an attack on the village of Roshni-Chu three months later. In May 2006, Chechen police discovered his headquarters bunker in the center of the village of Assinovskaya on the border with Ingushetia, but Umarov managed to escape. On 2 June 2005 he was appointed as the vice president of the separatist government of the Chechen Republic of Ichkeria (ChRI).

=== Chechen presidency ===
As Vice President of Ichkeria, Umarov was automatically elevated to the position as supreme leader of the ChRI following the death of President of Ichkeria Sheikh Abdul-Halim Sadulayev on 17 June 2006. Having become president, Umarov held such posts as the head of the State Defense Council; Amir (commander) of the Madzhlis Shura of the Caucasus; Supreme Commander of the Armed Forces of the Chechen Republic of Ichkeria; and finally, Amir of the Mujahideen of the Caucasus. In his first published comments since assuming the role of president, Umarov vowed to expand the conflict to "many regions of Russia", praised his predecessor Sadulayev, indicated that a special unit was being formed to fight Chechnya's "most odious traitors" (a remark believed to refer to pro-Moscow Chechen leaders) and stressed that Chechen fighters and their allies would attack only military and police targets within Russia, including in the newly declared Urals and Volga Region Fronts.

On 27 June 2006, Umarov appointed the maverick Chechen commander Shamil Basayev to the position of vice-president of the separatist government, simultaneously releasing him from his position as first deputy prime minister. Umarov's foreign minister, Usman Firzauli, said that the appointment was meant to force Russia into political negotiations, for if they killed Umarov, then the radical Basayev would have become the official leader of the Chechen separatist movement. However, Basayev was killed soon afterward, in July 2006. In October 2007, Umarov posthumously restored the disgraced field commander Arbi Barayev to the rank of brigadier general, which had been stripped by Maskhadov in 1998; this was a considered especially strange move given Barayev's infamy and reputed close links with the FSB.

On 18 August 2006, Umarov was falsely announced to have surrendered at the Gudermes residence of Ramzan Kadyrov, the Russian-backed leader of Chechnya, under a Russian amnesty provision enacted after Basayev's death. However, Russian authorities later reversed it to a claim of surrender of Umarov's "younger brother and former head of bodyguards". Umarov maintained he has no younger brother and the later reports identified the alleged surrenderee as Doku's older brother, Akhmad, instead. Chechen separatists said that the older Umarov had disappeared two years before when he supposedly gave up and called it "a PR stunt". Umarov previously called the amnesty as "a hopeless attempt by the Kremlin regime to shroud the real situation in lies."

On 23 November 2006, large numbers of Defense Ministry and FSB troops, without the participation of Chechen police, supported by helicopters and artillery barrages, were reported to have surrounded Umarov and his forces in a forest near the village of Yandi-Katar in the Achkhoy-Martanovsky District, on the internal border between Ingushetia and Chechnya. According to Kommersant, Umarov was wounded in the operation but managed to escape the pursuit. He spent the winter months traveling across the mountains to the nearby republic of Kabardino-Balkaria to meet with local jamaats fighting Russian authorities in the region and consolidate the Caucasian Front, the pan-Caucasian Islamic militant network set up by Sadulayev. In April 2007, a group of fighters that might have been personally led by Umarov shot down a special forces helicopter with the Spetsnaz GRU troops near Shatoy, killing at least 18 Russian soldiers.

=== Leadership of the Caucasus Emirate ===
On 7 October 2007, Umarov proclaimed the Imarat Kavkaz (Caucasus Emirate, aimed at uniting Northern Caucasus into a single Islamic state) and at once declared himself its Emir, thereby converting the Chechen Republic of Ichkeria into a vilayat (province) of the new emirate, which would encompass several other republics of Russian Federation. The move to establish the Emirate was quickly condemned by Akhmed Zakayev, by then until recently Umarov's own minister of foreign affairs. Zakayev, living in exile in London, called upon all separatist fighters and politicians to pledge allegiance directly to the Chechen parliament in an attempt to isolate his former subordinate from power. Zakayev expressed regret that Umarov had caved to pressure from "provocateurs" and committed a "crime" that undermines the legitimacy of the ChRI. In a one-day period two former senior field commanders, Isa Munayev and Sultan Arsayev, issued statements publicly siding with Zakayev and distancing themselves from Umarov. However, all of the prominent active field commanders in Chechnya, with the sole exception of Amir Mansur (Arbi Evmirzayev, the leader of the Islamic Jamaat of Chechnya who was killed in 2010) and some small-time commanders (such as Amir Khamza of the Islamic Brigade of Chechnya and Amir Surkho of the Staraya Sunzha Sabotage Group), had sided with Dokka Umarov on the decision.

Prominent Radio Liberty journalist Andrei Babitsky reported in November 2007 that Umarov had again travelled to Kabardino-Balkaria to rest and recuperate for the winter months. Babitsky said that Umarov was in a poor state of health after taking a fragmentation wound to his mandible (it is possible Umarov received the wound in 2006 when he broke out of a Russian encirclement on the Chechen/Ingush border) and after his leg was injured in a mine explosion. Pro-Moscow Chechen president Ramzan Kadyrov offered him medical care if Umarov were to "beg for forgiveness".

On 9 May 2009, Kadyrov claimed Umarov had been reportedly severely wounded and that four of his bodyguards were killed in an operation commanded by Kadyrov's cousin and deputy, Adam Delimkhanov. Early rumors claimed Umarov had been killed, and in June the Russian authorities forensically examined the four burned corpses to see whether they included that of Umarov. The next month, however, Umarov himself phoned the Radio Free Europe/Radio Liberty to say he is alive; and in an interview conducted in July 2009 with Prague Watchdog Umarov claimed that the last time he had been wounded was in 1995 during the First Chechen War. On 19 January 2010, Kadyrov announced that he had launched another Delimkhanov-led special operation in Chechnya's mountains to find and eliminate Umarov. Umarov's possible death was reported once again in March 2011, when Russian government said an air strike and special forces raid on a rebel base in Ingushetia killed 17 Chechen and Ingush militants including his deputy Supyan Abdullayev, but Umarov's body was not found there too.

On 1 August 2010, the Russian Islamist website Kavkaz Center claimed Umarov had officially announced his resignation for health reasons and appointed his military deputy Aslambek Vadalov as his successor. He appointed Vadalov saying "that jihad should be led by younger and more energetic commanders." Although he added that he would "continue to wage jihad and will do his utmost to help the new leadership. [Stepping down] does not mean that I give up jihad. I will do whatever I can by word and deed." On 4 August, he contradicted the claim issued by him on video saying "Due to the situation in the Caucasus I consider that it is impossible for me to quit my duties. The previous declaration is annulled. It is a falsification. I declare that my health is good to serve Allah. And I will serve the word of Allah and work to kill the enemies of Allah in all the time that he gives me to live on this earth." He called the initial video a "fabrication," but did not say why there was a conflict. Later in 2010, Vadalov and the Arab mujahid Muhannad attempted to overthrow Umarov as the leader of the Caucasus Emirate. The "supreme judge" of the group, Sayfullah and Emir Adam, the "governor of Ingushetia province", continued to support Umarov. Umarov blamed the split in the organization for Muhannad, who was killed by Russian forces in April 2011, paving the way for re-unification. In July 2011, the insurgents' supreme Islamic court ruled in favour of recognizing Umarov as the leader of the Caucasus Emirate. Amir Khamzat, the commander of the Riyad-us-Saliheen Martyr Brigade suicide battalion was named the commander of the western sector; Hussein Gakayev was named to lead the eastern sector. Vadalov and Tarkhan Gaziyev consequently followed suit and re-affirmed their allegiance to Umarov. Umarov then warned Russia that it would be the target of a new strengthened insurgency as he promised a year of "blood and tears" as a result of the new unity.

On 16 January 2014, Kadyrov claimed Umarov had been killed by Russian government forces and that his grave was being sought. On 18 March 2014, the Kavkaz Center announced Umarov had been "martyred". It reported that the Command of the Caucasus Emirate confirmed Umarov's death but did not offer further details, which might indicate his death either in battle or of natural reasons. Dagestani militant and Caucasus Emirate's qadi known as Ali Abu Mukhammad (Magomed Kebekov) was reportedly named as his successor. There was no immediate independent nor Russian federal confirmation, but it was the first time Umarov's death was reported by his supporters. In addition, Mukhammad confirmed Umarov's death in a video posted on YouTube. According to circulating rumors, Umarov might have been poisoned while visiting a rebel winter base in Chechnya during the fall 2013, or killed by an artillery strike also during that same period. The FSB's National Anti-Terrorism Committee issued the following statement: "Foreign media periodically publish information about the liquidation of Doku Umarov, but the Russian special services at this moment do not have such information and will not comment on it." On 18 July 2014, a photo showing the dead body of Umarov was published on the Instagram account of head of the Chechen Republic Ramzan Kadyrov. The photo came from a militant video showing the burial of Umarov.

== Attitudes towards targeting civilians ==
Although Umarov announced in 2006 an end to violence against civilians, three years later, in 2009, he stated he does not believe there are any civilians in Russia, but that civilian casualties would be limited as much as possible. Umarov has personally taken responsibility for attacks in which dozens of civilians have been killed, and has been implicated in others. Umarov was sought by the federal government of Russia for alleged crimes including acts of terrorism. During the 2004 Beslan school hostage crisis, Umarov had been incorrectly identified by Russian security forces and some hostages as an on-site leader of the hostage takers, a claim which was later officially refuted. Umarov himself condemned the incident.

On several occasions, Umarov firmly denied any involvement in indiscriminate attacks against civilians and questioned its legitimacy and value. In a June 2005 interview with Andrei Babitsky, he criticized Basayev for ordering the Beslan raid, saying that most of the Chechen resistance does not consider the Beslan hostage taking was a legitimate response to Russian actions in Chechnya ("if we resort to such methods, I do not think any of us will be able to retain his human face"). Umarov's controversial appointment of Basayev to the post of prime minister in 2006 was preceded by a public statement rejecting attacks against civilians as a tactic. In another statement in 2004 Umarov wrote: "Our targets are the Russian occupation forces, their military bases, command headquarters and also their local collaborationists who pursue and kill peaceful Muslims. Civil objects and innocent civilians are not our targets."

In early 2009 he was, by his own admission, personally involved in the re-activation of notorious Riyadus-Salikhin suicide formation, first set-up and led by Basayev between 1999 and 2004; in the next months a string of suicide attacks killed dozens of people (mostly police officers) and critically injured the Ingush president Yunus-bek Yevkurov, raising fears of a new campaign of attacks directed against Russian civilians. In a July 2009 interview with Prague Watchdog, when asked if people should expect a repetition of events like the Moscow hostage crisis, Umarov responded: "If that is the will of Allah. Shamil [Basayev] did not have the opportunities I have right now. […] As far as possible we will try to avoid civilian targets, but for me there are no civilians in Russia. Why? Because a genocide of our people is being carried out with their tacit consent." In December 2009, the Caucasus Emirate (via Kavkaz Center) took responsibility for the derailment of Nevsky Express, an "act of sabotage" which claimed the lives of 28 people (including government officials and Russian business executives), reportedly ordered by him personally.

In January 2010, in a statement about the upcoming "military actions", Umarov said the re-created Riyad-us-Saliheen Brigade of Martyrs will now operate in the Russian cities outside the Caucasus and "the war will come to their homes", possibly indicating the new wave of bombings such as those conducted by the group in Moscow and elsewhere in 2002–2004 under Basayev's orders. On 31 March 2010, Umarov claimed responsibility for personally ordering the Moscow Metro bombings which took the lives of 40 civilians. He warned that more attacks were to come on Russian soil because of perceived repressions of Chechnya by Prime Minister Putin. On 7 February 2011, Umarov claimed responsibility in a video posted online for ordering a suicide bombing at Domodedovo International Airport, Russia's busiest airport. The bombing killed 36 people, and was described by Umarov as a "special operation" targeting the Russian society and Putin personally. His practice of claiming responsibility for such attacks resulted in some media dubbing him "Russia's bin Laden."

On 3 February 2012, Umarov made an about-face again. In a video posted online, ordered his subordinates to halt attacks on the civilian population of Russia, while leaving military and security personnel as legitimate targets. Umarov gave this order in response to nationwide protests against the Russian government. In June 2013, however, Umarov, accompanied by his deputy Aslan Byutukayev, called for his followers in and outside the Caucasus (in particular in Tatarstan and Bashkortostan) to use "maximum force" to ensure the 2014 Sochi Winter Olympics do not take place, claiming that Russia's "barbaric actions" in the region had forced him to retaliate. Umarov said: "Today we must show those who live in the Kremlin […] that our kindness is not weakness. They plan to hold the Olympics on the bones of our ancestors, on the bones of many, many dead Muslims buried on our land by the Black Sea. We as mujahideen are required not to allow that, using any methods that Allah allows us." Russian state mass media did not report his threat, but Russia's anti-terrorist committee said it was taking measures to "protect Russian citizens" and was "paying special attention to questions of preparation for hold major sporting events of a global scale" while the Sochi 2014 Organising Committee announced that security would be a top priority.

== Legal status ==
Doku Umarov was regarded as the most-wanted man in Russia and was put by the Russian police on Interpol's international wanted list. In March 2008, Chechnya's chief prosecutor, Valery Kuznetsov, launched a criminal case against Umarov for "inciting inter-ethnic hatred and calling for the overthrow of the Russian government on the Internet" (the penalty for this being just a fine of up to 500,000 rubles and a ban on holding management positions). According to Kommersant, Umarov was earlier on Russia's wanted list, but all the previous and much more serious charges against him (involvement in acts of terrorism, kidnappings for ransom, murders and robberies) were suspended in 2005. The paper noted that the Zakayev-led Chechen separatist government in exile was investigating Umarov for "attempting to liquidate the independent Chechen state" by declaring the creation of the Caucasus Emirate. The Caucaus Emirate itself has been officially labeled by Russia as a terrorist organization since January 2010.

Since 10 March 2011, Umarov has been on the United Nations Security Council's Al-Qaida and Taliban Sanctions Committee list of individuals allegedly associated with al-Qaeda and the Taliban for "participating in the financing, planning, facilitating, preparing, or perpetrating of acts or activities by, in conjunction with, under the name of, on behalf of, or in support of, recruiting for, supplying, selling or transferring arms and related materiel to and otherwise supporting acts or activities of" his own organizations (the Caucasus Emirate and its Brigade of Martyrs suicide attack wing) as well as Uzbekistan's Islamic Jihad Union and the Islamic Movement of Uzbekistan.

The United States government offered $5 million for information leading to Umarov's capture since May 2011 on the grounds of his hostility to U.S. interests. The reward was announced in a joint statement of U.S. President Barack Obama and Russian President Dmitry Medvedev on cooperation in counterterrorism. U.S. Assistant Secretary of State for Public Affairs Philip J. Crowley also published a statement stating that "the action taken today against Umarov supports the U.S. effort to degrade Umarov's ability to exert operational and leadership control over Caucasus Emirates [sic]. We are determined to eliminate the group's ability to direct violent attacks and to disrupt, dismantle, and defeat Umarov's network."

On 8 April 2014, the director of the Russian Federal Security Service Alexander Bortnikov confirmed the earlier announcement of Kavkaz Center made on 18 March of the same year about Umarov's death.

Umarov was removed from the US State Department's Rewards for Justice list in April 2014. According to the website, "Suspects may be removed from the RFJ list for a variety of reasons, including when they are taken into custody by law enforcement or security forces, or are confirmed dead by an official authoritative source."

== Religious beliefs and world views ==
"Barely religious until late in life", Umarov used to be known as practitioner of the region's "traditional Islam", as opposed to "Wahhabis". In 2006, responding to Russian claims that he was an Islamic extremist, he described himself as a "traditionalist" and said:

"Before the start of the first war in 1994, when the occupation began and I understood that war was inevitable, I came here as a patriot. I'm not even sure I knew how to pray properly then. It's ridiculous to say I'm a Wahhabist or a radical Muslim."

Umarov denied that Chechen separatism is linked to al-Qaeda or any other international jihadi groups, saying that the rebels' priority is liberty and independence from Russia and peace for the Caucasus. Prior to his 2007 declaration of the Caucasus Emirate, Umarov was commonly viewed as a staunch Chechen nationalist and had been expected to rather curb the pan-Islamist tendencies in the Chechen separatist movement.

In the same 2007 statement in which Umarov proclaimed his Emirate, he expressed solidarity with "brothers in Afghanistan, Iraq, Somalia and Palestine" and described not only Russia but "everyone who attacked Muslims" and "wages war against Muslims" as an enemy. His deputy Anzor Astemirov later recalled how Umarov told them that "of course we must rely on Allah, not on England, not on America, not on the West, not on anyone except Allah, and we must get rid of all these delusions." In the video in which Umarov claimed responsibility for the Domodedovo International Airport bombing, he criticized the United States and Russia as hypocrites for not following their own principles and surrendering world power to China due to the senior status of Chinese culture. In March 2013, Umarov urged the Chechen diaspora members to not get involved in the Syrian civil war and instead to join his forces in the North Caucasus. The ideology that Umarov espoused from the declaration of the Caucasus Emirate until his death would describe him as a Salafist-Takfiri jihadist.

Political offices
Preceded by Declaration of Emirate	Emir of the Caucasus Emirate; 2007–2014	Succeeded by Ali Abu Mukhammad
Preceded by Sheikh Abdul Halim	President of the Chechen Republic of Ichkeria; 2006–2007	Succeeded by Position Abolished (Prime Minister in Exile: Akhmed Zakayev)
