= Tarkhan Gaziyev =

Chechen military commander

Personal details
- Born: 11 November 1965 (age 60) Pozh-Poroy, Chechen–Ingush ASSR, Soviet Union

Military service
- Allegiance: Caucasus Emirate/Katiba Abd Ar-Rahman
- Commands: Southwest Front of the Armed Forces of the Chechen Republic of Ichkeria Raisa Mukhabarat
- Battles/wars: Second Chechen War; North Caucasus Insurgency

Tarkhan Ismailovich Gaziyev (Russian: Тарха́н Исмаи́лович Гази́ев; born 11 November 1965), also known as Emir Tarkhan, is a Chechen militant commander who has fought in the Insurgency in the North Caucasus. The United States Department of State added Gaziyev to its list of Specially Designated Global Terrorists on 29 September 2015.

== Rebel activity ==
Gaziyev was born on 11 November 1965 in the small village of Pozh-Poroy in the mountainous Itum-Kale district of the former Chechen–Ingush Autonomous Soviet Socialist Republic. During the Second Chechen War, Gaziyev held a number of top military positions in Chechnya's armed underground resistance, commanding a squad of several dozen militants that operated mainly in the Achkoi-Martan district.

Officially wanted by federal authorities since 14 May 2004, Gaziyev has established his rebel credentials by carrying out an array of attacks on Russian security forces and local pro-Moscow authorities, including:

- The murder of the Chairman of the Council of Elders of the Itum-Kale district in the village of Abugroi.
- An attack on both a school building and the house of the school's head of administration in the village of Gukhoy in the Itum-Kale district; the administration head's nephew was killed and four policemen were wounded in the attack.
- Leading twenty militants in an assault on the village of Alkhazurovo which killed four police officers and one soldier on 19 March 2008.
- A series of armed raids in several villages within the Achkoi-Martan and Urus-Martan districts on 20–21 April 2008.

Virtually every insurgent operation conducted in the Itum-Kale district from 2002–2011, as well as all operations undertaken in the Achkoi-Martan district from 2007-2011 are alleged to be attributable to Gaziyev; altogether, he has led sub-units on dozens of missions in the past decade. He was said to be held in great respect by fellow fighters for his courage, military skills and depth of faith.

Gaziyev was named commander of the Southwest Front of the Armed Forces of the Chechen Republic of Ichkeria by rebel leader Dokka Umarov on 24 September 2006, and was later appointed head of the National Security Service at the beginning of March 2007. Following the formation of the Caucasus Emirate in the fall of 2007, the entity was renamed "Raisa Mukhabarat" (security service), and Gaziyev retained his post; however, Umarov revoked Gaziyev's title following a summer 2010 leadership dispute.

== Split with Dokka Umarov ==
The first public disagreement between Gaziyev and Umarov occurred in 2008 when Gaziyev refused to carry out an order to assassinate respected Chechen commander and Islamic scholar Arbi Yovmirzaev (Emir Mansur), who had publicly condemned Umarov's pronouncement of the Caucasus Emirate.

Later, in September 2010, Gaziyev appeared on video alongside fellow field commanders Khuseyn Gakayev and Aslambek Vadalov; in the clip, they denounced Umarov and declared Gakayev the leader of the re-organized Chechen resistance. The genesis of the dispute was over the precise vision of an independent state in the North Caucasus as well as Umarov's allegedly autocratic leadership style; in siding with Gakayev and Vadalov, as well as the Saudi-born Muhannad (whom Umarov would accuse of fomenting dissent within the insurgency ranks in tandem with Gaziyev), Gaziyev had "opted for moderate radicals with views closer to traditional Chechen nationalists." The fact that Gaziyev had sided with the Chechen nationalists was considered a huge blow to Umarov's power and credibility; numerous middle- and lower-ranking militant leaders departed with the four veteran field commanders, putting Umarov in an increasingly isolated position. In response, Umarov stripped Gakayev, Vadalov, Gaziyev, and Muhannad of their titles and appointments.

In video statements released in October 2010, Gakayev, Vadalov and Gaziyev explained their motives for breaking away from Umarov, with Gaziyev noting that "there is no one who has been at his side longer than we have, or who knows him better than we do.... We thought about this for a long time, we prayed to Allah so as not to destroy the accord among fighters." Gaziyev would also define the goals of the Chechen nationalists as "cleansing our country of the enemies of Allah, establishing Sharia law to defend the poor and disadvantaged, and bringing up our future generation in the Muslim faith."

A July 2011 Sharia Court proceeding about the discord conducted by the Caucasus Emirate in Chechnya would lead to a ruling in favor of Umarov; as a result of the trial, numerous Chechen commanders who withdrew their oaths of allegiance to him instead re-affirmed their loyalty to the Emir of the Caucasus Emirate. Among them were Gakayev and Vadalov, but apparently not Gaziyev.

On 23 July 2011, the rebel website Kavkaz Center stated that a ruling by the Caucasus Emirate's Sharia Court had resolved the nearly year-long dispute between the transnational Islamists led by Umarov and a significant segment of the more localized, traditional anti-Russian Chechen irredentists led by Gakayev. Following the month-long court proceedings, Umarov re-appointed Gakayev his naib (deputy) in the eastern sector of Chechnya, while Vadalov and "a number" of Chechen field commanders who had earlier renounced their bayat (allegiance) instead renewed their loyalty to Umarov. Noticeably absent from the gathering was Gaziyev, and an appeal from Umarov to "mujaheds in the North Caucasus and Chechnya...to put behind [you] all the disagreements that existed between us and direct all your strength, all your will toward elevating the word of Allah and [against] our enemy the unbelievers," implied that some Chechen fighters, possibly including Gaziyev and the men he commands, still refuse to acknowledge Umarov's title of supreme commander. In naming Aslan Byutukaev (Emir Khamzat) commander of the western sector of Chechnya, Umarov also abolished the southwestern front previously run by Gaziyev until his dismissal in the fall of 2010, further evidence that Gaziyev is not presently a part of the reconciliation.

On 23 April 2012, Radio Free Europe/Radio Liberty speculated that the most logical reason for Gazyiev's absence from the meeting was that his fighters staged 14 or 15 attacks in the uplands southwest of Grozny between mid-April and late-June 2011.

Gazyiev gave an interview with the Chechen service of Radio Liberty in mid 2014, where he confirmed rumours that he had left Chechnya; however, he expressed a desire to return to Chechnya's mountains.

In October 2016, Gaziyev was reportedly arrested in Turkey.

Gaziyev has a group of Chechens in Syria loyal to him, known as "Tarkhan's Jamaat" or "Katiba Abd Ar-Rahman", who have been in Syria since 2013 and have fought alongside Muslim Shishani in Hama Governorate. They have also fought independently in Kessab, Latakia Governorate in 2014.
