= Zalim Shebzukhov =

North Caucasian militant (1986–2016)

Zalim Borisovich Shebzukhov
- Залим Борисович Шебзухов

Personal details
- Born: 6 October 1986 Kabardino-Balkarian ASSR, Russian SFSR, Soviet Union
- Died: 17 August 2016 (aged 29) Saint Petersburg, Russia

Military service
- Battles/wars: Insurgency in the North Caucasus; Insurgency in Kabardino-Balkaria and Karachay-Cherkessia

Emir of the Caucasus Emirate
- Емир на Кавказката емирство

Zalim Borisovich Shebzukhov (Russian: Залим Борисович Шебзухов; 6 October 1986 – 17 August 2016) was a North Caucasian Islamist from Kabardino-Balkaria, North Caucasus, and a leader of the Caucasus Emirate militant group.

== Biography ==
Zalim was imprisoned for two years, after his arrest on 7 December 2007. On 24 June 2009 he was released. Shortly after, Zalim joined the Caucasus Emirate. On 16 April 2015 the National Anti-Terrorist Committee announced his death during a special operation in Nalchik, but soon after the committee informed the media that they were mistaken and it was another militant (Zaur Prokopchuk) that was killed during that action. On 10 November 2015 Russian special forces announced the death of top federal fugitive Robert Zankishiev, who led the militants of Kabardino-Balkaria. On 28 December 2015 Zalim replaced Robert as head of Kabardino-Balkaria's terrorist organization and soon his organization became part of Caucasus Emirate.

== Death ==
For a time, his fate (and his location) were unknown until Saint Petersburg Police received information that Zalim might be hiding in the city. He was killed by Russian security forces, along with Astemir Sheriev and Vyacheslav Nyrov, during a raid on Zalim's apartment in Saint-Petersburg, in August 2016.

Political offices
Preceded by Magomed Suleimanov	Emir of the Caucasus Emirate; 2015–2016	Succeeded by vacant
