= 2007 Shatoy Mi-8 crash =

Aviation incident in Russia

Coordinates: 43°24′N 45°43′E

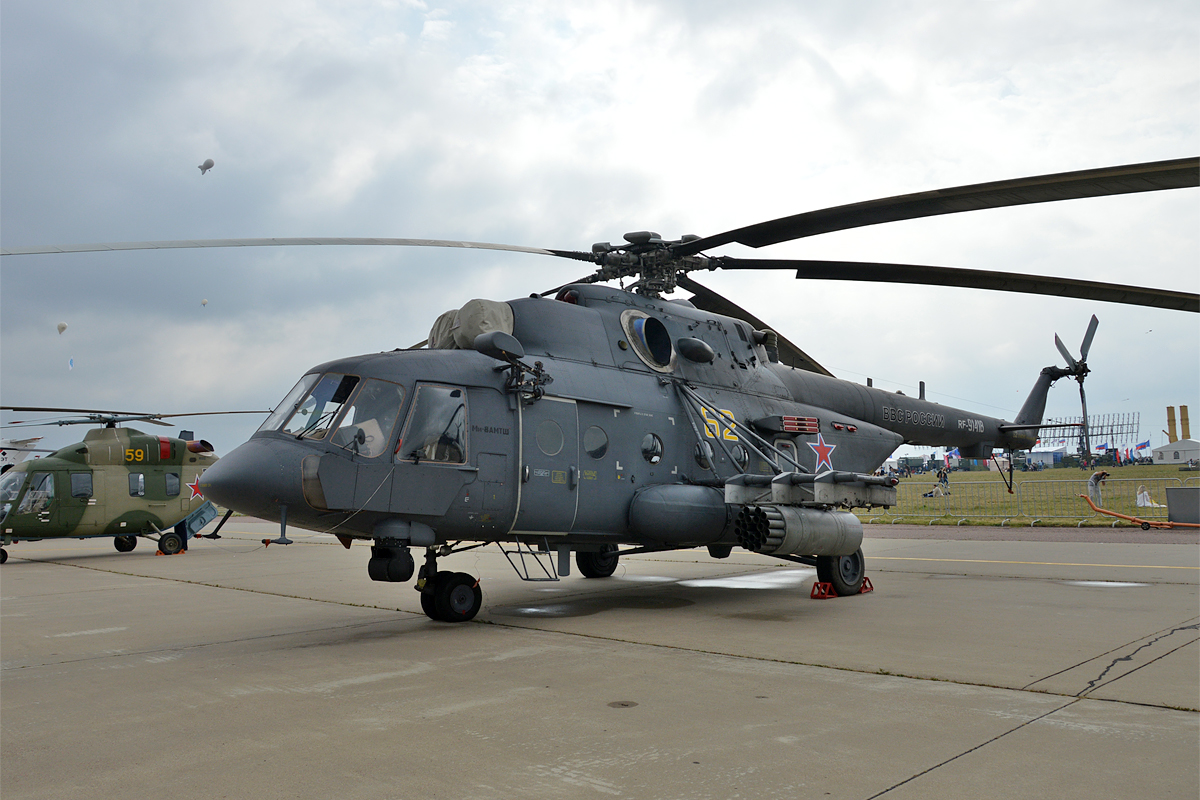
- A Russian Mil-Mi-8 similar to the aircraft involved in the incident.

Occurrence
- Date: April 27, 2007
- Summary: Pilot error
- Site: Near Shatoy, Chechnya, Russia

Aircraft
- Aircraft type: Mil Mi-8
- Operator: Russian Air Force
- Registration: 65-gray
- Occupants: 20
- Passengers: 17
- Crew: 3
- Fatalities: 20
- Survivors: 0

The 2007 Shatoy Mi-8 crash occurred on April 27, 2007, when a Russian Armed Forces Mil Mi-8 helicopter carrying special forces troops and officers crashed in mountainous terrain in southern Chechnya, killing all 20 people on board.

The incident is the largest officially acknowledged loss of life for federal troops in Chechnya in 2007 and the worst Russian military aircraft disaster since August 2002, when an enormous Mil Mi-26 transport helicopter packed with troops crashed into a minefield after being hit by a missile, killing 127 soldiers.

== Crash ==
The crashed helicopter was one of three Mi-8 transports and two Mil Mi-24 attack helicopters of the Russian Air Force which lifted off from a helipad to the east of the city of Gudermes. It was carrying 15 GRU Spetsnaz Rostov Oblast Brigade recon commandos and two high-ranking Russian military officers from the main Russian military base at Khankala in Chechnya.

Russian officials initially claimed the helicopter was downed by small arms fire from Chechen separatists. Chechen authorities cited mechanical fault as a cause of the crash. A special commission tasked with investigating the crash eventually determined that the most likely cause was human error.

== Background ==
The two officers on board as passengers—a Lieutenant Colonel and a Major—were to serve as liaison officers to ethnic Chechen troops who had, according to federal sources, spotted a group of up to 15 Chechen separatists near the southern village of Shatoy. These allied Chechens had reportedly asked for federal assistance and air support. According to the separatist account, the pro-Russian troops were ambushed by separatist fighters who inflicted heavy losses on them.

On April 28, 2007, Russian officials asserted that at least three rebels were killed during a ground operation near the crash site, while Russian media reported five soldiers, including two Russian Ministry of Internal Affairs (MVD) servicemen, died in the fighting. At the same the separatists, reportedly led by Dokka Umarov and Ramzan Saluyev, claimed to have killed 30-50 soldiers on the ground and 20-30 airborne soldiers, compared to their own claimed losses of two fighters killed and several wounded.
