= Tarkhan's Jamaat =

Rebel group that fought in the Syrian Civil War

Tarkhan's Jamaat Katibat Abd al-Rahman
- Leader: Umar Shishan
- Dates active: 2014-2018
- Active regions: Hama Governorate, Syria; Idlib Governorate, Syria; Latakia Governorate, Syria
- Wars: Syrian Civil War

Tarkhan's Jamaat, named after Chechen militant Tarkhan Gaziyev, is a rebel group that fought in the Syrian Civil War. The group is also known as Katibat Abd al-Rahman.

== History ==
The group is loyal towards Tarkhan Gaziyev.

== See also ==
- List of armed groups in the Syrian Civil War
