= Vilayat Cherkessia =

Province of the Caucasus Emirate

- Flag of the Caucasus Emirate
- Leader: Unknown
- Dates active: 7 October 2007 – 2017
- Part of: Caucasus Emirate
- Wars: the Second Chechen War, Insurgency in the North Caucasus

Vilayat Cherkessia was a vilayat (province) of the Caucasus Emirate, made up of Adygea and the southern part of Krasnodar Krai existing from 2007 to 2017. The group came to light during the 2014 Sochi Olympics, due to the threat of attacks. However, it never carried out any military operations during its entire existence.
