= Said Buryatsky =

Russian Islamist

- Born: Alexander Alexandrovitch Tikhomirov; 10 February 1982; Ulan-Ude, Russian SFSR, Soviet Union
- Died: 2 March 2010 (aged 28); Ekazhevo, Ingushetia, Russia
- Military career
- Allegiance: Caucasus Emirate
- Commands: Riyad-us Saliheen Brigade of Martyrs
- Conflicts: Insurgency in Ingushetia; Insurgency in the North Caucasus

Said Buryatsky (10 February 1982 – 2 March 2010) was an Islamist militant leader in the North Caucasus. Buryatsky had been among the most-wanted men in Russia, and he was considered an ideologue leader of the Islamist terrorists in Chechnya and southern Russia. He was known in the region as a Russian counterpart of Osama bin Laden. Buryatsky had been identified in YouTube videos, wearing camouflage while preaching radical Islam with an assault rifle.

== Biography ==
Buryatsky, whose birth name was Alexander Alexandrovitch Tikhomirov, was born February 10, 1982, in Ulan-Ude, the capital of Buryatia. His father was a Buryat, and his mother was a Russian. Raised as Buddhist, he reportedly converted to Islam at the age of 15. He studied at a Muslim theological institute in Orenburg, run by one of Russia's official Muslim Spiritual Boards, and then, from 2002-2005, studied in Cairo and Kuwait.

Buryatsky moved to the North Caucasus in late 2007 or early 2008, where he became an important ideologue of the Caucasus Emirate. He criticized Sufi Muslims, critics of the Emirate, and spoke out against the commanders who disagreed with Dokka Umarov.

Buryatsky was reportedly responsible for the reactivation of the Riyadus-Salikhin shahid brigade of suicide bombers originally formed by Chechen field commander Shamil Basayev. He was being investigated for involvement with the 2009 Nevsky Express bombing, leaving 28 dead and 90 wounded; however, he was never brought to trial.

On March 2, 2010, Buryatsky was killed in the village of Ekazhevo in Ingushetia, during a Russian military operation involving units of the Federal Security Service (FSB) and the Russian Interior Ministry. A spokesman said that FSB troops had found a bomb factory inside the same house where the militants had been cornered in Ingushetia.
