= Congress of the Peoples of Ichkeria and Dagestan =

Islamist terrorist organization

- Конгресс народов Ичкерии и Дагестана
- Flag of the Congress of the Peoples of Ichkeria and Dagestan
- Leaders: Shamil Basayev; Movladi Udugov
- Dates active: 1998–2002
- Group: Islamic International Brigade
- Headquarters: Grozny, Chechnya
- Active regions: Chechnya; Dagestan
- Ideology: Islamic fundamentalism Separatism
- Part of: Islamic Djamaat of Dagestan
- Wars: War of Dagestan

The Congress of the Peoples of Ichkeria and Dagestan (Russian: Конгресс народов Ичкерии и Дагестана; abbreviated CPID) was an Islamist terrorist organization under the joint control of Chechen and Dagestani rebel leaders with the support of foreign Arab mercenaries, founded in 1998. One of its subordinates was the Islamic International Brigade, a mujahideen movement that was a major combatant in the War of Dagestan. The objective of the CPID was to establish an Islamic caliphate in the North Caucasus.
