= Aslambek Vadalov =

Chechen military commander

2nd Emir of the Caucasus Emirate (Disputed)
- In office 1 August 2010 – 3 or 13 August 2010 (disputed)
- Preceded by: Doku Umarov
- Succeeded by: Doku Umarov

Personal details
- Born: 3 April 1972 (age 54) Ishkoy-Yurt, Gudermes Chechen–Ingush Autonomous Soviet Socialist Republic, Russian SFSR, Soviet Union

Military service
- Allegiance: Mujahideen in Chechnya; Caucasus Emirate
- Commands: Commander of the Gudermes Region; Deputy Commander of the Eastern Front
- Battles/wars: First Chechen War; Second Chechen War; North Caucasus Insurgency

Aslambek Ilimsultanovich Vadalov (Russian: Асламбек Илимсултанович Вадалов; born 3 April 1972), also known by his nom de guerre Emir Aslambek, is a Chechen rebel leader fighting in the North Caucasus. He was appointed the supreme leader of the Caucasus Emirate on 1 August 2010, though this was later retracted.

== Early life ==
Aslambek Vadalov was born in 1972 and is a native of Ishkoy-Yurt, a village in the eastern portion of Chechnya's Gudermes. Vadalov also seems to have spent much of his youth in the Gudermes region, though some reports have suggested that he studied for a short period of time in Moscow in the late 1980s, perhaps at a technical institute.

== Chechen War and rebel army ==
Following the outbreak of the First Chechen War in 1994, Vadalov joined the separatist fighters from Gudermes; he may have served in the unit of Sheik Fathi, a Chechen who had lived in Jordan and engaged in Islamist conflicts in Afghanistan and Tajikistan. It has been postulated that if Vadalov did indeed serve alongside Fathi, it would indicate a very early exposure to the Islamist interpretation of the war in Chechnya.

Though Vadalov played no role in the 1999 Dagestan incursion led by Shamil Basayev and Ibn al-Khattab, following Russia's re-invasion of Chechnya that autumn he joined Khattab's Arab Mujahideen in Chechnya. After engaging in the battles for Argun and Gudermes, Vadalov's unit withdrew to the mountainous districts of Vedeno and Nozhay-Yurt in order to launch guerrilla attacks on Russian security forces.

In 2000, Vadalov returned to Ishkoy-Yurt for unknown reasons and joined a small, local guerrilla force; the unit operated both independently and in cooperation with other rebel formations, including taking part in the 17 September 2001 attack on Gudermes. The next few years saw the separatist movement incur significant losses, but Vadalov was able to distinguish himself mainly due to his survival skills. As such, he was named Deputy Commander of the Gudermes Region of the Chechen Armed Forces under Emir Askhab. Although this unit that he commanded lacked manpower, his team and he were able to launch multiple small but significant attacks against the Russian security forces, especially around Ishkoy-Yurt.

Following Emir Askhab's death in early 2005, Vadalov was named Commander of the Gudermes region. However, while a capable small-unit commander, Vadalov struggled when in control of a larger fighting force that required a broader strategic perspective. His unit was eventually driven out of Gudermes proper and forced back into the highlands of Vedeno and Nozhay-Yurt. Despite these setbacks, he still maintained a reputation for "commitment to the cause and hard-fought guerrilla operations." He has been fighting with the Caucasus Emirate rebels against Russian forces since 1994 and was apparently one of the first to swear allegiance to Doku Umarov in 2007. Caucasus Emirate was formed 2007. He was fighting for independent Chechnya until 2007.

His relationship with Amir Khattab is of significance. Previously he was the commander of the Eastern Front of the Armed Forces of the Caucasus Emirate, although in practice he was commanding a force of perhaps about 30-50 militants on the Ingushetian border.

== Ideology ==
Akhmed Zakayev said Vadalov had been announced as the new Emir of the Caucasus Emirate because of a "loss of confidence among his (Umarov's) subordinates. [The] Methods of Dokku Umarov, including attacks against civilians, were not supported by militants." He also said that Vadalov "is a supporter of other views and is not affected by ideologists of Wahhabism." The Russian paper Kommersant had reported that Zakayev, sentenced to death by the Sharia Court of the Caucasus Emirate, had plans to establish contacts with Vadalov.

== Appointment as "Emir of the Caucasus Emirate" ==
On 1 August 2010 the "state web site" of the Caucasus Emirate, Kavkaz Center reported that Doku Umarov had stepped down from his position as Emir of the Caucasus Emirate and appointed Vadalov to become his successor. On the video containing the announcement Umarov states that "jihad should be led by younger and more energetic commanders." However, when the Kavkaz Center site was restored on-line after a "service break" on 3 August 2010, the original announcement had been replaced by one which stated, that Umarov only "proposed to appoint" Vadalov his successor. A few days later Umarov said he had no intention of stepping down and called the video announcing his resignation a fabrication.

On August 13, 2010 Kavkaz Center announced that Aslambek Vadalov had resigned from his post of Deputy Military Emir of the Caucasus Emirate.

=== Rift with Umarov ===
Days after Umarov rescinded his resignation, Vadalov was said to have renounced adherence of an oath given to Umarov; however it was said that while he ceases subordination to Umarov, he would remain loyal to the larger Caucasus Emirate.

In July 2011, a sharia court ruled in favour of Umarov to close the rift caused by Umarov's reorganisation of the armed forces of Chechnya, the disbanding the so-called "eastern and south-western fronts" and dividing Chechnya into "military sectors." The court asked the rebels to re-swear allegiance to Umarov. Amir Khamzat, the commander of the Riyad-us Saliheen Brigade of Martyrs or the organisation's suicide battalion who has been named the commander of the western sector. Hussein Gakayev, who had been named to lead the eastern sector, Aslambek Vadalov and Tarkhan Gaziev consequently followed suit and re-affirmed their allegiance to Umarov.

== Later events ==
In November 2016, Vadalov was reportedly arrested in Turkey, but was later released.
