= Hanna Yablonska =

Ukrainian playwright and poet

Anna Yablonskaya
- Born: Anna Hryhorivna Yablonskaya; July 20, 1981; Odessa, Ukrainian SSR, Soviet Union
- Died: January 24, 2011 (aged 29); Domodedovo International Airport, Moscow, Russia
- Education: International law
- Alma mater: Odesa National Law Academy
- Occupations: Playwright, poet
- Spouse: Artem Mashutin
- Children: Maria Mashutina (b. 2007)
- Writing career
- Language: Russian
- Notable work: Pagans
- Notable awards: Iskusstvo Kino (Pagans)
- Website: silkhat.livejournal.com

Hanna Hryhorivna Mashutina (Ukrainian: Га́нна Григо́рівна Машу́тіна; July 20, 1981 – January 24, 2011), known under her pseudonyms Anna Yablonskaya (Russian: А́нна Ябло́нская) or Hanna Yablonska (Ukrainian: Га́нна Ябло́нська), was a Ukrainian playwright and poet, and one of the victims of the 2011 Domodedovo International Airport bombing, a suicide bombing.

== Profile ==
Yablonska was born in Odessa, Ukrainian SSR (now Ukraine). Under the pseudonym Anna Yablonskaya (Russian: Анна Яблонская) she published over a dozen Russian-language playscripts. Many of them were staged at venues in Russia, in particular, in St. Petersburg. Since 2004 Yablonska received several awards in different literary and dramatic events in Russia (Moscow, Yekaterinburg) and Belarus (Minsk). She also wrote a series of lyrical poems.

On January 24, 2011, Yablonska arrived at Domodedovo International Airport in Moscow on a flight from Odesa, Ukraine to attend the presentation ceremony as one of the 2010 winners of the award established by the Cinema Art magazine. She was subsequently killed when a suicide vest or improvised explosive device detonated in the international baggage-claim area.
