= 2002 Grozny truck bombing =

2002 incident in Grozny, Chechnya

Coordinates: 43.32734°N 45.67517°E

2002 Grozny bombing
- Map of Chechen Republic
- Location: Grozny, Chechnya (Russia)
- Date: 27 December 2002
- Target: Chechen government HQ
- Attack type: Car bombs
- Deaths: 83
- Injuries: 210
- Perpetrator: Riyad-us Salihiin

The Grozny truck bombing occurred on 27 December 2002, when three Chechen suicide bombers ran vehicles into the heavily guarded republic's government headquarters in the regional capital Grozny.

== Details ==
The drivers of two vehicles reportedly wore federal military uniforms and carried official passes which allowed them through three successive military checkpoints on their way to the headquarters building. A guard at the fourth and final checkpoint attempted to inspect the vehicles, and began firing on the vehicles as they drove through the checkpoint towards the building.

The explosion by the equivalent of a ton of dynamite brought down the roof and floors of the four-story building. The first reports mentioned as few as two dead. Ultimately, Chechen officials said 83 people were killed (48 on the spot) and 210 were injured. Several Chechen administration officials were injured in the attack, including Deputy Prime Minister Zina Batyzheva (seriously wounded) and Chechen Security Council Secretary Rudnik Dudayev. The head of the pro-Russian administration in Chechnya, Akhmad Kadyrov, and his Prime Minister, Mikhail Babich, were not in the building at the time.

== Responsibility ==
Colonel Ilya Shabalkin, spokesman for the joint federal forces in Chechnya, said the bombing was organized by Chechen rebel field commanders Abu al-Walid and Shamil Basayev. Basayev claimed responsibility for the planning and execution of the attack, saying that he personally detonated the bomb by remote control.

Some news reports called the attack an act of terrorism, which with 83 confirmed fatalities, would have been the deadliest terrorist attack in Chechnya. Others described the attackers as militants and rebels and not terrorists.
