= Domodedovo International Airport bombing =

2011 suicide bombing in a Moscow airport

Coordinates: 55°24′31″N 37°54′22″E

- Part of Insurgency in the North Caucasus, Terrorism in Russia and Islamic terrorism in Europe
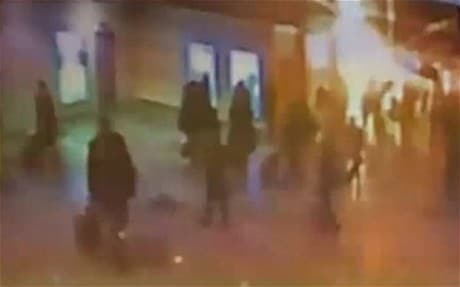
- A closed-circuit television camera still of the explosion
- Location: Domodedovo Airport; Domodedovsky District, Moscow Oblast, Russia
- Date: 24 January 2011; 16:32 MSK (UTC+03:00)
- Target: Domodedovo Airport
- Attack type: Suicide bombing
- Weapon: Improvised explosive device
- Deaths: 37 (including the bomber)
- Injuries: 173
- Perpetrators: Caucasus Emirate; Riyad-us Saliheen Brigade

The Domodedovo International Airport bombing was a suicide bombing in the international arrival hall of Moscow Domodedovo Airport, in Domodedovsky District, Moscow Oblast, on 24 January 2011.

The bombing killed 37 people and injured 173 others, including 86 who had to be hospitalised. Of the casualties, 31 died at the scene, three later in hospitals, one en route to a hospital, one on 2 February after having been put in a coma, and another on 24 February after being hospitalised in grave condition.

Russia's Federal Investigative Committee later identified the suicide bomber as a 20-year-old from the North Caucasus, and said that the attack was aimed "first and foremost" at foreign citizens.

== Background ==
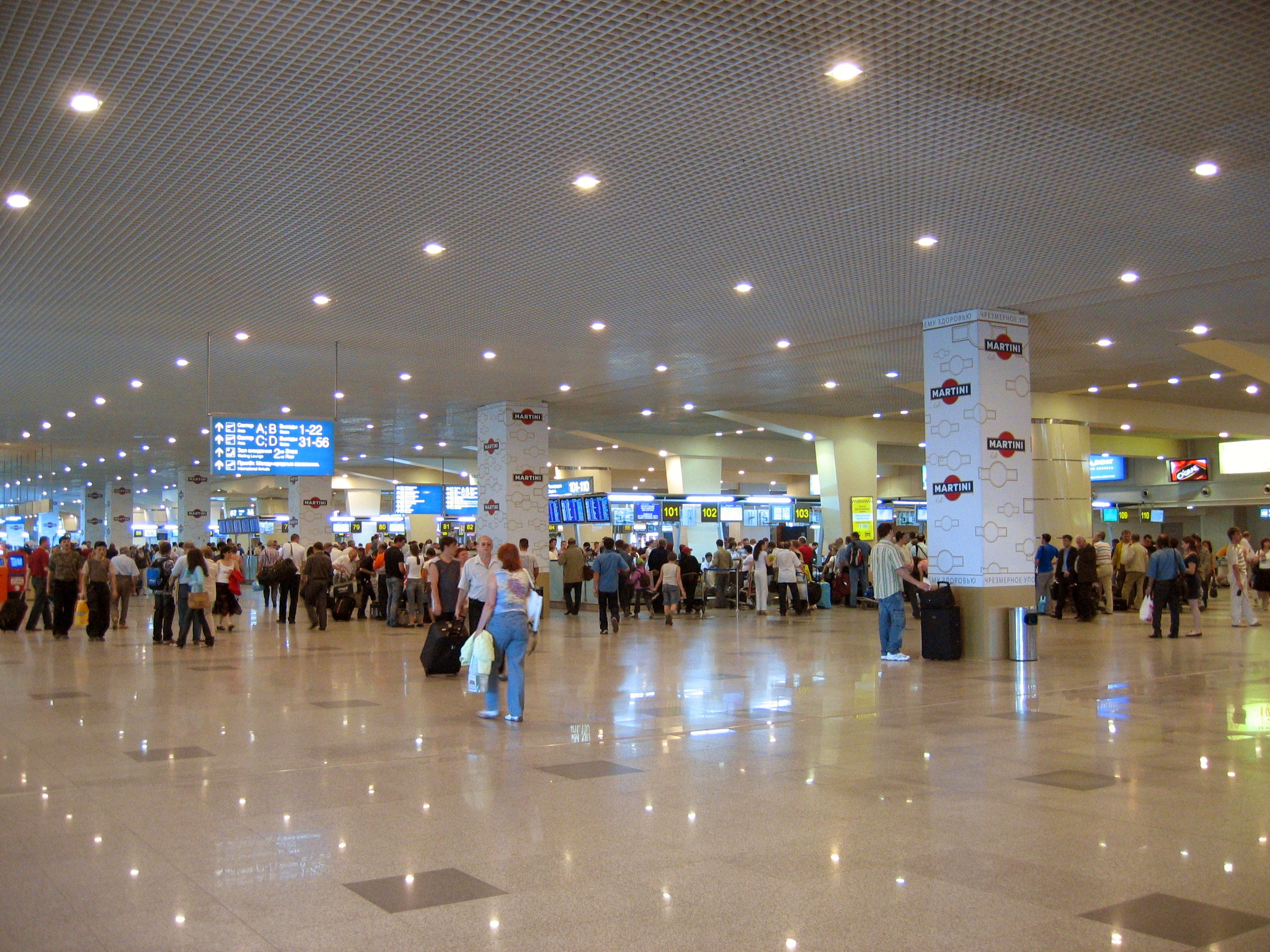
Domodedovo Airport passenger terminal in 2007

Moscow Domodedovo Airport is located 42 kilometres (26 mi) southeast of central Moscow and is Russia's second largest airport, with over 22 million passengers passing through in 2010. It is heavily used by foreign workers and tourists.

In 2004, two aircraft which had just taken off from Domodedovo were bombed by female Chechen suicide bombers.

The city of Moscow had seen a number of significant bomb attacks in the years prior to the incident. In 2004, two separate attacks on the Moscow Metro, one by a male suicide bomber on 6 February and another by a female suicide bomber on 31 August, killed a total of 51 people; in 2006, 13 people were killed in a market bombing; and in March 2010, 40 people were killed in further suicide bombings on the Moscow Metro.

== Bombing ==
The explosion affected the baggage-claim area of the airport's international arrivals hall. Some reports have suggested that the explosion was the work of a suicide bomber, with investigators saying the explosion was caused by an "improvised device packed with shrapnel, pieces of chopped wire" and the force equivalent to between two and five kilograms of TNT. Russia's chief investigator has stated the explosion was the work of terrorists. Investigators found a male head and believed it might have been that of the suicide bomber.

According to Russian newspaper accounts, the bombing was carried out by two suicide bombers, a man and a woman. Another three accomplices who had kept their distance from the blast were sought, but the source of the attack remained unclear. Security experts speculated that the attackers may have been Islamist militants from the North Caucasus, though this was not confirmed. The attack may have been an act of revenge for recent anti-militant operations, including the killing of Pakhrudin Gadzhiyev in Dagestan the previous Friday. Gadzhiyev was suspected of organizing suicide attacks in 2010.

== Victims ==
Dead and injured by country
| Country | Dead | Injured |
|---|---|---|
| Russia | 29 | 57 |
| Austria | 2 | |
| Germany | 1 | 1 |
| Tajikistan | 1 | 8 |
| Kyrgyzstan | 1 | |
| Uzbekistan | 1 | 1 |
| United Kingdom | 1 | |
| Ukraine | 1 | |
| Nigeria | | 2 |
| Slovakia | | 2 |
| France | | 1 |
| Italy | | 1 |
| Moldova | | 1 |
| Serbia | | 1 |
| Slovenia | | 1 |
| Citizenship undisclosed | | 39 |
| Total | 37 | 173 |

The first identified casualty was 29-year-old Ukrainian playwright Anna Yablonskaya, author of more than a dozen plays. Half an hour before the explosion, Yablonskaya had arrived on a flight from her native city of Odesa to receive an award at a ceremony for young playwrights established by Cinema Art magazine.

On 25 January, the Ministry of Emergency Situations (EMERCOM) published the list of casualties. Twenty-six out of 35 dead were identified.

According to Vladimir Markin, a representative of the Russian Federation Investigative Committee, two British citizens died in the blast, however, the BBC in a later article mentioned only one British citizen among the dead, as well as one German citizen. Gordon Cousland, an analyst for CACI, was confirmed to be a British citizen, while another victim, Kirill Bodrashov, who had been listed as a British citizen by EMERCOM, was a Russian citizen who lived in London for several years. The Bulgarian Ministry of Foreign Affairs reported that a Bulgarian man was among the casualties; however, it was later clarified that the ethnic Bulgarian who had died in the blast actually had Austrian citizenship.

According to the Slovak embassy in Moscow, Slovak actress Zuzana Fialová and Slovak actor Ľuboš Kostelný were injured in the blast.

== Aftermath ==
A number of flights originally bound for Domodedovo were redirected to Moscow's Vnukovo International Airport following the attack. Russian authorities directed all of the country's airports to immediately begin inspecting all visitors before allowing them to enter the airports. However, this practice was ruled illegal by an appellate court in June 2011. The express commuter trains that run from Domodedovo to the city were operating free of charge. The trains from other Moscow airports, where flights originally scheduled to land at Domodedovo were diverted to, were also running free of charge.

At Domodedovo, the surge of emergency vehicles caused public transportation delays. In response, citizens volunteered to carpool passengers to Moscow, and taxi drivers slashed their rates.

The blast was followed by a drop of almost two percent at the Moscow stock exchange (MICEX).

== Responsibility ==
On 8 February 2011, a faction of the Caucasus Emirate led by Doku Umarov claimed responsibility for the attack, and threatened further attacks. In the video in which Doku Umarov claimed responsibility for the bombing, he took the opportunity to lash out, calling the major powers in the world "satanic". He criticised the US and Russia for being hypocrites, reasoning that if they actually followed their own principles, they would have to surrender world power to China, due to the senior status of Chinese culture and religion. He said, according to the logic of Russia and America, "China should then rule the world. They have the largest and most ancient cultures". He also attacked the US, Russia, Britain, and Israel for oppressing Muslims.

== Investigation ==
In the aftermath of the explosion, Russia's Investigative Committee stated that the bombing was aimed "first and foremost" at foreign citizens, adding that "it was by no means an accident that the act of terror was committed in the international arrivals hall".

On 7 February 2011, Russian officials identified the suspected suicide bomber as 20-year-old Magomed Yevloyev, born in the village of Ali-Yurt, Ingushetia (not to be confused with the journalist of the same name killed in 2008).

Magomed Yevloyev's 16-year-old sister Fatima Yevloyeva and friend Umar Aushev were suspected of collaboration in the Domodedovo attack and detained in February 2011. They were released a few months later, but remained under investigation for illegal possession of firearms. In September, Yevloyeva and Aushev were no longer considered suspects, and were cleared of all charges.

In February and March 2011, Russian law enforcement agencies conducted special operations against members of the Caucasus Emirate in Ingushetia, during which they arrested several associates of Magomed Yevloyev, including Islam and Ilez Yandiyev.

By October 2011, four alleged associates of Yevloyev had been arrested: the Yandiyevs, Bashir Khamkhoyev, and Akhmed Yevloyev, Magomed's 15-year-old brother, who had allegedly helped assemble the bomb. They were charged with terrorism, formation of or participation in illegal armed bands, assault on a police officer, and illegal possession of firearms and explosives. Doku Umarov, who claimed responsibility for the attacks, was never apprehended.

A year after the event, in January 2012, the Investigative Committee reported that the investigation was complete, and the final version of the indictment against Yevloyev, Khamkhoyev, and the Yandiyevs was to be brought by March 2012.

The trial in the case ended on 11 November 2013. Khamkhoyev and both Yandiyevs were given life sentences, and Akhmed Yevloyev was sentenced to 10 years imprisonment.

A separate investigation was conducted into the lax or inefficient security measures that were in place at the Domodedovo airport at the time of the attack.

It was reported that Doku Umarov had planned to follow the Domodedovo attack with two additional bombings in Moscow. An attack in Moscow's Red Square was planned for New Year's Eve, 2010, but it was foiled when the suicide bomber accidentally triggered the bomb in a hotel room in Kuzminki District, killing herself in the explosion. Another bombing was to be carried out by a Slavic Russian couple who had converted to Islam, and become members of Caucasus Emirate. However, they were unable to leave Dagestan, and instead committed two separate suicide bombings in the village of Gubden on 14 February 2011, killing two policemen and injuring 27 people.

== Legal ==
On 11 November 2013, four men received jail terms for the offences including commissioning an act of terror, murder and attempted murder. Islam and Ilez Yandiyev and Bashir Khamkhoyev were sentenced to life terms in a penal colony, while Akhmed Yevloyev was jailed for 10 years as he was a minor at the time of the attack. The government's investigators said that the bombing was carried out by Magomed Yevloyev, Akhmed's brother, on the orders of the leader of the Caucasus Emirate, Doku Umarov. The convicted were accused of sheltering the bomber in Nazran, Ingushetia, providing him with money and putting him on a bus to Moscow in preparation for the attack. The investigators also said that his attack was plotted at a camp run by the Caucasus Emirate in Ingushetia.

== Response ==
=== Domestic ===
President Dmitry Medvedev apportioned some blame to poor security at Domodedovo and sacked several officials – said to include a regional transport chief and a Moscow police deputy head; he also announced that he would delay his departure to the World Economic Forum in Davos, Switzerland. Prime Minister Vladimir Putin condemned the bombing as an "abominable crime," and vowed that "retribution is inevitable."

In an interview with NTV on 31 January, the President of the Chechen Republic Ramzan Kadyrov said that the bombing was most likely staged by the USA; he also previously had made statements in which he blamed the US for staging terrorist acts in Russia or for providing financial and technical support to its perpetrators. Senior Russian lawmakers Alexander Torshin and Vladimir Kolesnikov blamed the government of Georgia and its Ossetian agents for the bombing, an allegation that was swiftly condemned by the Foreign Ministry of Georgia as a "purposeful provocation".

The Chechen Republic of Ichkeria, the former separatist government in exile (which split from the other half which would become the Caucasus Emirate in 2007), released a statement sending condolences to the victims, suggesting the attackers may have been desperate, traumatized and hopeless, and strongly condemning the bombing.

=== International ===
Many world leaders expressed their condolences to Russia following the attack.

European Union president Herman Van Rompuy said that those responsible for the attack must be punished. UN Secretary General Ban Ki-moon and NATO chief Anders Fogh Rasmussen also expressed condolences.

The Brazilian Ministry of External Relations stated that "the Brazilian Government is saddened to learn of the attack at Moscow's Domodedovo airport, which resulted in the loss of many lives". According to the note, the Brazilian Government, "in denouncing the action of radical groups that resort to violent acts against civilians, reiterates its staunch condemnation of such attacks, regardless of its motivations".

Prime Minister of Israel Benjamin Netanyahu expressed condolences to the people of Russia and the Russian government on behalf of the people of Israel: "Terrorism is global and the response to terror must be global."

Condolences were sent by:

- President of France Nicolas Sarkozy
- Chancellor of Germany Angela Merkel
- Lithuanian Foreign Minister Audronius Ažubalis
- Slovak President Ivan Gašparovič and Prime Minister Iveta Radičová
- British Prime Minister David Cameron
  - British Foreign Secretary William Hague
- President of the United States Barack Obama

Others included leaders or officials from: Abkhazia, Afghanistan, Albania, Angola, Armenia, Australia, Azerbaijan, Belarus, Canada, Chile, China, Colombia, Cuba, Finland, Georgia, Hungary, India, Iran, Mexico, North Korea, New Zealand, Nicaragua, Pakistan, Palestine, Poland, Romania, South Ossetia, Syria, Ukraine, United Arab Emirates, Venezuela, and Vietnam.

== See also ==
- List of Islamist terrorist attacks
- 21st century attacks in Russia
- Suicide attacks in the North Caucasus conflict
- Crocus City Hall attack
