= Alyoshinka =

- Interactive map of Alyoshinka
- Location of Alyoshinka
- Coordinates: 52°29′09″N 35°04′12″E
- Country: Russia
- Federal subject: Oryol Oblast

Population
  - Estimate (2011): 224 )
- Time zone: UTC+3 (MSK)
- Postal code: 303250
- OKTMO ID: 54612402101

Alyoshinka (Russian: Алёшинка) is a village in Dmitrovsky District of Oryol Oblast, Russia.
