= Movladi Udugov =

Highly ranking Chechen Separatist

- Удуг-некъан Саид1арби-к1ант Мовлади

First Deputy Prime Minister of the Chechen Republic of Ichkeria
- In office August 1996 – 2 February 1997

Personal details
- Born: 9 February 1962 (age 64) Germenchuk, Checheno-Ingush ASSR, Russian SFSR, Soviet Union
- Party: NCCP, IU, CPID (currently none)
- Education: Grozny State University

Movladi Saidarbievich Udugov (Chechen: Мовла́ди Саидарби́евич Уду́гов, born 9 February 1962 in Germenchuk, Shalinsky District, Chechnya into the Shirdi teip) is the former First Deputy Prime Minister of the Chechen Republic of Ichkeria (ChRI). As a Chechen propaganda chief, he was credited for the Chechens' victory on the information front during the First Chechen War.

A controversial figure, following a particularly fundamentalist strain of Islam that is not shared by most Chechens, he is currently one of the ideologues and the main propagandist behind the Caucasus Emirate.

Georgi Derluguian has described him as a "wonderfully opportunistic journalist" and an "autodidactic master of Chechen war propaganda" who, outside Islamic sources, also quotes Western authors such as Gramsci and Huntington.

Udugov currently lives in exile in Turkey.

== Biography ==
=== Early life ===
From 1983 to 1988, Udugov studied in Checheno-Ingushetia State University. In 1988, he became editor in chief of the newspaper Orientir, which was banned by the regional committee of the Communist Party of the Soviet Union in 1989. Soon after, he became a member of the Presidium of the Executive Committee of the National Congress of Chechen People (NCCP). In the NCCP, Udugov became the chairman of the Information Committee and simultaneously an employee of the local television station. During the 1991 revolution in Grozny, Udugov used this position to broadcast future President Dzhokhar Dudayev's address to the Chechen people.

=== Political career ===
After the Chechen declaration of independence by Dudayev, Udugov joined the ruling structures of the Chechen separatist government, serving as press secretary. During the 1994-1996 First Chechen War, the ways in which he distributed information about the conflict, although crude by Western standards, they were still seen as more professional than those of the Kremlin and the Russian federal forces. In August 1996, Udugov was appointed First Deputy Prime Minister of Chechen Republic for state policy and information in the war-time cabinet of Zelimkhan Yandarbiyev who became acting president after Dudayev was killed by a Russian missile strike. For his role in the Chechen victory in information warfare (and the whole war) Udugov was awarded the Ichkeria's highest medal, Honor of the Nation. Among his Russian enemies, he became known as "the Chechen Goebbels".

Following the end of the First Chechen War, Udugov unsuccessfully ran for the post of President of Ichkeria in the January 1997 election, but received less than 1% of the votes (in his election campaign he was representing an unpopular radical Islamist platform). Udugov again became Deputy Prime Minister and of the Minister of Information in the government of Aslan Maskhadov. In 1996-1997 he travelled to Moscow on a number of occasions for talks with members of the Security Council of Russia and Russian government, including as part of the Chechen delegation sent for the signing of peace treaty at the Kremlin. In August 1997, Udugov founded Islamic Umma party, uniting a number of political movements in Chechnya and neighbouring Dagestan. In 1998, together with Shamil Basayev and several other radical Chechen and Dagestani figures, Udugov organized the association known as the Congress of the Peoples of Ichkeria and Dagestan. In March 1999, Udugov helped to create Kavkaz Center, a Chechen international Islamic Internet agency; he also sponsored several other websites, among them Russian language The Chechen Times. According to an Anti-Defamation League investigator, Udugov propagated antisemitic ideas in his media.

=== Since 1999 ===
Russian authorities accused Udugov of being one of the main organizers of the Chechen rebel-led attack on Dagestan in August 1999. He has been wanted by the Russian federal government since 20 March 2000, accused of having violated Article 279 of Russia's criminal code, which outlaws "armed uprisings." At the start of the Second Chechen War in September 1999, Udugov left Chechnya and moved abroad, resulting in a rapid decline of his influence on the Chechen separatist movement. Reports soon emerged about his stay in Afghanistan, Scandinavia, Turkey, Persian Gulf countries and, possibly, the United States; although no evidence has been offered to support any of these claims.

Since February 2006, following his victory in a dispute with exiled moderate Chechen leader Akhmed Zakayev, he once again became an official rebel spokesman, heading the National Information Service (NIS) of the State Defense Council. In October 2007, Udugov was said to be the author of the proclamation of the Caucasus Emirate; during the following constitutional crisis, the ChRI government in exile led by Zakayev dismissed Udugov from the post of the head of NIS and abolished the service.

Since 2007, while openly living in Turkey, Udugov has run the Informational-Analytical Service of the Caucasus Emirate.
