= State Defense Council =

Military committee of the Chechen Republic of Ichkeria

The State Defense Council is the military command committee of the Chechen Republic of Ichkeria (ChRI), established by the separatist government of Dzhokhar Dudayev in 1992.

The State Defense Committee was established in a combined emergency session of the ChRI Parliament and Government on September 23, 1999, as a consequence of the Russian attack on Chechnya. Its task was to take over the highest executive power in the country during the period of martial law, while Parliament and Government are temporarily unable to work under normal and regular conditions.

It was later reformed and renamed State Defense Council Majlis al-Shura under Aslan Maskhadov in 2002, when Shamil Basayev was chosen as the Council leader.

== See also ==
- USSR State Defense Committee
