= Kavkaz Center =

Chechen political website

- Website type: News
- Available in: Russian, English, Ukrainian, Arabic, Turkish
- Creator: Movladi Udugov
- Website: kavkazcenter.com
- Registration: none
- Launched: March 1999
- Current status: Undergoing maintenance

The Kavkaz Center (KC; Russian: Кавказ-центр, romanized: Kavkaz-tsentr, lit. 'Caucasus Center') is a privately run website/portal which aims to be "a Chechen internet agency which is independent, international and Islamic". The stated mission of the site is to report events related to Chechnya and also to "provide international news agencies with news-letters, background information and assistance in making independent journalistic work in North Caucasus".

== History ==
Founded in March 1999 in the city of Grozny in Chechnya, the KC was organized and headed by Movladi Udugov, former Minister of Information of Chechnya and then-leader of the "national information service". The organisation is banned in Russia. According to Dr Greg Simons from Swedish National Defence College, "not all of the content on Kavkazcenter can be classified as being extremist and dangerous. However, some material that appears on the website clearly is falling into the realm of extremist and terrorist material." On the other hand, David McDuff, an editor with Prague Watchdog, has written that the Kavkaz Center is "thought by some observers to be a disinformation center run with the help of Russia’s special services."

The Kavkaz Center caused a major controversy in September 2004 when the server hosting it, located in Lithuania, was shut down by Lithuanian authorities (under pressure from Russian secret services) on hate speech charges, after a letter from the Chechen rebel commander Shamil Basayev claiming responsibility for the Beslan school hostage crisis and a series of photos from the preparations for the attack were published on the site. The website subsequently re-opened on a webserver at the Internet service provider PRQ, in Sweden, and then in April 2008 it moved to an Estonian server, supplied by the AS Starman.

After the October 2005 Nalchik attack in the republic of Kabardino-Balkaria, the Kavkaz Center alleged that it was targeted by the FSB in a campaign to discredit them, which consisted on a massive worldwide distribution of spam mail, which supposedly came from the Kavkaz Center website. After receiving several DoS attacks, a message was published on the Kavkaz Center homepage, stating that they never sent the spam people received, and that it was a campaign to discredit them due their points of view. Another spam attack campaign was active again on November 29, 2005, soliciting donations to a bank account in Sweden.

In 2006, Russian journalist and regular KC contributor Boris Stomakhin was sentenced by a Moscow court to five years in prison for "fueling religious hatred". Another Russian regular contributor, Pavel Lyuzakov, was sentenced to two years in a prison colony for illegally acquiring and possessing a firearm in 2005.

Starting on 6 June 2012 and continuing for over two months, Kavkaz Center was the target of a massive distributed denial of service (DDoS) attack that peaked at 45 million packets per second. The attack was said to be among the largest on record and took the agency's main Sweden-based server and mirror sites offline in July 2012. Russia has also pressured Swedish authorities to take down the web site which is hosted by PRQ, a company owned by the founders of The Pirate Bay.

According to rulings of the judicial bodies of the Russian Federation, materials published on the site are extremist and incite ethnic hatred. It was therefore included in the Federal List of Extremist Materials per Russian internet censorship law and blocked for viewing from Russia.
