= Suicide attacks in the North Caucasus conflict =

Chechen separatism within Russia

In June 2000, the North Caucasian Chechen separatist-led Chechen insurgents added suicide bombing to their tactics in their struggle against Russia. Since then, there have been dozens of suicide attacks within and outside the republic of Chechnya, resulting in thousands of casualties among Russian security personnel and civilians. The profiles of the suicide bombers have varied, as have the circumstances surrounding the bombings.

Although the most publicized Chechen suicide attacks have taken place in Moscow, most attacks have occurred in Chechnya, while several additional attacks have taken place in the extended North Caucasus region and particularly the neighboring Russian republic of Ingushetia. The majority of suicide bombings, targeting military installations and government compounds in and around Chechnya and also top government officials, have been directed against those whom the separatists consider to be combatants.

== Summary ==
As of 2014, most of the bombers appear to be ethnic Chechens, but there have also been multiple examples of ethnic Ingush, Dagestani, or Ossetian bombers as well. Of the non-Chechen bombers, most of the attacks have been carried out by Ingush bombers, an ethnic group closely related to the Chechens (the Ingush bear a separate set of grudges against Russia, including Russian support of the Ossetian side of the East Prigorodny Conflict). None of the attacks so far have occurred in Kabardino-Balkaria or with any known involvement of local rebel groups there.

There is no evidence of any foreign involvement in either the planning or execution of Chechen attacks aside from the inspiration from the tactics employed in the Arab–Israeli conflict. Female suicide bombers, referred to as shahidka by Chechens (meaning a female martyr) or "Black Widows" by Russians (as they have often had a husband [and/or children] killed by the Russian army or the Kadyrovtsy), comprise a clear majority of Chechen suicide attackers. This trend stands in direct contrast to ongoing suicide bomb campaigns in Israel and Iraq, where women constitute only a small minority of suicide bombers.

What is also somewhat unusual about Chechen bombing is that although the tactics used are largely similar to those used by Islamic militants, religion is usually not the cited motivation, despite Russian claims. For example, female bomber Khava Barayeva stated that she attacked in the name of Chechen independence, and urged more Chechens to do the same for their national honor.

Family members of identified bombers often suffer severe reprisals (beatings, arson attacks, kidnappings, torture and murder) at the hands of masked gunmen presumed to be government agents and members of pro-Kremlin militias, although the same may be said about the relatives of all Chechen rebels.

Through the first five years of the Chechen-Russian conflict (including the First Chechen War and most of the first year of the Second Chechen War), there were no planned suicide bombings related to Chechnya. The highest concentrations of suicide attacks to date occurred in the following time periods:

- The summer of 2000, when suicide bombers used cars and trucks filled with explosives to attack military and police targets in Chechnya
- 2003–2004, when a much-publicized wave of explosive belt terrorist attacks against Russian civilians swept out of Chechnya and into Moscow
- The summer of 2009. The 2009 terrorists appear to have been mostly male, targeting police and regional top officials in and near Chechnya.

Radical rebel commander Shamil Basayev and his extremist gang, Riyadus-Salikhin Reconnaissance and Sabotage Battalion of Chechen Martyrs, claimed responsibility for a number of them.

In late 2004, following the Beslan disaster, attacks (excluding those against the Kadyrov regime) ceased for four years due to major changes in tactics employed by the separatist movement. The reason for this was cited as a certain amount of shame over Beslan on the part of the Chechen separatists. A spokesman said in 2004 that "A bigger blow could not have been dealt on us. ... People around the world will think that Chechens are beasts and monsters if they could attack children."

The bombings resumed by 2008 and in April 2009. Caucasus Emirate leader Doku Umarov announced the reactivation of the Riyadus-Salikhin extremist gang, which had been disbanded in 2006 at the behest of Umarov's predecessor Sheikh Abdul Halim. Multiple attacks were then conducted during what Umarov called the "year of offensive". The Emirate's leadership has been compelled to revert to the tactic of istishhad by the influx of volunteers, which has coincided with a severe shortage of food and weapons.

== Russian suicide bombing incidents ==
=== Attacks against Russian government targets ===
June 2000 Chechnya bombings
June 6–11, 2000 – Chechnya experienced its first suicide bombings when two Chechen girls, 22-year-old Khava Barayeva and 16-year-old Luiza Magomadova, and Russian former prisoner of war and Islam convert Djabrail Sergeyev (Sergey Dimitriyev) attacked separate checkpoints manned by Russian paramilitary police in the Chechen capital Grozny and in the village of Alkhan-Yurt with two car bombs, killing at least four OMON troops (25 Russians were killed according to rebels).

July 2000 Chechnya bombings
July 2–3, 2000 – Chechens launched five or six bomb attacks targeting various Russian military and police headquarters and barracks within 24 hours, killing at least 54 people and injuring more than 100, including civilians. The most deadly of the attacks killed 25 Russian MVD troops and injured 81 at the Interior Ministry base in the town of Argun (this bombing was also filmed from a safe distance). In the city of Gudermes, 11 people were killed at a police station. Other, less successful attacks in Grozny, Urus Martan and Novogroznensky resulted in the government losses of eight killed and three missing, according to official reports. Shamil Basayev claimed responsibility for organization of the attacks, which according to Movladi Udugov, resulted in more than 600 federal casualties.

August 2000 Chechnya bombings
A series of attacks in Urus-Martan, Khankala, Argun and elsewhere killed at least 30 people and injured 50.

November 2000 Urus-Martan bombing
November 29, 2001 – A young Chechen woman, Aiza Gazuyeva (aged 18 or 20), blew up herself with a hand grenade, killing Russian General Gaidar Gadzhiyev, whom she blamed for the death of her detained husband. Two other soldiers were also killed and two were injured.

2002 Grozny bombing
December 27, 2002 – Two Chechen bombers, Gelani Tumriyev and his 17-year-old half-Russian daughter, Alina Tumriyeva, dressed in Russian military uniforms and using official passes, drove a truck bomb into the heavily guarded main republican administration compound in Grozny, wrecking the four-story "government house". At least 83 people were killed and 210 injured, a number of them Chechen and federal government officials. Deputy Prime Minister Zina Batyzheva was seriously hurt and a deputy military commandant of Chechnya was also injured. The explosion had the force of one ton of TNT. Shamil Basayev claimed responsibility for both the planning and execution of the attack, which was recorded by camera.

2003 Znamenskoye bombing
On May 12, 2003, three bombers (a man and two women) drove a truck full of explosives into a government complex in Znamenskoye, northern Chechnya. The blast gutted the regional republican FSB headquarters responsible for coordinating the ongoing "counter-extremist operation" in all of Chechnya. At least 59 people were killed and about 200 injured in the filmed attack, including multiple civilians in the nearby marketplace.

2003 Ilikskhan-Yurt bombing
May 14, 2003 – Pro-Russian Chechen President Akhmad Kadyrov was targeted by a pair of female bombers (Shakhidat Baymuradova and Zulai Abdulazakova) at a religious festival in the village of Ilishkhan-Yurt. The pair were however stopped by his bodyguards. An explosive device detonated by Baymuradova, a 46-year-old veteran woman guerrilla, killed 16 people, including Abdulazakova, and injured 43 others.

June 2003 Mozdok bombing
June 5, 2003 – An unidentified female bomber, apparently dressed as a medic, attacked a bus carrying Russian Air Force pilots and other personnel (including civilian workers) to the Mozdok airbase in North Ossetia, killing at least 17 of them and injuring 14. Mozdok Air Base has been used by the Russian federal forces for operations in Chechnya since 1994.

June 2003 Grozny bombing
June 20, 2003 – A truck bomb attack on a cluster of Grozny government buildings, including headquarters of the OMON special police and the Justice Ministry, failed when the bomb exploded prematurely, killing up to eight and injuring some 36.

August 2003 Mozdok bombing
August 1, 2003 – An unidentified bomber driving a KamAZ truck packed with one ton of explosives blew up a military hospital treating the military casualties from Chechnya in another attack at Mozdok, in North Ossetia, less than two months after the airbase bus blast in June. The massive explosion destroyed the hospital building completely, collapsing it and killing at least 50 and injuring 82, mostly wounded or sick soldiers and medical personnel. Chechen rebels loyal to the Aslan Maskhadov government claimed they had nothing to do with the bombing. The commander of the Mozdok military hospital, Lt. Col. Artur Arakelian, was arrested on charges of criminal negligence and failure to carry out an order.

2003 Magas bombing
September 15, 2003 – Two unidentified attackers detonated a truck bomb outside the republican FSB headquarters in Magas, the new capital of Ingushetia, killing three other people and injuring 29. The building was only slightly damaged and the devastation was limited mostly to its parking lot.

2008 Vedeno bombing
August 30, 2008 – A pair of suicide bombers in a car attacked perimeter of a base of Internal Troops at Vedeno, killing at least one paramilitary soldier and injuring 11 more.

May 2009 Grozny bombing
May 15, 2009 – An elderly man detonated a bomb after unsuccessfully trying to get into the Interior Ministry in Grozny, killing two policemen at the security gate and injuring at least five other people. A taxi driver who had dropped him there was gunned down by the police and then declared to be an accomplice of the attacker, despite the first reports claiming that he was a civilian killed in the blast. That was the first bombing in Grozny since 2003.

June 2009 Nazran bombing
June 23, 2009 – Ingush President Yunus-bek Yevkurov was critically injured in a suicide car bomb attack on his motorcade that wrecked his armoured Mercedes car. His brother, who served as his head of security, was also injured, and his driver and a bodyguard were killed. Police said they identified the bomber as an Ingush woman Pyatimat Mutaliyeva.

July 2009 Grozny bombing
July 26, 2009 – A belt attack by 21-year-old Rustam Mukhadiyev (Mukhadiev) outside the Grozny theatre and concert hall killed at least six people, including four high-ranking police officers (one of them sent to Chechnya from the republic of Adygea), and injured up to 10. The possible target of the attack may have been Chechen President Ramzan Kadyrov, who later accused the young Islamic rebel scholar Said Buryatsky of an attempt to assassinate him. The two civilians killed in the attack were said to be from Georgia and Turkey, making them the first foreigners to have died in North Caucasus attacks.

August 2009 Nazran bombing
August 17, 2009 – A filmed car bomb attack against the police headquarters in Nazran killed at least 25 and injured about 138 people, including civilians, and destroyed the main police station in the republic's largest city. Russian President Dmitry Medvedev sacked the Ingush police chief, while the Ingush President at the time Yunus-bek Yevkurov accused Britain, the United States, Israel and Islamic militants in the region. The rebels did not reveal the bomber's identity, allegedly out of fear of reprisals against his family, but the preparation of the bombing was claimed by militant leader Sheikh Said Buryatsky, at first widely presumed to be the man who had carried out the attack.

August 2009 Chechnya bombings
August 21–25, 2009 – Two bombers riding bicycles staged an apparently coordinated pair of attacks against the Chechen police in Grozny, killing at least four officers and injuring a civilian woman, according to police officials. The use of bicycles would represent a new tactic for the insurgents. Four days later, four more policemen were killed and another one and two civilians injured in a suicide attack at a car wash in the village of Mesker-Yurt, according to the police.

2009 Makhachkala bombing
September 1, 2009 – In the reportedly first attack in the Russian republic of Dagestan, a federal customs officer was killed and 14 people (including five police officers and four civilians) injured in the regional capital, Makhachkala, as a result of a car bomb, a spokesman for the Russian Interior Ministry's office in Dagestan said.

September 2009 Grozny bombing
September 16, 2009 – A female suicide bomber attacked a traffic police car at the crossroads of the Peace and Putin Avenues in the center of Grozny, killing at least one policeman and injuring at least six other people, according to a Chechen police spokesman.

December 2009 Nazran suicide bombing
December 17, 2009 – A suicide bomber himself up with a car bomb at a police station in Ingushetia, killing himself and injuring 23 others. It was reported that three children were among the injured. The car reportedly had a license plate from nearby Chechnya.

January 2010 Makhachkala suicide bombing
January 6, 2010 – A bomber detonated his explosives near the gates of the base Battalion DPS. The bomb reportedly detonated prematurely as local police were suspicious of a vehicle trying to enter the gates to the base and rammed it. The vehicle exploded. At least six people were killed in this bombing and another 14 others were injured.

2010 Kizlyar bombings
March 31, 2010 – In Kizlyar, Dagestan, two bomb blasts resulted in the deaths of at least 12 people, including the local police chief for the area. It is known that the second bomber had been dressed as a policeman, and it has been reported that another 29 were wounded in these blasts. The first bomber detonated his car near the buildings of the Interior Ministry. The second bomber apparently struck as a team of investigators were working at the scene of the first explosion.

April 2010 Karabulak suicide bombing
April 5, 2010 – Two blasts occurred near to a police station in Karabulak, Ingushetia. It was reported that at least two police officers were killed and another 13 injured. At least one of these blasts was carried out by a suicide bomber. The second explosion was allegedly caused by a car nearby that had presumably been mined by the suicide bomber, who had arrived in the vehicle.

April 2010 Ingushetia suicide attack
April 9, 2010 – A female bomber blew herself up after shooting dead a police officer in the village of Ekazhevo within the republic of Ingushetia.

April 2010 Makhachkala suicide bombing
April 29, 2010 – In Makhachkala, Dagestan, a bomber set off a car-bomb at a police checkpoint after being stopped for an inspection. Three police officers were killed and another 16 were injured.

June 2010 Grozny suicide bombing
June 30, 2010 – In Grozny, Chechnya, a bomber blew himself up during a document check in the centre of the capital city. The bomber was killed and at least 10 others were apparently injured, including at least four police officers and six civilians.

August 2010 Prigorodny suicide bombing
August 17, 2010 – In the Prigorodny district of North Ossetia, a bomber blew himself up after an identification check at a police checkpoint between the borders of the North Caucasus republics of Ingushetia and North Ossetia. It was later reported that the bomber and at least two police officers died. At least three others were apparently injured.

September 2010 Buinaksk bombing
September 5, 2010 – A car bomber rammed his explosive-laden vehicle into the gates of a military base near Buinaksk, in Dagestan. It was reported that at least five Russian soldiers were killed and that around 39 others were injured. A secondary IED explosion apparently blew up as investigators were traveling to the scene of the first bombing. However, there were no reported casualties.

September 2010 Makhachkala bombing
September 24, 2010 – In Makhachkala, the capital city of Dagestan, a bomber detonated his explosives at a police cordon. At least two police officers were killed and another 44 others were injured, some critically.

October 2010 Grozny attack
October 19, 2010 – Three gunmen attacked a parliament building in Grozny, killing three and injuring another 17. All three blew themselves up when police reached them.

October 2010 Khasavyurt suicide bombing
October 23, 2010 – In Khasavyurt, in Dagestan, a car-bomber attempted to drive his vehicle into a police station within the city, then blew himself up. At least one police officer was killed and 12 others were apparently injured.

February 2011 Gubden suicide bombings
February 15, 2011 – In the village of Gubden, in Dagestan, it was reported that two bomb explosions occurred, one of which involved a female and the other a car-bomber, both targeting a Russian security checkpoint. At least three police officers were killed and more than 25 others injured.

2012 Makhachkala bombings
May 3, 2012 – A series of two successive suicide bombers at a police checkpoint on the outskirts of Makhachkala killed a total of 13 people and injured 130. The first bomb was detonated during a routine traffic stop at the checkpoint. The second bomb was then detonated when fire brigades and ambulances arrived at the scene, compounding casualties.

2012 Sagopshi bombing
August 19, 2012 – In the village of Sagopshi in northern Ingushetia, a male bomber entered the yard of a private home where a wake was being conducted for a police officer shot in the line of duty a day earlier, and detonated a suicide belt. 7 fellow officers who had come to pay respects were killed, and 11 more were injured.

2014 Grozny bombing
October 5, 2014 – In the Chechen capital of Grozny, a concert was held in a hall as part of celebrations of Grozny City Day, which coincided in 2014 with the birthday of Chechen president Ramzan Kadyrov. 19 year old Grozny resident Opti Mudarov attempted to enter the concert, but was deemed suspicious by police officers and was detained at the metal detectors. When officers attempted to search him, Mudarov detonated his device, killing 5 police officers and wounding at least 12 other people.

=== Attacks against Russian civilians ===
2003 Tushino bombing
July 5, 2003 – 20-year-old Chechen woman Zulikhan Elikhadzhiyeva blew herself up outside a rock festival at the Tushino airfield near Moscow; her bomb did not detonate as expected. 15 minutes later, only a few meters from where Zulikhan blew herself up, 26-year-old Zinaida Aliyeva detonated her explosives. The attack killed 11 people on the spot, while at least 60 people were injured and four of them later died in hospital.

2003 Stavropol train bombing
December 5, 2003 – A shrapnel-filled bomb, believed to have been strapped to a lone male attacker, ripped apart a commuter train near Chechnya, killing 46 people and injuring nearly 200. The explosion occurred during a busy morning rush hour when the train was loaded with students and workers; it ripped the side of the train open as it approached a station near the town of Yessentuki in Stavropol Krai. The attacks occurred one day after Russia's State Duma elections.

2003 Red Square bombing
December 10, 2003 – Only five days later, a blast occurred at Red Square in the very center of Moscow, as Khadishat Mangeriyeva (widow of separatist field commander Ruslan Mangeriyev) set off a body belt packed with ball bearings near the Kremlin and State Duma, killing six people and injuring 44. Shamil Basayev claimed responsibility for organising both of the December 2003 attacks, as well as the August aircraft bombings.

February 2004 Moscow metro bombing
February 6, 2004 – A bomb ripped through a Moscow metro car during rush hour morning near the Avtozavodskaya subway station in Moscow, killing at least 40 people and injuring 134. This time, Basayev denied responsibility for the bombing. A previously unknown Chechen extremist group claimed it launched the attack to mark the fourth anniversary of the February 2000 Novye Aldi massacre in Chechnya.

2004 aircraft bombings
August 24, 2004 – Two Russian airliners crashed nearly simultaneously in the Tula and Rostov regions of Russia, killing a total of 90 people. Two Chechen women, Amanta Nagayeva (30) and Satsita Dzhebirkhanova (37), have been identified as the perpetrators of the attack.

August 2004 Moscow metro bombing
August 31, 2004 – Twenty-nine-year-old Roza Nagayeva (sister of Amanat Nagayeva) apparently panicked and prematurely detonated explosives before entering the Rizhskaya metro station in the Russian capital. Ten other people were killed (including her apparent handler, ethnic Ukrainian Islamic militant Nikolai Kipkeyev) and about 30 injured in the blast.

2008 Vladikavkaz bombing
November 6, 2008 – A suspected female bomber exiting a minibus killed at least 11 people and injured as many as 40 others at a taxi-van stop next to the central market in Vladikavkaz, capital of North Ossetia, officials said. No claim of responsibility was issued.

2010 Moscow Metro bombings
March 29, 2010 – Two female bombers blew themselves up in Moscow's subway system as it was packed with rush-hour passengers, killing at least 40 and wounding more than 75.

2010 Vladikavkaz bombing
September 9, 2010 – A car-bomber detonated his explosive-laden vehicle at the Central market in the city of Vladikavkaz, capital of North Ossetia. At least 17 people were killed and more than 160 others were apparently injured, according to official reports.

2011 Domodedovo International Airport bombing
January 24, 2011 – A male bomber detonated his explosives at the international arrivals hall of Moscow's Domodedovo International Airport, killing at least 36 people and injuring more than 180 others. Several foreign nationals were among the fatalities.

October 2013 Volgograd bus bombing
October 21, 2013 – A 30 year old Dagestani woman, Naida Akhiyalova, detonated a suicide belt on a public bus in Volgograd. The bus was heavily occupied, with 40 occupants onboard at the time of the explosion. 6 people were killed and 28 were injured, 8 of those critically so. Authorities believe that the bombing was intended to heighten fears as the 2014 Winter Olympics approached in Sochi. Akhiyalova was an Islamic militant "Black Widow" bomber, and was married to fellow militant and explosives expert Dmitry Sokolov, who claimed responsibility for constructing the explosive device Akhiyalova detonated. Sokolov was killed in November of 2013 in a shootout with police in Semender, outside of Makhachkala.

December 2013 Volgograd bombings

December 29–30, 2013 – A female suicide bomber entered a train station in Volgograd on the morning of December 29, and detonated her explosive as she approached a metal detector, killing at least 13 people. The act was quickly reported as an act of suspected terrorism, despite no group claiming credit for the attack. The following morning, another suicide bomb was detonated in Volgograd on a trolleybus, killing at least 14 and injuring at least 28. Both bombings were attributed to tensions in the lead-up to the 2014 Olympics in Sochi, with the Caucasus Emirate having threatened intensified violence in Sochi during the games.

=== Hostage crises ===
Moscow theater hostage crisis
October 23–26, 2002 – Among about 40 hostage takers at Dubrovka musical theater were some 20 young female militants who claimed to be wearing explosive belts. The women, between the ages of 16 and 26, were led by Zura Barayeva, widow of the Chechen warlord Arbi Barayev and also a relative of 22-year old Movsar Barayev, the self-described leader of the entire group. On the third day of the crisis, Russian special forces raided the theater and all of the militants in the building were shot to death at close range, a number of them after being subdued. None of the explosive devices detonated during the Russian assault; the bombs turned out to be mostly just dummies, and even the few real ones were not in working order.

Beslan school hostage crisis
September 1–3, 2004 – A group of armed mostly Ingush and Chechen extremists took more than 1,100 people (including 777 children) hostage at School Number One in the town of Beslan, in North Ossetia–Alania. Some of the adult hostages were killed. On the third day, Russian security forces stormed the building. At least 334 hostages, including 186 children, died, hundreds more were injured and some were reported missing.

=== Failed attacks ===
- December 2000 – A truck bomb driven by a 16-year-old Chechen girl, Mareta Dudayeva, was stopped by gunfire as it smashed through the checkpoints and blockposts on its way to an Interior Ministry building in the Leninsky District of Grozny. Dudayeva was wounded by the guards but survived the attack.
- February 5, 2002 – 15-year-old Zarema Inarkayeva smuggled a small bomb inside of the building of Zavodsky district police station in Grozny; the bomb did not detonate properly and she was captured alive.
- July 10, 2003 – 22-year-old ethnic Ingush woman Zarema Muzhakhoyeva was captured while exiting a café on central Moscow's Tverskaya Street; she said she believed that she was under observation by her male handlers ("Igor" and "Andrei"), who could detonate her bomb by remote control. An FSB bomb expert was killed trying to defuse her explosive device, but Muzhikoyeva survived. In April 2004, she was sentenced to 20 years in prison despite her full cooperation with the authorities.
- July 27, 2003 – Chechen woman Mariam Tashukhadzhiyeva detonated explosives outside a police station in the outskirts of Grozny, where Ramzan Kadyrov was reviewing his paramilitary troops, killing herself. The blast also injured one of guards who had stopped her and a female passerby.
- April 7, 2004 - Ingushetia's President Murat Zyazikov, a former KGB general, was lightly injured by a suicide car bomb attack on his motorcade. He was saved by the armour plating of his Mercedes-Benz car; six of his bodyguards were also injured.
- January 9, 2007 – A car laden with explosives attempted to ram through a roadblock set up by OMSN forces roughly 10 kilometres (6.2 mi) south-west of Grozny. The driver was killed by gunfire and the passenger exited the vehicle. It is likely the occupants attempted to detonate the explosives, but were unable to; recovered evidence showed the explosives were not properly wired. The driver, Dimitri Kozletski (24), was a Ukrainian national and the young passenger, whose identity is still unknown, is reported to have fled to either Saudi Arabia or the United States.
- October 1, 2008 – A male suicide bomber attacked the motorcade of Ingush Interior Minister Musa Medov in Nazran. Medov and his bodyguards were unharmed, but five bystanders were injured by the blast.
- September 11–12, 2009 – At least three civilians and two policemen were injured (one of the civilians mortally) in a suicide car-bomb attack on a road-patrol police blockpost at the Kavkaz federal highway near Nazran in Ingushetia. The police opened fire on a van as it approached. Subsequent reports stated nine people were wounded. On the same day, Dagestani security forces detained a woman, Sakinat Saidova, suspected of planning to carry out a suicide bombing in the regional capital Makhachkala. The next day, September 12, three policemen were injured in an explosion set off by a female bomber near a police post in central Grozny, according to authorities.
- October 23, 2009 - Chechen security services claimed they prevented an assassination attempt on Chechen President Ramzan Kadyrov and his (and Duma) deputy Adam Delimkhanov visiting a construction site of Akhmad Kadrov memorial center in Grozny. Alleged Urus-Martan region rebel leader Beslan Bashtayev was shot and killed while driving a VAZ car, Chechen deputy interior minister Roman Edilov said. The deceased was known to be a follower of Sulim Yamadayev (the rival of Kadyrov, who was assassinated earlier in 2009, allegedly by Delimkhanov).
- October 5, 2010 - A bomber, Yerlan Usupov, opened fire at Russian security forces surrounding a private house and tried to break through the police cordon. However, Russian security forces returned fire, prematurely detonating the suicide-bomb belt that he was wearing.
- January, 2014 - As one of the multiple heightened potential threats posed by Islamic militants in the lead-up to the 2014 Winter Olympics in Sochi, 23 year old Ruzanna Ibragimova was suspected to have snuck through increased security in Sochi around 10 January 2014, with the intention of later detonating a suicide bomb. Several other suicide bombers were also suspected to be already inside the city. Reports circulated internationally of the manhunt for Ibragimova and the other suspected bombers, but no international news circulated of any bombings being successfully carried out during the games in Sochi.

=== Bombings by cornered militants ===
- February 16, 2005 – A prominent foreign extremist named Abu Zaid Al-Kuwaiti blew up himself after being surrounded by Russian special forces in his safe house in Ingushetia, the FSB said.
- February 10, 2009 – A group of about four militants allegedly preparing to assassinate the President of Ingushetia blew up the building they were holed in during a siege/firefight in Magas, killing at least four members of Murmansk Oblast OMON and injuring as many as 24 others, including three civilians. The blast was powerful enough to overturn an armoured vehicle and several trucks. Unofficial reports put the police death toll at 15.
- August 28, 2009 – Three police officers and three civilians were injured when two insurgents wounded in a firefight blew themselves up in the Chechen town of Shali, a police spokesperson said.
- October 21, 2009 – Four policemen and a passerby were injured by a blast in the Oktyabrsky District of Grozny when police tried to detain 17-year old Zaurbek Khashumov, Chechen Interior Minister Ruslan Alkhanov said.
- October 23, 2009 – Five people, including a policeman and two militants, were killed during a special operation by Chechen police against a suspected cell in Grozny. According to Interior Minister Alkhanov, who was at the scene of the operation, two women in the house (20-year-old Eva Gaisumova and 21-year-old Khava Khasaeva) blew themselves up.
- October 27–29, 2009 – A Chechen militant identified as 24-year-old Ibrahim Kasumov blew himself up on one of Grozny's main squares with a hand grenade, killing one police officer and injuring another policeman during an attempt to detain him, Interior Minister Alkhanov said. Two days later on October 29, another militant, Kureysh Duguyev, 19, also blew himself up after being surrounded by police in the Leninsky District of Grozny, but with no other casualties, Alkhanov said.

== See also ==
- Istishhad
- Shahidka
