= Islam in Belgium =

Islam in Europe by percentage of country population 95–100%: Azerbaijan; 90–95%: Turkey; Kosovo; 50–70%: Albania; Bosnia and Herzegovina; Kazakhstan; 30–35%: North Macedonia; 10–20%: France; Sweden; Georgia; Montenegro; 5–10%: Austria; Belgium; Bulgaria; Denmark; Germany; Liechtenstein; Luxembourg; Netherlands; Russia; Switzerland; United Kingdom; Spain; Greece; 4–5%: Serbia; 2–4%: Italy; Finland; Norway; Malta; Slovenia; Cyprus (Note: Only takes into account the Muslim population residing on land controlled by the Republic of Cyprus.); 1–2%: Croatia; Ireland; Ukraine; Andorra; < 1%: Iceland; Armenia; Belarus; Czech Republic; Estonia; Hungary; Latvia; Lithuania; Moldova; Monaco; Poland; Portugal; Romania; San Marino; Slovakia

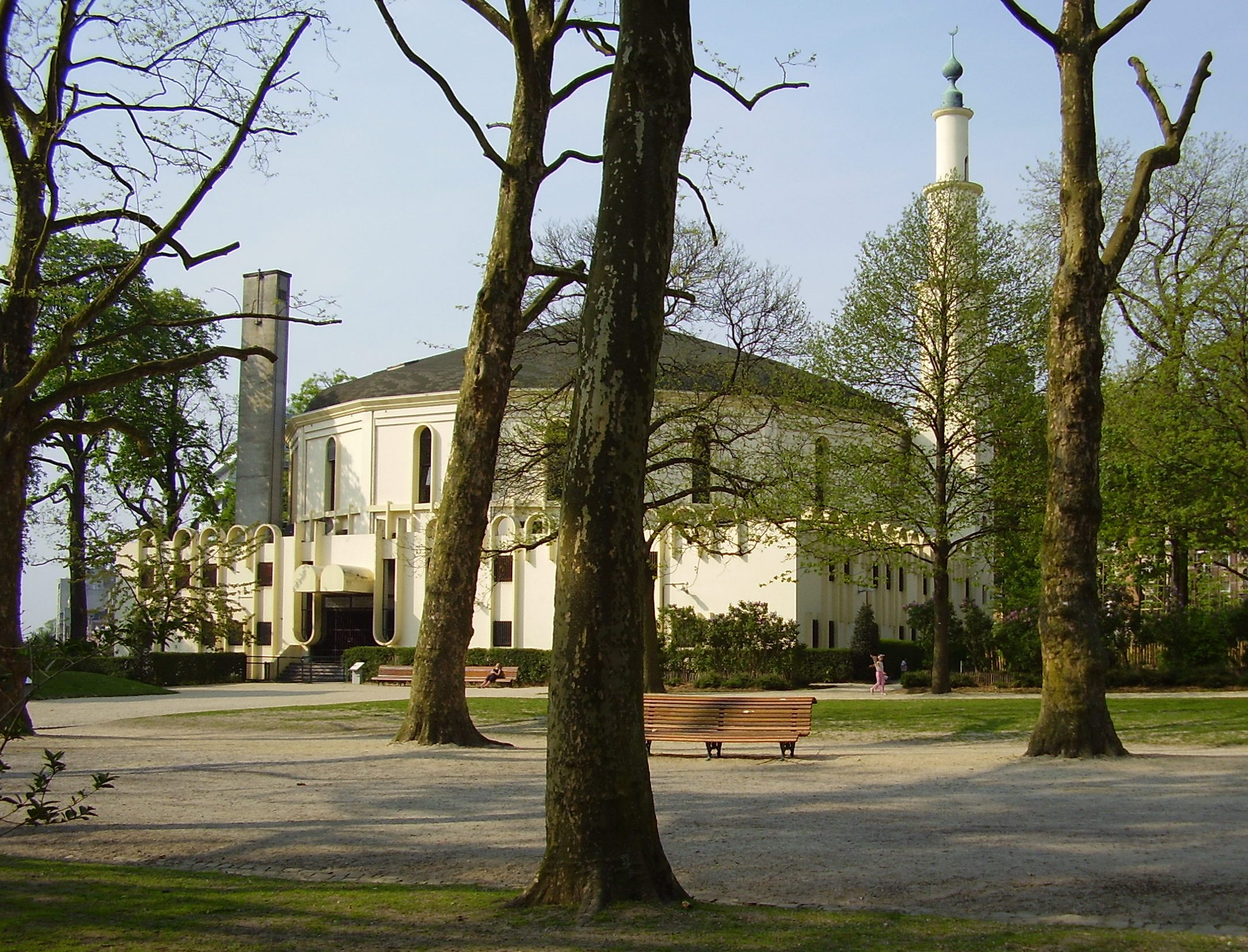
Great Mosque of Brussels.

Islam is the second-largest religion in Belgium, after Christianity. The exact number of Muslims in Belgium is unknown but various sources estimate that 4.0% to 7.6% of the country's population adheres to Islam. The first registered presence of Islam in Belgium was in 1829, but most Belgian Muslims are first-, second-, or third-generation immigrants that arrived after the 1960s.

== History ==
The first registered presence of Islam in Belgium was in 1829, a year prior to the country's independence in 1830. In 1964, bilateral labour immigration agreement were signed between Belgium, Turkey, and countries in the Maghreb. Over 10,000 workers from these countries moved to Belgium and mostly worked in low-skilled jobs such as coal mining, steelmaking, the automobile industry, etc. This stopped in 1974 when all foreign manual labour was banned from entry into the country and, in the same year, Islam was officially recognised as a religion in Belgium.

According to a 2006 opinion poll, 61% of the Belgian population thought tensions between Muslims and other communities would increase in the future.

In 2011, Belgian authorities instituted a ban on face-covering attire in public, which meant the wearing of the niqāb and burqa were considered incompatible with Belgian society. The ban was challenged by two Muslim women in first the Constitutional Court and then the European Court of Human Rights (ECHR), but was upheld.

== Demographics ==
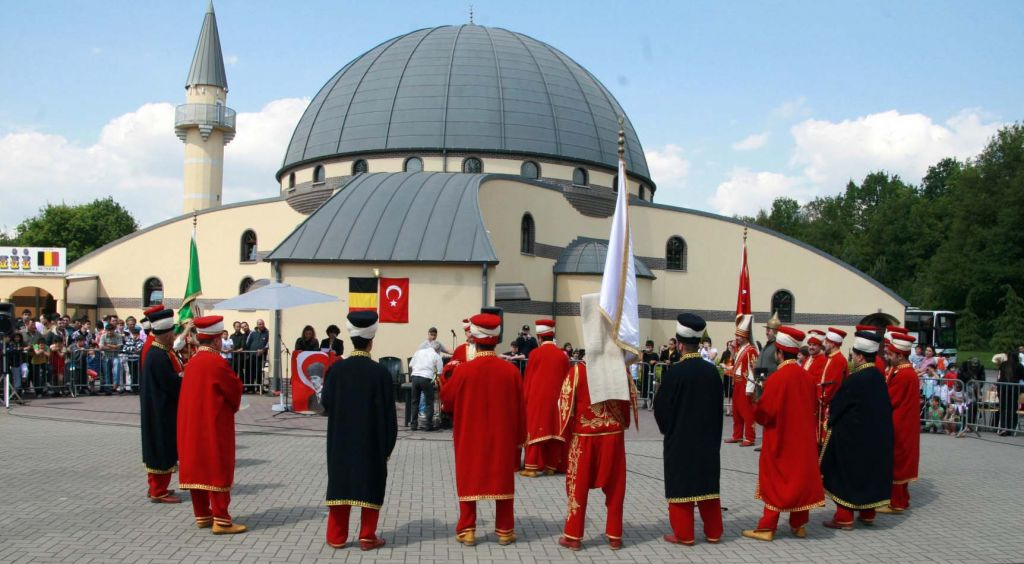
Yunus Emre Mosque of the Turkish community of Belgium.

The Belgian government does not collect or publish statistics on religious affiliation, so the exact number of Muslims in Belgium is unknown. In 2014, various sources estimated Muslims to be 4.0% to 6.5% of the country's population. The Centre de Relations Européennes estimated in 2000 that there were around 30,000 converts to Islam in Belgium. The Pew Research Center estimated in 2016 that Muslims represented 7.6% of Belgium's population. However, this figure has not been verified, and the source, the Pew Research Center (an American think tank), has been shown to be inaccurate in the past.

Muslims are unevenly distributed around Belgium with the majority concentrated in the working class districts of major cities around the country. Almost 40% of Belgian Muslims live in the capital, Brussels. Approximately 39% live in Flanders and 21% live in Wallonia.

Religious censuses are forbidden in Belgium, so no accurate numbers about the ethnicity of Belgian Muslims can be given. Nationality cannot be used as an indicator of religion, since most people with roots in Islamic countries have taken on Belgian citizenship. Their children are born Belgian citizens and often cannot be distinguished from non-Muslims in the statistics.

== Branches and denominations ==
The overwhelming majority of Muslims in Belgium are Sunni. Isabelle Praile, vice-president of the Executive of the Muslims of Belgium, estimated in 2010 that roughly 10% of the Muslim Belgians were Shia.

=== Shia-Islam ===
The rise of Shiism in Belgium began with the arrival of Shiite Muslims from countries such as Lebanon, Iraq and Iran. Initially, the Shiite (Shia) presence in the country was limited to the capital, Brussels and Inverse, and now it has spread to other parts of the country, with the estimated Shiite population in Belgium at over 10,000. The majority of the population of Shiite Muslims in Belgium is from Lebanon, Iran, Syria, Iraq and other countries, and the Twelver Shiites (twelve Imams) in this country have five Islamic centers (and mosques).

Among the active centers/mosques of Shiite Muslims in Belgium (in Brussels):

- Ahl al-Bayt Center.
- Center of Thaqalain;
- Al-Rahman Mosque;
- Al-Huda Mosque;
- Imam Reza Mosque (Friday prayers are held in this mosque);

Etc.

Isabelle Praile is a Shiite Muslim figure and former vice-president of the Muslim Executive of Belgium. She was born in Anderlecht in 1966 and converted to Shiite Islam in 1985. She served as vice-president of the Muslim Executive from 2008 to 2014, representing Shiite Muslims. She became known publicly for defending Muslim women’s right to wear the veil and criticizing Belgium’s restrictions on face-covering veils as a threat to civil liberties.

== Identity ==
A 2011 Open Society Foundation report titled Muslim in Antwerp found that Muslims felt a "strong sense of belonging" to the neighborhood they lived in and the city of Antwerp but less to the country of Belgium in general.

== Religiosity ==
Surveys conducted 1994 and 1996 observed an increase in religiosity based on increased mosque participation, increased in frequent prayers among those surveyed, increased importance attached to a religious education, etc. This increase in religiosity was more visible in younger Muslims; however, other more recent studies show that while participation in religious activities among young Muslims is increasing, they are more likely to identify with Islam culturally as well as religiously.

A 2005 Université Libre de Bruxelles study estimated that about 87% of the Muslim population are "practicing Muslims." A 2009 survey found that the majority of Muslims in Belgium supported "separation between religion and state." A 2010 study found that while Muslims put great emphasis on religious freedom and the overwhelming majority stated people should be free to leave Islam if they wanted, they were less comfortable with the idea of Muslims marrying non-Muslims.

== Education and income ==
Various studies have concluded that the economic status of Muslims in Belgium is lower than that of non-Muslims. For instance, a 2007 study found unemployment among Turkish Belgians and Moroccan Belgians as 29–38%. A similar study in 1997 observed an under representation of these populations in higher earning jobs (3–17% compared to 25–31% for ethnic Belgians) and an over representation in lower paying jobs (59–60% compared to 38% for ethnic Belgians). Muslims also have less access to higher education with only 6–13% having a university degree. A 2009 analysis of the European 2006 PISA survey concluded inequality between minorities (including Muslims) and native Belgian students was one of the highest in all of Europe. The same analysis observed a "high degree of segregation in Belgian cities," which they stated was the main cause for the difference in school performance. Several studies have also concluded that high levels of discrimination in the work market is one of the leading causes of economic inequality among minorities in Belgium. Some politicians and commentators have implied economic differences between Muslims and non-Muslims were primarily the result of cultural failing or religion but a 2011 study by Agirdag et al. found no correlation between "religiosity" and "school performance."

== Culture ==
The three most popular music styles among Muslims in Belgium in 2011 were Nasheed, Al-Andalus (a Moroccan musical genre), and hip hop.

== Politics ==
Two members of governments formed after the 2014 Belgian federal election have a Muslim background but neither are practicing Muslims: Fadila Laanan and Rachid Madrane. Both are members of the Socialist Party. In 2009, Muslims occupied 19 out of the 89 seats in Brussels Regional Parliament.

In 2008, Le Centre d'Etude de la Vie Politique (CEVIPOL) published a study using exit polling data following the 2007 Belgian federal election. The study found that among Muslims in Brussels, 42.3% voted for the Socialist Party, 16.7% for the Humanist Democratic Centre, 14.7% for the Reformist Movement and 12.2% for Ecolo. The study also concluded that religiosity among Muslims did not have "a strong impact on their voting behaviour." In addition, the variable related to religious belonging or practice was not enough to explain the vote of the Muslim electorate. Other determining factors related to an often relatively low socioprofessional status, age (more than half of the Muslims interviewed were under age 34) and level of education (lower than the average of the other groups) were more integral to the firm attachment to the political left.

A 2009 study published the journal, Brussels Studies, concluded secondary school students in Brussels of Moroccan and Turkish origin showed a tendency to vote for the Socialist Party.

A September 2016 iVOX survey asked Belgian Muslims in Brussels and Flanders how they would vote in a hypothetical 2016 Belgian federal election. In Flanders, 26.8% of Muslims would vote for the Socialist Party Differently, 16.4% for Groen, 7.3% for the Workers' Party of Belgium, 6.9% for Christian Democratic and Flemish, and 6.9% for the New Flemish Alliance. In Brussels, 14.2% of Muslims would vote for Ecolo, 13.3% for the Socialist Party, 5.0% for the Reformist Movement, 4.2% for the People's Party, and 3.3% for the Humanist Democratic Centre.

A September 2016 iVOX survey of Belgian Muslims found that 53% agreed with the statement: "I have no issues with homosexuality". Approximately 30% disagreed with the statement while the rest refused to answer or were unsure.

=== Islam party ===
In 2012, a new political party named "ISLAM" was established with four candidates, which at the local elections of 2012 gained 2 seats, in the Molenbeek and Anderlecht districts of Brussels. Its goals are an Islamic state. Its policies include separating men and women on public transport and schools being forced to offer halal meat. Its policy is to replace the civil and penal laws of Belgium with Sharia law. In the local elections of 2018, the party lost its Molenbeek seat after winning less than 2% of votes there while its list in Anderlecht was ruled out, leaving the party with no more councillors.

== Religious infrastructure ==
In 1974, Islam was recognised as one of the subsidised religions in Belgium and the Muslim Executive of Belgium was founded in 1996. In 2006, the government gave €6.1 million (US$7.7 million) to Islamic groups. There are an estimated 328–380 mosques in the country.

In 2017, the Belgian department of justice commenced an investigation into the finances of mosques in Belgium and stated this was a priority.

== Controversies ==
=== Antisemitism ===
Over a hundred antisemitic attacks were recorded in Belgium in 2009, a 100% increase from the year before. The perpetrators were usually young males of immigrant Muslim background from the Middle East. In 2009, the Belgian city of Antwerp, often referred to as Europe's last shtetl, experienced a surge in antisemitic violence. Bloeme Evers-Emden, an Amsterdam resident and Auschwitz survivor, was quoted in the newspaper Aftenposten in 2010: "The antisemitism now is even worse than before the Holocaust. The antisemitism has become more violent. Now they are threatening to kill us."

A 2011 study of elementary school children in on Dutch-language schools in Brussels by a Belgian sociologist showed that about 50% of Muslim students in second and third grade could be considered anti-Semites, versus 10% of others.

The increased frequency of antisemitic attacks started in May 2014, when four people were killed in a shooting at the Belgian Jewish Museum in Brussels. Two days later, a young Muslim man entered the CCU (Jewish Cultural Center) while an event was taking place and shouted racist slurs. A month later, a school bus in Antwerp, that was driving 5-year-old Jewish children was stoned by a group of Muslim teens. Towards the end of August 2014, a 75-year-old Jewish woman was hit and pushed to the ground because of her Jewish-sounding surname.

=== Headscarf ===
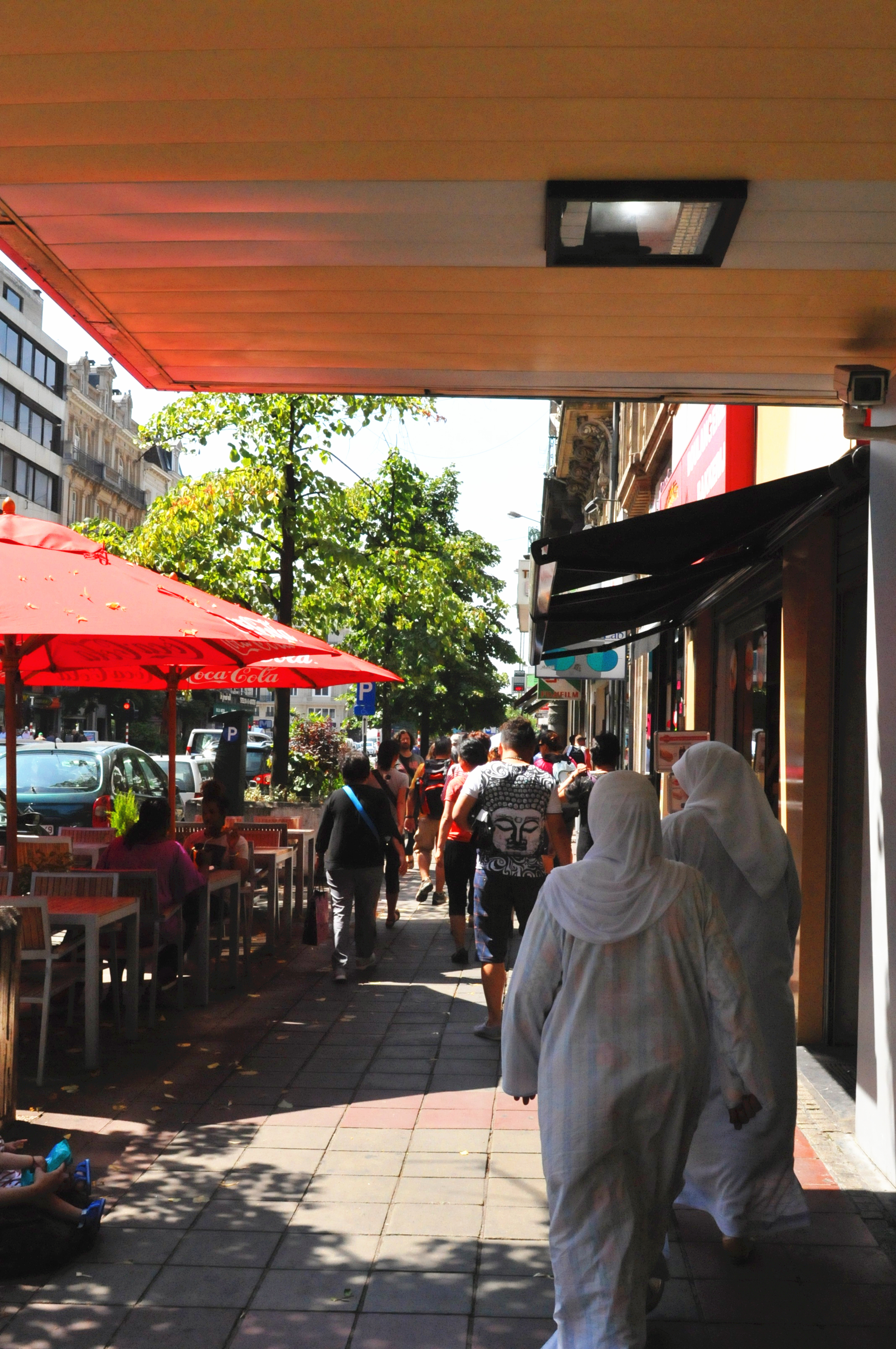
Brussels in 2013

In December 2004, the Belgian government said it was considering a ban on the wearing of any conspicuous religious symbols for civil servants.

In June 2005, the Antwerp court of appeal ruled that it was outside the jurisdiction of the state to determine whether Islam requires women to wear a headscarf and that girls in public schools have the right to do so. However, the school board also has the authority to restrict that right for organisational reasons, or for the good functioning of the school, though it must justify any such restrictions.

At the end of 2005, approximately twenty municipalities had issued a ban on walking the streets completely veiled. In a few cases women were fined €150 (US$190) for ignoring the ban. Under a 1993 executive order, persons in the streets must be identifiable. A veil which does not completely cover the body is however allowed.

Two Belgian Muslim women, Samia Belcacemi and Yamina Oussar, challenged a 2011 veil ban, asserting the law infringed on their freedom of religion. Both women said they voluntarily wore the niqab. In 2017, the European Court of Human Rights found that Belgium's ban on clothes that partially or fully cover the face in public was legal under the European Convention on Human Rights, "necessary in a democratic society," and that the law tried to protect "the rights and freedoms of others." In response to the upholding of the law, Belcacemi told the court that she continued to wear the niqab after it was banned but had eventually stopped because she could not afford fines or jail time. Ousser told the court that she had decided to stay at home and not go out in public anymore following the ban.

=== Salafism ===
In 2019, the State Security Service listed 100 organisations in Belgium which promoted Salafist ideology including mosques, community centers and educational establishments. These represented a minority in the Muslim community. Salafist ideology is considered extremist in Belgium. The security service also noted that espousing Salafist ideology does not imply involvement or support for terrorism.

According to the State Security Service (VSSE), salafist ideology is considered a threat against Belgian society in three ways:

- The promotion of Sharia law and the non-recognition of Belgian law where communitarianism (the individual is primarily a member of a culture and religion) threatens the constitution and democratic order. The combination of a Sharia legal system with communitarianism risks creating a parallel society.
- Inequality between the genders, a backwards view of women and the freedom of religion threatens civil liberties and fundamental rights. Given examples include repeated hatred towards Jews, the obligation of women to remain invisible in public spaces, the prohibition of genders mixing with each other and violent threats towards critics of Islam.
- As Salafists claim to speak for all Muslims, they create a distorted view of the Muslim community as a whole.

=== Radicalization ===
In March 2012 Alain Winants, the head of State Security Service in Belgium, estimated there were 1000 jihadist sympathizers in the country, of which about 100 were hardcore supporters.

==== Jihadists travelling abroad to wage jihad ====
In March 2012, the head of the security services stated that about a dozen had travelled to fight in jihadist groups overseas. In 2016, Belgium had more "foreign fighter" travellers per capita than any other Western nation.

Moroccan-born IS recruiter Khalid Zerkani recruited 72 young individuals with migrant backgrounds of whom most were petty criminals. He encouraged them to steal from non-Muslims in order to finance their journeys to join the caliphate.

Up to 2018, an estimated 450 individuals had travelled from Belgium to join the civil war in Syria and Iraq. Of those, 75 were linked to the Sharia4Belgium network. In July 2018, courts announced that Belgium had no obligation to bring children of Islamic State members to Belgium.

==== Terrorism ====
On 30 September 2003, a Belgian court convicted 18 men for involvement in a terror cell. Nizar Trabelsi was sentenced to 10 years for plotting a suicide attack against the NATO air base at Kleine Brogel. Tarek Maaroufi, of the Tunisian Combat Group, was sentenced to six years in prison for his role in a Brussels-based fake passport ring that supplied fake Belgian passports to the men who assassinated former Afghan Northern Alliance commander Ahmed Shah Massoud two days before the 11 September attacks.

In October 2004, a Belgian court sentenced eight Sunni Islamic militants to prison terms of up to 5 years for plotting attacks and for links to Al Qaeda. According to prosecutors, Saber Mohammed received three phone calls from senior Al Qaeda figure Khalid Sheikh Mohammed, which he was believed to be forwarding for colleagues. Also convicted was Tarek Maaroufi.

On 9 November 2005, Muriel Degauque, a Belgian convert to Sunni Islam, committed a suicide car bomb attack against a U.S. military convoy south of Baghdad.

On 24 May 2014, the Jewish Museum of Belgium in Brussels was attacked in an act linked to terrorism, with four casualties.

On 14 November 2015 Belgian police arrested 'several people' after searches linked to the attacks in Paris, more arrests expected as links to terrorists Investigation continues.

In July 2018, courts announced that Belgium had no obligation to bring children of Belgian Islamic State members to Belgium.

==== 2016 Brussels bombings ====
On the morning of Tuesday, 22 March 2016, three coordinated nail bombings occurred in Belgium: two at Brussels Airport in Zaventem, and one at Maalbeek metro station in Brussels. In these attacks, 35 victims and three suicide bombers were killed, and 316 people were injured. Another bomb was found during a search of the airport. Two suspects are on the run. The organisation Islamic State of Iraq and the Levant (ISIL) claimed responsibility for the attacks. The bombings were the deadliest attack on Belgium since World War II. The Belgian government declared three days of national mourning.

== Violence and discrimination ==
A 2011 survey by the Open Society found that 74% of Muslims were subject to "large to relatively large amounts of prejudice." In May 2002 a lone attacker broke into a family home around dawn, murdered two Muslim parents during their morning prayers and set the residential building on fire. Their 18 year old daughter escaped with two younger brothers, both of whom were severely injured. In February 2008, two young women of Maghreb origin were attacked in Liège after being verbally assaulted with ethnic slurs. One of the perpetrators had right-wing extremist affiliations. In 2011 the far right party Vlaams Belang organized a demonstration against the projected building of an Ahmadi mosque in the Uccle municipality of Brussels, allegedly out of fear for a "war of religions" between radical Sunnis and Ahmadis in the streets of the municipality. In the month following the 2016 Brussels bombing, the Belgian Counter-Islamophobia Collective (CCIB) recorded 36 hate crimes against Muslims. Belgian Muslim women are more subject to discrimination in areas of employment and education than men.

=== Opposition ===
The Brussels-based group, Bruxelloise et Voilée was founded in March 2015 and is led by young Belgian Muslim women. It lists its goal as "promot[ing] a multicultural society by fighting against discrimination and stereotypes, in particular against Muslim veiled women." The CCIB records and reports rates of Islamophobia, and campaigning against anti-Muslim bigotry in Belgium.

The "Open Schools 4 Women" campaign led by the CCIB was launched in September 2016, represented via the hashtag #OpenSchools4Women, and aims to promote Muslim women to wear the headscarf in schools. Similarly, the "Open Job Testing" project, backed by Brussels MP Didier Gosuin, was launched by CCIB in October 2016 with aims to address the obstacles to employment faced by individuals when accessing the job market and compile statistical evidence pertaining to discrimination in the labour market. The European Network Against Racism presented its work to combat growing anti-Muslim prejudice.

Following the passage of Executive Order 13769 by U.S. President Donald Trump, a student protest took place in Brussels at the Place de la Bourse/Beursplein in solidarity with Muslim refugees and Muslim Belgians.

== Notable Belgian Muslims ==
- Jaouad Achab, taekwondo practitioner
- Lubna Azabal, actress
- Mimount Bousakla, politician
- Mousa Dembélé, football player
- Marouane Fellaini, football player
- Hadise, singer
- Adnan Januzaj, football player
- Saïd El Khadraoui, politician
- Zakia Khattabi, politician
- Yahyah Michot, academic
- Jamal Ben Saddik, kickboxer
- Zeynep Sever, former Miss Belgium
- Adil Benrlitom, Counter-Strike Player

== See also ==
- Islam in Europe
- Religion in Belgium
- Moroccans in Belgium
- Turks in Belgium
- List of Turkish Belgians
- Abdullah al-Ahdal
- Centre for Equal Opportunities and Opposition to Racism

== Sources ==
- Husson, Jean-François (30 October 2015). "Belgium". In Scharbrodt, Oliver; Akgönül, Samim; Alibašić, Ahmet; Nielsen, Jørgen; Racius, Egdunas (eds.). Yearbook of Muslims in Europe, Volume 7. BRILL. ISBN 9789004308909.
- Zibouh, Fatima (5 December 2011). "The political representation of Muslims in Brussels". Brussels Studies. 55. ISSN 2031-0293.
- Humo's grote Islam-enquête (1): 'Eén op de vijf moslims heeft begrip voor IS' (PDF). HUMO. 11 October 2016.
- Ebner, Julia (2017), The Rage: The Vicious Circle of Islamist and Far-right Extremism, London: IB Tauris, ISBN 9781788310321
