= Nadterechny =

Nadterechny (masculine), Nadterechnaya (feminine), or Nadterechnoye (neuter) may refer to:

- Nadterechny District, a district of the Chechen Republic, Russia
- Nadterechnoye, a rural locality (a selo) in the Chechen Republic, Russia
