= Female suicide bomber =

Woman who carries out a suicide attack

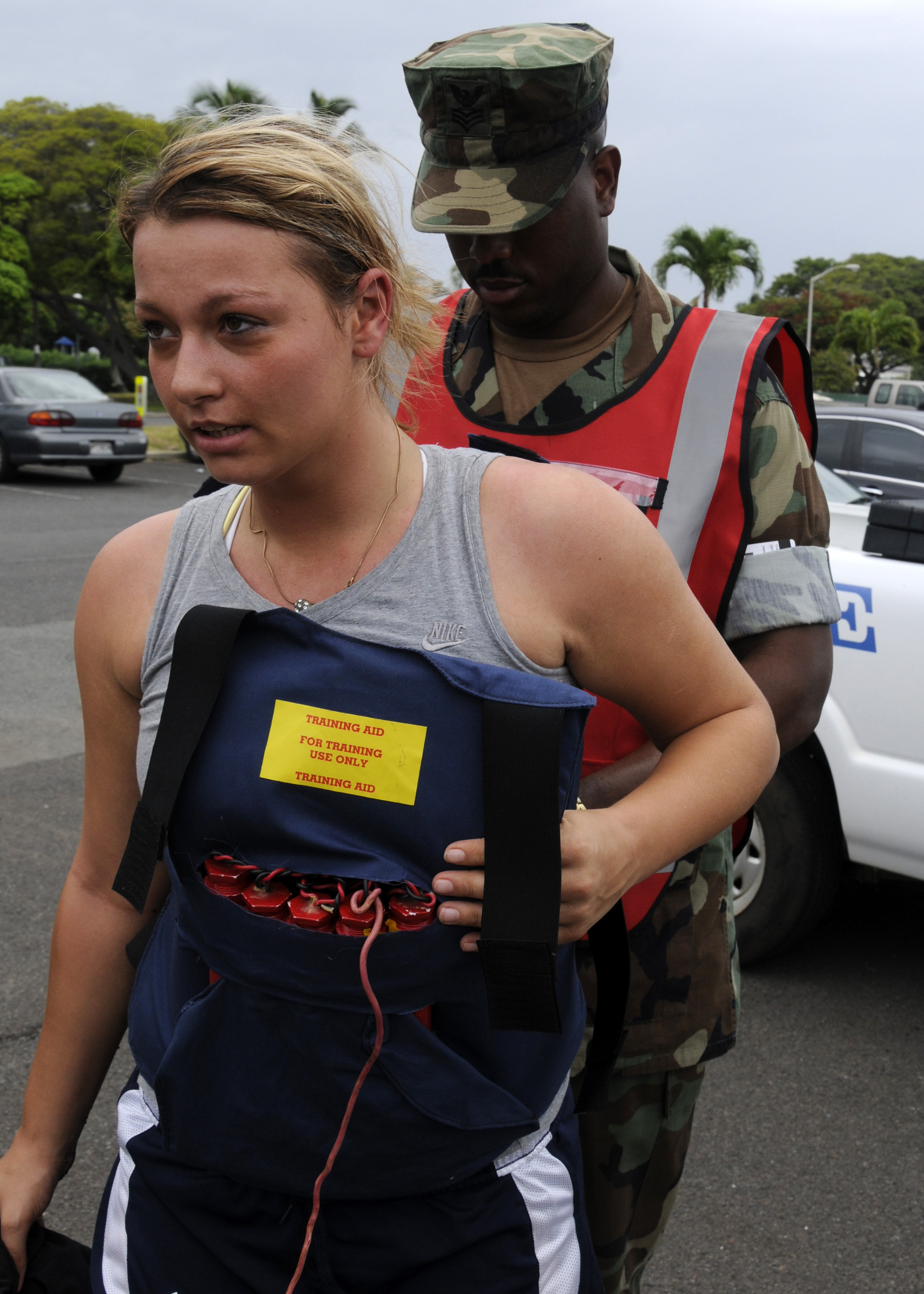
A U.S. Navy servicewoman poses as a captured female suicide bomber during the OPFOR exercise in Pearl Harbor, Hawaii

Female suicide bombers are women who undertake suicide attacks. Suicide bombers are normally viewed as male political radicals, but since the 1960s, female suicide attacks have been on the rise. Through 1985–2006, 15% of all suicide attacks were conducted by female suicide bombers.

There are many organizations, such as Boko Haram (which is the first group to use women in a majority of their suicide bombings and surpassed the Tamil Tigers in using more female suicide bombers than any other terrorist group in history), Al-Shabaab, ISIS and the Al Aqsa Martyrs Brigade, that recently started using women as tools in their attacks, since they are normally viewed as less of a threat than their male counterparts. This includes women having the element of surprise, a hesitancy to search women, increased publicity for female suicide bombing attacks, and the female stereotype as non-violent.

Research shows that female suicide bombers tend to replace depleted male cadres and tend to exhibit little active participation or inadequate training. An analysis of suicide attacks over the period 1985-2017 finds that female suicide bombers inflict fewer fatalities than their male counterparts.

== Background ==
Women have an extensive and complex history in political violence. While the typical terrorist of the 1960s tended to be an educated male from an upper-middle-class background, many left-wing terrorist groups in the 1960s and 1970s had prominent women active within these groups. Ulrike Meinhof, a German left-wing terrorist and journalist, co-founded the Red Army Faction and participated in a range of bombings and bank robberies. The Popular Front for the Liberation of Palestine (PFLP)'s Leila Khaled is considered to be the first woman to hijack an airplane, drawing international attention. Fusako Shigenobu founded and led the Japanese Red Army, a communist militant group that conducted hijackings and massacres. A number of Italian women were active in Italian terrorist organizations between 1970 and 1984. Women played fundamental roles in Puerto Rican nationalist movements such as the Puerto Rican Armed Forces of National Liberation (FLAN) and the Boricua Popular Army (Los Macheteros), two groups designated as terrorist organizations. Women served visible roles in American groups, such as the Symbionese Liberation Army. Women also served as mobilizing agents for Weather Underground, recruiting people into the organization. Women have been more active in left-wing groups as these groups' ideologies tend to be more conducive to women's participation in combatant and other non-traditional roles.

Organizations have differing stances on female suicide bombers. For example, in 2002, the spiritual leader of Hamas "categorically renounced the use of women as suicide bombers". In early 2002, he reported that "Hamas was far from enthusiastic about the inclusion of women in warfare, for reasons of modesty." This stance shifted in 2004, when the first female suicide bomber was used. Officials exclaimed that the act was a "significant evolution in our fight. The male fighters face many obstacles ... women are like the reserve army―when there is a necessity, we use them." The Liberation Tigers of Tamil Eelam attracted thousands of women and their militarization shaped women's identity from the "traditional ideal of the auspicious, fecund wife to the androgynous Armed Virgin". Rajini Thiranagama stated, "One cannot but be inspired when one sees the women of the LTTE in the night with their AKs slung over the shoulder. ... One cannot but admire the dedication and toughness of their training. ... One could see the nationalist fervor and the romantic vision of women in arms defending the nation."

=== Characteristics of female suicide bombers ===
There is much variation among female suicide bombers. A number of studies have attempted to compare suicide attackers across different suicide groups. It was found that groups that used women the least were Islamist fundamentalist groups. When dealing with age, female suicide bombers followed the same age trend as men, typically falling within the early to mid 20s. They also tend to have more secular ties than presumed. Some are married while others are widows. Socioeconomic status also varies among female attackers.

Women's involvement is mediated differently than men's; they are more likely to be involved through personal contacts or family members, while men's process of involvement is more likely to stem from movement affiliation and disenchantment with nonviolent forms of political activism. Differences in men and women's need for revenge (and subsequent use of suicide attacks) has been studied, with inconsistent findings reported. Some argue men are more vengeful than women, while others find no such claims.

=== Examples ===
- In 1780, an Indian woman named Kuyili applied ghee and oil onto her body and set herself ablaze. She then jumped into an armoury of the East India Company, causing it to explode. This suicide attack helped to secure victory for her queen, Velu Nachiyar, in the battle to secure freedom for Sivaganga.
- In a meeting about ways to assassinate General Evelyn Barker, the British Army commander in Mandatory Palestine, a young woman volunteered to do the assassination as a suicide bombing. They refer to it as a "Let my soul die with the Philistines" proposal (Hebrew: תמות נפשי עם פלשתים) as a reference to the words of Samson in (Judges 16:30), or a "Samson option". On that occasion other members of the group allegedly rejected her offer. She also had a physical disability that might have made her unable to carry out the plan the group had in mind. The Lehi memorialize her among their martyrs and fallen combatants (Hebrew: הללי לח"י), but her cause of death is not described. (Note: The Lehi did kill one of their own young men, and a teenage boy from the Irgun, in a joint suicide operation that they attempted to orchestrate in Jerusalem Central Prison.)
- Sana'a Mehaidli, a 16-year-old member of the Syrian Social Nationalist Party (SSNP/PPS), a pro-Syrian Lebanese organization, is believed to have been the first female suicide bomber. On 9 April 1985, she blew up herself and a truck of explosives next to an Israeli convoy in Lebanon during the Israeli occupation of South Lebanon. She worked at a video store where she recorded her will, saying "I am very comfortable with carrying out this operation. I choose to do this because I am fulfilling my duty towards my land and my people ... Now I am loving my country, sacrificing my life and respecting the people of the south".
- Thenmozhi Rajaratnam (born Kalaivani Rajaratnam; soubriquet: "Dhanu") is thought to have been a member of the Tamil militant organization Liberation Tigers of Tamil Eelam (LTTE) in Sri Lanka, was involved in the assassination of Rajiv Gandhi, the former Prime Minister of India, and sixteen other bystanders in 1991. She had allegedly been raped by Indian Peace Keeping Force soldiers and her four brothers were killed. The LTTE unit known as the Black Tigers committed suicide bombing attacks, most of which were done by women. A female suicide bomber attempted to kill Sri Lanka's Army Commander Sarath Fonseka in 2006. Fonseka survived, but seven others were killed in the attack. Sri Lanka's Fisheries Minister and former militant Douglas Devananda was the target of a female suicide bomber in 2007. She detonated the bomb during a body check.
- Wafa Idris detonated a 22-pound bomb in the center of Jerusalem outside a shoe store on Jaffa Road, killing herself and Pinhas Tokatli (81), and injuring more than 100 others. The attack took place on 27 January 2002 but the identity of the bomber was not confirmed until 30 January 2002. Idris carried the bomb in a backpack, rather than strapped to her body. Since, prior to this attack, women had only helped plant bombs, the use of a backpack and the lack of the usual note or video led to confusion regarding her suicide motives and speculation that she did not intend to detonate the bomb, but that the explosion was accidental. However, after investigation of the explosion, Israel declared Idris a suicide bomber around 9 February 2002. Prior to this Idris called for an "Army of Roses". She served under Al Aqsa Martyrs Brigade. Wafa was born in a refugee camp, and her father died when she was a child. During the First Intifada, she served on the refugee camp's women's committee, helping prisoners' families and distributing food. When she delivered a stillborn and was told she would never be able to carry a baby to full-term, her husband divorced her.
- Muriel Degauque was a Belgian convert to Islam who died in a suicide car bomb attack on 9 November 2005 against a U.S. military convoy in Iraq. One soldier was wounded. She originally worked at a bakery and after marrying a Muslim man, she moved to Iraq and became radicalized.
- Zeynep Kınacı was a Kurdish member of the Kurdistan Workers' Party (PKK) and known for having committed its 1996 Tunceli bombing.
- The 2010 Moscow Metro bombings were suicide bombings carried out by two female Islamist terrorists from the Caucasus during the morning rush hour of March 29, 2010, at two stations of the Moscow Metro (Lubyanka and Park Kultury), with roughly 40 minutes in between. At least 40 people were killed, and over 100 injured. The women were identified as Dzhennet Abdurakhmanova and Mariam Sharipova.
- On 14 February 2011, a female suicide bomber killed a Russian serviceman and wounded four others at a Dagestan police station in Gubden, a village around 150 km (100 miles) south of the provincial capital of Makhachkala.
- Blasts from two female suicide bombers at a crowded fish market in Nigeria's northeastern city of Maiduguri killed at least 20 people on 22 June 2015.
- On 23 December 2016, the first female suicide bomber in Bangladesh detonated her explosive during a police raid while holding her 7-year-old daughter in one hand and chanting: "We will go to heaven! We will go to heaven!" She was identified as Jebunnahar Islam Shila.
- In 2018, in Surabaya, East Java, Indonesia, a Muslim family, composed of three men (father Dita Oepriarto and sons Firman and Yusuf, aged 15 and 17) and three women (mother Puji Kuswati, Indonesia's first female suicide bomber, and daughters Famela and Fadhila, aged 8 and 12), died carrying out bombings at three Catholic and Christian churches, killing 12 people and injuring at least 40.
- On 26 April 2022, Shari Baloch, a 30-year-old science teacher and mother of two, detonated her explosives in the University of Karachi in Pakistan, killing three Chinese teachers. The separatist militant group Balochistan Liberation Army (BLA) claimed responsibility for the incident, claiming her as the organisation's first female suicide bomber.

== Causes and reasons ==
There are a number of reasons as to why female suicide bombers are used by groups. Terrorists use bombers as they are cheaper than purchasing arms. They are considered a low risk weapon and require low technology. They do not require much training, do not leave much of a trace behind, have the element of surprise, have easier access to targeted populations as well as soft targets, and tend to frighten the general population. As female combatants are seen as less likely to engage in lethal actions and can thus avoid suspicion, they are regarded as ideal combatants. Dress and gender stereotypes are often utilized by women to bypass security defenses. For example, women who appear pregnant appropriate related expectations and stereotypes to their benefit, discouraging invasive body searchers. Women may also "westernize" their appearance in an attempt at covering their actions and avoiding detection. Women are also deployed as suicide bombers as they tend to "elicit greater public sympathy and publicity for an organization". By some research, female bombers receive eight times more press coverage than their male counterparts.

Insurgent groups also face pressure when it comes to recruiting members, causing the group to expand their bases to sustain the group's position. It has been argued that the introduction of women and girls into combat "generally came about in response to logistical demands: the mounting number of casualties, the intensified crackdowns by government, and the ability to escape detection more easily than men". An example of this was in January 2002 when Sheikh Ahmed Yassin, the spiritual leader of Hamas, renounced the use of female bombers. Later on in the same year, Hamas was not enthusiastic about adding women into their ranks. Hamas subsequently reversed their stance, deploying their first female suicide bomber in January 2004. On average, it is calculated that terrorist groups that use suicide bombing as a tactic wait around 13.5 years before employing women. However, women are reported to have higher kill rates than men, on average killing four times as many people as men do.

Terrorist and insurgent groups may also appropriate media coverage to benefit from the portrayal of female suicide bombers. Women's media portrayal may help various organizations recruit and motivate men, and coverage of women in the media allows groups to differentiate themselves from one another. It also may help deliver group-based messages. For example, media coverage may highlight that the group, by using women, had been driven to extreme measures. Media attention on female suicide bombers tends to examine emotional explanations for women's involvement, as opposed to ideological justifications.

== Individual motivations ==
There are different causes and reasons why female suicide bombers perform these deadly actions. For one, many cite personal feelings of sacrifice in conducting such missions. The missions become more esteemed to the public when they are framed as forms of sacrifice. Society would be "hard pressed to accept, that a female who offers her life in this context is seen as engaging in the most profound form of selflessness". Other research suggests that women resort to terrorism to "redeem their fallen reputations, such as being barren, divorced, defiled, unchaste, and so on". Struggling for the pursuit of freedom through the LTTE can be seen as a way in which women can redeem themselves. Tamil rape victims tend to be prohibited from marriage and childbearing. Conceptualizing female bombers as mothers allows suicide bombings to serve as offerings for women who cannot become mothers.

In the literature on female suicide bombers, exploitation of women is a distinctive factor that separates them from male suicide bombers. Research has examined cases of women's exploitation by their own families, often for monetary compensation.

Women can also be motivated by political/and or historical contexts to take action against their enemy. For example, in the context of the Israeli–Palestinian conflict, it has been noted that Palestinian female suicide bombers are often motivated by anti-Zionism and the Israeli occupation of their homeland to take action. According to Palestinian legal scholar Noura Erakat, the "Israeli military occupation [is] a significant, if not the most significant, factor contributing to the subjugation of Palestinian women's rights." They are often motivated by the politics of their environment to take action in this situation. Western feminist critic Amal Amireh notes examples of how the women exercise their political agency in the conflict, including the fact that the bomber often declares in public her political group and nationalism, as well as the fact that they commit the act in public as a spectacle to be observed. There is also a case to be made toward religion/political indoctrination. Some recruiters, like the LTTE, would concentrate on recruiting orphans due to their young age, making it much easier to indoctrinate and condition.

Individual motivations to become suicide bombers vary. Motives include "to avenge a personal loss, to redeem the family name, to escape a life of sheltered monotony and achieve fame, or to equalize the patriarchal societies in which they live". The death of a relative triggers the decision to commit a suicide attack. Some women join to seek revenge. For example, studies have shown that some women join the Liberation Tigers of Tamil Eelam seeking revenge against crimes the government has committed against the group, from disappearances to torture. Government oppression has only emboldened the LTTE, and women have increasingly become more publicly involved.

In Chechnya, female bombers originally became involved for more personal reasons, avenging the deaths of Chechen male relatives killed by Russian forces. They are referred to as "Black Widows" because many were the wives, mothers, sisters, or female relatives of men killed in battle. The activities of the Black Widows are regarded to support the theory that suicide bombings may alter societal gender norms. With militant involvement usually seen as being performed by men, engaging in violent actions counters notions of women's traditional roles, such as raising children. Clara Beyler, a counter-terrorism analyst writes that "There is a difference between men and women suicide attackers: women consider combat as a way to escape the predestined life that is expected of them. When women become human bombs, their intent is to make a statement not only in the name of a country, a religion, a leader, but also in the name of their gender".

== Effects ==
=== Deadliness ===
According to a 2021 study, female suicide attacks "are more deadly in countries where women are largely absent from the workforce, civil society, and protest organizations". However, "female attack lethality is declining with time, suggesting that security forces eventually adapt to women's participation in terrorism".

=== Organizations of female suicide bombers ===
The Al-Aqsa Martyrs' Brigades is a known terrorist organization that has trained many female suicide bombers since their uprising as political weapons. In January 2002, the group claimed responsibility for the first female suicide bombing attack inside of Israel, in efforts to push Israel settlers out of West Bank and to form an entirely Palestinian state. The group is known to be most active in the Gaza Strip, but also attacks inside of Israel and the West Bank.

=== Chechnya ===
The Shahidka, commonly referred to as the "Black Widows" are a group of Islamist Chechen separatist suicide bombers. Khava Barayeva blew herself up at a Russian Army outpost on June 7, 2000. In 2001, Aiza Gazuyeva killed Russian general Gaidar Gadzhiyev in a suicide bombing, the first female suicide bombing of the Chechen insurgency. The group carried out the Moscow theater hostage crisis and a number of them were involved in the Beslan school siege. A bombing that killed 10 people at Rizhskaya metro station in Moscow was thought to be carried out by a woman who was identified as a Beslan school captor. The 2004 Russian aircraft bombings are believed to be carried out by female bombers. Two of the perpetrators of the 2010 Moscow Metro bombings were women; Dzhanet Abdullayeva, who was married to a militant, and Maryam Sharipova. The October 2013 Volgograd bus bombing was carried out by a woman.

=== Palestinian bombers ===
On the same day Darine Abu Aisha committed a suicide bombing, Sheikh Ahmed Yassin, the religious leader of Islamist militant group Hamas, issued a fatwa, or religious rule, that gave permission to women to participate in suicide attacks as well as listing the rewards in "paradise" that these female martyrs would receive upon their deaths. He also promised Hamas would send many female suicide bombers to strike Israelis. Reactions to this in the Islamic world were mixed. While many hailed the female suicide bomber and urged full involvement of all in Jihad, some criticized the cruelty of tearing mothers from their children and sending them to explode themselves.

Notable female Palestinian suicide bombers include:

- Wafa Idris – first suicide bomber (bombing date: January 27, 2002)
- Darine Abu Aisha – second suicide bomber (bombing date: February 27, 2002)
- Ayat al-Akhras – third suicide bomber (bombing date: March 29, 2002)
- Andalib Suleiman – fourth suicide bomber (bombing date: April 12, 2002)
- Hiba Da'arma – fifth suicide bomber (bombing date: May 19, 2003)
- Hanadi Jaradat – sixth suicide bomber (bombing date: October 4, 2003)
- Reem Al-Reyashi – eighth suicide bomber (bombing date: January 15, 2004). Al-Reyashi, a 22-year-old mother of two, detonated an explosive pack at the Erez crossing point on the frontier of the Gaza Strip. Two Israeli soldiers, a policeman and a civilian security worker were killed. Seven other Israelis and four Palestinians were injured.
