= French Council =

French Council may refer to:

- French Council of the Muslim Faith, a non-profit group created in 2003, made up of 25 Regional Councils of the Muslim Faith
- French Economic, Social and Environmental Council, formerly French Economic and Social Council, a consultative assembly
