= Jaffa Street bombing =

2002 suicide bombing in Jerusalem, Israel

2002 Jaffa Street bombing
- Part of the Second Intifada militancy campaign
- The attack site
- Location: 31°46′59″N 35°13′05″E; Jerusalem
- Date: January 27, 2002; 24 years ago
- Attack type: Suicide bombing
- Deaths: 2 people: 1 Israeli civilian; 1 Palestinian bomber
- Injuries: 100+ civilians
- Perpetrator: Al-Aqsa Martyrs Brigade claimed responsibility
- Assailant: Wafa Idris

The 2002 Jaffa Street bombing was a suicide bombing which occurred on January 27, 2002, in the center of Jerusalem. One civilian was killed and about 100 civilians injured.

== The attack ==
On Sunday, January 27, 2002, the 28-year-old Palestinian suicide bomber Wafa Idris, who worked for the Palestinian Red Crescent in Ramallah, managed to pass through the Qalandiya checkpoint while she was driving a Red Crescent ambulance and dressed in the organization's uniform, while the explosive device was hidden in the ambulance. Although the original plan was that she would pass the explosive device to a designated person in Israel, Idris eventually decided to blow up the explosive device by herself, and as a result she updated her operative Abu Talal of her decision using her cell phone. She carried the bomb in a backpack, rather than strapped to her body. She approached a shoe store located on the Jaffa Street in the center of Jerusalem and detonated the 22-pound explosive device at the entrance to the store. An 81-year-old Israeli man was killed immediately from the blast and more than 100 people were injured.

== The assailant ==
Shortly after the attack, before the bomber had been identified, Hezbollah's TV channel reported that the bomber was named Shahanaz Al Amouri, from An-Najah National University in Nablus. A few days later the Al-Aqsa Martyrs Brigade claimed responsibility for the attack and identified the bomber as Wafa Idris.

Idris was born in the Am'ari refugee camp in 1975. Her father died when she was a child. She was about 12 years old when the First Intifada started in 1987. According to her relatives, Idris served on the Am'ari refugee camp's women's committee during the first intifada, where she assisted in food distribution at times of curfew, provided social support and helped prisoners' families. Idris married her first cousin when she was sixteen. She delivered a stillborn baby when she was 23 and was told that she would never be able to carry a baby to full term. Her husband divorced her and she moved back to live with her mother, a brother and his wife and five children. She then began volunteering for the Red Crescent Society and trained as a medic. According to the Red Crescent's coordinator of Emergency Response Services, Idris volunteered every Friday, the peak time during the intifada because of frequent riots after prayer, and for two or three days in a row when there were riots during the week.

== See also ==
- List of terrorist incidents, 2002
