= 2003 Krylya festival bombing =

Chechen suicide bombing at a music festival in Moscow

- Part of Spillover of the Second Chechen War and Islamic terrorism in Europe
- Location of Moscow Oblast in Russia
- Location: 55°49′25″N 37°26′05″E; Tushino airfield, Moscow, Russia
- Date: 5 July 2003
- Attack type: Suicide bombing
- Deaths: 15 (+2 terrorists)
- Injuries: 60
- Perpetrator: Riyad-us Saliheen

On July 5, 2003, a terrorist attack occurred just outside of the gates of the Krylya (Russian: Крылья, lit. Wings) rock festival at the Tushino Airfield in Moscow. killing 15 people and injuring up to 60 more.

Two Chechen shahidka (Muslim female suicide bombers) committed suicide attacks at the entrance to the festival, which was being held at the Tushino airfield in north-western Moscow (the primary venue for the festival). The first bomber, 20-year-old Zulikhan Elikhadzhiyeva, detonated her bomb which only partially exploded, killing only herself. Only a few meters away from where Elikhadzhiyeva had detonated, 26-year-old Zinaida Aliyeva detonated her explosives 15 minutes later, killing 11 people on the spot while at least 60 people were injured, with four of them later dying in hospital. Russian authorities stated that had the suicide bombers been able to enter the airfield, the casualties would have been significantly higher. They opened a criminal investigation into the attack.

The Tushino bombing was part of a string of suicide attacks in Russia that had occurred within the previous four months, killing 165 people in total, in the context of the Second Chechen War.

== See also ==
- Suicide attacks in the North Caucasus conflict
