= Muslim Executive of Belgium =

- Executief van de Moslims van België (Dutch); Exécutif des musulmans de Belgique (French)
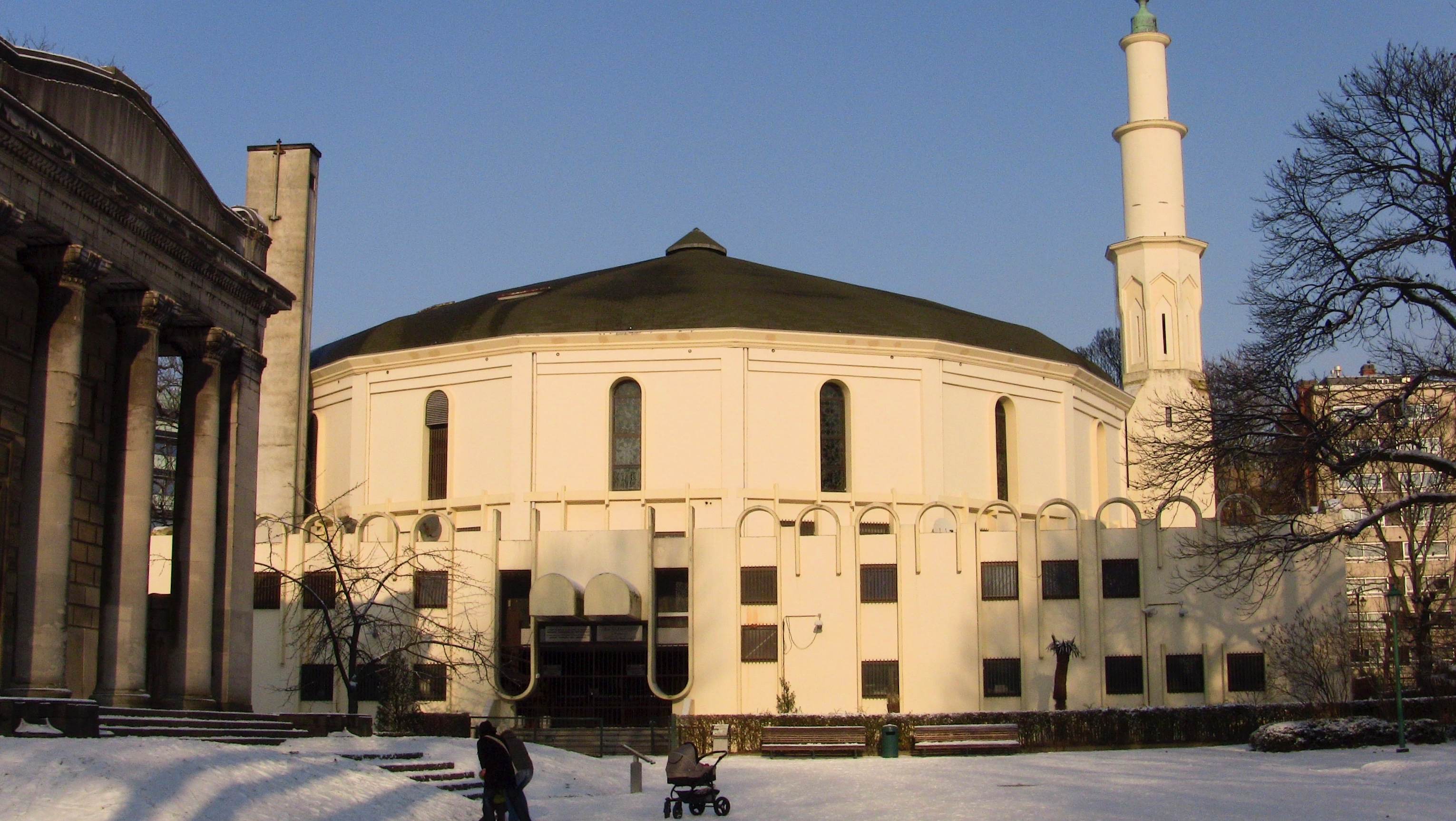

Executive overview
- Formed: 3 July 1996
- Jurisdiction: Belgium
- Executive executive: Shemsettin Ugurlu, President

The Muslim Executive of Belgium (Dutch: Executief van de Moslims van België; French: Exécutif des musulmans de Belgique) is the official Muslim interlocutor of the Belgian federal government for the implementation of the 19 July 1974 law recognizing Islam as one of the subsidized religious or secular communities in Belgium according to the law of 4 March 1870.

It was set up by a royal decree on 3 July 1996. The group is close to Moroccan officialdom.

In 2018, the Great Mosque of Brussels came under the control of the Muslim Executive of Belgium after the Belgian government terminated the concession of Saudi Arabia.

== Presidents ==
- Dr. Didier-Yacine Beyens (Belgian convert; physician) 1996-1999.
- Nordin Maloujahmoun (male French-speaking dual Belgian-Moroccan citizen; fiscal inspector) 1999-2003.
- Mohamed Boulif (male French-speaking dual Belgian-Moroccan citizen; economist in a Luxemburg bank) 2003-2005 (ousted by the Justice Minister Laurette Onkelinx, who provoked new elections before the Assembly's term).
- Coskun Beyazgül (male French-speaking dual Belgian-Turkish citizen; Diyanet's official), with as vice-presidents Kissi Benjelloul (male French-speaking Moroccan with a French passport; butcher) and Hacer Düzgün (female Dutch-speaking Belgian with dual Belgian-Turkish citizenship; religion teacher) 2005-2008.
- Shemsettin Ugurlu (male French-speaking dual Belgian-Turkish citizen; religion teacher), with as vice-president Isabelle (Soumaya) Praile (Belgian convert; religion teacher; Shi'a Muslim) and Mehmet Üstün (male Dutch-speaking Belgian with dual Belgian-Turkish citizenship).

== See also ==
- Central Council of Muslims in Germany
- Council on American-Islamic Relations
- French Council of the Muslim Faith
- Great Mosque of Brussels
- Islam in Belgium
- Islamic Commission of Spain
- Muslim Council of Britain
- Muslim Council of Sweden
