= 2003 Znamenskoye suicide bombing =

Truck bombing in Chechnya

Coordinates: 43.676°N 45.127°E

- Part of the Second Chechen War
- Location of Chechnya in Russia
- Location: Znamenskoye, Nadterechny District, Chechnya, Russia
- Date: 12 May 2003
- Attack type: Suicide attack
- Deaths: 59
- Injuries: 200

The Znamenskoye Grozny suicide bombing happened on May 12, 2003, in Znamenskoye in Chechnya, when three rebel suicide bombers, including two women, drove a truck bomb into a local government administration and the Federal Security Service of the Russian Federation (FSB) directorate complex, killing at least 59 people and injuring about 200, mostly civilians.

The complex contained the republican headquarters of the FSB. The mainstream wing of the rebels led by Aslan Maskhadov denied involvement and condemned the attack.

A Chechen warlord Khozh-Akhmed Dushayev was blamed for organizing the blast. No formal charges were ever brought and Dushayev was killed in Ingushetia in June 2003.
