= Wafa Idris =

Palestinian suicide bomber

Wafa Idris وفاء إدريس
- An undated photograph of Wafa Idris taken during the first intifada. The image was distributed to the media following her death and became prominent in the Palestinian Territories and pro-Palestinian demonstrations in the Arab countries.
- Born: 1975; Am'ari Refugee Camp, West Bank, Palestine
- Died: January 27, 2002 (aged 26–27); Jerusalem
- Occupation: Red Crescent volunteer
- Known for: First Palestinian female suicide bomber
- Parent: from Ramla

Wafa Idris (Arabic: وفاء إدريس 1975 – January 27, 2002), a Palestinian Red Crescent volunteer, was the first female suicide bomber in the Israeli–Palestinian conflict. She killed herself while committing the Jaffa Street bombing during the Second Intifada. At the time of her suicide, Idris was a 28-year-old divorcee and lived in the Am'ari Refugee Camp in Ramallah.

== Early life ==
Idris' parents were refugees who lived in the Am'ari Refugee Camp having fled Ramla in 1948 during the 1948 Arab–Israeli War. She was born in the refugee camp in 1975. Her father died when she was eight years old. As a child she failed at school, and dropped out. She was about 12 years old when the First Intifada started in 1987. According to her relatives, Idris served on the Am'ari refugee camp's women's committee during the first intifada, where she assisted in food distribution at times of curfew, provided social support and helped prisoners' families. Her eldest brother was a leader of the Fatah faction of Yasir Arafat.

Idris was married to her first cousin when she was 16 years old. She delivered a stillborn baby in the seventh month of pregnancy when she was 23, and was told that she would never be able to carry a baby to full term. Local patriarchal norms devalued her position in life because she was unable to have children. A close friend of hers said that at that point she "lost the will to live". Her husband told her he wanted to take a second wife as their religion allows. When she objected he divorced her, and married another woman two weeks later, with whom he had two children. After he had his first child, she sought to return to him, but he said she could not. Her mother said "Wafa knew she could never marry again because a divorced woman is tainted."

Her husband sent her back to her childhood home to live with her mother, a brother, and his wife and five children. She then began volunteering for the Red Crescent Society and trained as a medic. According to the Red Crescent's coordinator of Emergency Response Services, Idris volunteered every Friday, the peak time during the intifada because of frequent riots after prayer, and for two or three days in a row when there were riots during the week.

== Attack ==
On 27 January 2002, during the Second Intifada, Idris was transported to Jerusalem by a Red Crescent ambulance, whose driver was part of the plot, and killed herself while committing the Jaffa Street bombing. Idris, wearing a Red Crescent uniform, then detonated a 22-pound (10 kilogram) bomb made up of TNT packed into pipes, in the center of Jerusalem outside a shoe store on the busy main shopping street Jaffa Road. The explosion killed her and Pinhas Tokatli (81), and injured more than 100 others. The identity of the bomber wasn't confirmed until three days later on 30 January 2002.

Idris carried the bomb in a backpack, rather than strapped to her body. Since, prior to this attack, women had only helped plant bombs, the use of a backpack and the lack of the usual note or video led to confusion regarding her suicide motives and speculation that she did not intend to detonate the bomb, but that the explosion was accidental. However, after investigation of the explosion, Israel declared Idris a suicide bomber around 9 February 2002.

== Reaction ==
Shortly after the bombing, before the bomber was identified, Hezbollah's TV channel reported that the bomber was named Shahanaz Al Amouri, from An-Najah National University in Nablus. Al-Aqsa Martyrs Brigade, the military wing of Fatah, claimed responsibility for the attack a few days after the attack, saying Idris had carried it out in response to Israeli military actions.

According to her mother, although Idris' three brothers were members of Fatah, she herself was not known to be an activist with any Palestinian militant group; her mother later described her as a martyr, and said she hoped that other women would follow in her path. Her friends speculated that she was driven to commit the suicide bombing by the failure of her marriage. The Arabic London-based international newspaper al-Sharq al-Awsat theorized that her divorce and barrenness had led her to commit a suicide attack.

As the first Palestinian woman to undertake such an attack, Idris received more international and regional media attention than Palestinian male bombers and two of the three Palestinian women bombers who followed her in 2002. The exception was Ayat al-Akhras, the third and youngest Palestinian female suicide bomber. The bombing created intense interest in the Arab media, with many newspapers describing Idris as a hero and a nationalist. An editorial published in Egypt's weekly newspaper Al-Sha'ab a few days after the bombing stated, in part, "It is a woman who teaches you today a lesson in heroism, who teaches you the meaning of jihad, and the way to die a martyr's death ... It is a woman who has shocked the enemy with her thin, meager and weak body. It is a woman who blew herself up, and with her exploded all the myths about woman's weakness, submissiveness, and enslavement."

== Legacy ==
In March 2011, Palestinian Media Watch reported that the Fatah-affiliated Al-Amari Palestinian youth center announced a football tournament named after Idris.

== See also ==
- Andalib Suleiman, 17-year-old female perpetrator of a 2002 suicide bombing in a Jerusalem marketplace
- Ayat al-Akhras, 18- or 16-year-old female perpetrator of a 2002 suicide bombing at a Jerusalem supermarket
- Hanadi Jaradat, 28-year-old female perpetrator of a 2003 suicide bombing inside a Haifa restaurant

== Additional sources ==
- "Wafa Idrees: A symbol of a Generation", Arabic Media Internet Network, 23 February 2002
- "Filling in the Blanks on Palestinian Bomber", The New York Times, 31 January 2002
- "The Palestinians see a `Joan of Arc'", Haaretz, 2 February 2010
- "Female Suicide Bombers: Dying for Equality?" - The Jaffee Center for Strategic Studies
