= Central Council of Muslims in Germany =

Islamic organization in Germany

- Zentralrat der Muslime in Deutschland
- Abbreviation: ZMD
- Formation: 1994
- Founder: Nadeem Elyas
- Headquarters: Cologne, Germany

The Central Council of Muslims in Germany (ZMD; German: Zentralrat der Muslime in Deutschland) is an Islamic organization in Germany. With 15,000 to 20,000 members, mainly German, German Arab, and German Turkish Muslims, it has less than half the size of the Islamrat für die Bundesrepublik Deutschland.

The Central Council was founded in 1994 by Nadeem Elyas, and since 2006 it has been led by Ayyub Axel Köhler. Its secretary-general is Aiman Mazyek. It is located in Cologne, Germany.

== Affiliated organizations also belonging to Islamisches Konzil in Deutschland ==
The following organizations belong to the Central Council of Muslims in Germany and to the Islamic Council in Germany (Islamisches Konzil in Deutschland):

- Islamische Gemeinschaft in Deutschland,
- Muslimische Studentenvereinigung,
- Union Islamisch-Albanischer Zentren in Deutschland,
- Union der Türkisch-Islamischen Kulturvereine in Europa and
- Verband islamischer Gemeinden der Bosniaken

The former leader of the Islamic Council in Germany, Abdullah al-Turki, is the leader of the Muslim World League (seat in Saudi Arabia).

== Affiliated organizations also belonging to Islamische Gemeinschaft in Deutschland ==
Islamisches Zentrum München and Islamisches Bildungswerk belong to the Islamische Gemeinschaft in Deutschland and to the Central Council of Muslims in Germany. The Islamische Gemeinschaft is affiliated to the Central Council of Muslims in Germany and to the Muslim Brotherhood.

== Affiliated organizations also belonging to Islamische Avantgarden ==
Islamische Avantgarden were founded by the former leader of the Syrian division of the Muslim brotherhood. Islamisches Zentrum Aachen and Bundesverband für Islamische Tätigkeiten belong to the Islamische Avantgarden and the Central Council of Muslims in Germany.

== The other affiliated organizations ==
- Islamische Religionsgemeinschaft Berlin belongs to the Central Council of Muslims in Germany and is dominated by the Islamische Gemeinschaft Milli Görüş.
- Islamisches Zentrum Hamburg is an affiliated organization and is dominated by the government of Iran.
- Islamische Gemeinschaft in Hamburg is close to the Islamic Centre Hamburg and an organization affiliated to the Central Council of Muslims in Germany.
- Haus des Islam is an affiliated organization, which is close to the Islamisches Zentrum Aachen of the Muslim Brotherhood. The other affiliated organizations are
  - Deutsche Muslim-Liga Bonn,
  - Deutsche Muslim-Liga Hamburg,
  - Haqqani Trust - Verein für neue deutsche Muslime, and
  - Islamische Arbeitsgemeinschaft für Sozial- und Erziehungsberufe.

== See also ==
- Council on American-Islamic Relations
- Islam in Germany
- Islamic Commission of Spain
- French Council of the Muslim Faith
- Muslim Council of Britain
- Muslim Council of Sweden
- Muslim Executive of Belgium
