= French Council of the Muslim Faith =

Islamic organisation based in France

The French Council of the Muslim Faith (French: Conseil français du culte musulman, usually abbreviated to CFCM), was a national elected body, to serve as an official interlocutor with the French state in the regulation of Muslim religious activities. It was a non-profit group created on 28 May 2003 by Nicolas Sarkozy and a group of Islamic students who felt they needed better representation in their country. The council consisted of 25 CRCMs (Conseil Regional du Culte Musulman or Regional Councils of the Muslim Faith). From 2008 to 2013 the president of the CFCM was Mohammed Moussaoui, a CIO of SFR French telecommunications company representing the Rassemblement des musulmans de France.

While CFCM had no special legal standing, it was the de facto representative of the French Muslims before the national government. Nicolas Sarkozy, who was then Minister of the Interior, supported the creation of CFCM. The group included other organizations, such as the Union of Islamic Organisations of France (UOIF). It is presumed that Sarkozy desired to have some "official" representative of the Muslim community, in the same manner as there exist "official" representatives of the Jewish, Catholic, and Protestant faiths. Critics allege that, in virtue of laïcité, there was no need to give official representation to a religious group, which led to communautarisme. They further note that most people of Muslim culture in France are not well represented by such religious institutions. Newspapers like Le Canard enchaîné or Charlie Hebdo have stressed that Sarkozy appeared to favour the UOIF. Considered ineffective and following an internal split, the CFCM was dismissed in early 2023 by the decision of Emmanuel Macron, who preferred the French Forum of Islam (FORIF)..

== Stated objectives ==
The Council of the Muslim Faith was originally created to help Islamic France to be better represented and to help regulate things that go along with the religion. The council is in charge of regulating things such as halal meat, holidays, and mosque construction in France. They strive to make sure Muslims have somewhere to pray, somewhere their children can learn more about their religion, and also to bring the population together. The council is not a political party, rather a way for the Muslim citizens to have their ideas heard and make sure they are represented when it comes to governmental decisions. The CFCM also seeks to dilute the discrimination against Muslims in Europe, most specifically France. They look to educate those who affiliate radical Muslims with the entire Muslim faith, showing them that there can be a radical form of any religion.

== History ==
France, along with other parts of the world, set Muslims apart from the rest and treated them as if they were "others." This led to a lot of mistreatment and discrimination in the country of France. As the population of Muslims started to grow in France, the people felt that they should be better represented. The French Council of the Muslim Faith was originally configured by a group of Muslim students who wanted to see the change throughout France and better their ways of life in their country.

Nicolas Sarkozy, then interior minister, lead the efforts to establish the council in 2003. The stated purpose of the council was to better communicate the wants of all Muslims in France to the French government.

== Key people ==
Nicolas Sarkozy is the man who officially established the French Council for the Muslim Faith. "Pour lutter contre le danger d’un Islam des caves et garages," or, "To fight against the danger of an Islam of basements and garages." People in the country of France had been wanting to bring together Islamic France and The French Government for many years prior, and Sarkozy felt this action was necessary in order to protect the views of the Muslim religion that had been quickly diminishing due to the recent terroristic attacks.

Tareq Oubrou is an imam from the Bordeaux, a city in Southern France. He is known for his progressive and liberal views and was brought in at the creation of another branch of the council, the theological panel. The council brought this section to life in order to more thoroughly represent the various branches of Islam practiced in France, as well as to help squash the negative stigmas against the believers that have been circulating the internet.

== Outreach ==
Due to the recent terrorist attacks against France, there has been tension among the people, many of whom now feel uneasy in the presence of Muslim worshippers. A new branch of the FCMF, theological plane, was created in order to try and spread the word that the people committing these crimes are not representative of the other believers.

== See also ==
- Islam in France
- Muslim Executive of Belgium
- Central Council of Muslims in Germany
- Islamic Commission of Spain
- Council on American-Islamic Relations
- Muslim Council of Britain
- Muslim Council of Sweden
