= Znamenskoye, Chechen Republic =

Selo in Chechnya

Coordinates: 43°40′34″N 45°7′39″E

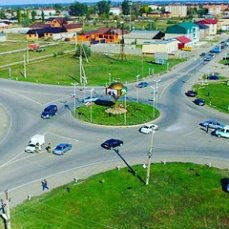
Znamenskoye, Chechen Republic

Znamenskoye (Russian: Зна́менское; Chechen: Чӏуьлга-Йурт, Ç̇ülga-Yurt) is a rural locality (a selo) in Nadterechny District of the Chechen Republic, Russia. Population: 10,286 (2010 census); 9,620 (2002 census); 6,141 (1989 Soviet census).

On May 12, 2003, a car bomb exploded at a government building here, killing fifty-nine people. On July 15, 2005, another car bomb killed fifteen.

== Gallery ==
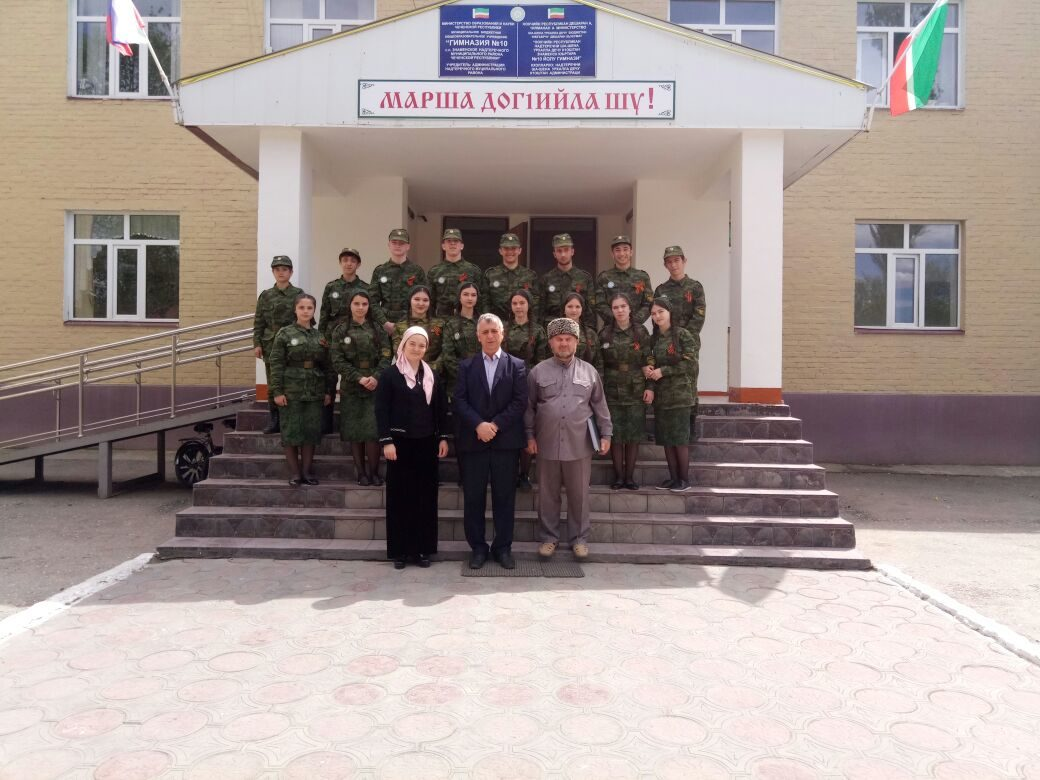
Grammar school №10 Znamenskoye

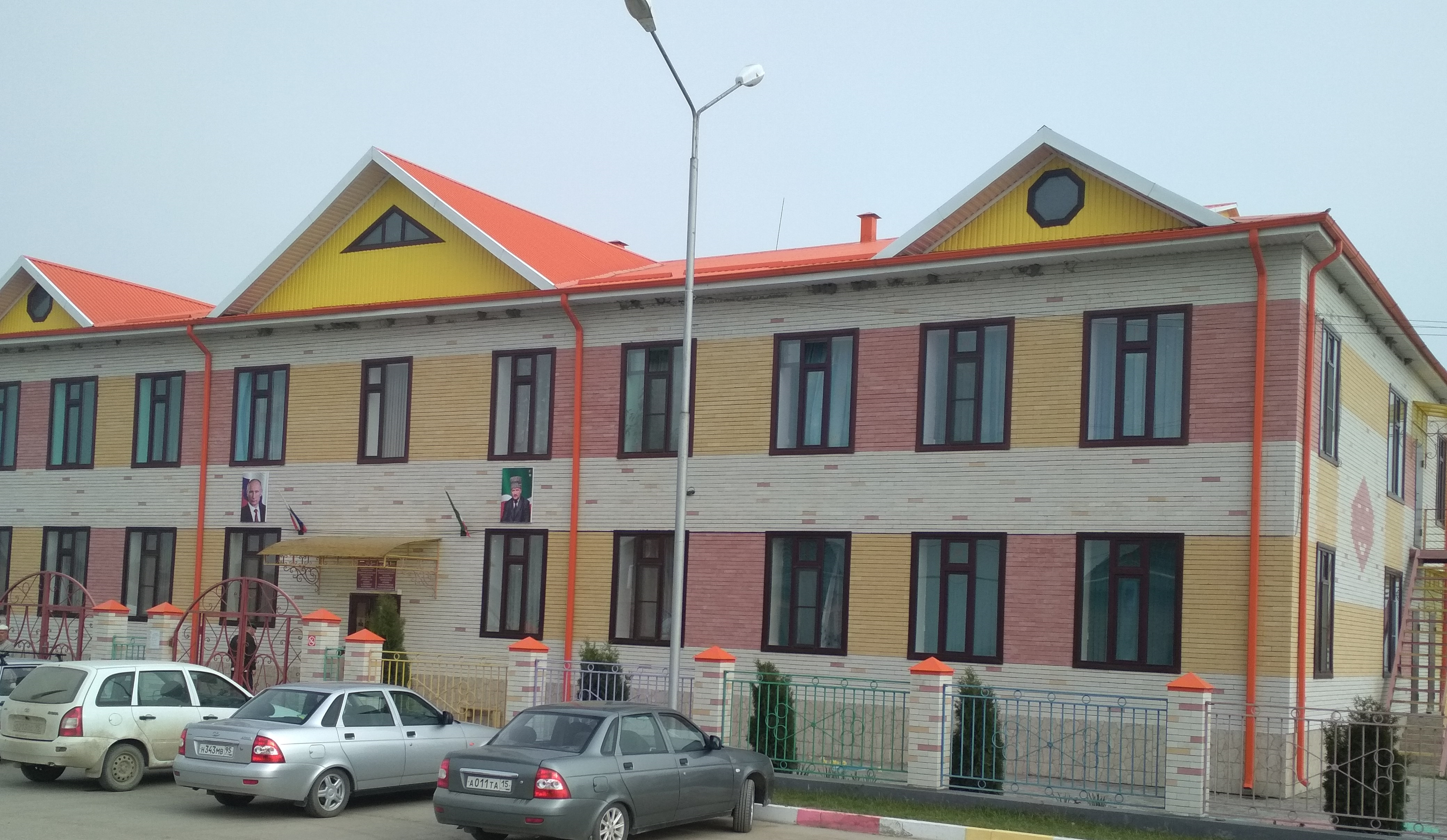
Kindergarten "Teremok" in Znamenskoye

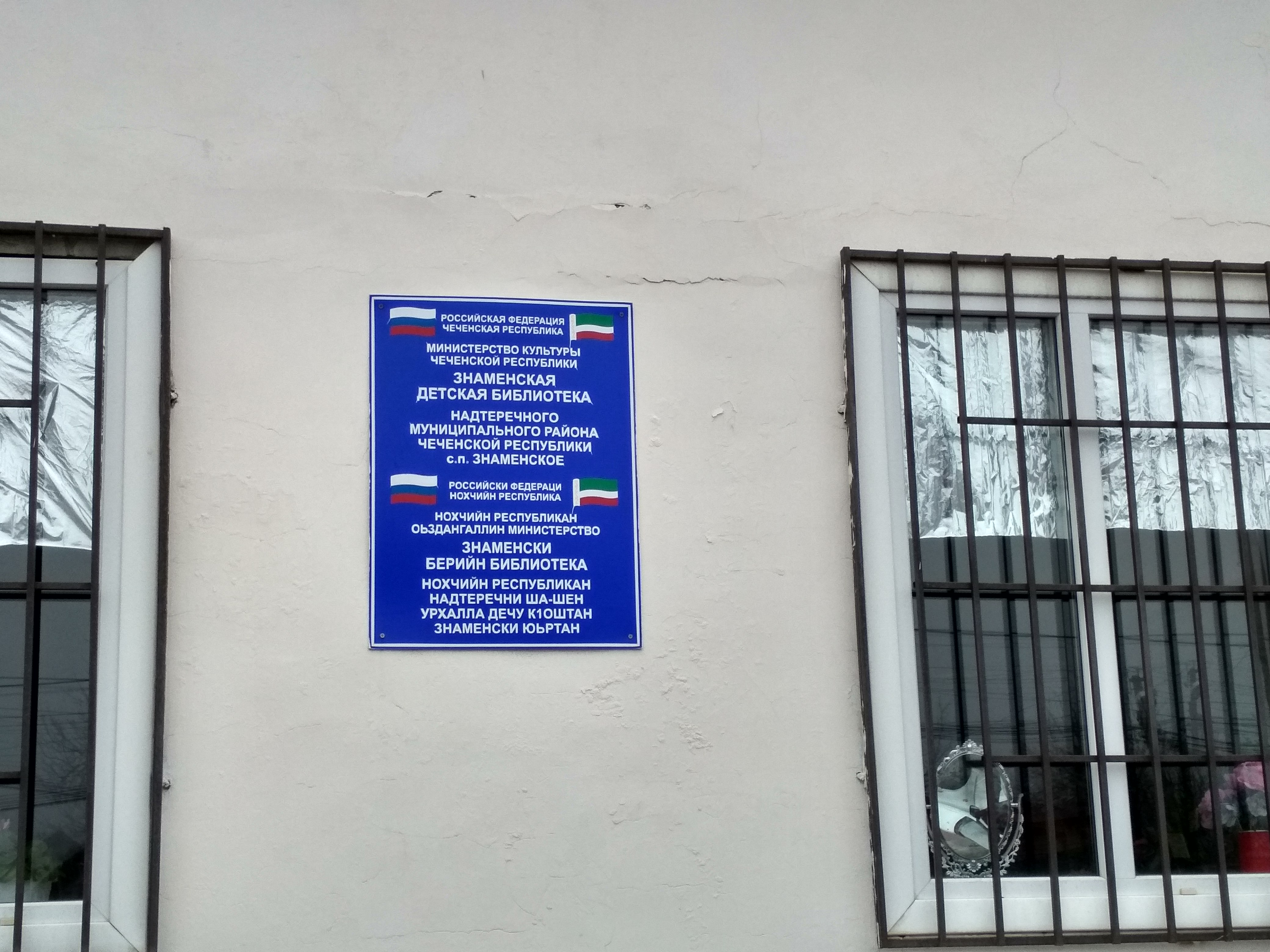
Children's library

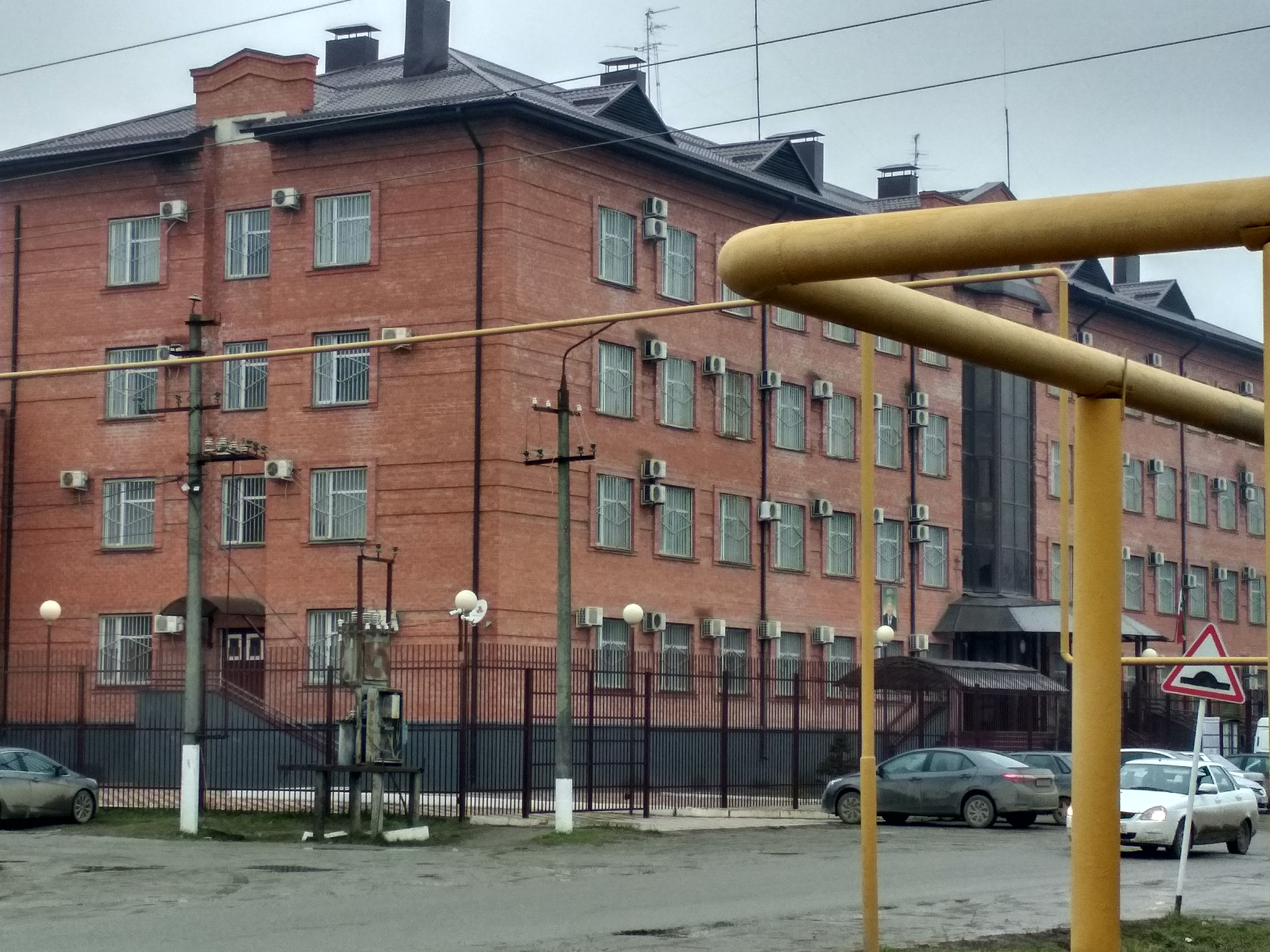
Police building Nadterechny district

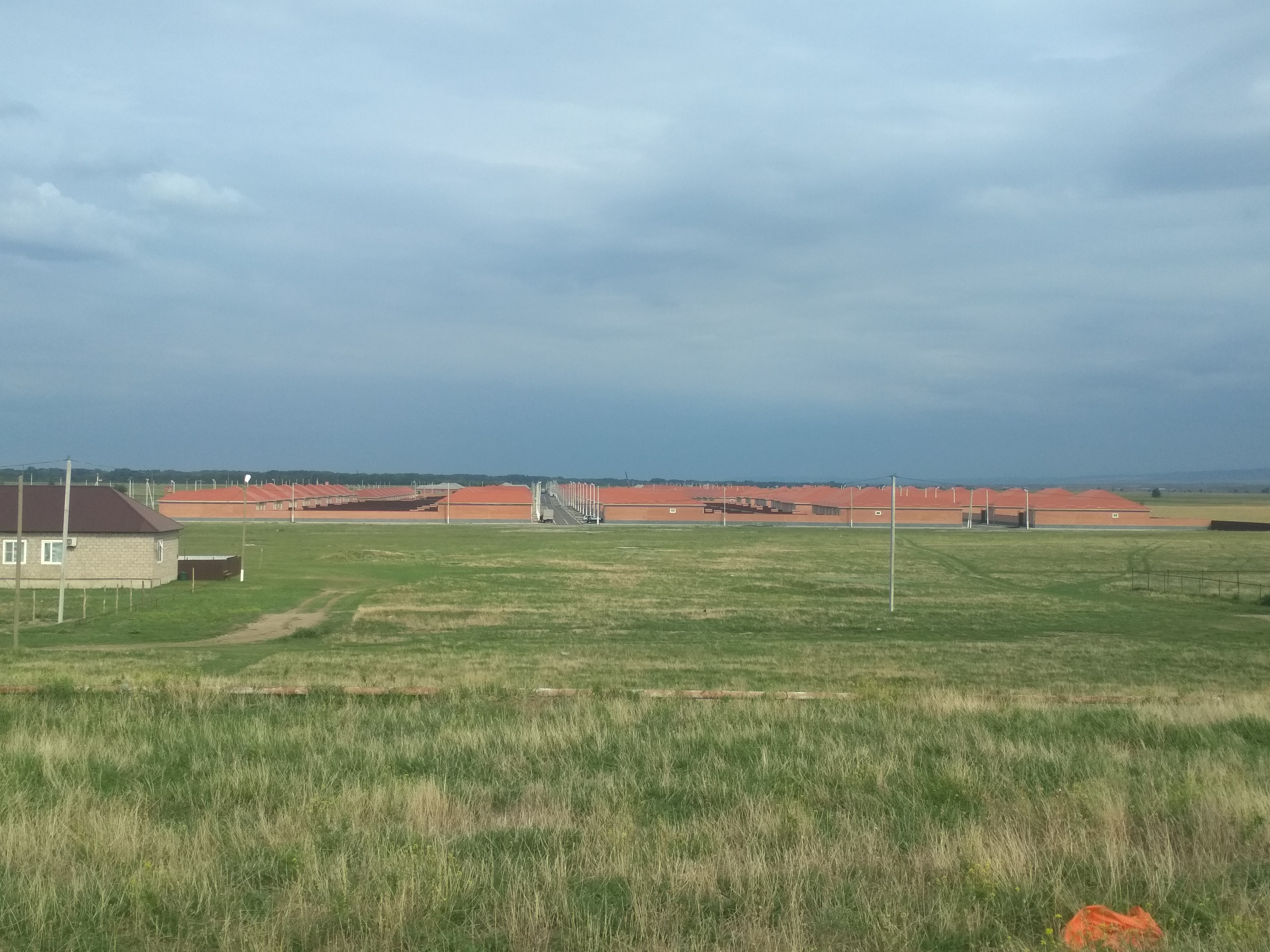
Kadyrov microdistrict in Znamenskoye

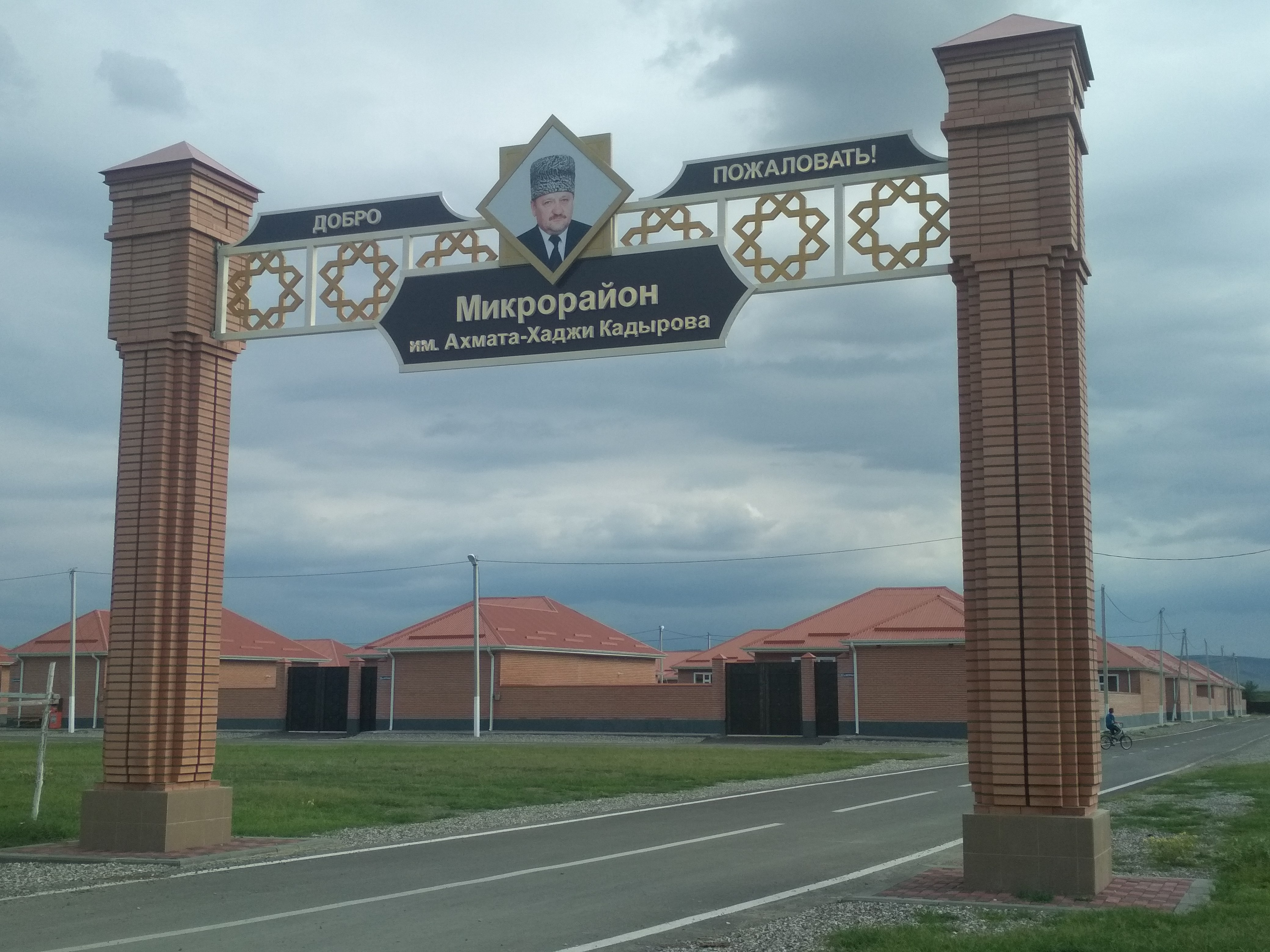
Entrance arch in Znamensky microdistrict
