= Gaidar Gadzhiyev =

Deceased Russian Major General

Gaidar Malikovich Gadzhiyev (Russian: Гейдар Маликович Гаджиев; 5 August 1953 – 1 December 2001) was a Russian major general of the Strategic Missile Troops.

Gadzhiyev, had been a deputy military commandant for Russia since 1998, and was in charge of the Urus-Martanovsky District in Chechnya when he was killed in suicide attack by a young local woman, Aiza Gazuyeva. On 29 November 2001, in what is believed to be revenge for her witnessing him personally killing her husband, Aiza Gazuyeva entered Gadzhiyev's office and detonated a bundle of hand grenades. The blast killed Gazuyeva and two of Gadzhiyev's bodyguards instantly, while Gadzhiyev himself initially survived with serious injuries until he died a few days later on 1 December. Despite the attack being personally motivated and not political, the attack was one of the first notable shahidka (Chechen female suicide bomber) attacks to occur in Russia.

Gadzhiyev was awarded the Order of Courage in 2001, and posthumously the title of Hero of the Russian Federation "for courage and heroism in the counter-terrorist operation in the North Caucasus" in 2002.

== Memory ==
In 2014, marking the 60th anniversary of Gadzhiev’s birth, a memorial plaque was installed on the house in the settlement of Lokomotivny, Chelyabinsk Oblast, where he lived during his service in the 59th Missile Division.

In addition, a local House of Culture and the cadet corps of Secondary School No. 2 bear Gadzhiev’s name; their pupils are known as “young Gadzhievites.” Each year on August 5, the cadets hold a memorial assembly in honor of Heydar Gadzhiev. The school building contains a memorial corner and commemorative display dedicated to him, and since 2019, also a bust.

On March 15, 2016, “for special merits and outstanding achievements before the Fatherland,” one of the central streets of Makhachkala was named after Gadzhiev. A memorial plaque has also been installed there.

A school in the village of Kharakhi, Khunzakhsky District of Dagestan—where Gadzhiev studied—bears his name, as does one of the streets in the district center of that municipality.

== See also ==
- List of Heroes of the Russian Federation
