= Nadterechny District =

Nadterechny District Надтеречный район (Russian)
- District

Other transcription(s)
  - Chechen: Теркан кӀошт
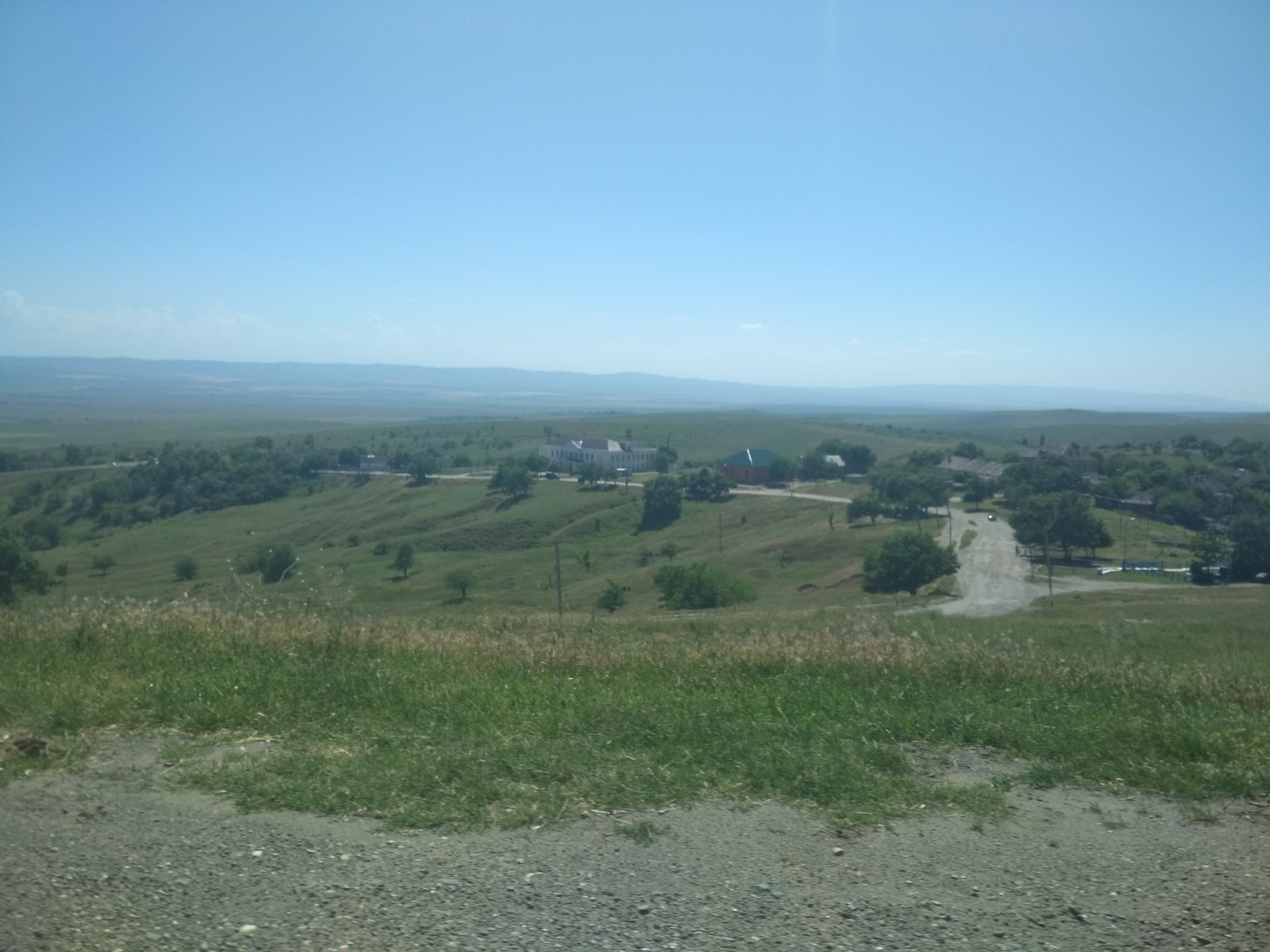
- Landscape in Nadterechny District

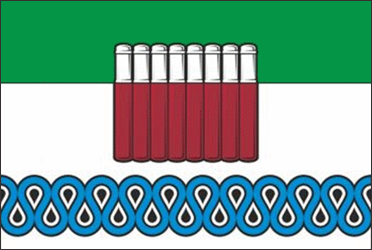
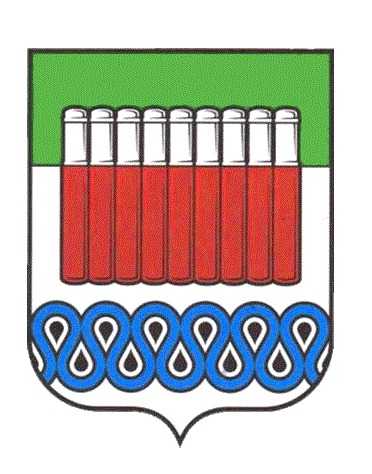
- Flag Coat of arms
- Location of Nadterechny District in the Chechen Republic
- Coordinates: 43°40′44″N 45°07′25″E
- Country: Russia
- Federal subject: Chechen Republic
- Established: 1926
- Administrative center: Znamenskoye

Area
  - Total: 938 km^{2} (362 sq mi)

Population (2010 Census)
  - Total: 55,782
  - Density: 59.5/km^{2} (154/sq mi)
  - Urban: 0%
  - Rural: 100%

Administrative structure
  - Administrative divisions: 1 Urban-type settlements, 11 Rural administrations
  - Inhabited localities: 1 urban-type settlements, 12 rural localities

Municipal structure
  - Municipally incorporated as: Nadterechny Municipal District
  - Municipal divisions: 0 urban settlements, 12 rural settlements
- Time zone: UTC+3 (MSK)
- OKTMO ID: 96616000
- Website: http://xn--80aidautewq7c4b.xn--p1ai/

Nadterechny District (Russian: Надте́речный райо́н; Chechen: Теркан кӀошт, Terkan khoşt) is an administrative and municipal district (raion), one of the fifteen in the Chechen Republic, Russia. It is located in the northwest of the republic. The area of the district is 938 square kilometers (362 sq mi). Its administrative center is the rural locality (a selo) of Znamenskoye. Population: 55,782 (2010 census); 51,755 (2002 Census); 35,742 (1989 Soviet census). The population of Znamenskoye accounts for 18.4% of the district's total population.

== Geography ==
Nadterechny District is located in the northwest of Chechnya. The Terek River runs west-to-east along the northern border of Nadterkechny on its way to the Caspian Sea 160 km to the east. The district is 25 km northwest of the city of Grozny, and about 1,400 km south of Moscow. The area measures 45 km (north-south), and 20 km (west-east). Its administrative center is the rural locality (a selo) of Znamenskoye. Located on mountain plain between the Terek River and the Terek Ridge, the area is characterized by steppe vegetation, and forest along the river floodplain. Because the river is fed by snowmelt in the Caucasus mountains, spring flooding can be significant.

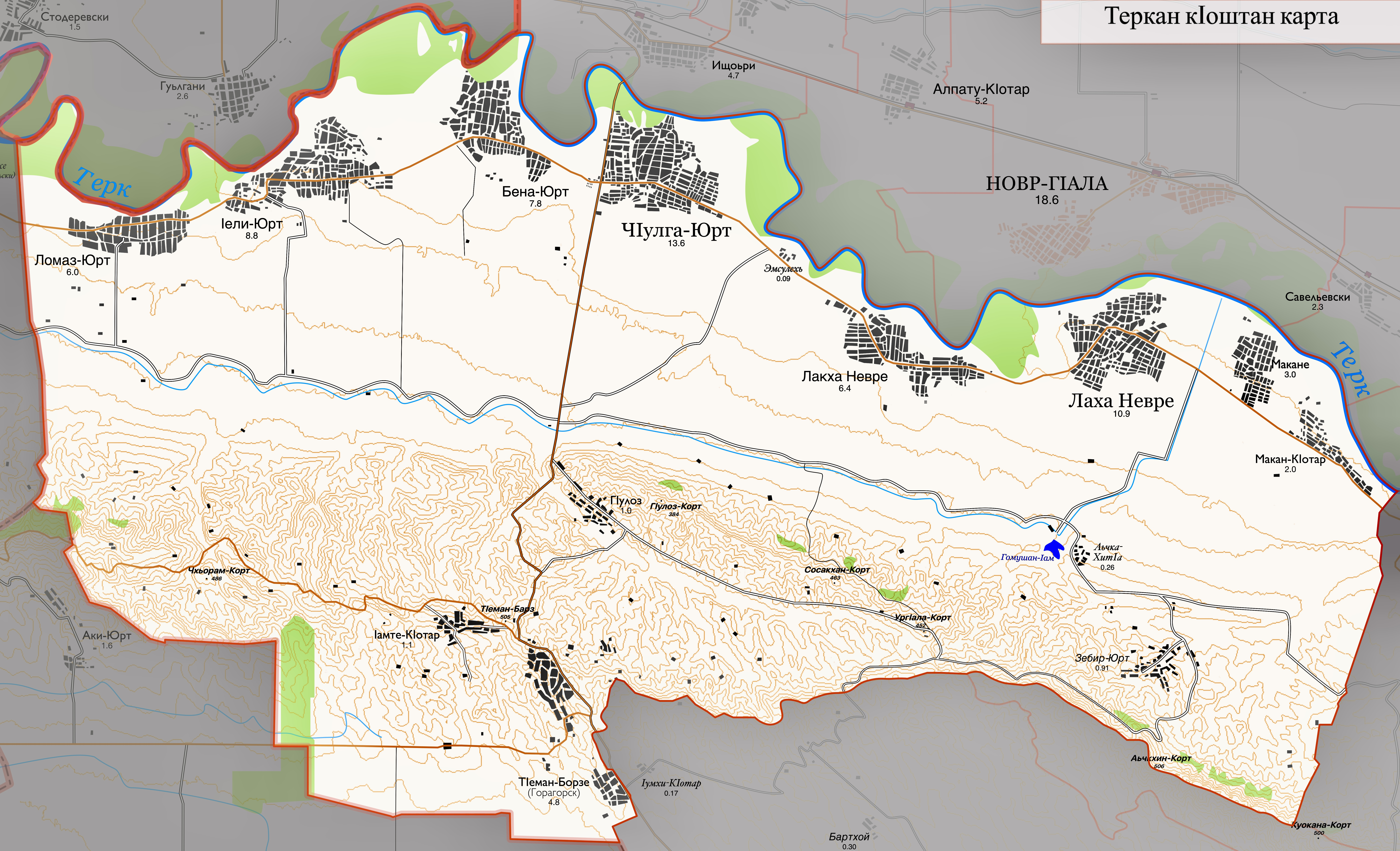
Map of the Nadterechny District (in Chechen)

The district is bordered on the northwest by Stavropol Krai, on the west by North Ossetia-Alania, on the southwest by Ingushetia, on the north by Naursky District, and on the southeast by Groznensky District.
