= Aiza Gazuyeva =

Chechen suicide bomber and heroic figure (1984–2001)

Aiza Gazuyeva (14 March 1984 – 29 November 2001) was a Chechen woman, known for detonating an explosive device that killed General Gaidar Gadzhiyev, a major general of the Russian Army, on November 29, 2001. Despite being personally motivated and not political, it was one of the first notable shahidka attacks to occur in Russia, and Gazuyeva became a semi-legendary figure among in Chechen society.

== Background ==
Aiza Gazuyeva (also transliterated as Gazueva and variably known as Aizan, Elza, Luisa or Luiza) is believed to have been born around 1983, and between 18 or 20 years-old at the time of her death. Reportedly, Gazuyeva had lost 16 relatives in the Second Chechen War, including her husband (to whom she was married only two months earlier), two brothers, and a cousin. Her disabled brother, who had lost both legs to a land mine in the First Chechen War, was shot dead without reason by Russian troops near their family home. The commander of the Russian forces in the area, General Gaidar Gadzhiyev, was very unpopular among locals and was commonly accused of committing atrocities against civilians. Allegedly Gadzhiyev had summoned Gazuyeva, where he brutally killed her arrested husband with a knife and then pulling her head into the gaping stomach wound. According to another version, the general told Gazuyeva that he killed her husband with his own hands during an interrogation.

== Attack ==
On 29 November 2001, Gazuyeva approached a group of Russian soldiers including General Gadzhiyev in front of the military commandant's office (Russian: komendatura). Reportedly, her last words were: "Do you recognize me?" or "Do you still remember me?" to which Gadzhiyev replied: "I have no time to talk to you!" After the general's answer, Gazuyeva detonated a bundle of hand grenades hidden under her clothes. Gazuyeva and two of Gadzhiyev's bodyguards died instantly, and two other soldiers were injured. Gadzhiyev, who was wearing a flak jacket, was critically wounded (reportedly losing both of his eyes and one arm) and died of his injuries days later on December 1.

== Aftermath ==
A wave of severe reprisals by Russian forces were launched against Gazuyeva's family and the local population. Soldiers blew up the home of Gazuyeva and her parents, as well as the houses belonging to at least four other families, while several men from Gazuyev's family were detained and beaten. Soon after the attack, 72 people were detained in the city of Urus-Martan and some of them were reported to having been disappeared. One day after Gadzhiyev's death, several people were detained in the village of Alkhan-Yurt in Urus-Martanovsky District, and some of them were later found murdered. On December 13, disfigured bodies of several men killed by explosive devices were discovered in Chechnya and later identified as residents of three villages in the Urus-Martan region who had disappeared early in December, including four who were among those detained in Alkhan-Yurt: Lom-Ali Yunusov, Musa Yunusov, Shamil Dzhemaldayev, and Aslan Taramov.
