= Muriel Degauque =

Belgian Islamist (1967–2005)

Muriel Degauque (French pronunciation: [myʁjɛl dəɡok]; 19 July 1967 – 9 November 2005) was a Belgian woman from Charleroi and a convert to Islam. La Derniere Heure, a Belgian newspaper, claimed on 1 December 2005 that she was a suicide bomber in Iraq. According to Belgian authorities, a Belgian woman committed a suicide car bomb attack on 9 November 2005 against a U.S. military convoy in the town of Baquba, north of Baghdad. The Belgian was the only person killed, and an American soldier was wounded.

Belgian authorities subsequently interrogated her family and concluded that Degauque was the bomber. A bakery worker, she married a Muslim man and quickly became radical in her religious views. The couple moved into Iraq from the Syrian border, presumably to join the Iraqi insurgency. Degauque's husband failed to detonate his explosive belt and was killed in a separate incident by US troops.

== Biography ==
=== Early life ===
Degauque was born in Monceau-sur-Sambre, a suburb on the outskirts of Charleroi, to Jean Degauque, a crane operator and Liliane Degauue, a school monitor. She was raised Roman Catholic.

Teachers recall that she was "more literary than scientific". During her last years of high school, she worked at a local bakery. She became known to locals and to police as a drug user and frequently ran away from home, although she was never arrested. Degauque would go on to join the Apaches, a local motorcycle club her older brother was also a member of. Many attribute her deviant behaviour to her brother's death in a motorcycle crash when she was 20. Degauque subsequently moved out of the house and married an older Turkish national in what was presumed to be a marriage of convenience to help him obtain legal residence in Belgium. The couple would divorce about two years later, and she was noted to have had several boyfriends after.

=== Conversion to Islam and radicalization ===
After meeting an Algerian man, she converted to Islam and began donning a head scarf. Her family did not disapprove of the conversion initially and her mother told neighbors she was pleased because her daughter's new faith helped her quit drinking and taking drugs. Her religiosity raised concerns several years later when Degauque met Issam Goris, the son of a Belgian man and Moroccan woman and a known radical Islamist. She adopted the name Myriam, and the couple married and moved to Brussels, then Morocco, where she would learn Arabic and study the Quran.

Upon returning from Morocco, Degauque started wearing a chador and the niqab. She and Goris moved into a small apartment not far away from his mother in an ethnic neighbourhood near Brussels' Midi train station. The building's owner recalled that Degauque collected unemployment benefits. It is unknown what Goris's occupation was. Her relations with her parents became increasingly strained as she demanded they follow Islamic customs when she visited, forbidding her father to drink and insisting on the separation of the sexes during meals.

Belgian police later revealed that Goris was involved with an Islamist group recruiting European Muslims to fight in Iraq. They had been monitoring the cell for some time when they discovered that Goris and Degauque were in Iraq, after intercepting phone calls from Goris. Their identities were unknown at the time, but Belgian authorities notified the American and Iraqi governments of the threat posed by a Belgian couple in Iraq and provided them with intel.

Degauque called her mother from Syria in August, telling her she would be gone for over a year. It was the last they heard of their daughter until the attack.

== Suicide attack ==
On 9 November 2005 Degauque detonated an explosive located in her vehicle in an attack on an American Ground assault team heading south on MSR Tampa led by Command Sergeant Major David Wood of the 3rd Coscom out of Wiesbaden Germany. She was heading north along the route and then popped left across the median toward the middle of the American convoy. Upon entering the southbound lanes of MSR Tampa she struck the American vehicle numbered TFB-11. During the attack she killed only herself and injured an American soldier, a man who prefers not to be named. Degauque immediately died from her injuries, as she blew up her car.

A passport and other documentation were recovered by American soldiers. Travel documents indicated that Goris and Degauque had crossed Turkey overland by car to Iraq. She had recently married a Moroccan man and converted to Islam. Her husband and remaining insurgents were killed by US military later on in the early morning hours of 10 November, 2005.

Earlier that day, Goris, also wearing an explosives vest, was shot and killed by American soldiers as he tried to carry out an attack in another location.

Degauque is considered to be Europe's first female suicide bomber. Her story led to an increased interest in the radicalization of European women and the recruitment of convert suicide bombers.

== Aftermath ==
Belgian and French police continued surveillance operations until French press reported that Degauque was the attacker. Her identity had been unknown at the time. Fearing members of the cell would cease operations and go under the radar, Belgian and French authorities promptly arrested 15 people in a number of cities for allegedly grooming and recruiting suicide bombers. Most of the suspects were released shortly after.
