= List of Russian assassinations =

This is a list of people suspected or confirmed to have been assassinated by the government of the Russian Federation. Some of the assassinations or targeted killings took place overseas.

== 1990s ==
Date	Place	Country	Target	Description	Action	Killer
April 21, 1996	Gekhi-Czu	Chechen Republic of Ichkeria (Note: De-facto. Internationally recognized as Chechen Republic within Russia.)	Dzhokhar Dudayev	First president of the Chechen Republic of Ichkeria	Killed by two laser-guided missile strikes on his car	Russian Air Force
July 3, 1998	Klokovo, Moscow Oblast	Russia	Lev Rokhlin	Russian politician, formerly a military figure during the First Chechen War, founder of the anti-government Movement in Support of the Army	Shot dead in his sleep	FSB (claimed by Alexander Litvinenko; disputed)

== 2000s ==
Date	Place	Country	Target	Description	Action	Killer
May 17, 2000	Shali, Chechnya	Russia	Ruslan Alikhadzhiyev	Fourth chairman of the Ichkerian Parliament	Abducted and executed	FSB (per European Court of Human Rights; denied by Russia)
June 22, 2001	Alkhan-Kala, Chechnya	Russia	Arbi Barayev	Founder of the Special Purpose Islamic Regiment	Killed in a targeted mopping operation (per the official Russian report) Captured in the operation, later tortured and executed (per Kavkaz Center)	FSB; VV MVD (per the official Russian report) GRU (per Kavkaz Center)
March 20, 2002	Chechnya	Russia	Ibn al-Khattab	Prominent Saudi militant and founder of the Emir of the Mujahideen in Chechnya	Killed via letter poisoned by a nerve agent	FSB
June 27, 2002	Mesker-Yurt, Chechnya	Russia	Rizvan Akhmadov	Commander of the Central Front of the Ichkerian during the Second Chechen War	Ambushed while leaving his house	Chechen militsiya; VV MVD
August 26, 2002	Shali, Chechnya	Russia	Aslambek Abdulkhadzhiev	Shamil Basayev's deputy and one of the coordinators of Budyonnovsk hospital hostage crisis	Killed by his own grenade in a raid that targeted an alleged meeting of high-profile Ichkerian commanders	Chechen militsiya; VV MVD
c. September 14, 2002	Chechen–Aul, Chechnya	Russia	Zelimkhan Akhmadov	Commander of the Grozny and Urus-Martan fronts of Ichkerian forces during the Second Chechen War	Killed by a car bomb	Chechen OMON
April 17, 2003	Moscow	Russia	Sergei Yushenkov	Russian politician and investigator. Head of the Liberal Russia party	Shot dead near his house	FSB (per Litvinenko; denied by the Russian Supreme Court)
July 3, 2003	Moscow	Russia	Yuri Shchekochikhin	Soviet and Russian politician, writer and investigative journalist	Illness, allegedly poisoned by radioactive materials	FSB (per Novaya Gazeta and others (Note: Oleg Kalugin, Edward Lucas); denied by the Russian Investigative Committee)
February 14, 2004	Doha	Qatar	Zelimkhan Yandarbiyev	Second President, prime minister and vice president of Ichkeria	Fatally wounded by a car bomb	GRU (per Qatar; denied by Russia)
September 24, 2004	Saint Petersburg	Russia	Roman Tsepov	Russian oligarch and former bodyguard of Vladimir Putin	Illness, allegedly poisoned by radioactive materials	Unknown (Note: Syptoms similar to that of Alexander Litvienko and Yuri Shchekochikhin)
February 16, 2005	Kantyshevo, Ingushetia	Russia	Abu Omar al-Kuwaiti	Kuwaiti al-Qaeda representative to Ingushetia. Took part in organization of the Mozdok truck bombing, 2004 Nazran raid and Beslan terror attack	Blown by grenade or explosive belt in a targeted raid on his bunker	FSB
March 8, 2005	Tolstoy-Yurt, Chechnya	Russia	Aslan Maskhadov	Third president and prime minister of Ichkeria, first chief of staff of Ichkerian forces	Shot dead in a raid on his hideout	FSB
March 23, 2005	Shali, Chechnya	Russia	Rizvan Chitigov	Commander of the Shali front of Ichkerian forces during the Second Chechen War and former US marine. Took part in the Budyonnovsk hospital hostage crisis and Russian apartment bombings	Killed in a targeted raid	VV MVD
July 10, 2006	Ekazhevo, Ingushetia	Russia	Shamil Basayev	Generalissimo and sixth prime minister of Ichkeria. Mastermind of numerous terror attacks inside Russia during both Chechen wars (Note: Including Budyonnovsk, Beslan, Moscow theater terror attacks and 2004 Russian aircraft bombings.)	Killed during an arms deal by a truck bomb that was remotely detonated by Russian agents	FSB
October 7, 2006	Moscow	Russia	Anna Politkovskaya	Russian investigative journalist, writer and human rights activist known for her reports regarding the Second Chechen War	Shot dead in the elevator of her apartment block	FSB (alleged; denied by Russia)
November 18, 2006	Moscow	Russia	Movladi Baisarov	Chechen FSB colonel and "Gorets" detachment chief	Gunned down while exiting his car	Chechen VV MVD
November 23, 2006	London	United Kingdom	Alexander Litvinenko	FSB defector and writer	Died of illness after being poisoned with polonium-210	FSB (alleged; denied by Russia)
November 26, 2006	Serzhen'-Yurt, Chechnya	Russia	Abu Hafs al-Urduni	Third emir of the Chechen Mujahideen	Killed in a targeted raid on a private residence	FSB
September 17, 2007	Buynaksk, Dagestan	Russia	Rappani Khalilov; Nabi Nabiyev	Khalilov was the second emir of Shariat Jamaat; Nabiyev was his deputy	Killed in a targeted raid on a private residence	VV MVD; FSB
August 31, 2008	Nazran, Ingushetia	Russia	Magomed Yevloyev	Ingush journalist, human rights activist and businessman	Accidentally shot dead (per MVD) Political killing (per Russian opposition)	Militsiya
September 6, 2008	Istanbul	Turkey	Gaji Edilsultanov	Former Ichkerian field commander with a rank of colonel	Shot dead	FSB (per Turkey)
September 24, 2008	Moscow	Russia	Ruslan Yamadayev	Former Ichkerian warlord and later a colonel within Russian Armed Forces. Hero of the Russian Federation	Shot ten times while sitting in a car owned by his brother Sulim	Kadyrovites (per Sulim Yamadayev; denied by Ramzan Kadyrov)
December 9, 2008	Istanbul	Turkey	Islam Janibekov	Former Ichkerian field commander	Shot three times in front of his wife and children	FSB (per Turkey)
January 13, 2009	Vienna	Austria	Umar Israilov	Former bodyguard of Ramzan Kadyrov and later a vocal critic of his government	Shot dead near a supermarket	Kadyrovites (alleged by Austria)
February 26, 2009	Istanbul	Turkey	Musa Atayev (Ali Osayev)	Istanbul representative of the Caucasus Emirate	Shot in the head three times near his house	FSB (per Turkey)
March 28, 2009	Dubai	United Arab Emirates	Sulim Yamadayev	Former Ichkerian warlord, later Vostok Battalion founder and commander. Hero of the Russian Federation	Shot in the back of the neck in an underground garage	Kadyrovites (per UAE; denied by Adam Delimkhanov)

== 2010s ==
Date	Place	Country	Target	Description	Action	Killer
March 2, 2010	Ekazhevo, Ingushetia	Russia	Said Buryatsky	Leader of the Riyad-us Saliheen under the Caucasus Emirate. Organized several terrorist attacks in Russia	Killed in a targeted raid on his residence	VV MVD; FSB
June 8, 2010	Vedeno, Checnya	Russia	Yassir al-Sudani	Senior African militant allegedly involved in numerous attacks on Russian and local forces	Killed in a targeted raid in Vedeno forest	VV MVD; FSB
August 21, 2010	Gunib, Dagestan	Russia	Magomed Vagabov; Rustam Munkiev	Vagabov was the eighth emir of the Vilayat Dagestan, mastermind of the 2010 Moscow Metro bombings; Munkiev was the emir of Khasavyurtovsky District of Dagestan	Killed in a targeted raid on his apartment	FSB
March 28, 2011	Ingushetia	Russia	Supyan Abdullayev	Seventh and last vice president of Ichkeria, close ally of Dokka Umarov	Killed in an airstrike on his camp	Russian Air Force
April 11, 2011	Serzhen'-Yurt, Chechnya	Russia	Muhannad	Jordanian militant and the fourth emir of the Arab mujahideen	Killed in a targeted raid in Serzhen'-Yurt forest	VV MVD
September 16, 2011	Istanbul	Turkey	Berg-Hadj Musayev; Zaurbek Amriyev; Rustam Altemirov	Chechen separatist militants accused of committing the Domodedovo International Airport bombing.	Shot dead	FSB (per Turkey)
November 11, 2012	London	United Kingdom	Alexander Perepilichny	Russian businessman and whistleblower	Died while jogging after allegedly being poisoned	GRU (allegedly; denied by Russia)
September 7, 2013	Sunzhensky District, Ingushetia	Russia	Dokka Umarov	Last president of Ichkeria and Caucasus Emirate founder	Died after being poisoned	FSB
December 10, 2014	Istanbul	Turkey	Abdullah Bukhari	Uzbek religious figure and dissident	Died of wounds after being shot in the back	FSB (per Turkey)
May 24, 2014	Sagopshi, Ingushetia	Russia	Arthur Getagazhev	Eight emir of Vilayat Galgayche	Killed in a raid on a private residence	FSB
January 1, 2015	Lutuhyne	Luhansk People's Republic (Note: De-facto. Internationally recognized as Luhansk Oblast within Ukraine.)	Alexander Bednov	Founder and commander of the Rapid Response Group "Batman". Second LPR Defence Minister	Shot dead in an attack on his military convoy	Wagner Group under Russian government orders (allegedly )
January 23, 2015	Pervomaisk	Luhansk People's Republic	Yevgeny Ishchenko	LPR installed commandant of Pervomaisk	Shot dead in an attack on his car	Wagner Group under Russian government orders (allegedly)
April 19, 2015	Gerei-Avlak, Dagestan	Russia	Aliaskhab Kebekov; Shamil Gadzhiev	Kebekov was the second emir of the Caucasus Emirate; Gadzhiev was the emir of the Untsukulsky District of Dagestan	Killed in a raid on a private residence	VV MVD; FSB
May 23, 2015	near Mykhailivka, Alchevsk Raion	Luhansk People's Republic	Aleksey Mozgovoy; Anna Samelyuk	Mozgovoy was the founder and commander of the Prizrak Brigade; Samelyuk was his press secretary	Shot dead in the attack on Mozgovoy's car	Wagner Group under Russian government orders (allegedly) or GRU (per Igor Girkin) SBU (per Ukrainska Pravda)
August 11, 2015	Gimry, Dagestan	Russia	Magomed Suleimanov; Kamil Sayidov	Suleimanov was the third emir of the Caucasus Emirate; Sayidov was his deputy and fourteenth emir of Vilayat Dagestan	Killed in a raid near Gimry	FSB
November 1, 2015	Istanbul	Turkey	Abdulvahid Edelgiriev	Istanbul representative of Vilayat Nokhchicho. Former fighter of the Caucasus Emirate, Liwa al-Muhajireen wal-Ansar and Chechen volunteers in Ukraine	Shot, then stabbed to death	FSB (per Turkey)
December 12, 2015	Pervomaisk	Luhansk People's Republic	Pavel Dremov	Founder and commander of the 6th Separate Cossack Motor Rifle Brigade. Commandant of Kadiivka and Sievierodonetsk	Killed by a car bomb	Wagner Group under Russian government orders (allegedly)
May 11, 2016	Kocaeli Province	Turkey	Ruslan Israpilov	Former Ichkerian militant, ally of Shamil Basayev and brother of Khunkar-Pasha Israpilov	Shot in the head, neck and heart	FSB (per Turkey)
December 3, 2016	near Makhachkala, Dagestan	Russia	Rustam Asildarov	First and only wali of the Islamic State's Caucasus Province and thirteenth emir of Vilayat Dagestan	Killed in a raid on a private residence	VV MVD; FSB
March 31, 2017	Mariupol, Donetsk Oblast	Ukraine	Oleksandr Kharaberiush	Ukrainian colonel. Deputy chief of the Main Counterintelligence Derictorate of the Security Service of Ukraine branch in Donetsk Oblast	Killed by a car bomb	Ministry of State Security of DPR under Russian orders
June 27, 2017	Kostiantynivka, Donetsk Oblast	Ukraine	Yuri Vozny; Dmitro Piddyachny; Andriy Mykhaylenko	Col. Vozny was a department chief in the SBU Main Counterintelligence Derictorate; Sr. Lt. Piddyachny and Lt. Mykhaylenko were SBU operatives	Killed by a car bomb	FSB (per Ukraine)
June 27, 2017	Kyiv	Ukraine	Maksym Shapoval	Commander of the 10th Special Purpose Detachment of the Main Directorate of Intelligence of Ukraine	Killed by a car bomb	FSB (per Ukraine)
September 8, 2017	Kyiv	Ukraine	Ali Timaiev	Veteran of both Chechen, Russo-Georgian and Donbass wars. Aleeged assassin of Shamil Basayev	Killed by a car bomb	FSB or Kadyrovites (allegedly)
October 25, 2017	Kyiv	Ukraine	Mykhailo Mormil; Ruslan Kushnir	Mormil was a retired police lieutenant colonel. Kushnir was a police senior sergeant and a bodyguard of Ihor Mosiychuk	Killed by a motorcycle bomb that was supposedly made to assassinate Mosiychuk.	Kadyrovites (allegedly)
October 30, 2017	Hlevakha, Kyiv Oblast	Ukraine	Amina Okueva	Ukrainian police officer and wife of Adam Osmayev	Shot dead in the attack on her and her husband's car	Kadyrovites (per Ukraine)
August 23, 2019	Berlin	Germany	Zelimkhan Khangoshvili	Former Ichkerian field commander and Georgian military officer. Veteran of the Second Chechen war and Russo-Georgian war	Shot twice in the head by an undercover FSB officer	FSB

== 2020s ==
Date	Place	Country	Target	Description	Action	Killer
January 30, 2020	Lille	France	Imran Aliyev	Chechen blogger and dissident. Vocal critic of Ramzan Kadyrov	Stabbed to death	Kadyrovites (allegedly)
July 4, 2020	Vienna	Austria	Mamikhan Umarov	Chechen blogger and dissident. Vocal critic of Ramzan Kadyrov	Shot in the head	Kadyrovites (allegedly; denied by Kadyrov)
August 23, 2023	Kuzhenkino, Tver Oblast	Russia	Yevgeny Prigozhin; Dmitry Utkin; Valery Chekalov; Sergey Prospustin; Evgeny Makaryan; Alexander Totmin; Nikolai Matuseev	Prigozhin was a Russian oligarch and co-founder of Wagner Group; Utkin was a retired spetsnaz officer and co-founder of Wagner Group; Chekalov was Wagner Group's head of logistics; Prospustin, Makaryan, Totmin, Matuseev were Prigozhin's associates and Wagner Group veterans	Plane crash	Unknown (allegedly orchestraited by Nikolai Patrushev)
February 13, 2024	Villajoyosa	Spain	Maxim Kuzminov	Russian Air Force defector. Main target of the Operation Synytsia	Shot six times then ran over by a car	SVR (allegedly)
March 15, 2024	Odessa	Ukraine	Oleksandr Hostishchev; Sergiy Tetyukhin	Hostishchev was Tsunami Regiment commander; Sergiy Tetyukhin was former First Deputy Mayor of Odesa	Killed in a targeted aistrike during a broader attack on the city	Russian Armed Forces
December 14, 2024	Dnipro	Ukraine	Unnamed soldier	TCR and SS employee	Killed by explosives planted near military checkpoint	FSB (per Ukraine)
January 20, 2025	Odesa	Ukraine	Unnamed 54 year old man	Local entrepreneur and volunteer	Killed by explosives after being lured to his car	FSB (per Ukraine)
March 14, 2025	Odesa	Ukraine	Demyan Hanul	Ukrainian political activist, blogger and former soldier. Participant of Revolution of Dignity and the 2014 Odesa clashes	Shot in the head twice	Ukrainian deserter under Russian orders (per Ukraine)
April 4, 2025	Dnipro	Ukraine	Yuriy Fedko	Head of the Left Bank Administration of the Dnipro City Council	Killed by a car bomb	Russian intelligence (disputed)
June 12, 2025	near Kyiv	Ukraine	Demetre Darchia	Soldier in the Georgian Legion	Killed by an explosive device that blew up in his hands	Russian intelligence (per Georgian Legion)
June 10, 2025	Holosiivskyi District, Kyiv	Ukraine	Ivan Voronych	SBU colonel	Shot dead	FSB (per Ukraine) The Base (self-claim; disputed)
August 30, 2025	Sykhivskyi District, Lviv	Ukraine	Andriy Parubiy	Ukrainian politician, thirteenth chairman of the Verkhovna Rada and tenth secretary of the National Security and Defense Council	Shot dead	Russian intelligence (per Ukraine)
15 June 2026	Biała Podlaska	Poland	Semyon Skrepetsky	Russian artist known for critism and caricatures of Vladimir Putin, Ramzan Kadyrov and other Russian politicians.	Shot to death	Russian intelligence or Kadyrovites (allegedly)

== See also ==
- List of assassinations in Europe § Russia
- List of deaths during the Russian invasion of Ukraine
- List of Soviet assassinations
- List of assassinations by the United States
- List of Israeli assassinations
- List of journalists killed in Russia
- List of Second Chechen War assassinations
- Operations conducted by the Mossad
- Operation Condor
- List of Russian assassination attempts since 2022
- Suspicious Russia-related deaths since 2022
