= Pankisi Gorge crisis =

2000–2002 Russian-Georgian dispute

- Part of war on terror, Spillover of the Second Chechen War, and the Chechen-Russian conflict
- The location of the Pankisi Gorge in Georgia
Date	November 2000 – October 2002 (Note: The International Crisis Behaviour Project at Duke University defines the crisis as having lasted from 27 July 2002, the date of an attack by Chechen separatists on Russian forces at Itum-Kale in Russia, to 7 October 2002, when Russia and Georgia agreed to joint patrols on their mutual border. This period also included Russian airstrikes on Georgian territory, Georgia's most consequential security operation in the Gorge, and the final exit of Ruslan Gelayev. There had been an armed separatist presence in the Gorge since 1999, and Russia's forceful objections begun, at the latest, in November 2000. Russia's first coercive measures against Georgia took place the next month.)
Location	Pankisi Gorge, Kakheti, Georgia
Result	Armed Chechen separatists and Arab jihadists largely depart the Pankisi Gorge

Belligerents
(Georgia (country)) Georgia; Supported by: United States Russia	(Chechen Republic of Ichkeria) Chechen militants Mujahideen in Chechnya; Other jihadists

Commanders and leaders
(Georgia (country)) Eduard Shevardnadze (Georgia (country)) David Tevzadze (Georgia (country)) Devi Chankotadze (Georgia (country)) Giorgi Shervashidze (Georgia (country)) Nikoloz Janjgava (Russia) Vladimir Putin (Russia) Vladimir Mikhaylov	(Chechen Republic of Ichkeria) Ruslan Gelayev (Chechen Republic of Ichkeria) Abdul-Malik Mezhidov (Chechen Republic of Ichkeria) Muslim Atayev; Ibn al-Khattab; Abu Atiya

Strength
Over 1,000 Internal Troops of Georgia Unknown numbers of Georgian special forces	Hundreds of militants

Casualties and losses
One elderly civilian killed and several injured	At least one killed Dozens captured

The Pankisi Gorge crisis was a geopolitical dispute between Russia and Georgia concerning the presence of armed Chechen separatists and jihadists in Georgia, that peaked in 2002.

At the centre of the crisis was a contingent of Chechen separatist militants who sought shelter from Russian forces in the Pankisi Gorge area of Georgia, 25 miles south of Chechnya in the Russian Federation. Alongside the separatists were jihadists with alleged links to Al-Qaeda and Abu Musab al-Zarqawi.

From November 2000, Russian officials demanded that Georgia suppress the rebels by force and extradite any captives. They later threatened to invade the Pankisi Gorge to achieve those objectives if Georgia could or would not do so.

Rejecting Russia's demands, Georgian officials said that an armed operation in the Gorge could spark destabilising ethnic conflict, and told the U.S. that they did not have the military capacity to impose order there. Georgia also linked the issue to their own demand that Russia withdraw support from secessionists in the breakaway Georgian region of Abkhazia.

As part of the nascent war on terror, the United States, like Russia, wanted Georgia to regain control of the Gorge, both to suppress the jihadist threat and to contain the escalation in Georgia-Russian tensions. However, it also wanted to protect Georgia's sovereignty against Russian influence and to integrate Georgia within a U.S.-led international bloc. The U.S. set up a train-and-equip program, which it described as intended to help Georgia's military assert itself in the Gorge, and which also helped prepare Georgian troops to fight alongside the U.S. in Afghanistan and Iraq. Over the course of the crisis, Georgian special forces acting on U.S. intelligence conducted at least two operations to arrest suspected jihadists.

Pressure on Georgia to act peaked in mid-2002, with a series of Russian airstrikes on Pankisi and several U.S. statements that Georgia must act. The Georgian authorities initiated a major security operation in the Gorge, which was communicated to the militants in advance. The latter began to leave Georgian territory in September 2002. Together with Georgia's extradition of five alleged separatist militants, this caused tensions with Russia to subside to below crisis-level that October.

The Russian claims, sometimes implicating Georgia in supporting the terrorists, was perceived by the Georgian authorities and analysts as an information warfare aimed at expanding Russian influence by internationally discrediting Georgia, using the issue as a lever of pressure, and portraying Georgia as a fundamentally unstable state incapable of full sovereignty and unreliable for Western partners. However, the US support for the Russian claims actually provided raison d'être for facilitating US-Georgian military cooperation, giving Georgia the means to counterbalance Russian pressure but at the same time discontenting Russia which viewed the increasing US presence as undermining its hegemony over its traditional sphere of influence.

== Background ==
=== Caucasian separatism and Georgia–Russia tensions ===
Georgian-Russian relations were strained by Russia's support for two statelets that had seceded from Georgia in wars following the collapse of the Soviet Union. Meanwhile, Russia itself bore the brunt of several secessionist Caucasian wars. By 2002, roughly one fifth of Georgia's territory was held by Russian-backed forces and Russia had fought to establish control of Chechnya, Ingushetia and Dagestan.

During the South Ossetia war (1991–1992), Georgian forces were beaten back by local fighters backed by "irregulars from the Russian Federation, and stranded ex-Soviet soldiers who found themselves stuck in the middle of someone else's civil war and chose to fight on behalf of the secessionists." During the War in Abkhazia (1992–1993), Russia intervened both directly and covertly. North Caucasian volunteers, organized under the banner of the Confederation of Mountain Peoples of the Caucasus, travelled to fight alongside the Abkhaz separatists — something Chechen commander Ruslan Gelayev would later regret as a "Russian GRU operation". Gelayev and many other Chechen volunteers, including infamous Shamil Basayev, soon turned on Russia, fighting for the separatists in the Chechen–Russian conflict.

In 1997, Chechen President Aslan Maskhadov met Georgian President Eduard Shevardnadze and other officials in Tbilisi and Akhmeta, discussing the Chechen-Georgian cooperation. However, Georgia took a cautious approach to Chechen relations, bearing in memory the Chechen participation in the War in Abkhazia and not risking to anger Moscow by showing an overt support for the Chechen secessionist leadership.

=== Pankisi becomes a refuge for Chechen separatists ===
Pankisi had been the principal destination for Chechen migration to Georgia since the 19th Century. The Chechen-descended people who lived there became known as the Kists, and retained a strong Chechen identity. By 1989 less than half of Pankisi residents were of Chechen descent, but refugees from the Chechen wars since 1991 had swelled their population once more.

As the Second Chechen War got under way in 1999, 15,000 civilians fled to the Pankisi Gorge from Chechnya. Guerrillas also began to arrive in Pankisi, and their numbers swelled in subsequent years. In February 2000, Grozny, capital of the breakaway Chechen Republic of Ichkeria, fell to Russian forces. Separatist Chechen fighters fled, amongst them a force of around a thousand men under the command of Ruslan Gelayev. Gelayev's men sought shelter in the southern Chechen mountains, but were ambushed, and retreated to Gelayev's home village of Komsomolskoye (near Urus-Martan). The Chechens suffered another heavy defeat, and Gelayev decided to lead his men to take shelter in the Pankisi Gorge, 25 miles south of the Russian-Georgian border. Rumours that Gelayev had made his base there began around October 2000. Georgian officials later acknowledged that the government made an informal agreement with Gelayev's band, allowing them to remain in Pankisi as long as there was no violence within Georgia.

In late November 2000, FSB chief Nikolai Patrushev visited Tbilisi, and complained about the presence of organised Chechen separatists on Georgian soil. His Georgian counterparts retorted that, similarly, Russia hosted Abkhaz separatists.

In early December 2000, tensions escalated as Russia instituted a new visa regime for Georgians and briefly cut off gas and electricity to Tbilisi. At a 6 December press conference, presidential aide Sergey Yastrzhembsky said that the visa regime was introduced solely due to "our great concern for Chechen separatism and terrorism in some parts of Georgia." He claimed that there were at least 1,500 to 2,000 militants in the Gorge and its surrounding district, amongst some 7,000 Chechen refugees. Yastrzhembsky complained of "the flow of arms, medicines and munitions" from Georgia into Russia, "storage depots and hospitals" used by the militants, and military training "conducted on a daily basis." At this point, and throughout the ensuing crisis, President Shevardnadze and other officials attributed their unwillingness to immediately suppress the rebels to fear of inter-ethnic violence that would destabilise the country.

Through June 2001, Gelayev's camp continued to receive new volunteers. In September 2001, Russia forcefully renewed its demand for Georgia to eliminate the separatist presence on its soil and extradite a number of "terrorists" - Russia's generic term for the separatists - who had been arrested while crossing the border that June. Georgia stated it could extradite two named persons if they could be found, but emphasized that Russia itself hosted a former Georgian Security Minister Igor Giorgadze, who was accused by the Georgian government of attempting to assassinate President Shevardnadze in 1995.

=== The Mujahideen in Chechnya, the Global War on Terror, and the Freedom Agenda ===
Armed Chechen separatists had been growing closer to the transnational jihadist movement since the mid-1990s, in particular through the mostly-Arab volunteers who gathered in the Mujahideen in Chechnya organisation. Its leader at the beginning of 2002, Ibn al-Khattab, had met Osama bin Laden in Afghanistan, and had taken a group of Chechen militants to a training camp there in 1994. As of 1998, Arab mujahideen were training separatists inside Chechnya. The separatist Chechen Republic of Ichkeria had an indigenous Salafist current. Gelayev was not himself part of it, but his subordinate officer in the Gorge, Abdul-Malik Mezhidov, was.

Arab mujahideen began arriving in Pankisi in late 1999, and started soliciting volunteers for the Chechen jihad over the internet. They trained the volunteers in the valley, dispatched them to the command of the Mujahideen in Chechnya, and received hundreds of thousands of dollars in donations. The Arabs used some of that money to build local mosques, and a hospital.

The September 11 attacks led the U.S. to make the fight against transnational jihadism a priority. The George W. Bush administration sometimes found it useful to frame unrelated objectives, such as the 2003 invasion of Iraq, as part of a single Global War on Terror. Russia, among other states, recognised a political opportunity, and sought to use the issue of terrorism to advance its own interests in relations with the Bush administration. As a part of its information warfare against the Chechen republic of Ichkeria, Russia sought to link all Chechen separatists to international terrorists in order to remove the necessity of negotiating and solicit international support, including that of the US.

U.S. military assistance to Georgia had been ongoing at a low level since late 2000, under President Bill Clinton. Presidents Shevardnadze and Bush met in Washington D.C. on 5 October 2001. Shevardnadze offered his "full cooperation and full solidarity" in respect of America's budding campaign against Afghanistan, including free use of Georgian airspace. He received in return a promise of military training and equipment. Shevardnadze claimed that Bush would oppose any Russian military intervention in Georgia, while other sources said that Bush had stressed the need to deal with Russia's Pankisi concerns.

In a speech later that day, Shevardnadze declared: "Georgia is not the southern flank of Russia’s strategic space, but rather the northern flank of a horizontal band of Turkish and NATO strategic interests, running from Turkey and Israel to Central Asia." Secretary of Defense Donald Rumsfeld visited Tbilisi that December.

=== 2001 Kodori crisis ===
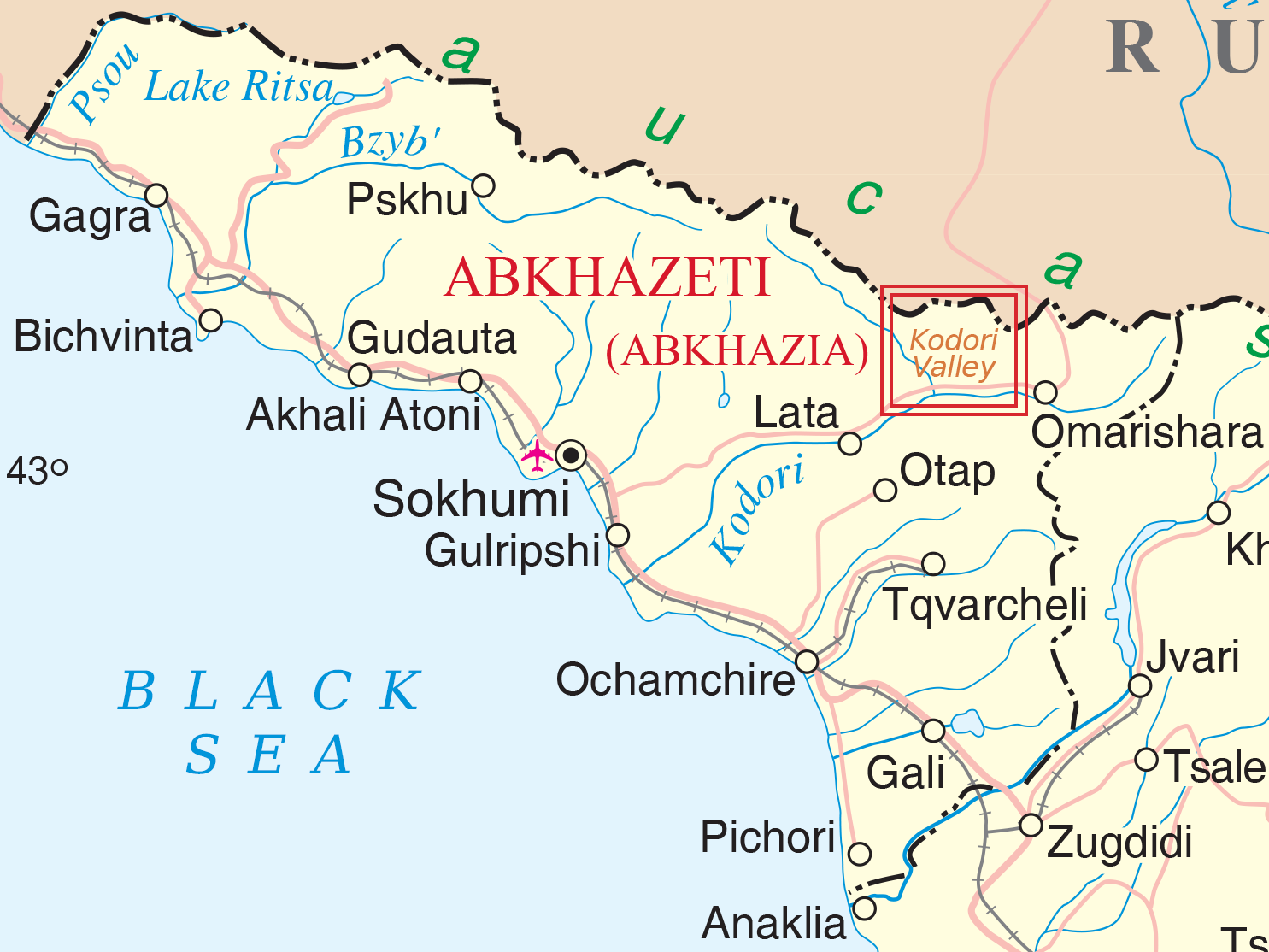
A map showing the Kodori Valley inside Abkhazia, with Russia to the north and the rest of Georgia to the south-east. In 2001 the northern part of the valley was controlled by forces loyal to Tbilisi.

On 4 October 2001, fighters under the command of Gelayev crossed from part of Abkhazia that was then still controlled by the Georgian government (Note: After losing control of most of Abkhazia in the 1992-1993 war, Georgia retained nominal authority over Upper Abkhazia, a slice of territory which included the Upper Kodori Valley, bordering Russia. In practice, the valley was run by Emzar Kvitsiani, a local warlord. The valley's lower portion, which follows the Kodori river down toward the sea, near Sukhumi, was separatist held. Georgia later lost control of Upper Abkhazia at the 2008 Battle of the Kodori Valley.) into separatist territory. The force attacked the village of Giorgievskoe, less than 30 km from the separatist capital, Sokhumi.

Abkhazia had achieved de facto independence from Georgia in 1992, in no small part due to the intervention of volunteers like Gelayev, and retained the support of Moscow. Gelayev's group took at least two villages and fought until at least 12 October, before they were repelled by Abkhaz troops and Russian airstrikes.

Gelayev's force would have needed to cross more than 250 km of Georgian territory from Pankisi before entering Abkhazia, which gave rise to the belief that the operation had been sponsored by the Georgian government in order to enlist Chechen fighters to retake Abkhazia, while Gelayev sought to open "second front" against Russia by attacking a Russian military base in Gudauta. Russian media reported that Chechens captured by Abkhaz forces had claimed that President Eduard Shevardnadze had personally approved the operation. Some suggested, albeit without evidence, that the transmission of the force from Pankisi to Abkhazia may have been orchestrated with the Russian support by some Georgian officials, possibly interior minister Kakha Targamadze, to discredit Shevardnadze and replace him as the president of Georgia. Other reports simply said that Interior Ministry officials provided vehicles. Both the interior minister and state security minister were replaced by Shevadrnadze on 21 November 2001; a move intended to signal a new approach to Pankisi. The new state security minister later said that one of his first acts was to ask the militants there to leave. He said the militants thanked him for their two years' respite, and promised to leave. However, they did not do so for nearly another year.

Russia demanded Gelayev's extradition from Georgia in November 2001. Throughout the ensuing year's crisis, Georgia continued to claim that it was willing to extradite Gelayev, but was unable to locate him.

== Events of 2002 ==
Russia and Georgia were engaged in talks at the ministerial level by early January 2002.

=== Georgia's first operation in Pankisi and arrests of alleged Arab jihadists ===
In mid-January, Georgia launched a police operation in the Pankisi area, and claimed to have arrested a number of drug traffickers. But two policemen were kidnapped and held for two days shortly afterward, raising doubts about the authorities' real level of control. Russia's defense minister Sergei Ivanov then chipped in, suggesting that Pankisi was turning into a "mini-Afghanistan," and raising the prospect of a joint Russian-Georgian operation to clear it out. Georgian officials immediately dismissed that notion, too, but said that Georgia was open to collaborating with the U.S.

On 9 February, Georgia's Security Minister told the cabinet that a number of Jordanian and Saudi nationals had been arrested in the Pankisi Gorge, after plotting attacks in Russia. Two days later, U.S. charge d'affaires Philip Remler said that fighters from Afghanistan had arrived in Pankisi, and were in contact with Ibn al-Khattab, a Saudi Islamist who was leading fighters against Russia in Chechnya, and who had links to Bin Laden.

Russia's Foreign Minister Igor Ivanov claimed on 15 February that Osama Bin Laden might be hiding in the Akhmeta Municipality, the administrative district that contained the Gorge. Georgian officials dismissed the claim, saying that it would not be possible to flee Afghanistan for Pankisi Gorge without crossing six countries and the Caspian Sea.

=== U.S. launches Georgia Train and Equip Program ===
On 26 February, senior U.S. officials said that they had begun providing combat helicopters to the Georgian military, and would soon begin training troops, too. A scoping mission had visited Georgia earlier that month. Russian President Vladimir Putin said the plan was "no tragedy," and no different than the U.S.'s existing presence in central Asia.

According to Georgian sources, funding had been hurried up for the Georgia Train and Equip Program (GTEP) within the U.S. government by linking it to Operation Enduring Freedom: the invasion of Afghanistan. As well as its publicly stated goal, of preparing Georgia to take control of Pankisi, the GTEP enabled Georgian troops to better support the U.S. in Afghanistan and in Iraq, and allowed Georgia to deepen its security relationship with the United States.

On 11 March 2002, US President George W. Bush stated that "terrorists working closely with al Qaeda operate in the Pankisi Gorge."

On 28 March, Russian Defence Minister Ivanov held a press conference to denounce Washington's plan to send Green Berets on a training mission to Georgia, and hinted obliquely at the prospect of Russian intervention.

On 28 April a Georgian unit, acting on U.S. intelligence and led by a U.S.-trained commander, ambushed a group of insurgents in Pankisi by ramming their vehicle, and then firing on it, killing the driver. The ambush sparked consternation among militants in the area, who initiated 24-hour patrols and lookouts. The Georgians captured three Arabs, of whom one, a Yemeni named Omar Mohammed Ali al-Rammah, was subsequently transferred to U.S. custody and incarcerated in Guantanamo Bay. Al-Rammah told interrogators, falsely, that Ibn al-Khattab had been killed in the ambush.

On 19 May, about 50 United States Army Special Forces arrived in Georgia as part of the Georgia Train and Equip Program to "address the situation in the Pankisi Gorge," joining an advance team that had been in-country for weeks. They were members of 2nd Battalion, 10th Special Forces Group, based at Fort Carson, Colorado. The contingent was slated to rise to 150 over time. The Pentagon said that the Green Berets would not participate in military operations in Georgia, and the mission commander stated that his men did not expect to visit Pankisi. Russian President Vladimir Putin had publicly welcomed the mission, describing the U.S. as an ally against terrorists on Russia's borders.

=== Itum Kale attack and Russian airstrikes ===
On 27 July, 50 to 60 Chechen fighters launched an attack near Itum-Kale in Russia, 15 miles north of Georgia, killing eight soldiers. Russian officials claimed that the attack had been launched from inside Georgia. Georgia initially denied the claim, but then on 3 and 5 August announced that it had arrested 13 men who had survived the fighting at Itum-Kale as they tried to cross back into Georgia amidst Russian shellfire. In those days, Russian aircraft also bombed locations two miles inside Georgia, killing only sheep. Russia demanded the extradition of the 13 captured fighters, and set about fulfilling Georgia's requests for relevant paperwork.

On 30 July and 7 August, Russian aircraft bombed the Pankisi area. Georgia accused Russia of violating its airspace.

On 12 August, Sergei Ivanov suggested that the only way to resolve the situation was for Russian special troops to enter the area, as Russian diplomats sought to gather support for an intervention force. However, Georgia refused any Russian proposals. According to Russian analyst Sergei Karaganov, "people in Tbilisi now realize that they have to address this problem somehow, but they are reluctant to do so in conjunction with Russia... They [the Georgian leadership] want to compel the Americans to go in there. But from Russia's standpoint this is an intolerable problem."

On 23 August, Russian aircraft bombed the Pankisi village of Matani, leaving an elderly shepherd dead and wounding seven other people. Russia blamed Georgia for the strike, but observers from the Organization for Security and Co-operation in Europe had tracked the planes from Russian airspace.

=== Georgia launches a second operation in Pankisi ===
In August, under pressure from Russia and the U.S., Georgia prepared a second major operation in the Gorge. However, rather than attempting to confront and capture the militants, Georgian officials first met with Pankisi community leaders, and told them that the rebels would have to go. According to David Bakradze, then of Georgia's National Security Council, the officials aimed to persuade the rebels to leave on their own accord, and so avoid a direct confrontation on Georgian soil. For the same reason, President Shevardnadze had waited until the fighting season, when rebel militants were more likely to be in Chechnya, and announced the operation publicly, days in advance. The Russian ambassador grumbled that the militants were "being squeezed out rather than being destroyed, or their progress being blocked." Russian officials said that Georgia should not simply push out the rebels but arrest them and hand over them to Russia, or their bodies if killed.

Georgian President Eduard Shevardnadze accused Russia of "jacking up tension" in order to blackmail Georgia and "invade not just Pankisi, but Tbilisi as well". Russian President, Vladimir Putin, on the other hand accused Georgia of "making a show instead of real efforts to combat Chechen militants".

On 25 August, Georgia's second major operation in Pankisi began. Around 1,000 troops under the command of the Interior Ministry entered the area in armoured vehicles, and set up checkpoints.

Around 31 August, President Shevardnadze stated that Gelayev was an "educated person," and that Shevardnadze had seen no evidence that the separatist leader was a terrorist. Georgian officials continued to say they could not find Gelayev.

On 2 September, Georgia announced that it had detained six criminals and an Arab (named Khaled Oldal, Halid Oldali, or Khalid Omar Mal) in the operation launched a week earlier, which had encountered no resistance. President Shevardnadze declared the Pankisi Gorge fully under control, but noted the possible continued presence of several dozen guerrillas, including Arabs. Other officials were less definitive, promising continued operations. Georgia also announced plans to deploy additional troops in zones bordering Chechnya and Ingushetia.

=== Under pressure, Gelayev's force leaves the Gorge ===
On 15 September, a Russian official later claimed, around 200 fighters crossed the border from Georgia into Ingushetia. They were commanded by Gelayev, Abdul-Malik Mezhidov and Muslim Atayev, and accompanied by Roddy Scott, a British photojournalist.

On 26 September, Gelayev's force in Ingushetia was identified and engaged by Russian forces at the Battle of Galashki. Gelayev and Mezhidov lost 30 to 80 men, and the Russians 18. Gelayev himself was wounded, and his unit dispersed into Kabardino-Balkaria and Ingushetia.

On 27 September, the Interior Minister announced that the military phase of the operation that had begun just over a month earlier had ended, and that there no longer were any Chechen guerrillas in the Gorge or the surrounding area. However, two hostages remained held in the Gorge, and subsequent reports pointed to a continued militant presence.

On 4 October, Georgia extradited to Russia five of the Russian citizens who had been arrested between 3 and 5 August as they crossed into Georgia amidst Russian shellfire, after the attack at Itum-Kale. The extraditions were subsequently found to be unlawful.

On 6 October, Putin and Shevardnadze met on the sidelines of a Commonwealth of Independent States summit in Chisinau, Moldova and agreed verbally to cooperate on matters pertaining to their countries' shared border. An agreement on border cooperation was signed by the commanders of the two countries' border guards on 17 October in Yerevan, Armenia.

According to Yevgeny Primakov, Prime Minister of Russia from 1998 to 1999, Russian-Georgian tensions "eased when Georgian special forces went to work in the Pankisi Gorge, taking several rebels into custody and turning them over to the Russian special services." Primakov wrote that some saw this as the result of pressure from the United States, who wanted to stabilise Russian-Georgian relations.

In an early October operation, according to one report, Georgian forces captured 15 Arabs in Pankisi, among them the Al-Qaeda leader known as Saif al-Islam al-Masri. Other reports referred to al-Masri's capture having had taken place in the summer, and to "over 13" Arab fighters having been turned over to the U.S. that Autumn by Georgia. By late October, according to yet another report, Georgia had netted about a dozen Arab militants, including "two mid-level Al-Qaeda leaders."

At an unspecified point in the Autumn, Georgian forces beat back a group of some 30 mostly-Chechen fighters who tried to cross into Georgia from Russia, officials claimed. The group was forced into the path of Russian soldiers, who were said to have killed many of them.

On 22 November, at the NATO summit in Prague, President Shevardnadze officially requested, for the first time, that Georgia join NATO, a step in his effort to draw Georgia into a closer relationship to the alliance.

== South Ossetian and Abkhazian tension ==
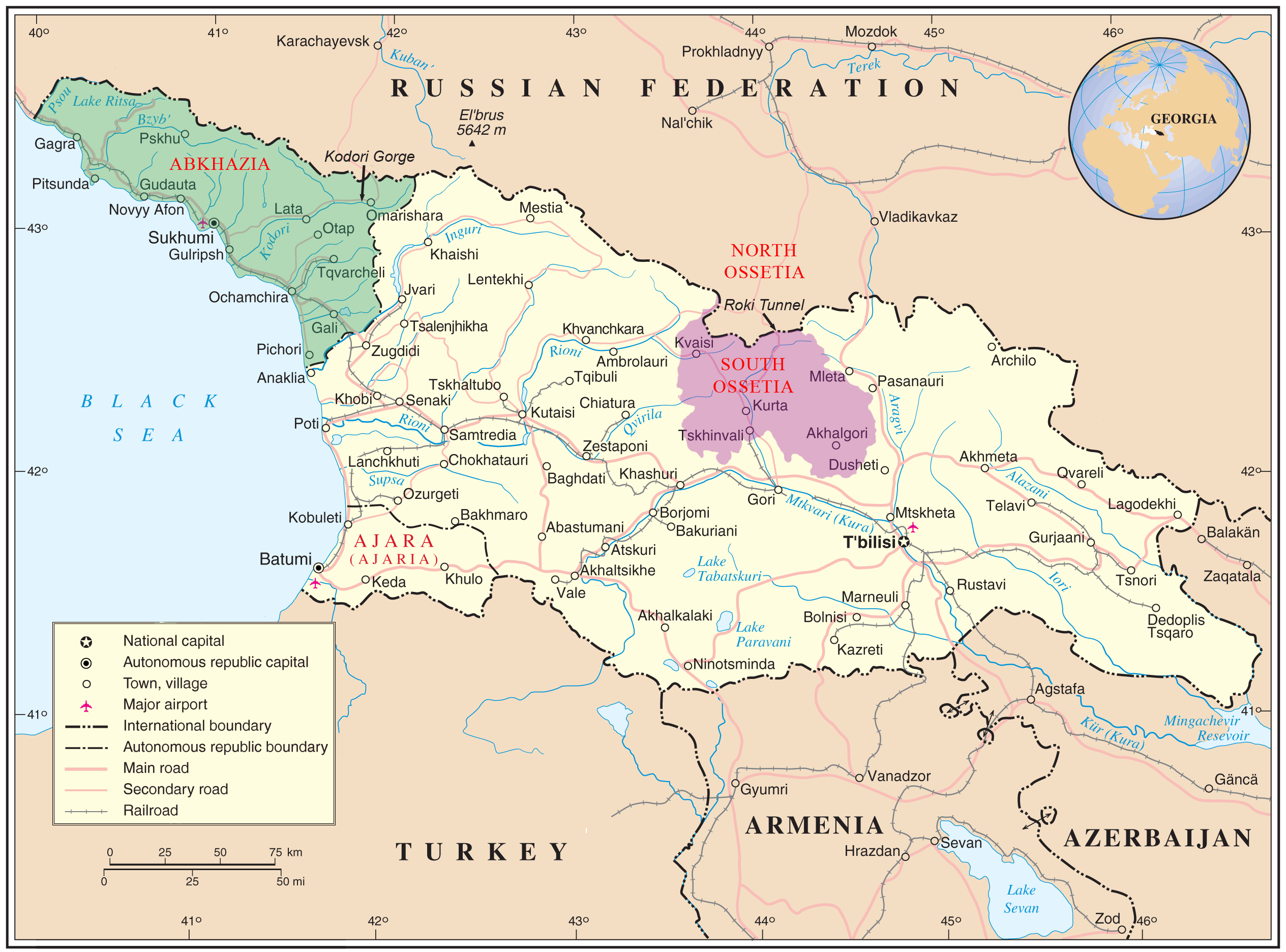
A map of Georgia with South Ossetia shaded purple and, to its east, the district of Akhmeta, which contains the Pankisi Gorge. Abkhazia is shaded green.

In October 2002, the South Ossetian government viewed the operations in the Pankisi Gorge as a threat to their breakaway state, calling up the separatist reservists for a potential all out conflict with Georgia. The tension peaked when Georgian president Shevardnadze said it would "be reasonable" to expand the security sweep operation in the Pankisi Gorge into South Ossetia. Specifically, the Georgian government cited a massive increase in crime in South Ossetia, claiming that the separatists did not have a functioning security service to protect its residents. Konstantin Kochiev, a South Ossetian diplomat, stated that in an effort to placate the Georgian government's concerns, that South Ossetia would undergo extensive police reform. The suggestion for an expanded operation zone was quickly shot down by the National Security Council stating that any operation in South Ossetia would result in armed conflict with the separatists. There was also heightened concern among the separatists that the cooperation between Georgia and Russia in the Pankisi Gorge could result in Russian support for the Georgian government's restoration in South Ossetia.

On 1 March 2002, the Abkhaz separatist leaders, including an envoy to Russia Igor Akhba, announced their plans to establish associated relationship with Russia, claiming that the stronger Georgian army might attempt to retake the region. The move came after the Bush administration offered to send 200 troops to Georgia and the United States European Command transferred 10 unarmed helicopters to Georgia for the operations in the Pankisi Gorge. Georgia's ambassador to Russia, Zurab Abashidze linked this to "hysteria" in the Russian press about the deployment of American trainers to Georgia, saying: "If our Russian colleagues are concerned about the situation in the Pankisi Gorge, why should they be concerned about American assistance?". The Russian Foreign Minister stated that "proposed deployment appears to be much larger than what the Russians had been told". Russian President Vladimir Putin did not comment on the separatist proposals, but said that Russia "respects Georgia's territorial integrity".

== Claims of chemical and biological weapon plots to attack Europe and the prelude to the Iraq War ==
In 2001, an alleged jihadist operative named Abu Atiya reportedly arrived in the Pankisi Gorge, having been dispatched by Abu Musab al-Zarqawi, leader of Jama'at al-Tawhid wal-Jihad. Al-Zarqawi had founded a training camp in Afghanistan with the support of Al-Qaeda, but was not himself a member. After he fought against the Americans during their 2001 invasion, he moved to Iraq.

A French intelligence report dated 6 November 2002, later filed in a court case, stated that Abu Atiya was based in Georgia, where he was in charge of preparations for chemical attacks in Europe. According to the Wall Street Journal, around that time an alleged Al-Qaeda member who had been captured by the U.S. in March 2002 said under interrogation that Abu Atiya had dispatched nine men of North African descent to Europe in 2001 to prepare attacks.

On 30 December, the U.S. Department of Defense and Georgia's Ministry of Defense signed an agreement to cooperate on the prevention of proliferation of "technology, pathogens and expertise" related to biological weapons. The agreement, marking an evolution of a Weapons of Mass Destruction non-proliferation relationship between the two countries that begun in 1997, led to the construction of the Lugar Research Center in Tbilisi, with substantial U.S. funding. The timing of the 30 December agreement has been linked to the U.S. having then recently come to believe that a biological weapons plot was being fomented by jihadists in Pankisi.

On 5 January 2003, police in London arrested a number of men of North African descent over what was known at the time as the Wood Green ricin plot. Shortly afterward, 21 further men of North African descent, with reported links to both the alleged British cell and Salafi-jihadist groups in North Africa, were arrested in Italy and Spain. Explosive and chemical materials were reportedly recovered. There were further arrests in Britain, for a total of 20.

British investigators rapidly ascertained that no ricin had, in fact, been discovered, but this fact was not made public until 2005. (One of the men arrested in Britain was ultimately convicted of conspiracy to cause a public nuisance by spreading ricin; the other accused men were found not guilty.)

=== Public allegations and the U.S. case for the Iraq War ===
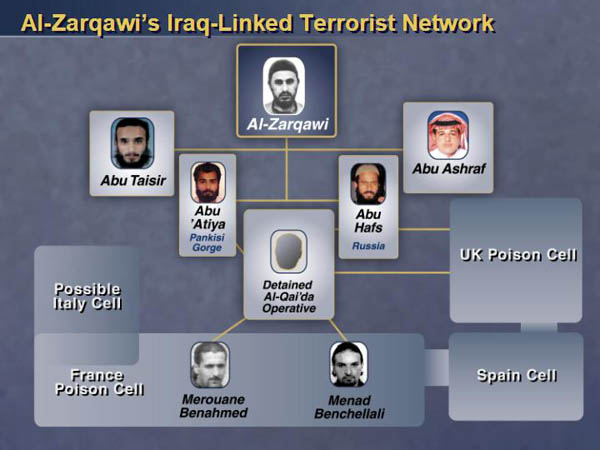
A slide from Colin Powell's 5 February 2003 presentation to the United Nations, alleging a link between Musab al-Zarqawi, an operative in the Pankisi Gorge, and Al-Qaeda cells in European countries

In Colin Powell's presentation to the United Nations Security Council on 5 February 2003, the Secretary of State claimed that associates of Musab al-Zarqawi had

been active in the Pankisi Gorge, Georgia and in Chechnya, Russia. The plotting to which they are linked is not mere chatter. Members of Zarqawi's network say their goal was to kill Russians with toxins.

Powell showed a slide that depicted a purported Al-Qaeda network under the command of al-Zarqawi, including a bearded man labelled as Abu Atiya, located in Pankisi, Georgia. Amongst others depicted on the slide were Menad Benchellali, who had passed through Pankisi and had been arrested in France in December 2002, and Abu Hafs al-Urduni, a jihadist fighting in Chechyna, who has also been linked to the Gorge.

Days later, at the Munich Security Conference, Defence Minister Sergei Ivanov of Russia claimed that "makeshift ricin laboratories" had been found in Pankisi. He added that the situation in the valley was "unchanged," despite Georgia's operations the previous year, and it continued to shelter "terrorist bases."

On 12 February, Powell told the House International Relations Committee that, "The ricin that is bouncing around Europe now originated in Iraq - not in the part of Iraq that is under Saddam Hussein's control, but his security forces know all about it." European intelligence officers who spoke to CNN at the time said that the ricin samples discovered in Britain had been manufactured domestically, rather than in Iraq, but in reality no ricin had been found at all.

The same CNN report said that alleged terrorist operatives arrested in Europe had been trained in biological and chemical weapons techniques in either the Pankisi Gorge or Chechnya.

== Aftermath ==
Abu Atiya was arrested in Azerbaijan on 12 August 2003 and deported to Jordan the next month.

By June 2003, roughly 50 militants were said to have remained in the gorge, down from estimates of between 700 and 1,500 at different points in the years prior to September 2002. The residual presence was nonetheless frustrating for at least one Western diplomat, who wanted Georgia to take firmer action.

On May 14, 2004, France arrested two Algerians allegedly working with chemical and biological weapons. Georgia announced the end of the Pankisi operation and withdrew its Internal Troops from the region by January 21, 2005.

In 2008, the valley was reported to be peaceful despite the nearby Russo-Georgian war, and substantial numbers of refugees from Chechnya remained living there

In April 2013, one Chechen fighter who had lived in the Pankisi estimated that around one hundred Kists and Chechens from the Gorge were then fighting in Syria against the government of Bashar al-Assad in the Syrian civil war.

The former senior Islamic State leader Tarkan Batirashvili, otherwise known as "Omar the Chechen," grew up in Pankisi, which was still home to some of his family as of 2014. In 2014, Batirashvilii reportedly threatened to return to the area to lead a Muslim attack on Russian Chechnya. However, the threat never came into fruition, and Batirashvili was killed during a battle in the Iraqi town of Al-Shirqat in 2016.

In 2016, a man by the name of Jakolo, styling himself the representative of the Islamic State in Georgia, gave an interview to a journalist in the Pankisi village of Jokolo.

== List of jihadists and North-Caucasian separatists associated with the Pankisi Gorge ==
=== First active in Pankisi before 2000 ===
- Abdulla Kurd (1977–2011), Kurdish jihadist said to have transited through Pankisi on his way to fight in Chechnya. The RIA Novosti agency reported that he did so in 1991: if that and his reported birth date are accurate, he would have turned 14 the year he crossed into Chechnya - it is possible that one or both are incorrect. He later became the fifth and last emir of the foreign Mujahideen in Chechnya organization.
- Khaled Youssef Mohammed al-Emirat (1969–2011), known as Muhannad, a Jordanian jihadist. According to the Russian FSB, he arrived in the north Caucasus in 1999, and crossed into Chechnya from Pankisi. He later became the fourth emir of the foreign mujahideen in Chechnya.
- Ibn al-Khattab (1969–2002), first emir of the Arab Mujahideen in Chechnya, was alleged by Russia in February 2002 to have been hiding in the gorge, just weeks before he was killed in Chechnya.

=== North-Caucasian separatists first active in Pankisi during the crisis ===
- Ruslan Gelayev (1964–2004), Chechen separatist commander, operated in the Gorge from mid-2000 to September 2002. His family reportedly lived in the village of Omalo.
- Abdul-Malik Mezhidov (1961–2009), a Salafist and former Brigadier General of the Chechen Republic of Ichkeria who fled with Gelayev to Pankisi, and followed him back into Russia in 2002.
- Muslim Atayev (1973–2005) led a contingent of some 20-30 volunteers from Kabardino-Balkaria that formed in the Pankisi Gorge training camps, under the command of Gelayev.
- Zelimkhan Khangoshvili (1979–2019), platoon commander for the Chechen Republic of Ichkeria during the Second Chechen war, and later Georgian military officer and alleged intelligence informant. Khangoshvili was born in Duisi village and was assassinated by the FSB in Berlin.
- Dokka Umarov (1964–2013) was a Chechen separatist militant from the mid-1990s and from 2007 the leader of the Islamist Caucasus Emirate. He reportedly took shelter in the Pankisi Gorge from 2001 to 2002.
- The Akhmadov brothers, Chechen separatist militants, said to have remained in Pankisi after Gelayev's contingent had left.

=== Transnational jihadists first active in Pankisi during the crisis ===
- Saif al-Islam al-Masri, presumed nom de guerre of an Egyptian mujahed alleged to be a member of Al-Qaida's Shura council, reported captured in the Gorge in early October 2002. Another report identifies him as a member of Al-Qaeda's military committee captured over the summer. Masri (also transliterated Masry) was alleged to have been trained by Hezbollah and to have fought in Somalia.
- Abu Hafs al-Urduni (1973–2006), third Emir of the Mujahideen in Chechnya, was likely the "Abu Hafsi" reported to have been "running financial operations in the gorge," and to have supervised the building of a hospital for fighters, but to have escaped to Chechnya before being apprehended.
- Abu Atiya, jihadist and local subordinate of Musab al-Zarqawi, operated in the Gorge around 2001–2002.
- Saïd Arif (1965–2015), Algerian Salafi-jihadist associated with Abu Qatada and Al-Qaeda, lived in the Gorge from around May 2001 to early 2003, with the exception of a period inside Chechnya and a trip to see his family in Sweden.
- Anna Sundberg (1971–present), Arif's wife, later author and politician, lived with him in the village of Duisi from June to November 2001.
- Menad Benchellali, convicted as part of the Chechen Network case, met Arif in the Gorge.
- Omar Mohammed Ali al-Rammah, a Yemeni Jihadist arrested in Pankisi in April 2002 and subsequently transferred to U.S. custody and the Guantanamo Bay detention facility.
- Khaled Oldal (also reported as Halid Oldali and Khalid Omar Mali), was arrested by Georgian authorities in Pankisi in the week before 2 September 2002. He was alleged to have associated with both a separatist commander, likely Gelayev, and an "international terrorist organisation." He was described in reports both as a French citizen of Moroccan descent, and an Arab holding a possibly-fake French passport. He was said to have arrived in Georgia in 1999 and fought alongside the rebels in Chechnya.

=== First active post-Pankisi Gorge crisis, including Syrian civil war ===
- Akhmed Chatayev (1980–2017), Chechen militant and Islamic State leader, lived in the Gorge for two years up to September 2012.
- Tarkan Batirashvili, known as Omar al-Shishani, (1986–2016), Islamic State leader, grew up in Pankisi.
- Tamaz Batirashvili (killed 2018), older brother of Tarkan, fought alongside him in Syria.
- Hamzat and Khalid Borchashvili, brothers, killed in Syria, lived in the Gorge until 13 and 11 years old respectively. Hamzat was the first husband of Seda Dudurkaeva, who after his death married Tarkan Batirashvili.
- Giorgi Kushtanashvili, known by noms de guerre including Salahuddin Shishani (killed 2017), a fighter in Chechnya and leader of minor jihadist organisations in Syria was born in Duisi village.
- Cezar Tokhosashvili, known as Al-Bara Shishani, recruited as a supporter of ISIS by Chatayev, arrested in Kyiv in 2019 and extradited to Georgia.
- Murat Akhmetovich Margoshvili, known as Muslim Shishani, was born in Duisi and later fought in the first and second Chechen wars, and in the Syrian civil war
- Abu Musa al Shishani reportedly has roots in Pankisi
- Feyzullah Margoshvili, born Giorgi Kushtanashvili in Duisi, known in Syria as Salahuddin Shishani (killed 2017)

== See also ==
- Lopota Gorge hostage crisis
