= Abdulla Kurd =

Kurdish Islamist militant (born 1977)

5th Emir of the Mujahideen in Chechnya
- In office 21 April 2011 – 3 May 2011
- Preceded by: Muhannad
- Succeeded by: Position vacant

Personal details
- Born: 20 April 1977 Solhan, Bingöl Province, Turkey
- Died: 3 May 2011 (aged 34) Sharo-Argun, Chechnya, Russia
- Military career
- Allegiance: Caucasus Emirate
- Conflicts: Second Chechen War; North Caucasus Insurgency

Abdulla Kurd (sometimes Abdullah Kurd, and also known as Abdullah al-Kurdi or Salahuddin), (born Cevdet Döğer; 20 April 1977– 3 May 2011), was a Kurdish Islamist militant who was a commander of the Mujahideen in Chechnya. Kurd was the top deputy to Saudi-born field commander Abu al-Walid. Following Muhannad's capture and assassination near the village of Serzhen-Yurt on 21 April 2011, according to the Russian National Anti-Terrorist Committee, Kurd assumed Muhannad's position. Kurd was killed by Russian security forces in the Cheberloevsky area of Chechnya on 3 May 2011.

== Early life and rebel activity ==
Little is known of Kurd's early life, but he is said to have been born as Cevdet Döğer, a Kurd from Turkey, namely the town of Solhan located in Bingöl Province. He would have traveled from his native town to Chechnya in 1999 after transiting through the Pankisi Gorge in Georgia. Russian intelligence claims that Kurd fought in the battalion of foreign fighters led by Ibn al-Khattab during the Second Chechen War, and was closely involved in planning and organizing large-scale acts of sabotage and terrorism throughout the region. He established a close connection with the Saudi mujahid Abu al-Walid until al-Walid was killed in 2004. Following Abu Hafs al-Urduni's death in 2006 and Muhannad's promotion to the post of Emir of foreign fighters in Chechnya, Kurd became deputy chief emissary for al-Qaeda in the North Caucasus, according to Russia's National Anti-terrorism Committee (NAK).

At his death Turkish and Georgian identity papers, belonging to "Cevdet Döğer", were found in Kurd's baggage, which were released by the Russian Government soon afterwards. However, the Turkish and Georgian governments both stated that there was not such a person registered in their databases, which means that the documents are likely to be false. The indicated date of birth, April 20, 1977, also was very doubtful because this would mean that he joined the battle at the age of 14.

== Death ==
Kurd was killed on 3 May 2011 in a special operation near the village of Sharo-Argun, in the Cheberloevsky area of Chechnya. According to the Russian NAK, a contingent of pro-Moscow Chechen Federal Security Service (FSB) troops along with Russian Ministry of Internal Affairs (MVD) forces conducting search and reconnaissance activities in forested, mountainous terrain came across Kurd and a Dagestani militant; both were killed in the ensuing skirmish.

A rebel account of Kurd's death released nearly two years later offered new information. According to Kavkaz Center, Russian forces located and surrounded a small rebel base acting on a tip from Beslan Algiriyev, an FSB plant in the militant ranks. Four fighters were present at the encampment: killed alongside Kurd was a 24-year-old Dagestani militant identified as Ramzan Bartiyev, while two others identified as Aburayk Yusupkhadzhiyev and Isa Vagapov were wounded but escaped the encirclement (only later to be killed alongside Khuseyn Gakayev in January 2013). Algiriyev's status as an agent of the FSB was eventually discovered, and he was executed on 22 August 2011.

Kurd's Turkish passport containing visas to Georgia, Azerbaijan, and Pakistan was recovered at the scene and later displayed via Russian news outlets which claimed he was in communication with Osama bin Laden.

== See also ==
- Chechen mujahideen
