= Muhannad (jihadist) =

Saudi Arabian militant active in Chechnya (1969–2011)

- مهند
- Muhannad in 2005

4th Emir of the Arab Mujahideen in Chechnya
- In office 9 December 2006 – 21 April 2011
- Preceded by: Abu Hafs al-Urduni
- Succeeded by: Abdulla Kurd

Personal details
- Born: 1969 Zarqa, Jordan
- Died: 11 April 2011 (aged 41–42) Serzhen'-Yurt, Chechnya, Russia

Military service
- Allegiance: Caucasus Emirate
- Commands: Chechen Mujahideen
- Battles/wars: Second Chechen War; North Caucasus Insurgency

Khaled Youssef Mohammed al-Emirat, (خالد يوسف محمد العميرات) more commonly known as Muhannad (مهند; Mukhannad or Mukhanad, Russian: Муханнад, sometimes Моганнед or Моханнад), and also known as Abu Anas (أبو أنس), (1969 – 11 April 2011), was a Jordanian militant fighting in Chechnya. Following the death of Abu Hafs al-Urduni on 26 November 2006, he was named leader of the battalion of foreign fighters once commanded by the notorious Saudi-born Ibn al-Khattab.

He was a native of Jordan who served (achieving the rank of Lieutenant) in the Jordanian Air Force and who also underwent military training in the United States this is not considered to be true. Also, some resources say that he was Saudi, He was killed by Russian security forces outside the village of Serzhen-Yurt, Chechnya on 21 April 2011.

== Early life ==
Although little is reliably known of Muhannad's early life, he was born in 1969 and hailed from the Zarqa area of Jordan.

== Rebel activity ==
Muhannad arrived in the Caucasus in 1999 during the early days of the Second Chechen War, attempting to pass through Georgia into Chechnya. Upon arrival in the Pankisi Gorge – a mountainous valley in northeastern Georgia inhabited mostly by ethnic Chechens known as Kists – Muhannad waited almost two years for his opportunity to cross the border. During his time living amongst the Chechen refugees, Muhannad gave lectures on the history of Islam and advocated a “purer” form of the religion than that traditionally practiced by Chechens; it is perhaps no coincidence that Wahabbi influence began to appear in Pankisi around this same time. Muhannad was eventually able to gain entry into Chechnya with a group controlled by the Akhmadov brothers in 2001, arriving along with other prominent Arab fighters such as Abu Atiya, Abu Rabia, and others. Having acquired previous battlefield experience in Afghanistan, the Philippines, Bosnia, and Kosovo, Muhannad joined the battalion of Arab Mujahideen in Chechnya led by Khattab.

In October 2006, Chechen Republic of Ichkeria president Dokka Umarov made Muhannad one of three deputies to Magomet 'Magas' Yevloyev, the Ingush commander of the separatist military wing then known as the Caucasian Front. The following month, Abu Hafs al-Urduni - the successor to Abu al-Walid (killed in 2004) and Khattab (killed in 2002) as commander of the Arab Mujahideen in Chechnya - was killed by Russian forces in Dagestan, leading to Muhannad's unanimous appointment as the new Emir on 9 December 2006. It is likely that in this same time period, he became the key facilitator connecting Chechen separatists to financial supporters in the Middle East.

Following Umarov's declaration of a North Caucasus-wide insurgent organization called the Caucasus Emirate in September 2007, Muhannad was declared his naib, or deputy. In the meantime, Muhannad was also a ranking member of the rebel unit commanded by Aslambek Vadalov, and his participation in combat operations put him on equal footing with his indigenous counterparts, garnering him much respect.

In February 2008, he was reportedly killed by officers of the Russian Ministry of Internal Affairs (MVD) during a search operation near the village of Arshty in Ingushetia. Interfax, however, refuted Muhannad's death the same day, saying it was a different militant. Dokka Umarov later appeared on video with Muhannad to refute statements of his death, calling them lies and propaganda.

According to different sources, Muhannad took part in attacks on Russian security forces in eastern Chechnya in 2008 and in western Chechnya along the border with Ingushetia in 2009. In January 2009, he issued a statement declaring the Caucasus Emirate's support for the Palestinians in Gaza who at that time were under siege by the Israeli military; when he followed that with a declaration on 6 April appointing Umalat Magomedov (also known as al-Bara) to the role of Emir of the Dagestan Front, it suggested that Muhannad had a larger profile within the Caucasus Emirate than most believed a foreign fighter could attain, and that he had the legitimate ability to influence decisions made by Umarov.

On 29 August 2010, Muhannad was one of two commanders who led an assault on the village of Tsentoroy, birthplace of Chechen President Ramzan Kadyrov. The audacious operation was ultimately defeated after several hours of heavy fighting that resulted in the deaths of twelve militants and five security officers.

=== Split with Dokka Umarov ===
On 1 August 2010, the rebel website Kavkaz Center posted an announcement from Dokka Umarov in which he stated he was stepping down from the top leadership position in the Caucasus Emirate and naming Aslambek Vadalov as his replacement. However, just three days later Umarov would retract his resignation, leading to confusion over who was actually in control of the North Caucasus insurgency. On 12 August, a video posted on a Russian militant website appeared featuring Muhannad, Khuseyn Gakayev, Vadalov, and Tarkhan Gaziev; in it, the four veteran field commanders alleged that Umarov's renunciation was disrespectful to his subordinates, and while they still pledged allegiance to the Caucasus Emirate, they no longer supported him. According to Muhannad, the primary reason for the mutiny was Umarov's disobedience of the mujahideen shura council's consensus that he step down; in response, Saifullah Gubdenski - leader of the Dagestani fighters - fiercely condemned Muhannad by accusing him and his foreign predecessors of "neglecting the aspirations of local rebel leaders" and lashing out at the "outsiders' selfish desire to install their men in leading positions in traditionally parochial" Caucasian militant groups. Furthermore, the vast majority of insurgents in the republics surrounding Chechnya continued to support Umarov, at one point reaching out for external theological support via the London-based Syrian Salafi ideologue named Abd al-Mun'im Mustafa Halima (also known as Abu Basir al-Tartusi), who called on Muhannad to "either repent and obey Emir Doku Abu Osman (Dokka Umarov) or leave the [North] Caucasus and return home." Umarov himself accused Muhannad of being the "main organizer of fitna (split/discord) among the Mujahideen" in Chechnya, and asked him to re-affirm his loyalty. When Muhannad did not, Umarov allegedly relieved him of his command, leading to a very significant break within militant ranks.

== Death ==
Muhannad was killed on 21 April 2011 in a search and destroy operation carried out in forested, mountainous terrain east of the village of Serzhen-Yurt at the junction of three districts in the Chechen republic: Shali, Kurchaloi, and Vedeno. According to the press center of the Chechen Interior Ministry, the operation featured officers from several district police stations, a Spetsnaz battalion of Russian MVD “South” troops, Spetsnaz from the 2nd Patrol Regiment of the Chechen MVD, and a detachment of the “Terek” unit from the MVD of the North Caucasus Federal District (SKFO). The search team allegedly happened upon a group of six militants at 11:50 AM, who promptly split into groups of "two or three" so as to avoid capture. According to Russian officials, Muhannad and an Ingush militant named Ilyaz Sultygov ran into an ambush set by a group of commandos, and were killed in the ensuing shootout. Russian television showed footage of Muhannad's body on 22 April 2011, a common practice by Russian authorities following the successful liquidation of militant commanders.

Following his death, Russian authorities stated that Muhannad was "directly involved in virtually every suicide terrorist attack committed in the Russian Federation over the past few years," at least according to intelligence gathered from captured Chechen militants. Ramzan Kadyrov also claimed that Muhannad only weighed around 50 kilograms at the time of his death, using this as proof that the insurgency was having "serious difficulties with the supply of food" and was "on the verge of starvation." Kadyrov, however, is known for outrageous and unverifiable claims, making it worth noting that in the photograph released of Muhannad's corpse he does not appear to be much different physically than those taken over the past decade.

Muhannad's top deputy and presumed successor - an ethnic Kurd from Turkey called Abdulla Kurd - would be killed less than two weeks later, capping a momentous month for the Russian security services that included the elimination of several high-ranking Emirs in other provinces, including Supyan Abdullayev (Deputy Emir of the Caucasus Emirate), Israpil Velijanov (Emir of Vilayat Dagestan), Asker Dzhappuyev (Emir of the United Vilayat of Kabarda, Balkaria and Karachay) and several other field commanders and lesser known Emirs of smaller sectors. Muhannad's killing was of significant importance given that he was one of the most ruthless, capable and tactically proficient field commanders as well as the last prominent Arab volunteer in Chechnya; analysts called it one of Russia's most significant security successes in the region in years.

A July 2011 rapprochement by the feuding separatist factions re-aligned Gakayev, Vadalov, and numerous other field commanders who had previously forsworn their oaths of loyalty to Umarov; Muhannad's death is thought to have paved the way to reconciliation between the two sides.

== See also ==
- Abu Omar al-Saif
- Abu Zaid Al-Kuwaiti
- Mujahideen in Chechnya
