= Yassir al-Sudani =

Chechen Mujahideen commander (–2010)

Yassir al-Sudani ياسر السوداني

Personal details
- Born: Unknown
- Died: 8 June 2010; Vedeno district, Chechnya

Military service
- Allegiance: Caucasus Emirate
- Unit: Chechen Mujahideen
- Battles/wars: North Caucasus Insurgency

Yassir al-Sudani (Arabic: ياسر السوداني), (Russian: Ясир аль-Судани), also known as Yasser Youssef Amarat or Abu Yassir, was a Mujahid Emir (commander) fighting in Chechnya. Most Russian language sources report he was a Jordanian citizen.

== Rebel Activity ==
Reportedly an explosives expert who specialized in the preparation of suicide bombers, al-Sudani is said to have traveled to the Caucasus region in 2003, serving in the State Defense Committee - or Majilis al-Shura - of the Chechen Republic of Ichkeria. Following the death of Abu Hafs al-Urduni in November 2006, al-Sudani was reportedly one of the candidates to succeed him as Emir of the Arab Mujahideen in Chechnya. The appointment eventually went to the Saudi-born militant known as Muhannad, but al-Sudani became leader of a branch of the foreign volunteers that at one time had previously been commanded by al-Urduni. Al-Sudani was allegedly involved in numerous attacks on Russian federal forces as well as local law enforcement officials, and was also singled out by Chechen President Ramzan Kadyrov as - along with Muhannad - being behind a spate of suicide attacks in Chechnya in the summer of 2009.

== Death ==
Al-Sudani was killed in a special operation by Russian security forces in the mountainous Vedeno district of Chechnya on 8 June 2010. Members of the Federal Security Service (FSB), Interior Ministry (MVD), and local law enforcement officers from the Kurchaloi district had been conducting an operation in the southern mountains of Chechnya beginning on 8 May and code-named "Retribution;" its targets were allegedly Muhannad, al-Sudani and Chechen field commander Khuseyn Gakayev. Al-Sudani was among a group of Islamic radicals detected and then surrounded in a densely forested area on 8 June; following a series of clashes that lasted several hours, the bodies of eight militants were recovered. One of those slain was identified by his call-sign of "Forest Lion" and was known to be al-Sudani's top aide and someone that Ramzan Kadyrov claimed never left his side, leading to suspicion that the Sudanese commander had been among those killed. The following day an insurgent captured after the battle said that al-Sudani had been seriously wounded and shortly thereafter died; he also said that the militants had buried al-Sudani themselves, before leading Russian security forces to the site of his grave.
