= Saif al-Islam al-Masri =

Egyptian al-Qaeda member

Saif al-Islam al-Masri (Arabic: سيف الإسلام المصري) (also known as Abu Islam and Abu Islam al Masry) is the name of an Egyptian lawyer who joined Al-Qaeda, and who was active in Afghanistan, Lebanon, Somalia, Chechnya and Georgia.

The name is probably, but not certainly, a nom de guerre; Saif al-Islam means Sword of Islam and al-Masri means the Egyptian, but either or both could be a real name. Al-Masri's name has been mentioned in reports on Al-Qaeda operations during the 1990s and until 2002, when he was reportedly captured and transmitted to U.S. custody.

Saif al-Islam was a trainer at, and perhaps the Emir (leader) of, the Jihad Wal training camp near Khost, Afghanistan in 1992. He was then a member of Al-Qaeda's military committee. In 1993, on the orders of Mohammed Atef, he left from Peshawar, Pakistan to Somalia at the head of an Al-Qaeda team.

At some point in the early 1990s, according to Jamal al-Fadl, there was a meeting in the Riyadh neighbourhood of Khartoum, Sudan including Osama bin Laden (who lived nearby), a Sudanese scholar named Ahmed Abdel Rahman Hamadabi, and an Iranian scholar named Nomani, who was an emissary of his government. Al-Fadl testified that a joint orientation of Sunni and Shia Muslims toward fighting the West was discussed. According to the 9/11 Commission, discussions in Khartoum "in late 1991 or 1992" led to an agreement between Iran and Al-Qaeda to cooperate "in providing support-even if only training-for actions carried out primarily against Israel and the United States."

Subsequently, Saif al-Islam, Saif al-Adel, two other operatives known as Abu Jaffer al-Masry and Salem al-Masry (all four being definitively or impliedly Egyptian), and one Abu Talha al-Sudani were trained by Hezbollah, in Lebanon, in the use of explosives, including "how to explosives [sic.] big buildings."

Saif al-Islam was reported to have fought against American forces in Somalia, but it is not clear from sources referring specifically to the fighting in Somalia at that time that he participated in combat directly. Al-Qaida's main contributions "were in the fields of training and financing," with members also involved as "advisors on the political and strategic level." He was an addressee of some of the letters sent by Al-Qaeda leaders to "the Africa corps," i.e. Al-Qaeda activists in Somalia.

He was in Grozny, Chechnya by 1998, when he served as an officer of the Chechnya branch of the charity Benevolence International Foundation, later designated by the United States as a financier of terrorism. At the time, Grozny was the capital of the breakaway Chechen Republic of Ichkeria.

In early October 2002, or according to another report that summer, Al-Islam was one of fifteen men captured in the Pankisi Gorge, Georgia, in a joint operation by Georgian and American Special Forces. Saif al-Islam had been a member of al-Qaeda's majlis al-shura (consultative council) and its military committee. Following his arrest, the Georgian authorities reportedly handed him over to the American government. It is not clear what happened to him since.

The operation in which al-Masri was captured was one of the final acts of the Pankisi Gorge crisis.
