= Abu al-Walid =

Islamist militant

- ابو الوليد الغامدي

2nd Emir of the Arab Mujahideen in Chechnya
- In office 2002–2004
- Preceded by: Ibn al-Khattab
- Succeeded by: Abu Hafs al-Urduni

Personal details
- Born: 1967 Baljurashi, Saudi Arabia
- Died: 16 April 2004 (aged 36-37) Tsa-Vedeno, Chechnya, Russia

Military service
- Allegiance: Afghan mujahideen Azerbaijan; United Tajik Opposition; Bosnian mujahideen Chechen mujahideen
- Years of service: 1986–2004
- Battles/wars: Soviet–Afghan War; Bosnian War; Tajik Civil War; First Chechen War; Second Chechen War; Battle for Height 776

Abdulaziz bin Omar Al-Ghamdi (Arabic: عبد العزيز بن عمر الغامدي; 1967 – 16 April 2004), better known by his nom de guerre Abu al-Walid (Arabic: ابو الوليد), was a Saudi Arabian pan-Islamist militant. Although he participated in several conflicts in Central Asia and the Balkans, he is best known for his involvement in the First and Second Chechen Wars, where he was one of the most notable non-Chechen militant leaders. He was killed in April 2004 in Chechnya by Russian federal forces.

Al-Walid was one of the most prominent Arabs fighting in Chechnya. In 2002 he took over as emir (commander) of an autonomous unit, composed mostly of non-Chechen mujahideen, following the death of Ibn al-Khattab on 20 March 2002.

Abu al-Walid was accused by the Russians of terrorist attacks on civilians, and alleged to be an agent of Saudi intelligence, the Muslim Brotherhood, or Bin Laden's al-Qaeda. He never responded or admitted to any of the accusations, but condemned abuses by Russian forces in Chechnya.

== Identity ==
Al-Walid was a very elusive figure in contrast to his predecessor, Ibn al-Khattab, who had a personal camera crew of two who followed him into combat. Speculation arose about al-Walid's identity, whereabouts and actions, and occasionally there were rumours of his death. A persistent rumour was that he had drowned in June 2002, carried off on his horse after trying to ford a river. Russian officials announced his death at least seven times. At one point, even his very existence was deemed doubtful.

On 23 June 2002, his family gave an interview to the Saudi newspaper Al-Watan, telling much about his background. They confirmed that his full given name was Abdul Aziz Bin Ali Bin Said Al Said Al-Ghamdi (Arabic: أبو الوليد عبد العزيز بن سعيد بن علي الغامدي).

== Biography ==
=== Early life ===
A member of the Ghamd tribe in Saudi Arabia, al-Walid was raised in the village of al-Hal, near the city of Baljorashi in Saudi Arabia's Al Bahah Province. In his native village, his father was a well known imam. He was born into a large family as one of eleven sons. His brothers claimed that in his youth, al-Walid had enjoyed acting, reading religious books and studying the Quran.

=== Militant career ===
In 1986, when he was 19 years old, al-Walid obtained his parents' permission to participate in jihad in Afghanistan. He soon left for the country to join the mujahideen in their fight against the Russian forces during the Soviet–Afghan War. The next two years he spent training at the Maktab al-Khidamat, an organization created by Abdullah Azzam and Osama bin Laden. They trained the international volunteers and distributed funds to Islamic groups. Upon completing his training, al-Walid was assigned to a combat unit where he started fighting. On two occasions he briefly returned to Saudi Arabia, once to have an injury to his left hand treated.

After the end of the Soviet–Afghan War, al-Walid went on to fight in other conflicts in Europe and Asia. In the 1990s, the movement would lead him to the Balkans, specifically to Bosnia where he fought alongside the Bosniaks in the Bosnian War; he then travelled to Tajikistan, where he assisted the Islamist rebels in the Tajikistani Civil War; and eventually to Chechnya, where he joined the Chechen mujahideen. This group had been organized by and was being led by Ibn al-Khattab.

=== First Chechen War ===
In the First Chechen War, al-Walid was a Naib (deputy) in Khattab's unit. He participated in the numerous raids and ambushes that were executed by the IIB, including the April 1996 Shatoy ambush, in which they attacked and destroyed a large Russian armoured column.

=== Interwar period and Dagestan War ===
After the war, he remained in Chechnya along with most of the battalion It concentrated on setting up a network of camps in the mountainous South of the country, in which they trained Islamist rebels from throughout the region, and recruits from abroad.

On 22 December 1997 al-Walid participated in a surprise attack on the base of the 136th Armoured Brigade of the Russian Army, stationed in Buynaksk, Dagestan. This raid contributed to the growing tensions between Moscow and the newly formed government of the Chechen Republic of Ichkeria.

In 1999 he participated in the Islamic International Peacekeeping Brigade’s invasion of Dagestan, which helped catalyze the Second Chechen War. During this conflict, Khattab's first deputy Hakim al-Medani was killed. Analysts believe that after al-Medani's death, al-Walid was promoted to the position of first deputy. Before the events of 1999 in Dagestan, al-Walid was a relatively unknown figure outside of Chechnya.

After his incursion, his notoriety began to rise in Islamist circles abroad.

=== Second Chechen War ===
In the Second Chechen War, al-Walid continued as Khattab's deputy to participate in raids and ambushes. In the spring of 2000, he achieved his most important military victories. On 29 February, he led the Battle of Ulus-Kert. His forces engaged and surrounded an entire company of the VDV 76th Guards Air Assault Division from Pskov. The battle lasted for several days and eventually resulted in the total annihilation of the Russian company. The separatist news agency Chechenpress reported that only 12 Chechen rebels had been killed in the battle, while Russian sources estimated their losses at up to 300 men. In April 2000, al-Walid successfully attacked the VDV 51st Guards Parachute Landing Regiment from Tula.

In the summer of 2001, the late Aslan Maskhadov, then president of the Chechen Republic of Ichkeria, appointed Abu al-Walid commander of the Eastern front.

After Khattab's death on 20 March 2002, al-Walid assumed command of the IIB. Soon afterwards he released an article through the foreign Mujahideen's official website al-Qoqaz, in which he explained the circumstances surrounding Khattab's death. The release of this article also confirmed that he had taken command of the IIB. Later he also issued a video-statement, in which he commented on the death of his predecessor.

On 9 April 2002, al-Walid announced that his forces had shot down the Mil Mi-24 'Hind' gunship and taken its three-man crew prisoner. It had been reported missing for two months. He released the serial number of the helicopter and detailed information about the crew members. On 16 May he issued an ultimatum to the Russian military authorities: threatening to kill the three prisoners if the Russians failed to release 20 Chechens being held in Russian prisons. The Russians did not comply. The online Chechen Islamist news agency, Kavkaz Center, claimed it has unconfirmed information that the crew had been executed.

=== Death ===
Al-Walid was killed by members of Sulim Yamadaev's Special Battalion "Vostok" (East) in Chechnya on 16 April 2004. Although there are several versions of the circumstances, the most extensive account is derived from a letter written by Abu Hafs al-Urduni, who assumed command of the Chechen Mujahideen. He said that al-Walid was "on tour to all regiments of the mujahideen to task them with operations and logistical plans." Members of his party were captured in the village of Tsa-Vedeno, and pro-Moscow security forces determined "his position in a nearby forest".

After heavy bombardment of the area, snipers ambushed and killed al-Walid. Abu al-Walid's brother Ali Al Ghamdi said that Abu al-Walid was ambushed and shot by the Russian Special Forces in the forest near the village of Tsa-Vedeno. Ali said that Abu al-walid's companions were able to hide his body from the Russian forces in the forest then buried him later. He also said that the information about Abu Al-Walid's being betrayed were wrong and that his brother was shot in a fight with the Russian forces. Abu al-Walid's will was not to be filmed after his death. Vladimir Putin rewarded Yamadaev as a Hero of the Russian Federation at the Kremlin in the summer of 2005.

== Allegations of terrorism ==
Russian authorities often accused Khattab, al-Walid and other Arabs fighting in Chechnya, of involvement in terrorism. According to the FSB, Al-Walid was responsible for several terrorist attacks, including the 1999 apartment bombings, the 2002 Kaspiysk bombing, and planned but never executed bacteriological attacks on Russia. He and Shamil Basayev were also accused of organizing the suicide-bombing of the Chechen Republic's Government headquarters in Grozny on 27 December 2002.

Only Basayev claimed responsibility for the latter attack, but Russian officials asserted that the "Arab methods" suggested that it was done by "Arab militants trained in Afghanistan". Al-Walid has been accused of being an agent of al-Qaeda, the Muslim Brotherhood, and Saudi Intelligence. He never responded to such allegations, and never claimed responsibility for any of these terrorist attacks. He never admitted to being a member of al-Qaeda, the Muslim Brotherhood, or Saudi Intelligence.

Al-Walid did comment on other acts of terrorism. On 11 June 2003, the London-based Arabic newspaper Asharq Al-Awsat reported on a statement he had released through the al-Qoqaz News Agency. He encouraged the Iraqi insurgents to carry out suicide operations. He said, "According to [my] experience in the Caucasus, such operations will have an effect on American and British troops".

Abu al-Walid issuing a video statement on Al Jazeera Arabic

On 19 November 2003, Al-Jazeera broadcast a video statement in which al-Walid commented on suicide bombings by Chechen women; he claimed the attacks were motivated by fear of rape and brutality by Russian soldiers:

These women, particularly the wives of the Mujahideen who were martyred, are being threatened in their homes, their honour and everything are being threatened. They do not accept being humiliated and living under occupation. They say that they want to serve the cause of Almighty God and avenge the death of their husbands and persecuted people.

On 13 March 2004, one day before the Russian presidential election, al-Walid released another video statement broadcast by Al-Jazeera. He commented on the Russian strategy of dropping mines in the forested areas from which the Chechen insurgents are carrying out their guerrilla war against the Russian army and their Chechen collaborators:

The enemies of God drop mines in the forests and God willing, we will return them to the Russians and they will find them on their land and in the midst of their families. (…) But perhaps we may wait a little to see the upcoming elections. If they elect someone who declares war on Chechnya, then the Russians are declaring war against the Chechens and by God we will send them these [mines]... Not only these but also things that did not cross their minds. (…) We will return these to you [Russians]… You will, God willing, see hundreds of people crippled.

== See also ==
- Abu Zaid Al-Kuwaiti
