= Yarysh-mardy =

Village in Shatoysky District, Russia

Coordinates: 42°58′46″N 45°42′44″E

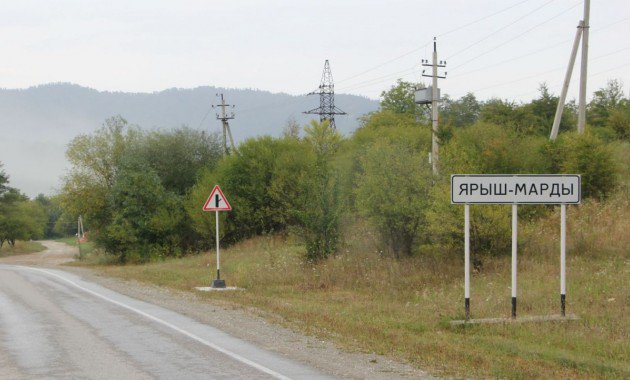
Village of Yarysh-Mardy

Yarysh-mardy (Russian: Ярыш-Марды; Chechen: Ярашмаьрда, Yaraşmärda) is a rural locality (a selo) in Shatoysky District in Chechnya.

== Geography ==
The village is located on the right bank of the Argun river, 36 kilometers south of Grozny and 27 kilometers southeast of Urus-Martan.

The nearest settlements are Chishki in the north-west, Dachu-Borzoy in the north-east and Ulus-Kert in the east.

== History ==
The village of Yarysh-Mardy was founded in 1870.

In 1944, after the deportation of the Chechens and Ingush and the abolition of the Checheno-Ingush ASSR, the village of Yarysh-Mardy was renamed to Alabaster and settled by people from neighbouring Dagestan.

In 1977, the village was renamed back to Yarysh-Mardy.

During the first Chechen war in April 1996, the infamous Shatoy ambush took place when Chechen fighters, led by Khattab, ambushed and wrecked a Russian army column.

On January 1, 2020, the village was transferred from the Groznensky District to the Shatoysky District.

== Population ==
- 1990 Census: 277
- 2002 Census: 0
- 2010 Census: 49
- 2012 Census: 54
- 2014 Census: 60
- 2022 Census: 71
