= Al-Sudani =

Al-Sudani may refer to:

- Al-Sudani (newspaper), Arabic newspaper in Khartoum, Sudan
- Al-Sudani, a surname; notable people with the name include:
  - Abdel Falah al-Sudani, Iraqi politician
  - Bilal al-Sudani, (? - 2023), ISIS and Al Shabaab leader in Somalia
  - Harith al-Sudani (?-2017), Iraqi spy against ISIS
  - Mohammed Shia' Al Sudani, Iraqi politician
  - Yassir al-Sudani, military commander from Chechnya

== See also ==
- Sudanese (disambiguation)
