= Displacement of Dagestanis during the war in Dagestan =

- Part of War in Dagestan
- Map of Dagestan
- Location: Dagestan
- Date: 1999
- Target: Dagestani people
- Attack type: Displacement
- Victim: 18,000 to 32,000
- Perpetrator: Islamic Peacekeeping Brigade

Displacement during the 1999 war in Dagestan refers to the displacement of civilians during the 1999 war in Dagestan by the Islamic International Peacekeeping Brigade.

== Background ==
In 1999, Chechen Forces invaded Dagestan in hope to capture it to create a united nation of both countries. During the invasion reports came that Chechen Forces forced Avar residents out of their villages and beat them. After the war was over the total of the displaced people from Dagestan was between 18,000 and 32,000.
