= 2004 raid on Avtury =

2004 battle in the Second Chechen War

Raid on Avtury
- Part of Second Chechen War
Date	July 12–13, 2004
Location	Avtury, Chechnya
Result	Major Chechen victory

Belligerents
Russia: Chechnya	Chechen Republic of Ichkeria; Arab Mujahideen

Commanders and leaders
Unknown	(Chechen Republic of Ichkeria) Suleiman Elmurzayev; Abu Hafs al-Urduni

Strength
Unknown	25 to 150 (possibly 60–70)

Casualties and losses
At least 18–22 killed and 12 captured Rebels claimed 45–50+ killed	At least 5 killed, 11 injured and 2 missing Federals claimed 15–20+ killed
- 2 civilians injured

The raid on Avtury took place on 12–13 July 2004, when a large group of Chechen militants assaulted the Chechen village of Avtury.

== Attack ==
After entering the village, separatist guerillas first blocked all entrances to the village and then attacked and seized the buildings of the security forces, inflicting heavy casualties on the defenders. A dozen members of pro-Moscow Chechen police and militia forces who had run out of ammunition were captured at dawn in their base. A car was also ambushed on the road to Avtury and all its passengers were killed.

As the rebels retreated and the government reinforcements arrived, the fighting reportedly continued in the forest outside the village later on the second day.

According to the government sources, at least 18 pro-Moscow fighters and 15 rebels died in the village (20 according to Ramzan Kadyrov). Initially it was claimed eight rebels were killed, and only one body was found at the site according to Memorial. The government declined to disclose the republican and federal losses during the fighting outside of Avtury.

The separatists said they lost five men killed and two missing, while the Russian losses were estimated as at least 45 to 50 killed (including 15-20 commandos during a fight in the forest near Avtury) and dozens wounded.

== See also ==
- 2004 Nazran raid
- 2004 Grozny raid
