= Abu Hafs al-Urduni =

Mujahid commander (1973–2006)

Abu Hafs Al-Urduni
- أبو حفص الأردني

3rd Emir of the Arab Mujahideen in Chechnya
- In office 2004–2006
- Preceded by: Abu al-Walid
- Succeeded by: Muhannad

Personal details
- Born: 1973 Zarqa, Jordan
- Died: 26 November 2006 (aged 33) Khasav-Yurt, Dagestan, Russia

Military service
- Years of service: 1980s–2006
- Battles/wars: Soviet–Afghan War; Tajik Civil War; First Chechen War; Second Chechen War

Abu Hafs al-Urduni (Arabic: أبو حفص الأردني; 1973 – November 26, 2006), also transliterated as Abu Hafs al-Urdani, was a Jordanian militant fighting in Chechnya. He was killed in Dagestan on November 26, 2006.

== Biography ==
=== Early life ===
Most of whatever little is known about al-Urduni, is known through the Russian media. It is however fairly certain that his given name is Farid Yusef Umeira, that he was born in Zarqa, Jordan and that he participated in the Soviet–Afghan War, the Bosnian War, and the Tajik civil war along with Khattab and al-Walid. With the latter two he came to Chechnya in 1995 where he would remain until his death.

=== Chechen Wars ===
In the First and Second Chechen War he fought in the battalion of Chechen Mujahideen under Khattab and, after Khattab's death, as al-Walid's deputy. After al-Walid's death in 2004, al-Urduni succeeded him as Amir of the battalion and issued a video statement about al-Walid's death, much the same way as al-Walid had done with his own predecessor, Khattab. As commander of the Arab Mujahideen in Chechnya, al-Urduni faced increasingly harsh conditions for himself and his unit of foreign fighters.

He likely took shelter in the Pankisi Gorge during the 2002 diplomatic crisis centred there. A man identified as "Abu Hafsi" with links to Al-Qaeda was reported to have escaped across the border to Chechnya before being apprehended. He was said to have been involved in both financial operations and the construction of a medical facility for fighters in the Gorge.

Apart from the loss of their most prominent commanders and the relentless hunt for separatists by the Russian Federal Forces, funding for the battalion had also become a major problem due to anti-terrorism measures restricting financial transactions. Abu Hafs orchestrated and launched the 2004 Avtury raid and the 2006 Avtury ambush on Russian forces in Avtury, Chechnya. Videos of the ambushes were made and now circulate the internet.

=== Alleged links to al-Qaeda ===
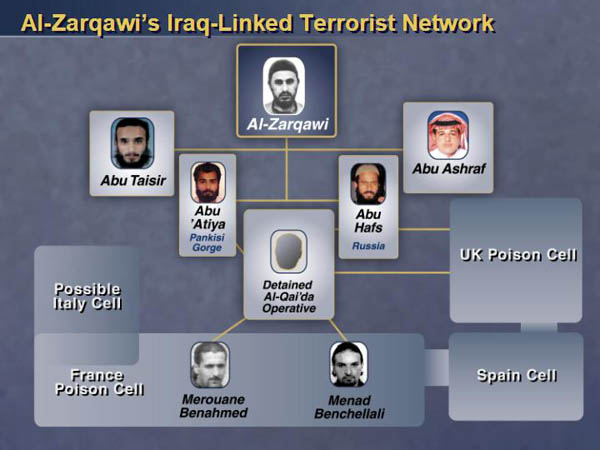
Colin Powell's 2003 UN presentation slide showing Abu Hafs and others as part of the al-Zarqawi's global terrorist network. (Subsequently, shown to be an incorrect allegation.)

Abu Hafs has been said to have connections to Al-Qaeda, although it is not clear if he was ever a member. Russian intelligence sources and media have repeatedly accused him of being al-Qaeda's emissary in the Caucasus. His name is also found in a presentation of Colin Powell, then U.S. Secretary of State at the Security Council in February 2003 just before the Iraq War, where al-Urduni was stated to be part of a supposed international network headed by Abu Musab al-Zarqawi. Al-Zarqawi later pledged allegiance to Al-Qaeda's Osama Bin Laden, but in 2002-2003 was not a member. Al-Zarqawi led his own organisation, Jama'at al-Tawhid wal-Jihad.

In an interview with Kavkaz Center, al-Urduni once expressed his sympathy with al-Qaeda and Osama bin Laden, although he did not admit to being part of the organization. On a different occasion he condemned the Beslan hostage crisis and denied personal involvement. Whether or not he was an agent of al-Qaeda or if there are, or have been, any formal ties between the Arab Mujahideen in Chechnya and al-Qaeda remains unclear.

=== Death ===
November 26, 2006, Abu Hafs al-Urduni was killed in a gunfight with Russian special forces in Khasav-Yurt, Dagestan. Russian sources claim the fire fight lasted for four hours, and that four other rebels were killed in the encounter. The Kavkaz Center later confirmed al-Urduni's death, but claims only two other rebels were killed in the fighting. December 9, 2006, Qoqaz News, the Chechen Mujahideen online news agency, reported that Muhannad had succeeded al-Urduni as commander of the Arab Mujahideen in Chechnya.

== See also ==
- Abu Omar al-Saif
- Abu Zaid Al-Kuwaiti
- Dagestan War
- Mujahideen in Chechnya
