= Mozdok truck bombing =

Chechen separatist suicide bombing in a Russian military hospital

- Mozdok (Russia)
- Location: Mozdok, Mozdoksky District, Russia
- Date: 1 August 2003 around 19:00 (MSK)
- Target: Military personnel, hospital staff
- Attack type: Suicide bombing
- Weapon: Truck bombs
- Deaths: 52 - 60
- Injuries: 82
- Perpetrators: Abu Omar al-Kuwaiti (Al-Qaeda), Magomed Dadaev (the suicide bomber), Magomed Kodzoev
- Motive: Islamic extremism, Chechen independence

The Mozdok truck bombing occurred on 1 August 2003, when Chechen militants detonated a truck bomb at the military hospital in Mozdok.

== Background ==
Mozdok contains one of Russia's most important military bases in the Caucasus. It has been used since the First Chechen War.

Two different terrorist attacks were planned in Mozdok. However, the first attack, which was to be carried out by Zarema Muzhikhoeva, failed due to her falling ill and her car breaking down. She later attempted a suicide attack at a restaurant in the Tverskoy of Moscow, but the bomb failed to detonate, killing no one except a FSB bomb disposal expert. The Mozdok bombing was the second attack, which succeeded.

Russian authorities claimed that Abu Zaid Al-Kuwaiti was responsible for organizing the terrorist attack, including instructing the suicide bomber, Magomed Dadaev, with his role in the Beslan school attack being described in the same way. However, it was later found out that his role in the Beslan attack was greatly exaggerated.

== Attack ==
The suicide bomber was Magomed Dadaev.

The blast occurred at about 19:00 MSK on 1 August 2003 when a KamAZ truck loaded with 10 tons of ammonium nitrate, roughly equivalent to one and a half tons of TNT, crashed into the hospital building at maximum speed, which destroyed it. Additionally, several nearby buildings were damaged, including a cardboard factory that had its wall collapsed and a tent camp that was flattened. The attack was the eighth in Russia over a span of three months at the time of the incident.

== Reactions ==
=== Domestic ===
Vladimir Putin, the president of Russia, was immediately informed of the attack as it happened. Upon his request, a plane with rescuers and emergency equipment was sent to the city. Shortly after, he sent the at-the-time defense minister Sergei Ivanov. The Kremlin said that Putin had sent condolences to victims’ families. Putin reportedly demanded an explanation of how rebels managed to enter the area, leading to speculation that the guards may have been bribed by the suicide bomber.

The Russian government blamed the head of the Mozdosk hospital garrison and fired him, leading to backlash from the hospital staff.

“We have to admit… criminals are continuing to exploit weak points in the defences of military bases.”

— Deputy General Prosecutor Sergei Fridinsky

=== International ===
- Amnesty International: Amnesty issued a statement on 9 December 2003, calling the recent bomb attacks in Russia 'indiscriminate' and a 'flagrant disrespect for civilian life'.
- USA: In an official press release, the United States press secretary sent condolences to the families of the victims, labeled the attack as terrorism, and condemned it.
- Turkey: In an official press release, Turkey expressed sorrow over the loss of lives and injuries, condemned the attack as terrorism, and reaffirmed its opposition to all forms of terrorism. Turkey also extended condolences to the victims' families and wished a quick recovery to the wounded.

== Aftermath ==
As a result of the attack, the duty officer of the North Ossetian Ministry of Emergency Situations stated that the building was completely destroyed by the explosion and a huge crater was formed in its place. Windows near the incident were broken. According to the correspondent of the Vesti program, there were 115 people (military personnel and hospital staff) in the hospital at the time of the attack.

The head of the Mozdok hospital garrison was arrested. This decision was met with criticism from the hospital staff.

A new military hospital was shortly announced to be constructed. The families of those killed in Mozdok received 100 thousand rubles each, around $5006 USD at the time. Civilian victims received 50 thousand rubles each.

A day of mourning was declared in North Ossetia, Russia. It was also announced that a marble slab with the names of the victims will be placed at the site of the attack.

== Controversies ==
=== Russian soldier bribing allegations ===
Several Russian newspapers, according to Al Jazeera, claimed that the suicide bomber, Magomed Dadaev, bribed Russian guards to get past the multiple military checkpoints present in the area.

=== Suspension and subsequent arrest of Artur Arakelyan ===
The head of the Mozdok hospital garrison, who was also the commander of the 429th Motorized Rifle Regiment, Lieutenant Colonel Artur Arakelyan was initially relieved of his duties and then detained on 2 August 2001 by the North Caucasus Military District of the Russian Armed Forces, due to having a 'negligent attitude' to the orders presented to him. The doctors of the hospital publicly denounced this decision.
