= 2006 Avtury ambush =

2006 battle in Chechnya, Russia

Avtury ambush
- Part of Second Chechen War
Date	July 4, 2006
Location	Near Avtury, Chechnya
Result	Rebel victory

Belligerents
(Russia) GRU	Chechen separatists Caucasian Front

Commanders and leaders
?	Abu Hafs al-Urduni; Isa Muskiyev

Casualties and losses
Officially 6–7 killed and 12–20 wounded Rebels claimed 20 killed and 30 wounded	Officially none

Avtury GRU ambush was the July 4, 2006 ambush in Chechnya.

== The attack ==
15-20 Chechen rebel fighters led by Abu Hafs al-Urduni and armed with heavy machine guns, assault rifles, grenade launchers and rocket-propelled grenades opened fire from a forested area in Avtury on a motorized column of the GRU Spetsnaz 16th Brigade from Tambov, composed of several military trucks and one armored personnel carrier.

The attack, which lasted for about an hour, completely destroyed the motorized column, killed between 7 and 30 Russian soldiers, and wounded as many as 30 others; effectively stopping the flow of reinforcements and weapons to Russian troops in Avtury Chechnya, according to Russian sources. Separatist websites announced the attack was a "meticulously planned act of revenge" by Commanders Abu Hafs al-Urduni and Abu Yassir for the death of the Chechen rebel leader Abdul-Halim Sadulayev. They said the Russians lost "close to 40" men and that they themselves suffered no casualties. A video of the attack which circulates on the internet was made giving a tribute to Abdul-Halim Sadulayev and then showing the planning and execution of the attack.

On the same day, Russian president Vladimir Putin said the term "combat operations" can no longer be used with regards to Chechnya: "There are outbursts of terrorist actions, but no combat actions in Chechnya," Putin said.
