= Sudanese (disambiguation) =

Sudanese or Sudanic may refer to:

- pertaining to the country of Sudan
  - the people of Sudan, see Demographics of Sudan
- pertaining to Sudan (region)
  - Sudanic languages
  - Sudanic race, subtype of the Africoid racial category

== See also ==
- Al-Sudani (disambiguation)
- Sudanese Civil War (disambiguation)
