= Konstantin Kochiev =

South Ossetian politician

Advisor to the President of South Ossetia
- Incumbent
- Assumed office 2022

State Councilor of the President of South Ossetia
- In office 2012–2022

Konstantin Kochiev is an Ossetian diplomat and politician from the partially recognized Caucasian Republic of South Ossetia, which most of the United Nations recognizes as part of Georgia, occupied by Russia.

== Biography ==
During the Pankisi Gorge crisis in 2002, the Georgian government considered expanding their security region to include South Ossetia, claiming the breakaway territory's security forces were inadequate at protecting its residents. Kochiev represented South Osseita in talks against this, which the Georgian government agreed to, stating there was no way to include South Ossetia into the security zone without a clash and armed conflict with the separatist government with Kochiev instead suggesting police reform within South Ossetia to stabilize the situation.

In 2005 Kochiev was the South Ossetian representative from the Moscow-based "Forum on Democracy and Multiculturalism in the Euro-East" which saw representatives from South Ossetia, Abkhazia, Artsakh and Transnistria (Note: as well as other smaller groups, such as the "Samegrelo" movement, which seeks an independent state for Mingrelians, and several Russophile Georgian political parties, such as the Georgian Labour Party and the Justice Party of Georgia) which denounced the United States, praised Serbia denouncing Kosovo, and called on Russia to invade and annex Georgia. The Forum also denounced the territorial integrity of Georgia as a Soros-backed conspiracy, claimed Moldova was perpetrating a genocide, and that Ukraine's orange revolution was a threat to global democracy.

In 2010 Kochiev went on a state visit to the Western Sahara, returning stating that the Sahrawi Arab Democratic Republic's Polisario Front has recognized South Ossetia's independence, and that he had made inroads with the Algerian government. In 2015 Kochiev served as State Counsellor to the President of the Republic during the Presidency of Leonid Tibilov. In 2016 Kochiev was on a committee tasked with drafting a new Constitution, alongside Zhanna Zasseeva, Merab Chigoev, Peter Gatikoev, Stanislav Kochiev, Alan Parastaev, and Ilona Khubaeva.

In 2017 Kochiev served as State Councilor of the President of the Republic of South Ossetia during the tenure of Anatoliy Bibilov, and received the Order of Friendship in a celebration of the 25th anniversary of the creation of the Ministry of foreign affairs. He received the award alongside other veterans of the ministry, including; Dmitiy Medoev, the first minister of foreign affairs, Andrey Tskhovrebov, the first deputy minister of foreign affairs, Murat Dzhioev, one of the leading negotiators following the 1991 war, Zaira Valieva, the incumbent Secretariat of the Ministry of Foreign Affairs, Akhsar Dzhioev, the longtime ambassador of South Ossetia to Russia, Alan Pliev, another deputy foreign minister, Sergey Surago, the South Ossetian, the South Ossetian diplomat to Transnistria, and Inga Kochieva, Madina Valieva, Zarina Kochieva, Emma Tibilova, and Irina Tskhovrebova, all counselors in the ministry.

Kochiev is currently serving in the administration of Alan Gagloev as "Advisor to the President." As which, on June 14, 2022, Kochiev held consultations with the Russian government over annexation. The delegation claimed that the USD$500,000 price tag to hold the referendum was the main reason that it hasn't happened yet.

In 2023 Kochiev was the South Ossetian representative to the 59th round of the Geneva International Discussions. Kochiev voiced his support for the Geneva platform ahead of the talks in January 2024, however, also used it as a platform to call for an internationally recognized hard border within Georgia, a so-called "state border" between Georgia and South Ossetia, as well as claiming that Georgia is building its military up with "foreign partners" and such an act was a risk to the South Ossetian "state."
