= Khattabka =

Homemade Chechen hand grenade

Khattabka (Russian: хаттабка) is a popular Russian and Chechen name for a homemade hand grenade. It was dubbed so after Ibn Al-Khattab and used by various North Caucasus rebels.

They are commonly manufactured from cartridges VOG-17 and VOG-17M for AGS-17 grenade launcher of Soviet design supplied with standard grenade fuses (Russian: УЗРГМ, also Soviet design).

Bulgarian weapon manufacturer Arcus produces AR-ROG hand grenades of similar design.
