= Daro Sulakauri =

Georgian photographer (born 1985)

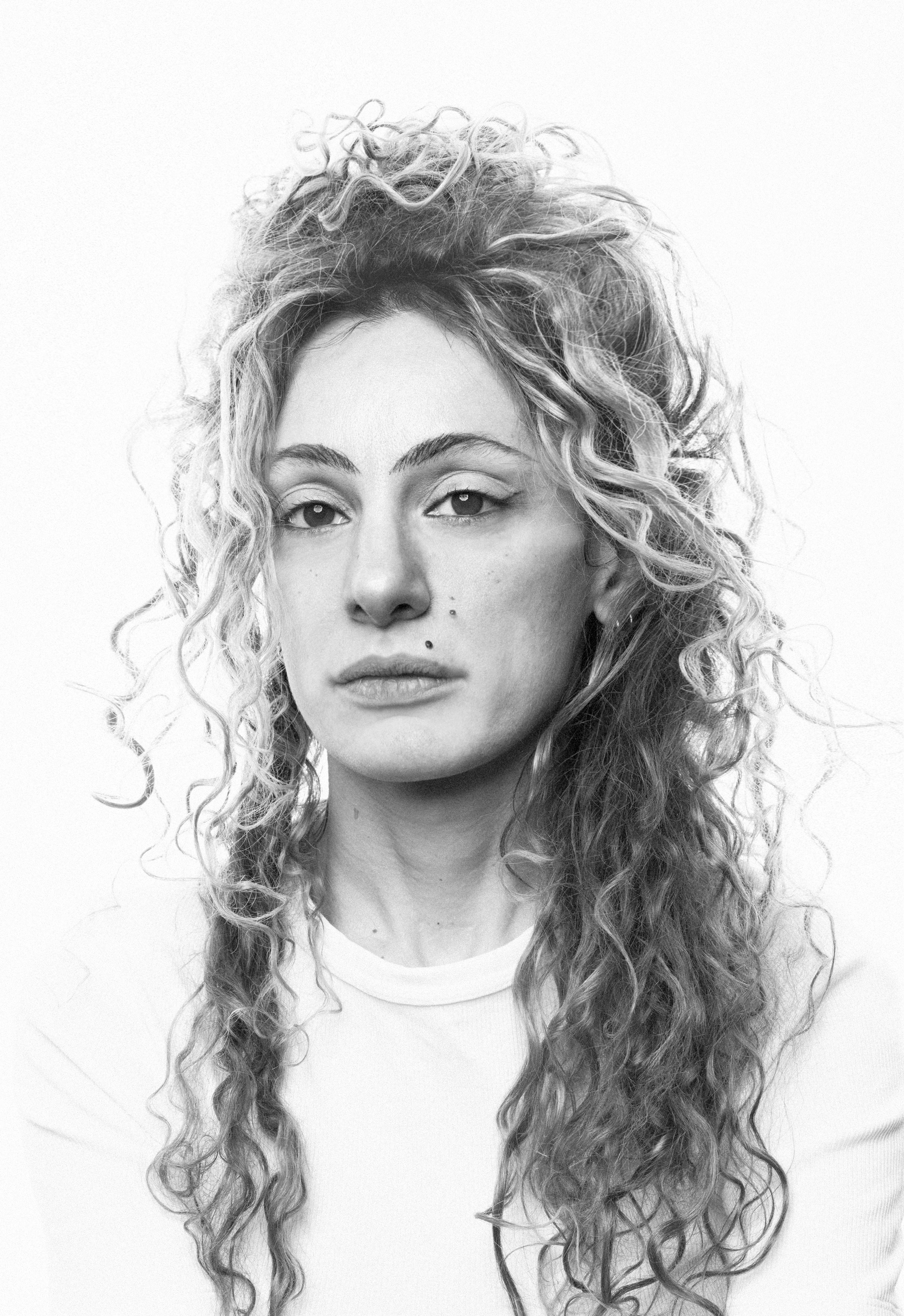
- Sulakauri in 2023
- Born: 23 April 1988 (age 38); Georgia
- Education: Tbilisi State University
- Occupation: Photojournalist
- Website: darosulakauri.com

Daro Sulakauri (Georgian, born April 23, 1988) is an investigative photojournalist. She was born in Tbilisi into a family of artists. Her work explores the complex social and political realities of the Caucasus. Sulakauri is particularly known for her documentation of Chechen refugees in the Pankisi Gorge and her investigative reporting on the stolen babies of Georgia. She is the first Georgian to receive TED Fellowship.

== Early life and education ==
Sulakauri was born in Georgia but left for the United States when she was nine. Returning to Georgia, she obtained a degree in cinematography from the Tbilisi State University before moving to New York City to study documentary photography and photojournalism at the International Center of Photography (ICP) in Manhattan, receiving a John & Marie Phillips Scholarship and an ICP Director's Fund Scholarship.

== Career and Impact ==
After completing her studies in the United States, she returned to Georgia and went to the Pankisi Gorge to document an outpost of refugees who had crossed to Georgia from Chechnya and were living in relative isolation. Her work there, called Terror Incognita, earned her second place in the 2009 Magnum Foundation's Young Photographer in the Caucasus award. Using mixed media with a documentary approach, her more recent work has chronicled social and political issues in the Caucasus, focusing on child marriage in Georgia and the impact of Russian occupation of Georgian territory.

Her work "Inside the Lives of Georgia’s Child Brides" on child marriage in Georgia played a pivotal role in bringing the issue into public consciousness for the first time. The project sparked national conversation, contributed to a broader awareness campaign, and was instrumental in influencing a legal shift—leading to the Georgian government raising the legal age of marriage. For this work, she received both the LensCulture Visual Storytelling Award and the European Union prize for journalism.

Daro's name was listed in Lens Culture "21 Great Female photographers", as well as one of the Photo District News "30 New and Emerging Photographers" in 2011. She received an Open Society Foundations Documentary Photography Project grant in 2012. And won first prize for Human Rights House Foundation. In 2017 she was an alumnus of the World Press Photo Joop Swart Masterclass. She was a Reuters Photojournalism grantee in 2018, in which year she also became a Canon ambassador. In 2022 Sulakauri became Catchlight Global Fellow, and in 2024, she became the first Georgian TED Fellow, joining a global network of change-makers. In 2025, she joined the VII Foundation Mentor Program.

Her storytelling extends to the screen with her role as the screenwriter and main protagonist for the documentary film Double Aliens, about Georgians and Armenians living together in suppressed hostility.

Sulakauri is also the creator of shifting-borders.com, an online multimedia platform that explores the personal stories of those living near the occupied territories of South Ossetia in Georgia. The project combines photography, video, and handwritten letters to document the daily realities of individuals and families affected by shifting borders and ongoing geopolitical tensions. Presented in English, Georgian, and Russian, the platform serves as a living archive and a space for local voices often excluded from mainstream narratives. By focusing on personal testimony, Shifting Borders seeks to humanize the consequences of occupation and engage audiences beyond traditional political discourse. The project has been used as an educational and advocacy tool both in Georgia and internationally.

Work by Sulakauri can be seen in the National Geographic magazine, the New York Times, Reuters, Der Spiegel, Die Zeit, Stern Crime Magazine, Mother Jones, The Economist, Geo magazine, Forbes, among others.

== Personal life ==
Daro has a son.

== Awards ==
- 2025: François Demulder Grant Winner, Visa Pour L’image Perpignan, France
- 2024: Ted Fellow
- 2024: Winner of Kolga Tbilisi Photo Festival
- 2022: Catchlight Global Fellow
- 2018: Winner of Reuters Photojournalism grant
- 2016: Winner of EU Prize for Journalism
- 2015: Winner in LensCulture Visual Storytelling Awards
- 2015: Winner of Human Right House in London
- 2009: Young Photographer in the Caucasus Award by Magnum Photos
- 2006 John & Marie Phillips Scholarship, New York City, US
- 2006 ICP Director's Fund Scholarship, New York City, US

== Books ==
- I was dreaming when I wrote this Self published; Handmade book by Daro Sulakauri, 2021 - 170 pages.
