= Abu Omar al-Saif =

Saudi militant (1970–2005)

Abu Omar al-Saif (Arabic: أبو عمر السيف)(1968/69-2005) was an informal name or nom de guerre of a Saudi Islamist and fighter operating first in Afghanistan (1986–1988) and later in the North Caucasus (1996–2005) as the mufti of Arab fighters in Chechnya, allegedly with close ties to al-Qaeda. His full name was Muhammad bin Abdullah bin Saif al-Buainain (محمد بن عبد الله بن سيف البوعينين). He sometimes also used the name, or was addressed as, al-Jaber. He was born in 1968 or 1969 in Saudi Arabia, and was killed in Dagestan in December 2005.

== Biography ==
Al-Saif seems to have been the trustee of Arab financiers, receiving money from them through some institution in Dagestan (likely the Makhachkala office of Benevolence International Foundation, a KSA-based Islamic charity, now banned) and distributing it to the Islamic insurgent forces across southern Russia. His predecessor in this role was Ibn al-Khattab, who was also a Saudi and was also killed in Dagestan.

Abu Omar al-Saif was known to a small extent as an ideologue and spiritual leader. In the Chechen government of Zelimkhan Yandarbiev in 1996, he held the title of chairman of the Sharia judges and was responsible for implementation of the Islamic courts in the republic. He also wrote several articles and books, especially related to the issues of Iraq and democracy which he considered un-Islamic and idolatrous, and the conflict in the Caucasus which he believed could only be solved through armed Islamic Jihad.
