= Shatoy ambush =

1996 ambush in Chechnya

- Part of First Chechen War
Date	16 April 1996
Location	Yarysh-mardy, Chechnya
Result	Chechen victory

Belligerents
Russia	Chechen Republic of Ichkeria

Commanders and leaders
Pyotr Terzovets †	Ruslan Gelayev; Ibn al-Khattab

Units involved
245th Motor Rifle Regiment (of the 47th Guards Tank Division): 2nd Battalion	Detachment led by Gelayev & Khattab

Strength
100–200 Russian troops	43–100 Chechen fighters

Casualties and losses
100–187 killed 8–12 soldiers escaped 27/30–50 military vehicles destroyed	3 killed, 6 wounded

The Shatoy ambush (known in Russia as the Battle of Yarysh-mardy) was a significant event during the First Chechen War. It occurred near the town of Shatoy, located in the southern mountains of Chechnya. Chechen insurgents under the leadership of their Arab-born commander, Ibn al-Khattab, would launch an attack on a large Russian Armed Forces army convoy resulting in a three hour long battle.

The Chechen rebels would succeed in destroying nearly all the vehicles within the convoy, inflicting severe and heavy losses on the Russian troops. The battle signified a major shift in Chechen defensive tactics and marked one of the most debilitating and humiliating defeats suffered by the Russian military during the war.

== Battle ==
The attack wrecked the column of the Russian 2nd Battalion from the 245th Motor Rifle Regiment (MRR) and killed 53 servicemen and injured 52, according to the official Russian figures. The first reports by the officials spoke of only 26 killed and 51 wounded. According to the other sources, up to a 100 to over a 100 to even up to 187 soldiers of the 245th MRR died in the ambush. A few civilians who were travelling with the convoy were also reportedly killed.

According to the second-hand account by the Polish journalist Mirosław Kuleba (aka Władysław Wilk/Mehmed Borz), Khattab's detachment of 43 men chose a "perfect ambush spot" with a ravine and a stream on one side and a forested slope on the other side of a serpentine mountain road: the rebels first let the Russian recon squad through and then detonated an IED under the leading tank; simultaneously, a volley of RPGs hit the unit's command vehicle, killing the Russian commander instantly, and the APC at the end the column - after this, the Chechens opened heavy machine gun fire on the rest of the Russian unit. Kuleba wrote that the three-hour attack burned 27 armoured vehicles and trucks in the convoy and just 12 out of 199 Russian soldiers survived "the slaughter", while the rebel losses were only three killed and six wounded.

According to the Russian book Chechenskiy Kapkan, up to 100 fighters ambushed the column of 30 Russian armoured vehicles, almost or up to 100 soldiers were killed and "only eight or nine soldiers escaped with their lives".

== Aftermath ==
A video of the ambush, which shows the Russians were under the feet of the mujahideen, widely distributed and celebrated in Chechnya, featured Khattab and other chechen fighters "walking triumphantly down a line of blackened and destroyed Russian vehicles and corpses", and gained him early fame in Chechnya and great notoriety in Russia. The images of carnage also caused new calls for Russia's defence minister Pavel Grachev to resign, while Russia suspended its limited troop withdrawal.
