= Islamic International Peacekeeping Brigade =

Islamist militant organization in southwestern Russia from 1998 to 2002

- Исламская международная миротворческая бригада
- Leaders: Shamil Basayev; Ibn al-Khattab; Arbi Barayev; Ramzan Akhmadov
- Dates active: 1998–2002
- Headquarters: Grozny, Chechnya
- Active regions: Chechnya; Dagestan
- Ideology: Islamic fundamentalism Separatism
- Size: 1,000–3,000
- Part of: Congress of the Peoples of Ichkeria and Dagestan
- Wars: War in Dagestan

The Islamic International Peacekeeping Brigade (Russian: Исламская международная миротворческая бригада; abbr. IIPB), also known as the Islamic International Brigade and the Islamic Peacekeeping Army, was the name of an international Islamist mujahideen organization founded in 1998. IIPB was designated a terrorist entity by the United States in February 2003.

== History ==
The unit was composed of between 400 and 1,500 militants, most of them Dagestanis (mainly Avars and Darginians), as well as Chechens, Arabs, Turks and other foreign fighters. Its Emirs were Ibn al-Khattab, Shamil Basayev who fought during the War in Dagestan. Many of the group's members were killed or captured by Russian forces. They gained notoriety during their involvement in the Tukhchar massacre where they executed six Russian POWs on tape, all of which were members of the Russian Interior Troops. Most of its remaining members fought in the Second Chechen War, in which its former leaders died (Khattab in March 2002 and Basayev in July 2006).
