= Mujahideen in Chechnya =

International unit of the Islamist Mujahideen

- Arabic: المجاهدون العرب في الشيشان
- Jihadist black flag and Coat of Arms of the ChRI
- Founder: Fathi al-Urduni
- Leaders: Ibn al-Khattab (1999–2002); Abu al-Walid (2002–2004); Abu Hafs al-Urduni (2004–2006); Muhannad (2006–2011); Abdullah al-Kurdi (2011)
- Dates active: 1995–2012
- Allegiance: Chechen Republic of Ichkeria; Caucasus Emirate (since 2007)
- Ideology: Islamism; Jihadism
- Size: Hundreds

The Mujahideen in Chechnya (Russian: моджахеды в Чечне, Muzhakhady v Chechnye; Arabic: المجاهدون العرب في الشيشان) were foreign Islamist Mujahideen volunteers that fought in Chechnya and other parts of the North Caucasus.

It was created by Fathi al-Urduni in 1995 during the First Chechen War, where it fought against the Russian Federation in favor of Chechnya's independence as the Chechen Republic of Ichkeria. During the Second Chechen War it played an important part in further fighting.

== Name ==
The unit has been known by several names throughout its existence. Examples include the Chechen Mujahideen, the Islamic Regiment, the Islamic Battalion, the Arabs in Chechnya and the Ansaar in Chechnya.

Although the overwhelming majority of the unit has always consisted of Arab volunteers, there were also members of non-Arab, usually Kurds, Turks and other North Cauсasians. It is not to be confused with the Special Purpose Islamic Regiment (SPIR), al-Qaeda’s 055 Brigade or the Islamic International Peacekeeping Brigade (IIPB).

== History ==
Foreign Mujahideen have played an important part in both First and Second Chechen Wars. After the collapse of the Soviet Union and the subsequent Chechen declaration of independence, foreign fighters started entering the region and associated themselves with Chechen rebels, most notably Shamil Basayev with whom Ibn al-Khattab build up a friendship. Many of them were veterans of the Soviet–Afghan War and prior to the Russian invasion, they used their expertise to train Chechen fighters.

== First Chechen War and Interwar period ==
During the First Chechen War they were notorious and feared for their guerilla tactics, inflicting severe casualties on Russian forces. The mujahideen also made a significant financial contribution to the Chechen cause; with their access to the immense wealth of Salafist charities like al-Haramein, they soon became an invaluable source of funds for the Chechen resistance, which had little to no resources of its own.

After the withdrawal of Russian forces from Chechnya most of the mujahideen decided to remain in the country, including Khattab who married a woman from Dagestan. In 1999, foreign fighters played an important role in the War of Dagestan. Shamil Basayev and Khattab had created the Islamic International Peacekeeping Brigade which was composed of Chechen fighters. The invasion was started in support of the Islamic Djamaat of Dagestan separatist rebels. After the battle, they retreated back into Chechnya. The incursion provided the new Russian government with a pretext for intervention and in December 1999 Russian ground forces invaded Chechnya again.

== Second Chechen War ==
During the ensuing Second Chechen War, the Arab Mujahideen played another important part, both for delivering fighters and their financial contributions. It was during this time that the Russians succeeded in eliminating the most prominent mujahideen commanders Ibn al-Khattab and Abu al-Walid.

== Commanders ==
=== As Mujahideen in Chechnya ===
- Ibn al-Khattab (1999–2002)
- Abu al-Walid (2002–2004)
- Abu Hafs al-Urduni (2004–2006)
- Muhannad (2006–2011)
- Abdulla Kurd (2011)

== Structure ==
The foreign battalion was mostly composed of Arabs, however, there were also Caucasian and Kurdish fighters in relatively small numbers. All known Emirs (leaders) are deceased. Its first Emir was Ibn Al-Khattab (Saudi) who was killed in March 2002 and succeeded by Abu al-Walid (Saudi), who was killed in April 2004. His successor became Abu Hafs al-Urduni (Jordanian) who was killed in November 2006. He was succeeded by Muhannad (Saudi), who was killed in a clash with security forces in the Chechen village of Serzhen-Yurt on 21 April 2011. Several weeks later, his successor Abdulla Kurd (Kurdish) was also killed. The battalion was split into multiple units of Mujahideen commanded by their respective Emirs which disbanded by 2012.

== See also ==
- Pan-Islamism
- White Tights (Alleged female Baltic snipers in the Chechen Wars)

Afghanistan

- Afghan mujahideen
- Afghan Arabs

Yugoslav wars

- Bosnian mujahideen

Iraqi conflict

- Kurdish Mujahideen

Syrian Conflict

- Chechen mujahideen in Syria
