= Pankisi =

Gorge in Georgia

Pankisi Gorge
- Georgian: პანკისის ხეობა
- Location within Georgia Location within Kakheti

Geography
- Country: Georgia
- Coordinates: 42°07′N 45°16′E
- Interactive map of Pankisi Gorge

Pankisi (Georgian: პანკისი) or the Pankisi Gorge (Georgian: პანკისის ხეობა, Pankisis Kheoba) (Note: Chechen: ПӀаьнгазхойн чӀаж, romanized: Phängazkhoyn ch'azh, Ingush: ПӀенгишхой чӀож, romanized: Phengishkhoy ch'ozh) is a valley region in Georgia, in the upper reaches of River Alazani. It lies just south of Georgia's historic region of Tusheti between Mt Borbalo and the ruined 17th-century fortress of Bakhtrioni.

Administratively, Pankisi is included in the Akhmeta municipality of the Kakheti region. The area is about two and half miles wide and eight miles long.

From November 2000 until 2002, the valley played host to an armed formation led by the Chechen commander Ruslan Gelayev, who had fled the Second Chechen War. After the September 11 terrorist attacks in 2001, both Russian and American political figures made public allegations, which were subsequently either disproved or uncorroborated, that senior Al-Qaeda leaders were present in the Gorge, and had acquired the nerve agent ricin. The Gorge has occasionally been mentioned in subsequent reports linking it to Salafi-jihadist activity.

As of 2019, the Kist ethnic group accounted for the majority of the area's roughly 5,000 residents. The Kists are Vainakhs, usually of Chechen roots, who have moved to the Pankisi area since the 19th Century. Kist culture combines Vainakh traditions with some influences from surrounding eastern Georgia.

== History ==
The location of the Pankisi Gorge in Georgia

The 17th-century geographer and historian Prince Vakhushti Bagrationi, in his book Description of the Kingdom of Georgia, writes that the inhabitants of Pankisi were Georgian nobility of the Aznauri and Tavadi classes, although his account makes clear that there were also peasants in the area. He described them as intelligent, and as "skilled warriors."

Vakhushti described Pankisi itself as forested, with plentiful fruit trees, and vineyards that produced good wine. He added that the harvests were good, and the forests rich in game. Fish were also numerous, he wrote, especially "mountain trout", and there were many cattle, and many pigs, but few sheep.

In the 1730s, the Pankisi valley was emptied of Georgian population: part of them were killed as a result of the invasions, and rest of them resettled elsewhere.

In 18th century Georgian legislation, the noble (Aznauri) Kobiashvili family of the Kingdom of Kakheti are mentioned as the lords of the Pankisi valley.

Georgia's 1989 census found that the Pankisi Gorge's population was 43% Kist, 29% Georgian, and 28% Ossetian. However, during the subsequent two decades the valley's ethnic composition changed again under the pressure of regional wars. Many of the valley's Ossetians fled from the South Ossetia War and the Georgian Civil War, to settle in North Ossetia-Alania in the Russian Federation. Chechens fled from the two wars in Chechnya, which had attempted to secede from the Russian Federation, and some made their homes in Pankisi's villages. By 2007, the Kists were the largest ethnic group in the area.

The 2014 census did not report a separate demographic breakdown for Pankisi, but found that the wider Akhmeta municipality was home to 5,471 Kists, who constituted roughly 17% of the municipal population. By 2019, Kists were reported to be a majority of Pankisi's roughly-5,000 inhabitants.

== Etymology ==
According to Mate Albutashvili (also known as Kisti Chobani), the toponym Pankisi is of Georgian origin. He writes that Pankisi derives from Pantisi which means "land rich in wild forest pears", (P’ant’a-პანტა) (pyrus caucasica) with the Georgian suffix -სი(si).

== Pankisi Gorge crisis and local links to Salafi-jidhadism ==
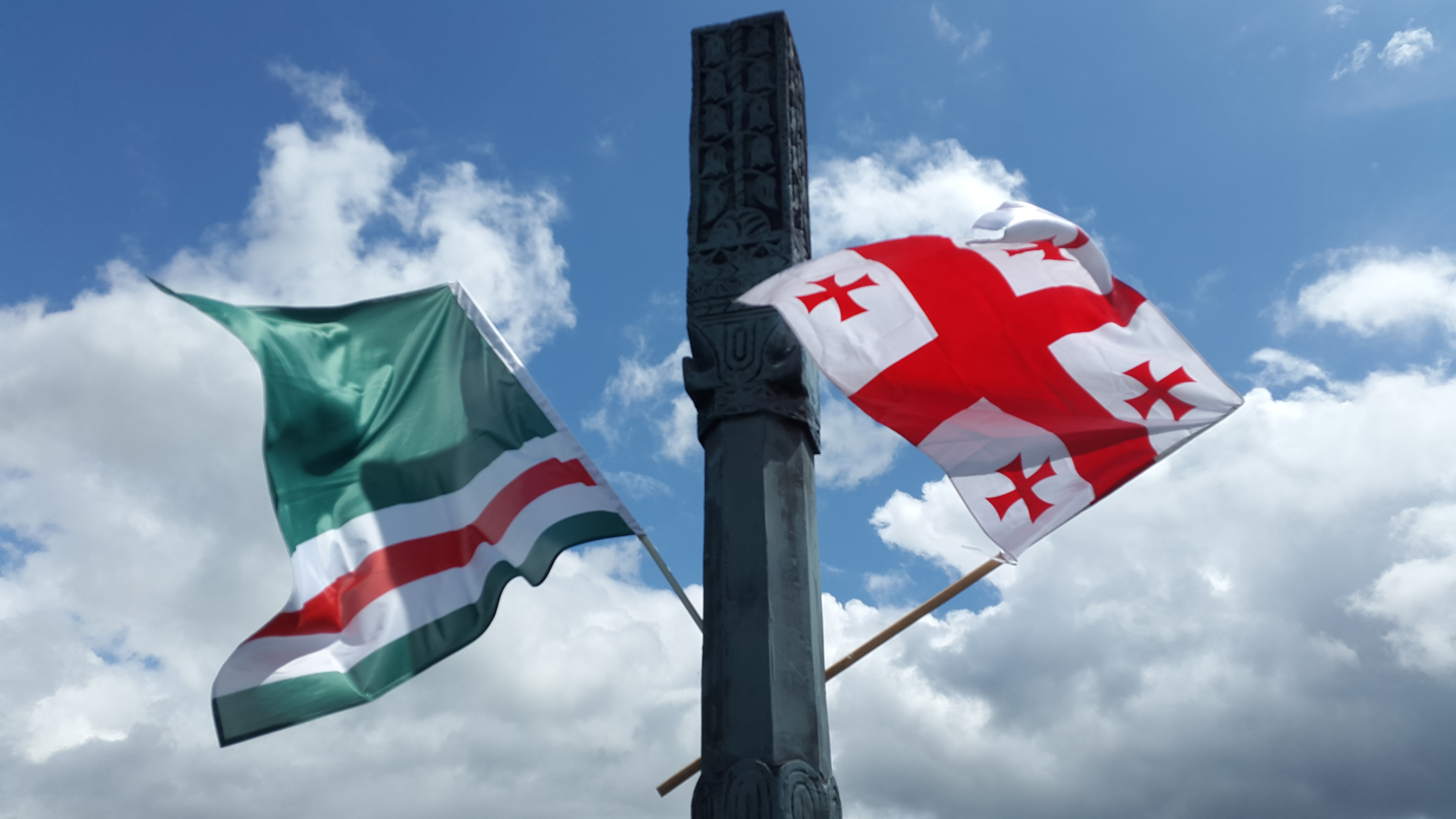
The flags of the Chechen Republic of Ichkeria and Georgia flying side-by-side in the Pankisi Gorge

The Pankisi Gorge crisis was a 2002 geopolitical dispute that arose as a direct result of the Second Chechen War, and which was shaped by the U.S. Global War on Terror and pre-existing tensions between Russia and Georgia. From 1999, thousands of refugees from the war in Chechnya, 25 miles to the north, congregated in the valley, including some armed rebels. By 2002, Ruslan Gelayev, a Chechen commander was reported to have gathered hundreds of armed men there.

Russia wanted Georgia to act against Gelayev's band, but Georgia was in dispute with Russia over South Ossetia and Abkhazia, and declined to do so. On the contrary, Gelayev's force allegedly fought on behalf of Georgia in Abkhazia in 2001.

Both Russian and U.S. leaders made public claims during 2002 and 2003 that Al-Qaeda was operating in the valley, and that a "Chechen network" associated with the organisation had learned to manufacture ricin, a lethal nerve agent. In Russia's case, the claims, which were unfounded, may have been made in an effort to persuade the U.S. to put pressure on Georgia to expel Gelayev and his men. In the event, Gelayev led his column out of Georgia and back onto Russian territory in September 2003, after which Georgian authorities conducted an operation in the Pankisi Gorge. It netted 15 alleged militants of Arab heritage, none of whom were thought to have been senior.

Nonetheless, in Colin Powell's presentation to the United Nations Security Council in February 2003, the Secretary of State claimed to know that associates of the Al-Qaeda leader Musab al-Zarqawi had

been active in the Pankisi Gorge, Georgia and in Chechnya, Russia. The plotting to which they are linked is not mere chatter. Members of Zarqawi's network say their goal was to kill Russians with toxins.

Powell showed a slide that depicted a purported Al-Qaeda network under the command of al-Zarqawi, including a bearded man named Abu 'Atiya located in Pankisi, Georgia. Abu 'Atiya was reportedly arrested in Azerbaijan on 12 August 2003, and deported to Jordan.

In 2008, the valley was reported to be peaceful despite the nearby Russo-Georgian war, and substantial numbers of refugees from Chechnya remained living there

The former senior Islamic State leader Tarkan Batirashvili, otherwise known as "Omar the Chechen," grew up in Pankisi, which was still home to some of his family as of 2014. In 2014, Batirashvilii reportedly threatened to return to the area to lead a Muslim attack on Russian Chechnya. However, the threat never came into fruition, and Batirashvili was killed during a battle in the Iraqi town of Al-Shirqat in 2016.

== Notable people ==
- Zezva Gaprindauli, a leader of the Kakhetian Uprising (1659) against the rule of Safavid Persia, fortified himself in the Pankisi fortress, but was later captured and executed.
- Kakutsa Cholokashvili (1888–1930), commander of an anti-Soviet guerrilla movement, was born in the Pankisi village of Matani. He made his base of operations initially in Pankisi, and later, with the Khevsurs in Chechnya.
- Daro Sulakauri (1985–present), Georgian photojournalist and documentary photographer known for her documentation of Chechen refugees living in the Pankisi Gorge.

=== Jihadists and North-Caucasian separatists ===
A number of transnational jihadists and North-Caucasian separatists - especially Chechens - were either born in, lived in, or passed through the Pankisi Gorge - among them Zelimkhan Khangoshvili. Several fought in the first or second Chechen wars, were implicated in the Pankisi Gorge crisis, or fought in the Syrian civil war.

== Bibliography ==
- Kurtsikidze, Shorena; Chikovani, Vakhtang (2008). Ethnography and Folklore of the Georgia-Chechnya Border: Images, Customs, Myths & Folk Tales of the Peripheries. Munich: Lincom Europa.
