= Abu Omar al-Kuwaiti =

Kuwaiti al-Qaeda member

Ahmad Nasser Eid Abdullah Al-Fajri Al-Azimi, also, Abu Omar Al-Kuwaiti and Abu Zaid (1972 – 16 February 2005) was a Kuwaiti and suspected al-Qaeda agent operating first in Afghanistan and later in Chechnya and the wider Caucasus area.

== Biography ==
Abu Zaid worked as an actor in Kuwaiti TV programs for children until he turned to religion and started working as an Imam at the Safwan Bin Omayah Mosque of Kuwait City. His tenure as Imam was brief, as he was terminated for illegally collecting donations from the mosque goers. In 1998, Abu Zaid travelled to Afghanistan where he reportedly trained at al-Qaeda’s Al Farouq training camp. In 1999, he travelled to Chechnya. The Russian government later accused him of involvement in terrorist activity, including the Beslan school hostage crisis.

On 16 February 2005, Abu Zaid died after having been surrounded by Russian special forces in his safehouse in Ingushetia. He was married to a Chechen woman, with whom he had two sons.
