= Ibn al-Khattab =

Saudi jihadist (1969–2002)

- ابن الخطاب

1st Emir of the Arab Mujahideen in Chechnya
- In office 2000–2002
- Preceded by: Position established
- Succeeded by: Abu al-Walid

Personal details
- Born: 14 April 1969 Arar, Saudi Arabia
- Died: 19 March 2002 (aged 32) Chechnya, Russia
- Cause of death: Poisoning
- Nicknames: Lion of Chechnya; Sword of Islam

Military service
- Allegiance: Afghan mujahideen Azerbaijan; United Tajik Opposition; Bosnian mujahideen Chechen mujahideen
- Years of service: 1987–2002
- Commands: Islamic International Brigade
- Battles/wars: Soviet–Afghan War; First Afghan Civil War; Battle of Jalalabad; Tajik Civil War; First Nagorno-Karabakh War; Yugoslav Wars; Bosnian War; First Chechen War; War in Dagestan; Second Chechen War; Battle for Argun; Battle for Height 776

Samir Salih Abdullah al-Suwaylim (Note: Arabic: سامر صالح عبد الله السويلم) (14 April 1969 – 19 March 2002), commonly known as Ibn al-Khattab, (Note: Arabic: ابن الخطاب) was a Saudi-born pan-Islamist militant. He is best known for his involvement in the First and Second Chechen War, which he participated in after moving to Chechnya at the invitation of the Akhmadov brothers.

The origins and real identity of Khattab remained a mystery to most until after his death, when his brother gave an interview to the press. His death in 2002 had followed his exposure to a poisoned letter, which had been delivered to him by a personal courier who was secretly recruited by the Federal Security Service (FSB) of the Russian Federation.

According to American scholar Muhammad al-Ubaydi who specializes in the study of militant Islam, his continued relevance is due to the fact that he was the internationalist Salafi jihadist fighter par excellence: he was born in Saudi Arabia and had taken part in conflicts in Afghanistan, Azerbaijan, Bosnia and Herzegovina, Chechnya, Dagestan, and Tajikistan, and who in addition to his native Arabic was able to communicate in English, Kurdish, Pashto, Persian, Chechen and Russian. Compounding this was his approach towards attracting non-Arab Muslims to fight for his cause and his pioneering use of modern media dissemination techniques to promote jihad, particularly by way of publishing military videos for propaganda purposes.

== Early life and education ==
The origins of Ibn al-Khattab were a subject of debate during his lifetime. Sources linked to intelligence services and the Russian press described him as Habib Abd al-Rahman Ibn al-Khattab, born in 1963 in Jordan, into a family of Jordanian-Circassian origin. This version was widely circulated by reports such as those of the Jamestown Foundation and went unchallenged by significant documentary evidence for years.

Later family and academic identification established a different account. According to his elder brother, Mansour Al-Suwaylim, Khattab's real name was Samir Salih Abdullah Al-Suwaylim. He was born in Arar, a city in Saudi Arabia, in 1969. His father was a Bedouin of the Arab Suwaylim tribe, and his mother was of Syrian Turkmen descent. The academic biography published by the Combating Terrorism Center (CTC) at the United States Military Academy corroborates this identification, confirming that Khattab was born in Saudi Arabia and that his family originated in the Eastern Province of the country.

He was described as a brilliant student, scoring 94 percent in the secondary school examination, and initially wanted to continue his higher studies in the United States, even if he was already fond of Islamic periodicals and tapes as opposed to his siblings, to the extent they renamed him after the second caliph Umar ibn al-Khattab. He would retain the title during his militant activities, which began in 1987, by joining the Afghan Arabs against the Afghan Government Forces and the Soviet Army.

== Career ==
=== Afghanistan ===
At the age of 17, Khattab left Saudi Arabia to participate in the fight against forces of the Republic of Afghanistan and the Soviet Union during the Soviet–Afghan War and the following Afghan Civil War. During this time, he lost the majority of his right hand after an accident with IEDs. He never visited the hospital, and he healed it by himself using honey, as per the Prophetic medicine. He would participate in the botched Battle of Jalalabad in 1989.

Khattab, while the leader of Islamic International Brigade, publicly admitted that he spent the period between 1989 and 1994 in Afghanistan and that he had met Osama bin Laden and Zawahiri. In March 1994, Khattab arrived in Afghanistan and toured fighter training camps in Khost province. He returned to Afghanistan with the first group of Chechen militants in May 1994. Khattab underwent training in Afghanistan and had close connections with al-Qaeda. Several hundred Chechens eventually trained in al-Qaeda camps in Afghanistan.

=== Azerbaijan, Tajikistan, and Bosnia–Herzegovina ===
Armenian sources claim that in 1992 he was one of many Chechen volunteers who aided Azerbaijan in the embattled region of Nagorno-Karabakh, where he allegedly met Shamil Basayev. However, the Azerbaijani Ministry of Defense denied any involvement by Khattab in the First Nagorno-Karabakh War.

From 1993 to 1995, Khattab left to fight alongside Islamic opposition in the Tajikistan Civil War. Before leaving for Tajikistan in 1994, al-Khattab gave Abdulkareem Khadr a pet rabbit of his own, which was promptly named Khattab.

In an interview, Khattab once mentioned he had also been involved in the Bosnian War. The fragment of this interview in which he makes this statement can be found in the 2004 BBC documentary The Smell of Paradise, though he did not specify his exact role or the duration of his presence there.

=== Russia ===
==== First Chechen War ====
According to Khattab's brother, he first heard about the Chechen conflict on an Afghan television channel in 1995; that same year, he entered Chechnya, posing as a television reporter. He was credited as being a pioneer in producing video footage of Chechen rebel combat operations in order to aid fundraising efforts as well as international recruitment, and he himself achieved notoriety in 1996 when he himself filmed an ambush he led against a Russian armored column in Shatoy. Not long after his arrival he married an ethnic Lak woman from Dagestan, the sister of Nadyr Khachiliev, an Islamist and leader of the Union of the Muslims of Russia, which has been seen as a way to already internationalize the Chechen struggle.

During the First Chechen War, Khattab participated in fighting Russian federal forces and acted as an intermediary financier between foreign Muslim funding sources and the local fighters. To help secure funding and spread the message of resistance, he was frequently accompanied by at least one cameraman.

Also, during the First Chechen War, Khattab frequently used the Saudi Arabian flag to represent himself, and continued to view himself a Saudi citizen while fighting under the leadership of Dzhokhar Dudayev. He received financial support from Saudi sources, and his activities were recognised by prominent Saudi religious scholars, including former Grand Mufti Ibn Baz, Al-Uthaymin, and Ibn Jibrin.

His units were credited with several devastating ambushes on Russian columns in the Chechen mountains. His first action was the October 1995 ambush of a Russian convoy which killed 47 soldiers. Khattab gained early fame and a great notoriety in Russia for his April 1996 ambush of a large armored column in a narrow gorge of Yaryshmardy, near Shatoy, which killed up to 100 soldiers and destroyed some two or three dozen vehicles. In another ambush, near Vedeno, at least 28 Russian troops were killed.

In 1996 on the order from Aslan Maskhadov President of Chechnya, Khattab was appointed as the Chief of Military Training Center of the Central Front of the ChRI Armed Forces.

In the course of the war, Shamil Basayev became his closest ally and personal friend. He was also associated with Zelimkhan Yandarbiyev, who gave Khattab two of the highest Chechen military awards, the Order of Honor and the Brave Warrior medal, and promoted him to the rank of general in 1997.

A senior Chechen commander by the name of Izmailov told press how Khattab urged restraint, citing the Quran, when at the end of the war the Chechens wanted to shoot those they considered traitors.

==== Activity in the Chechen Republic of Ichkeria ====
After the conclusion of the war, Khattab, by then wanted by Interpol on Russia's request, became a prominent warlord and commanded the Chechen Mujahideen, his own private army with a group of Arabs, Turks, Chechens, Kurds, and other foreign fighters who had come to participate in the war. He set up a network of paramilitary camps in the mountainous parts of the republic that trained not only Chechens, but also Muslims from the North Caucasian Russian republics and Central Asia.

On 22 December 1997, over a year after the signing of the Khasav-Yurt treaty and the end of the first war in Chechnya, the mujahideen and a group of Dagestani rebels raided a Russian Ground Forces base in Buinaksk, Dagestan. The base was home to the 136th Separate Guards Motor Rifle Brigade.

==== War in Dagestan ====
In 1998, along with Shamil Basayev, Khattab created or reorganized the Mazhlis ul Shura of the United Mujahids (Consultative Council of United Holy Warriors), the Congress of the Peoples of Dagestan and Ichkeriya, the Special Purpose Islamic Regiment (SPIR), the Islamic International Peacekeeping Brigade (IIPB) (also known as the Islamic Peacekeeping Army) and a group of female suicide bombers, the Riyadus-Salikhin Reconnaissance and Sabotage Battalion of Chechen Shahids. In August–September 1999, they led the IIPB's incursions into Dagestan, which resulted in the deaths of at least several hundred people and effectively started the Second Chechen War.

==== 1999 Russian apartment bombings ====
A Federal Security Service of the Russian Federation (FSB) investigation named Khattab as the mastermind behind the September 1999 Russian apartment bombings. However, on 14 September 1999, Khattab told the Russian Interfax news agency in Grozny that he had nothing to do with the Moscow explosions; he was quoted as saying, "We would not like to be akin to those who kill sleeping civilians with bombs and shells."

Some journalists and historians, both western and Russian, have claimed that the bombings were in fact a "false flag" attack perpetrated by the FSB in order to legitimize the resumption of military activities in Chechnya. Among them are Johns Hopkins University scholar David Satter, historians Yuri Felshtinsky, Amy Knight and Karen Dawisha, and former FSB officer Alexander Litvinenko who was believed to be poisoned by Russian agents in London.

However, the invasion of Dagestan in August 1999 was the first and the main casus belli for the Second Chechen War.

==== Second Chechen War ====
During the course of the war in 2000, Khattab took over the leadership of the Chechen Mujahideen and participated in leading his militia against Russian forces in Chechnya, as well as managing the influx of foreign fighters and money and also planning of attacks in Russia.

He led or commanded several devastating attacks during this year, such as the mountain battle, which killed at least 67 Russian paratroopers, and the attack on the OMON convoy near Zhani-Vedeno, which killed at least 3 Russian Interior Ministry troops. During the war, he produced the Russian Hell video, which showcases the torture and execution of Russian soldiers and would later become popular among Islamist militants internationally.

Khattab later survived a heavy-calibre bullet wound to the stomach and a landmine explosion.

== Death and legacy ==
Khattab died of poisoning on 19 March 2002, when a Dagestani messenger hired by the Russian FSB gave Khattab a poisoned letter the day before. Chechen sources said that the letter was coated with "a fast-acting nerve agent, possibly sarin or a derivative". The messenger, a Dagestani double agent known as Ibragim Alauri, was turned by the FSB on his routine courier mission. Khattab would receive letters from his mother in Saudi Arabia, and the FSB found this to be the most opportune moment to kill Khattab. It was reported that the operation to recruit and turn Ibragim Alauri to work for the FSB and deliver the poisoned letter took some six months of preparation. Alauri was reportedly tracked down and killed a month later in Baku, Azerbaijan on Shamil Basayev's orders. Ibn Al-Khattab was succeeded by Emir Abu al-Walid.

He was falsely reported dead when Omar Mohammed Ali Al-Rammah, a Yemeni prisoner at Guantanamo Bay, faced the allegations that he witnessed Khattab being killed in an ambush in Duisi, a village in the Pankisi Gorge of Georgia on 28 April 2002.

"Khattabka" (хаттабка) is now a popular Russian and Chechen name for an improvised hand grenade, made from either VOG-17 or VOG-25 grenades.

Due to his fierce opposition and devotion against Russia, he was nicknamed the Lion of Chechnya.

=== Relationship with Osama bin Laden ===
According to Fawaz Gerges who cited Saif al-Adel and Abu Walid al Masri's diaries, Ibn al-Khattab and Osama bin Laden operated separate groups, as they defined the enemy differently, but tried to pull each other to their own battle plans. A part of bin Laden's interest was trying to obtain weapons of mass destruction (or at least dirty bombs) from the Russian arsenal through al-Khattab's contacts.

According to Richard A. Clarke, "Bin Laden sent Afghan Arab veterans, money, and arms to fellow Saudi Ibn al-Khattab in Chechnya, which seemed like a perfect theater for jihad."

== Works ==
He wrote his memoirs entitled Memories of Amir Khattab: The Experience of the Arab Muhajireen in Chechnya, Afghanistan and Tajikistan.
