= 1999 war in Dagestan =

Conflict in the Dagestan, Russia

War in Dagestan
- Part of the spillover of the Second Chechen War
- Map of the war in Dagestan. Areas occupied by Islamists shown in grey.
Date	7 August – 14 September 1999 (1 month and 1 week)
Location	Dagestan, Russia
Result	Russian victory

Belligerents
Islamic Djamaat of Dagestan; CPID; Chechen militants; IIPB; SPIR; Religious Police	Russia; Armed Forces; Army; Navy; Air Force; VDV; Spetsnaz GRU; FSB; MVD; Militsiya; Internal Troops; OMON; SOBR; Dagestan; Dagestani police and local militia

Commanders and leaders
Shamil Basayev; Ramzan Akhmadov; Dokka Umarov; Movladi Udugov; Ibn al-Khattab; Abu Zarr Shishani; Arbi Barayev; Movsar Suleimanov; Abdul-Malik Mezhidov; Abdul-Vahhab Shishani; Ismail Razakov; Khunkar-Pasha Israpilov; Shirvani Basaev; Abu al-Walid; Hakim al-Medani †; Yaqub al-Ghamidi; Abu Jafar al-Yemeni; Rappani Khalilov; Abdurrahman az-Zarki; Magomed Tsagarayev; Ruslan Haihoroev †; Huta Ahmadov †; Garib Shishani; Baudi Bakuyev; Umar Edilsultanov; Isa Umarov; Adallo Aliev; Sirazhudin Ramazanov; Bagaudin Kebedov; Magomed Tagaev	Boris Yeltsin; Sergei Stepashin; Vladimir Putin; Viktor Kazantsev; Gennady Troshev; Alexander Baranov; Adilgerei Magomedtagirov; Magomed Omarov; Magomedali Magomedov; Said Amirov

Strength
Up to 1,500–2,000 fighters in early August, more than 10,000 militants by the end of September	17,000 soldiers, thousands of policemen and volunteers

Casualties and losses
Russian claim: 2,500 militants killed	275 servicemen killed, 15 missing and 937 wounded (per Russia); Significant losses to local Dagestani police and militias

The 1999 war in Dagestan, also known as the Dagestan incursions (Russian: Война в Дагестане), was an armed conflict that began when the Ichkerian-based Islamic International Peacekeeping Brigade (IIPB), an Islamist group led by Shamil Basayev, Ibn al-Khattab, Ramzan Akhmadov and Arbi Barayev, invaded the neighboring Russian republic of Dagestan on 7 August 1999. They did so in support of the Shura of Dagestan separatist rebels.

The war ended with a major victory for the Russian Federation and the Republic of Dagestan, and the retreat of the IIPB. The invasion of Dagestan, alongside a series of apartment bombings in September 1999, served as the main casus belli for the Second Chechen War.

== Background ==
During the inter-war period of 1996 to 1999, a war-ravaged Chechnya descended into chaos and economic collapse. Aslan Maskhadov's government was unable to rebuild the region or to prevent a number of warlords from taking effective control. The relationship between the government and radicals deteriorated. In March 1999, Maskhadov closed down the Chechen parliament and introduced aspects of Sharia. Despite this concession, extremists such as Shamil Basayev and the Saudi-born Islamist Ibn Al-Khattab continued to undermine the Maskhadov government. In April 1998, the group publicly declared that its long-term aim was the creation of a union of Chechnya and Dagestan under Islamic rule and the expulsion of Russians from the entire Caucasian Region.

In late 1997, Bagaudtin Kebedov (also known as Bagaudtin Magomedov), the ethnic Avar leader of the radical wing of the Dagestani Wahhabis (Salafists), fled with his followers to Chechnya. There he established close ties with Ibn Al-Khattab and other leaders of Chechnya's Wahhabi community. In January 1999, Khattab began the formation of an "Islamic Legion" with foreign Muslim volunteers. At the same time, he commanded the "peacemaking unit of the Majlis (Parliament) of Ichkeria and Dagestan". A series of invasions of Dagestan from Chechnya took place during the inter-war period, culminating in the 1997 attack on a federal military garrison of the 136th Motorized Rifle Regiment near the Dagestani town of Buinaksk. Other attacks targeted civilians and Dagestani police on a regular basis.

In April 1999, Kebedov, the "Emir of the Islamic Djamaat of Dagestan," made an appeal to the "Islamic patriots of the Caucasus" to "take part in the jihad" and participate in "liberating Dagestan and the Caucasus from the Russian colonial yoke." According to this "prominent" Wahhabi's vision, proponents of the idea of a free Islamic Dagestan were to enlist in the "Islamic Army of the Caucasus" that he founded, and report to the army's headquarters in the village of Karamakhi for military duty. Chechen separatist government official Turpal-Ali Atgeriyev claimed that he alerted the Federal Security Service of the Russian Federation (FSB) Director Vladimir Putin, in the summer of 1999, of the imminent invasion of Dagestan.

== Invasion and the Russian counterattack ==
On 4 August 1999, several Russian Ministry of Internal Affairs (MVD) servicemen were killed in a border clash with a group of Kebedov's fighters. On 7 August Shamil Basayev and Ibn al-Khattab officially launched an invasion into Dagestan with a group of roughly 1,500–2,000 armed militants consisting of Islamic radicals from Chechnya, including other international Islamists.

Khattab described himself as the "military commander of the operation", while Basayev was the "overall commander in the battlefield". They seized villages in the districts of Tsumadi (Echeda, Gakko, Kedy, Kvanada, Gadiri and Gigatl) and Botlikh (Godoberi, Miarso, Shodroda, Ansalta, Rakhata and Inkhelo). On 10 August, they announced the birth of the "independent Islamic State of Dagestan" and declared war on "the traitorous Dagestani government" and "Russia's occupation units".

The federal military response to the invasion was slow, and the efforts were initially fumbling and disorganized. As a result, all of the early resistance, and much of the later resistance, was undertaken by Dagestani police, spontaneously organized citizen militias, and individual Dagestani villagers. Basayev and Khattab were not welcomed as "liberators" as they had expected; the Dagestani villagers considered the invaders as unwelcome religious fanatics. Instead of an anti-Russian uprising, a mass mobilization of volunteers formed in the border areas against the invading army.

As resistance to the invaders stiffened, Russian artillery and airstrikes came into action. The first use of aerially delivered thermobaric weapons against populated areas occurred in this conflict, notably on the village of Tando by the federal forces. The rebels were stalled by the ferocity of the bombardments: their supply lines were cut and scattered with remotely detonating mines. This gave Moscow time to assemble a counter-attack under Colonel-General Viktor Kazantsev, commander of the North Caucasus Military District. On 23 August, Basayev and Khattab announced they were withdrawing from Botlikhsky District to "redeploy" and begin a "new phase" in their operations. The war also saw the first use of the T-90 tank. In the Kadar zone, a group of 8 to 12 T-90S tanks pushed through stubborn resistance. One of the tanks was hit by seven rocket-propelled grenades and remained in action.

On the night of 4 September, as the federal forces were wiping out the last bastions of resistance in the Kadar region, a car bomb destroyed a military housing building in the Dagestani town of Buynaksk, killing 64 people, the first in a wave of Russian apartment bombings. On the morning of 5 September, Chechen rebels launched a second invasion into the lowland Novolaksky region of Dagestan, seizing the border village of Tukhchar, this time with a larger force numbering 200 fighters led by Umar Edilsultanov. Several Russian and Dagestani troops were executed on the way as they captured the village. The rebels came within a mere five kilometers of the major city of Khasavyurt. The second invasion at the height of the hostilities in the Karamakhi zone on 5 September came as an unpleasant surprise to Moscow and Makhachkala. According to Basayev, the purpose of the second invasion was to distract federal forces attacking Karamakhi and Chabanmakhi. Intensive fighting continued until 12 September, when federal forces supported by local volunteers finally forced the Islamists back to Chechnya, even though sporadic armed clashes continued for some time.

By 13 September, all the villages had been recaptured, and the militants were routed and pushed back fully into Chechnya the following day. Meanwhile, the Russian Air Force had already begun bombing targets inside Chechnya. The federal side announced that they suffered 275 dead, 15 missing and approximately 937 wounded. The number of civilians killed were never compiled.

== Aftermath ==
Russia followed up with a bombing campaign of southeastern Chechnya; on 23 September, Russian fighter jets bombed targets in and around the Chechen capital Grozny. Aslan Maskhadov, the president of the Chechen Republic of Ichkeria, opposed the invasion of Dagestan, and offered a crackdown on the renegade warlords. This offer was refused by the Russian government. In October 1999, after a string of four apartment bombings for which Russia blamed the Chechens, Russian ground forces invaded Chechnya, starting the Second Chechen War. After the Russian victory, Dagestan has been a site of an ongoing, low-level insurgency, which became part of the whole insurgency in the North Caucasus. This conflict between the government and the armed Islamist underground in Dagestan (in particular the Shariat Jamaat group) was aided by the Chechen guerrillas. It claimed the lives of hundreds of people, mostly civilians.

The invasion of Dagestan resulted in the displacement of 32,000 Dagestani civilians. According to researcher Robert Bruce Ware, Basayev and Khattab's invasions were potentially genocidal, in that they attacked mountain villages accommodating entire populations of small ethno-linguistic groups. Furthermore, Ware asserts that the invasions are properly described as terrorist attacks because they initially involved attacks against Dagestani civilians and police officers.

== Opposing forces ==
=== Federal forces ===
Despite the initial poor showing of the government forces (for example, military helicopters were hit by anti-tank guided missiles during a rebel raid on the Botlikh airfield), Moscow and Makhachkala were able to put together an impressive fighting force. For instance, the light infantry units were partially drawn from the Spetsnaz, paratroopers and naval infantry, crucial to mountain and counter-insurgency warfare.

The government forces consisted of three main elements: light and air mobile infantry units able to operate in the mountains and in small ambush and assault forces; larger mechanized units to seal areas off and maintain area security; and artillery with air support elements that were able to interdict supply lines and box in the rebels. Most of the 'teeth' were drawn from regular army units, with the exception of the MVD's Internal Troops' 102nd Brigade, the Rus commando force and the local Dagestani OMON. Makhachala long expected an incident of this sort, and since its OMON troops proved ineffectual in 1996 when Chechen rebels seized hostages in the Dagestani city of Kizlyar, it placed a part of its scarce resources into turning this force into a small local army. The Dagestani OMON force numbered almost 1,000 men and, bar the absence of heavy armored vehicles and artillery, they were equipped as motorised infantry; the force even had a number of antiquated BTR-60 and BTR-70 armoured personnel carriers, as well as heavy support weapons.

At the end of 1997 the republic also began raising volunteer territorial militia. During the emergency, its ranks of reservists and volunteers almost reached 5,000. Their training and equipment were minimal, making them little more than a home guard force. However, their motivation to defend and recapture their homes as well as intimate knowledge of the terrain made them a reliable garrison force.

=== Insurgent forces ===
The insurgents proved to be a collection of Chechen, Dagestani and Arab guerrillas. Estimates of the insurgent forces' strength has been estimated of being 1,500-2,000 men. While mostly experienced veterans of the Chechen Wars and other wars, they were lightly equipped. They possessed ample supplies of small arms, support weapons, several 9M111 Fagot ATGMs, mortars and ample ammunition but they appeared to have only two BTR-60s, possibly captured from government forces in the first days of the attack, a single T-12 antitank gun and a few truck-mounted ZU-23 anti-aircraft guns to use as fire support.

Their first-among-equals leader was Shamil Basayev, Chechen rebel leader, erstwhile prime minister. Basayev's position was in many ways an ambiguous one. He was a staunch Muslim but didn't share the extreme Wahhabism of many of his allies; however, he strongly believed that Dagestan and Chechnya should be one state. Although a seasoned and wily guerrilla commander, this war saw him used as a political figurehead. His CPCD was officially charged with forming new "structures of Islamic self-government" in rebel-held areas. The brevity of the occupation and the opposition of many locals to their "liberation" meant that this was never a serious process.

Ibn al-Khattab's Islamic International Peacekeeping Brigade formed the core of the insurgent forces, accounting for perhaps half of the rebel fighters. Having fought against the Russians during the First Chechen War, he went on to wage an open campaign against President Maskhadov, whom he regarded as too close to Moscow. Khattab concluded a marriage of political convenience with Basayev, but in effect retained operational command and a veto on political direction.

The third element in the loose rebel triumvirate were the Dagestani Islamic militants. Besides Bagauddin Kebedov, the two key figures were Nadir Khachilayev and Siradjin Ramazanov. An ethnic Lak and former leader of the Union of Muslims in Russia, Khachilayev had a long pedigree of opposition to the local regime of Magomedali Magomedov. In 1998 he launched an abortive attempt to storm the government buildings in the Dagestani capital, Makhachkala. Khachilayev escaped to Chechnya where he found sanctuary with Islamist guerrilla movements, eventually forging an alliance with Khattab. Despite their Dagestani origins, he and the self-styled prime minister of 'Islamic Dagestan', Ramazanov, proved marginal, reflecting their failure to bring recruits to their side after they launched the operation. The self-proclaimed Shura of Dagestan welcomed the "liberation" and declared an Islamic state, but proved to have relatively little authority.

== Alleged agreement between Basayev and Russian authorities to start the war ==
The invasion of Dagestan leading to the start of the Second Chechen War was regarded by the Russian journalist Anna Politkovskaya as a provocation initiated from Moscow to start war in Chechnya, because Russian forces provided safe passage for Islamic fighters back to Chechnya.

According to Boris Berezovsky, the war was planned for six months before the Dagestan events, over his objections. Berezovsky confirmed that Movladi Udugov came to see him, but denied that he conspired with Udugov. However, according to Berezovsky "Udugov and Basayev conspired with Stepashin and Putin to provoke a war to topple Maskhadov..., but the Chechen condition was for the Russian army to stop at the Terek River. Instead, Putin double-crossed the Chechens and started an all-out war." In September 1999, transcripts of a number of alleged phone conversations conducted by Berezovsky with Udugov, Gaji Makhachev and other radical Chechens in June and July 1999 were published by Moskovskij Komsomolets newspaper.

It has also been reported that the head of the Russian presidential administration of Boris Yeltsin, Alexander Voloshin, paid money to Shamil Basayev to stage this military operation. In early August 1999, the investigative Russian journal Versiya published a report that Voloshin had met secretly with Basayev on 4 July 1999. The meeting was arranged by a retired officer of the GRU, Anton Surikov, and took place at a villa owned by the arms dealer Adnan Khashoggi between Nice and Monaco. Many of the participants of the meeting had fought on the same side during the Abkhazia-Georgia conflict during the early 1990s. According to Boris Kagarlitsky, those who arranged the meeting made one mistake; the security system blocked monitoring from the outside but provided perfect conditions for monitoring from the inside. French intelligence was able to listen in on everything that transpired. However, Ilyas Akhmadov believed that Basayev hadn't actually been in Nice. According to Akhmadov, Basayev was portrayed in shorts while Chechen men, especially fighters, do not wear shorts. Additional reasons not to take the story seriously were that Basayev had been a participant of a rally in Grozny on 3 July 1999, and that Akhmadov didn't know an instance when Basayev left the North Caucasus in the years after the First Chechen War. According to a press report cited by Timur Muzayev from the International Institute of Humanities and Political Research, speakers at the rally in Grozny on 3 July 1999 included Aslan Maskhadov, Shamil Basayev, and Ruslan Gelayev; these men and others called for reconciliation and unity.

Shamil Basayev allegedly worked for Russian GRU, at least prior to the Second Chechen War. According to Ilyas Akhmadov, who worked for Basayev's 1997 election campaign and accepted a Foreign Minister position in Maskhadov's government in 1999, allegations that Shamil Basayev was working for Russians should be viewed as an element of the political strife among Chechen leaders, as he criticized what he called "tangents about how Shamil was Russia's agent", noting that "Shamil equally strongly believed that Maskhadov's various calls for peace benefited only Russia".
