= Islamic Djamaat of Dagestan =

Islamist political entity in Russia

- Кадарская зона / Отдельная исламская территория
- Leaders: Bagaudtin Kebedov; Ibn al-Khattab
- Dates active: 1998 – 1999
- Headquarters: Kadar, Russia
- Active regions: Dagestan
- Ideology: Wahhabism; Islamic fundamentalism
- Wars: the War in Dagestan

The Islamic Djamaat of Dagestan, known in Russia as the Kadar zone (Russian: Кадарская зона), was an Islamist political entity in the Buynaksky District of Dagestan consisting of the fortified villages of Kadar, Karamakhi and Chabanmakhi. In the late 1990s, the Djamaat, heavily influenced by militant Wahhabism, declared independence and ejected Dagestani officials from the area. After a series of armed conflicts with Dagestani police and local moderate Muslims, the Djamaat broke off from government control. Sharia law was introduced in the villages, the Russian Constitution was declared void and an alliance was signed with Chechen forces with the aim of establishing an Independent Islamic Republic in the Caucasus.

Chechnya-based militants led by warlords Shamil Basayev and Ibn al-Khattab launched an armed invasion of Dagestan in the autumn of 1999. While the invasion was resisted by Dagestani civilians and Russian troops, a retributive military attack was launched against the Djamaat. In the ensuing fighting, the three villages were destroyed and the Djamaat's militants left the area on 15 September 1999.

== Background ==
=== Arrival of Wahhabism ===
The radical Wahhabist creed of Islam arrived to Dagestan from Tajikistan in the late 1980s. Its spread was substantially sponsored by wealthy Islamist supporters in Saudi Arabia. In the early 1990s, the Dagestani Wahhabists were led by Bagaudtin Kebedov, who had previously worked with Akhmed-Kadji Akhtaev in the Islamic Party of Revival, until falling out with the more moderate Akhtaev. During the First Chechen War, Bagaudtin traveled to Chechnya to organise Wahhabist militant cells. In Dagestan he became the Amir of Islamic Community of Dagestan. Bagaudtin was the spiritual father of the Dagestani Wahhabism.

=== Creation of the Djamaat ===
Bagaudtin Kebedov's teachings were put into practice in an area consisting of his home town Kadar, Karamakhi and Chabanmakhi in the Buinaksk District in central Dagestan southwest of the capital Makhachkala. This area became known as the Islamic Djamaat of Dagestan (a djamaat is traditional Dagestani political unit consisting of a village or group of villages). The majority of the villagers accepted the radical Wahhabist ideology, and young people from all over Dagestan and the Northern Caucasus arrived in the Djamaat in search of "pure Islam". While Bagaudtin was the spiritual leader of the djamaat, in military affairs the Arab warlord Ibn al-Khattab, who had lived in Karamakhi before travelling to Chechnya and married a local woman, was the most influential person.

== Conflicts around the Djamaat ==
The Islamic Djamaat of Dagestan started receiving public attention in the later half of the 1990s, after Wahhabist extremists from the Djamaat were involved in a series of violent conflicts with traditional Muslims and later—with the Dagestani government.

=== 1996–1997: Conflict with moderate Muslims ===
On 21 June 1996, the administrative head of Kadar was murdered. The villagers blamed local Wahhabists, and the suspects fled to Chechnya. The incident escalated the tensions between the traditional Muslims and Djamaat's Wahhabists. On 12 May 1997, an armed conflict involving more than 450 gunmen erupted between the traditionalists and the Wahhabists at a funeral in Chabanmakhi. The Wahhabists had demanded that the participants pray toward Mecca instead of toward the coffin, which was in violation of traditional practices. 2 people died until the firing stopped, possibly due to a rumour that an army of Wahhabists were about to arrive from Chechnya as reinforcements.

The Dagestani government responded by sending hundreds of policemen and Ministry of Interior OMON special forces troops to the region to prevent further conflict. Several high-ranking officials also arrived to the scene, including Deputy Prime Minister Said Amirov. They promised that the killers would be found and prosecuted.

==== Alliance with Chechen militants ====
In 1997, the Islamic Djamaat of Dagestan and Chechen separatists led by commander Salman Raduyev, signed an alliance with the stated goal of creating an independent Islamist state in the Caucasus. Raduyev had previously launched the deadly terrorist attack into the Dagestani town of Kizlyar. After signing the alliance, the Djamaat militants joined the International Islamic Battalion, consisting of Chechen and international Islamists led by Ibn Al-Khattab, to launch a raid against the Russian 136th Armoured Brigade in Gerlakh.

=== 1998: Conflict with Dagestani authorities ===
Tensions around the villages continued to escalate during 1998. On 21 May 1998, Wahhabist gunmen seized the police station of Karamakhi, beating two policemen and stealing weapons. Two days later, the Dagestani government responded by sending 100 Ministry of Interior troops to the area. Their aim was to take the road leading to Karamakhi, but an assault by hundreds of gunmen forced them to withdraw. The next day, on 24 May 1998, the Wahhabists deployed a small army from the villages Karamakhi, Chabanmakhi and Kadar. The militants were heavily armed, carrying grenade launchers, mortars and automatic weapons. Struggling to bring the situation under control, the Dagestani government entered negotiations with the militants. They reached an agreement according to which prisoners would be swapped and both sides would be separated. This essentially meant that the territory of the Islamic Djamaat was no longer under government control.

==== Declaration of independence ====
On 5 July 1998, a congress attended by 1,000 armed militants was held in Karamakhi resulted in the Djamaat declaring independence and demands for the resignation of the Dagestani government, withdrawal of all federal troops and a union with Chechnya. By 10 August, the militants were controlling roads and traffic through the area, threatening to separate Dagestan's capital Makhachkala from the west of the republic. Dagestani authorities now began extensive negotiations with the militants and started to seriously consider using military force against the villages.

On 1 September 1998, an agreement was signed between the Djamaat representatives and the government of Dagestan, in which the militants agreed to "live according to the constitution", and the government agreed to let Wahhabi leaders to enforce order in the villages. On 5 September, a terrorist attack took place in Makhachkala. Apartment buildings near to the homes of the Dagestani Prime Minister and Mayor of the capital were bombed and demolished; however, no group claimed responsibility. After this, relative calm was restored, but Dagestani and Russian influence in the republic diminished. The September 1998 agreement was in effect a capitulation of the central government in favour of the Djamaat's Islamist radicals.

== Description of the area ==
In August 1999, a researcher from the Moscow Institute of Oriental Studies visited the Islamic Djamaat. According to him, the road leading to Karamakhi was blocked by concrete structures and flanked by high-calibre machine guns. A sign warned that the traveler was about to enter independent Islamic territory. The militants stated they would not heed to the Russian Constitution, but follow only the Quran and Sunnah. Sharia law was the only law observed in the villages. The researcher was introduced to the militants' Taliban-styled training program. Its ideological part emphasized that "anyone who carried arms must do so in the name of Allah." The military training included practice in hand-to-hand combat, use of firearms including antiaircraft guns and mountain-combat tactics.

A Finnish journalist also travelled to Karamakhi in mid-August 1999, where he interviewed some villagers and their military Commander General Dzherollak. The journalist wrote: "The Wahhabists' trucks go all over Russia. Even one wrong move in Moscow or Makhachkala, they warn, will lead to bombs and bloodshed everywhere." According to the journalist the Wahhabis had told him, "if they start bombing us, we know where our bombs will explode."

== The War in Dagestan ==
On 17 April 1999, a congress headed by warlord Shamil Basayev was held in the Chechen capital Grozny. The Arab warlord Ibn al-Khattab was also present, along with several Chechen leaders. Basaev declared the formation of an Islamic army consisting of thousands of militants. According to Basaev, these forces were "necessary for the realization of the resolutions of the congress, the main purpose of which is the creation of the Independent Islamic State in the range of Chechnya and Dagestan." The troops had been trained in camps operated by Basaev, Khattab and the Wahhabist leader Bagaudtin Kebedov.

On 2 August 1999, Basaev and Khattab launched an armed invasion of Dagestan from their bases in Chechnya. Their force consisted of 2,000–3,000 militants, including Chechens and international Islamists. Basaev and Khattab had expected the Dagestani civilians to welcome them as "liberators"—however, this did not happen. Instead, the Dagestanis saw the invading force as unwelcome religious fanatics. Spontaneuous citizen militias were formed for the defence of their country. Together with Dagestani police, they managed to stop the invaders' advance. By 26 August, Basaev's and Khattab's force had withdrawn back to Chechnya.

On 29 August, Dagestani OMON troops launched a military retribution against the Islamic Djamaat of Dagestan. The Russian Air Force also bombed the area. The joined federal and Dagestani offensive was accepted by most Dagestani civilians, because the Wahhabists were widely seen as aligned with the Chechnya-base militants who had attacked civilian villages weeks before.

=== Terrorist bombings ===
While the fighting between the Wahhabists and Dagestani troops was ongoing on 4 September, the first attack of the Russian apartment bombings occurred; 64 people were killed in a blast that destroyed an apartment building in the nearby city of Buynaksk.

A day after the blast on 5 September, Basayev and Khattab launched a second incursion into Dagestan, ostensibly with the aim of relieving the Islamic Djamaat from the government attack. On 9 September, 94 Russian civilians were killed when an explosion destroyed their apartment building in Moscow. More terrorist attacks followed: on 13 September, 118 people died in a bombing in Moscow; on 16 September, a truck-bomb destroyed an apartment building in Volgodonsk.

According to Robert Bruce Ware, a leading specialist on Dagestan, the apartment bombings were likely perpetrated by the Dagestani Wahhabists as a retribution for the federal attack on the Islamic Djamaat.

== Destruction of the Djamaat ==
Following the federal military attack which started on 29 August 1999, the militants retreated from the Djamaat on 13 September 1999. The villages of Karamakhi, Chabanmakhi and Kadar were ruined in the fighting. As a physical geographic entity, the Islamic Djamaat of Dagestan finally ceased to exist, but the Dagestani Wahhabists continued to have a serious presence in the republic, and there is much evidence that they have been responsible for a long series of terrorist bombings in Dagestan.

== See also ==
- Vilayat Dagestan
- Caucasus Emirate

== Sources ==
- Ware, Robert Bruce; Kisriev, Enver (2010). Dagestan – Russian Hegemony and Islamic Resistance in the North Caucasus. M.E.Sharpe. ISBN 978-0-7656-2028-6.
- Ruslan Kurbanov Globalization of Muslim consciousness in the Caucasus: Islamic call and jihad. Central Asia and the Caucasus 2006 Issue no. 6. pp. 55–70
- Souleimanov, Emil (December 2005). "Chechnya, Wahhabism and the Invasion of Dagestan". Middle East Review of International Affairs. 9 (4). Archived from the original on 2011-05-31.
- Reddaway, Peter; Glinski, Dmitri (2001), The Tragedy of Russia's Reforms: Market Bolshevism Against Democracy, United States Institute of Peace Press, ISBN 1-929223-06-4
- Holland, Edward. "Ethnic Composition, Radical Islam, and Challenges to the Stability in the Republic of Dagestan" (PDF). University of Colorado.
- Roschin, Mikhail (October 2000). "Dagestan and the War Next Door". Perspective. 11 (1). Boston University. Archived from the original on June 25, 2011.
