= Khvayni =

Khvayni Хвайни
- Selo
- Location within Republic of Dagestan Location within Russia
- Coordinates: 42°24′N 45°58′E
- Country: Russia
- Region: Republic of Dagestan
- District: Tsumadinsky District
- Time zone: UTC+3:00

Khvayni (Russian: Хвайни) is a rural locality (a selo) in Tsumadinsky District, Republic of Dagestan, Russia. Population: 249 (2021 census); 114 (2002 census); 102 (1989 Soviet census). There are 2 streets in this selo.

== Geography ==
Selo is located 19 km from Agvali (the district's administrative centre), 140 km from Makhachkala (capital of Dagestan) and 1,634 km from Moscow. Echeda is the nearest rural locality.
