= Verkhneye Gakvari =

Verkhneye Gakvari Верхнее Гаквари
- Selo
- Location within Republic of Dagestan Location within Russia
- Coordinates: 42°32′N 46°01′E
- Country: Russia
- Region: Republic of Dagestan
- District: Tsumadinsky District
- Time zone: UTC+3:00

Verkhneye Gakvari (Russian: Верхнее Гаквари) is a rural locality (a selo) in Tsumadinsky District, Republic of Dagestan, Russia. Population: 469 (2021 census); 348 (2002 census); 369 (1989 Soviet census). There are 6 streets in this selo.

== Geography ==
Selo is located 7 km from Agvali (the district's administrative centre), 129 km from Makhachkala (capital of Dagestan) and 1,622 km from Moscow. Nizhniye Gakvari is the nearest rural locality.
