= Gachitli =

Gachitli Гачитли
- Selo
- Location within Republic of Dagestan Location within Russia
- Coordinates: 42°33′N 46°05′E
- Country: Russia
- Region: Republic of Dagestan
- District: Tsumadinsky District
- Time zone: UTC+3:00

Gachitli (Russian: Гачитли) is a rural locality (a selo) in Tsumadinsky District, Republic of Dagestan, Russia. Population: 115 (2021 census); 131 (2002 census); 93 (1989 Soviet census). There is 1 street in this selo.

== Geography ==
Selo is located 3 km from Agvali (the district's administrative centre), 124 km from Makhachkala (capital of Dagestan) and 1,624 km from Moscow. Gigikh is the nearest rural locality.
