= Santlada =

Santlada Сантлада
- Selo
- Location within Republic of Dagestan Location within Russia
- Coordinates: 42°23′N 46°04′E
- Country: Russia
- Region: Republic of Dagestan
- District: Tsumadinsky District
- Time zone: UTC+3:00

Santlada (Russian: Сантлада) is a rural locality (a selo) in Tsumadinsky District, Republic of Dagestan, Russia. Population: 215 (2021 census); 136 (2002 census); 91 (1989 Soviet census). There are 3 streets in this selo.

== Geography ==
Selo is located 18 km from Agvali (the district's administrative centre), 134 km from Makhachkala (capital of Dagestan) and 1,641 km from Moscow. Kvantlada is the nearest rural locality.
