= Tissi, Republic of Dagestan =

Tissi Тисси
- Selo
- Location within Republic of Dagestan Location within Russia
- Coordinates: 42°29′N 46°08′E
- Country: Russia
- Region: Republic of Dagestan
- District: Tsumadinsky District
- Time zone: UTC+3:00

Tissi (Russian: Тисси) is a rural locality (a selo) in Tsumadinsky District, Republic of Dagestan, Russia. Population: 662 (2021 census); 447 (2002 census); 292 (1989 Soviet census). There are 3 streets in this selo.

== Geography ==
Selo is located 6 km from Agvali (the district's administrative centre), 123 km from Makhachkala (capital of Dagestan) and 1,632 km from Moscow. Sanukh is the nearest rural locality.
