= Inkhokvari =

Inkhokvari Инхоквари
- Selo
- Location within Republic of Dagestan Location within Russia
- Coordinates: 42°24′N 46°02′E
- Country: Russia
- Region: Republic of Dagestan
- District: Tsumadinsky District
- Time zone: UTC+3:00

Inkhokvari (Russian: Инхоквари) is a rural locality (a selo) in Tsumadinsky District, Republic of Dagestan, Russia. Population: 303 (2021 census); 222 (2002 census); 171 (1989 Soviet census). There are 5 streets in this selo.

== Geography ==
Selo is located 16 km from Agvali (the district's administrative centre), 134 km from Makhachkala (capital of Dagestan) and 1,637 km from Moscow. Kvantlada is the nearest rural locality.
