= Gigatli-Urukh =

Gigatli-Urukh Гигатли-Урух
- Selo
- Location within Republic of Dagestan Location within Russia
- Coordinates: 42°35′N 46°08′E
- Country: Russia
- Region: Republic of Dagestan
- District: Tsumadinsky District
- Time zone: UTC+3:00

Gigatli-Urukh (Russian: Гигатли-Урух) is a rural locality (a selo) in Tsumadinsky District, Republic of Dagestan, Russia. Population: 253 (2021 census); 316 (2002 census); 242 (1989 Soviet census). There are 4 streets in this selo.

== Geography ==
Selo is located 6 km from Agvali (the district's administrative centre), 118 km from Makhachkala (capital of Dagestan) and 1,622 km from Moscow. Gigatl is the nearest rural locality.
