= Sasitli =

Sasitli Саситли
- Selo
- Location within Republic of Dagestan Location within Russia
- Coordinates: 42°29′N 45°59′E
- Country: Russia
- Region: Republic of Dagestan
- District: Tsumadinsky District

Population (2021)
  - Total: 200
- Time zone: UTC+3:00

Sasitli (Russian: Саситли) is a rural locality (a selo) in Tsumadinsky District, Republic of Dagestan, Russia. Population: 364 (2021 census); 323 (2002 census); 310 (1989 Soviet census). There are 2 streets in this selo.

== Geography ==
Sasitli is located in the North Caucasus region, a subregion of Eastern Europe under Russian governance. This area constitutes the northern part of the wider Caucasus region, which separates Europe and Asia.

This selo is located 25 km from Agvali (the district's administrative centre), 191 km from Makhachkala (capital of Dagestan) and 2,008 km from Moscow.
