= Gadaychi =

Gadaychi Гадайчи
- Selo
- Location within Republic of Dagestan Location within Russia
- Coordinates: 42°28′N 46°04′E
- Country: Russia
- Region: Republic of Dagestan
- District: Tsumadinsky District
- Time zone: UTC+3:00

Gadaychi (Russian: Гадайчи) is a rural locality (a selo) in Tsumadinsky District, Republic of Dagestan, Russia. Population: 133 (2021 census); 118 (2002 census); 101 (1989 Soviet census). There are 2 streets in this selo.

== Geography ==
Selo is located 9 km from Agvali (the district's administrative centre), 129 km from Makhachkala (capital of Dagestan) and 1,632 km from Moscow. Tsumada-Urukh is the nearest rural locality.
