= Khalikh =

Khalikh Халих
- Selo
- Location within Republic of Dagestan Location within Russia
- Coordinates: 42°29′N 46°05′E
- Country: Russia
- Region: Republic of Dagestan
- District: Tsumadinsky District
- Time zone: UTC+3:00

Khalikh (Russian: Халих) is a rural locality (a selo) in Tsumadinsky District, Republic of Dagestan, Russia. Population: 44 (2021 census); 44 (2002 census); 31 (1989 Soviet census). There is 1 street in this selo.

== Geography ==
Selo is located 7 km from Agvali (the district's administrative centre), 127 km from Makhachkala (capital of Dagestan) and 1,631 km from Moscow. Tissi-Akhitli is the nearest rural locality.
