= Tsidatl =

Tsidatl Цидатль
- Selo
- Location within Republic of Dagestan Location within Russia
- Coordinates: 42°27′N 46°02′E
- Country: Russia
- Region: Republic of Dagestan
- District: Tsumadinsky District
- Time zone: UTC+3:00

Tsidatl (Russian: Цидатль) is a rural locality (a selo) in Tsumadinsky District, Republic of Dagestan, Russia. Population: 261 (2021 census); 123 (2002 census); 205 (1989 Soviet census). There are 2 streets in this selo.

== Geography ==
Selo is located 6 km from Agvali (the district's administrative centre), 128 km from Makhachkala (capital of Dagestan) and 1,626 km from Moscow. Tsuydi is the nearest rural locality.
