= Batlakhatli =

Batlakhatli Батлахатли
- Selo
- Location within Republic of Dagestan Location within Russia
- Coordinates: 42°35′N 46°03′E
- Country: Russia
- Region: Republic of Dagestan
- District: Tsumadinsky District
- Time zone: UTC+3:00

Batlakhatli (Russian: Батлахатли) is a rural locality (a selo) in Tsumadinsky District, Republic of Dagestan, Russia. Population: 8 (2021 census); 12 (2002 census); 68 (1989 Soviet census). There is 1 street in this selo.

== Geography ==
Selo is located 7 km from Agvali (the district's administrative centre), 125 km from Makhachkala (capital of Dagestan) and 1,620 km from Moscow. Gadiri is the nearest rural locality.
