= Khvarshi, Republic of Dagestan =

Khvarshi Хварши
- Selo
- Location within Republic of Dagestan Location within Russia
- Coordinates: 42°21′N 46°06′E
- Country: Russia
- Region: Republic of Dagestan
- District: Tsumadinsky District
- Time zone: UTC+3:00

Khvarshi (Russian: Хварши) is a rural locality (a selo) in Tsumadinsky District, Republic of Dagestan, Russia. Population: 147 (2021 census); 175 (2002 census); 153 (1989 Soviet census). There is 1 street in this selo.

== Geography ==
Selo is located 21 km from Agvali (the district's administrative centre), 133 km from Makhachkala (capital of Dagestan) and 1,645 km from Moscow. Khonokh is the nearest rural locality.
