= Richaganikh =

Richaganikh Ричаганих
- Selo
- Location within Republic of Dagestan Location within Russia
- Coordinates: 42°29′N 46°03′E
- Country: Russia
- Region: Republic of Dagestan
- District: Tsumadinsky District
- Time zone: UTC+3:00

Richaganikh (Russian: Ричаганих) is a rural locality (a selo) in Tsumadinsky District, Republic of Dagestan, Russia. Population: 238 (2021 census); 224 (2002 census); 139 (1989 Soviet census). There are 5 streets in this selo.

== Geography ==
Selo is located 7 km from Agvali (the district's administrative centre), 129 km from Makhachkala (capital of Dagestan) and 1,628 km from Moscow. Issi is the nearest rural locality.
