= Mukharkh =

Mukharkh Мухарх
- Selo
- Location within Republic of Dagestan Location within Russia
- Coordinates: 42°27′N 46°09′E
- Country: Russia
- Region: Republic of Dagestan
- District: Tsumadinsky District
- Time zone: UTC+3:00

Mukharkh (Russian: Мухарх) is a rural locality (a khutor) in Tsumadinsky District, Republic of Dagestan, Russia. Population: 47 (2021 census); 31 (2002 census); 43 (1989 Soviet census). There is 1 street in this khutor.

== Geography ==
Khutor is located 9 km from Agvali (the district's administrative centre), 124 km from Makhachkala (capital of Dagestan) and 1,636 km from Moscow. Gvinachi is the nearest rural locality.
