= Shava, Tsumadinsky District, Republic of Dagestan =

Shava Шава
- Selo
- Location within Republic of Dagestan Location within Russia
- Coordinates: 43°43′N 47°01′E
- Country: Russia
- Region: Republic of Dagestan
- District: Tsumadinsky District
- Time zone: UTC+3:00

Shava (Russian: Шава) is a rural locality (a selo) in Tsumadinsky District, Republic of Dagestan, Russia. Population: 1,445 (2021 census); 516 (2002 census); 336 (1989 Soviet census).

== Geography ==
Selo is located 150 km from Agvali (the district's administrative centre), 91 km from Makhachkala (capital of Dagestan) and 1,537 km from Moscow. Inko is the nearest rural locality.
