= Tissi-Akhitli =

Tissi-Akhitli Тисси-Ахитли
- Selo
- Location within Republic of Dagestan Location within Russia
- Coordinates: 42°30′N 46°06′E
- Country: Russia
- Region: Republic of Dagestan
- District: Tsumadinsky District
- Time zone: UTC+3:00

Tissi-Akhitli (Russian: Тисси-Ахитли) is a rural locality (a selo) in Tsumadinsky District, Republic of Dagestan, Russia. Population: 573 (2021 census); 503 (2002 census); 282 (1989 Soviet census). There are 5 streets in this selo.

== Geography ==
Selo is located 5 km from Agvali (the district's administrative centre), 125 km from Makhachkala (capital of Dagestan) and 1,630 km from Moscow. Khalikh is the nearest rural locality.
