= Kochali =

Kochali Кочали
- Selo
- Location within Republic of Dagestan Location within Russia
- Coordinates: 42°31′N 46°06′E
- Country: Russia
- Region: Republic of Dagestan
- District: Tsumadinsky District
- Time zone: UTC+3:00

Kochali (Russian: Кочали) is a rural locality (a selo) in Tsumadinsky District, Republic of Dagestan, Russia. Population: 833 (2021 census); 584 (2002 census); 227 (1989 Soviet census). There are 7 streets in this selo.

== Geography ==
Selo is located 2 km from Agvali (the district's administrative centre), 123 km from Makhachkala (capital of Dagestan) and 1,627 km from Moscow. Gigikh is the nearest rural locality.
