= Khushet =

Khushet Хушет
- Selo
- Location within Republic of Dagestan Location within Russia
- Coordinates: 42°23′N 45°46′E
- Country: Russia
- Region: Republic of Dagestan
- District: Tsumadinsky District
- Time zone: UTC+3:00

Khushet (Russian: Хушет) is a rural locality (a selo) in Tsumadinsky District, Republic of Dagestan, Russia. Population: 969 (2021 census); 767 (2002 census); 421 (1989 Soviet census). There are 4 streets in this selo.

== Geography ==
Selo is located 33 km from Agvali (the district's administrative centre), 155 km from Makhachkala (capital of Dagestan) and 1,629 km from Moscow. Tsykhalakh is the nearest rural locality.
