= Gigatl =

Gigatl Гигатль
- Selo
- Location within Republic of Dagestan Location within Russia
- Coordinates: 42°34′N 46°05′E
- Country: Russia
- Region: Republic of Dagestan
- District: Tsumadinsky District
- Time zone: UTC+3:00

Gigatl (Russian: Гигатль) is a rural locality (a selo) in Tsumadinsky District, Republic of Dagestan, Russia. Population: 1,421 (2021 census); 1,264 (2002 census); 1,129 (1989 Soviet census). There are 10 streets in this selo.

== Geography ==
Selo is located 5 km from Agvali (the district's administrative centre), 122 km from Makhachkala (capital of Dagestan) and 1,621 km from Moscow. Gadiri is the nearest rural locality.
