= Gvinachi =

Gvinachi Гвиначи
- Selo
- Location within Republic of Dagestan Location within Russia
- Coordinates: 42°27′N 46°09′E
- Country: Russia
- Region: Republic of Dagestan
- District: Tsumadinsky District
- Time zone: UTC+3:00

Gvinachi (Russian: Гвиначи) is a rural locality (a selo) in Tsumadinsky District, Republic of Dagestan, Russia. Population: 63 (2021 census); 71 (2002 census); 82 (1989 Soviet census).

== Geography ==
Selo is located 10 km from Agvali (the district's administrative centre), 123 km from Makhachkala (capital of Dagestan) and 1,636 km from Moscow. Mukharkh is the nearest rural locality.
