= Tlenkhori =

Tlenkhori Тленхори
- Khutor
- Location within Republic of Dagestan Location within Russia
- Coordinates: 42°32′N 46°07′E
- Country: Russia
- Region: Republic of Dagestan
- District: Tsumadinsky District
- Time zone: UTC+3:00

Tlenkhori (Russian: Тленхори) is a rural locality (a khutor) in Tsumadinsky District, Republic of Dagestan, Russia. Population: 643 (2021 census); 246 (2002 census); 99 (1989 Soviet census). There are 3 streets in this khutor.

== Geography ==
Khutor is located 2 km from Agvali (the district's administrative centre), 169 km from Makhachkala (capital of Dagestan) and 1,985 km from Moscow.
