= Sergey Stvolov =

Russian military officer

Sergei Stvolov
- Nickname: Antaeus
- Born: 9 March 1964; Pervouralsk, Sverdlovsk Oblast, Russia
- Died: 14 October 2001 (aged 37) Vladikavkaz, North Ossetia–Alania, Russia
- Buried: Talitsky cemetery
- Allegiance: Red Army (1986–1991); Russian Armed Forces (1991–2001)
- Branch: Soviet Army; Russian Ground Forces
- Service years: 1986–2001
- Rank: Lieutenant Colonel
- Commands: 503rd Motor Rifle Regiment
- Conflicts: Soviet–Afghan War; First Chechen War; Second Chechen War; First Nagorno-Karabakh War; Transnistria War; Tajikistani Civil War
- Awards: Hero of the Russian Federation; Order of Courage

Sergey Nikolaevich Stvolov (Russian: Серге́й Никола́евич Стволов; 9 March 1964 – 14 October 2001) was a Soviet–Russian military officer, and lieutenant colonel of the Russian Armed Forces. He participated in the Soviet–Afghan War, First and Second Chechen Wars, First Nagorno-Karabakh War, Transnistria War, Tajikistani Civil War, and the insurgency in the North Caucasus. Having commanded the 503rd Motor Rifle Regiment of the 19th Motor Rifle Division of the 58th Combined Arms Army of the North Caucasian Military District, he was awarded the Hero of the Russian Federation in 2000.

== Life and service ==
Stvolov was born on 9 March 1964 in Sverdlovsk Oblast. In 1982, he graduated from the local secondary school and entered the Red Army.

From 1985, he served in the 44th Training Airborne Division in Jonava, Lithuanian SSR. He graduated from the Sverdlovsk Higher Military-Political Tank-Artillery School in 1986, and entered service in the airborne, tank and motorized rifle units of various military districts, including the Turkestan Military District. From 1987 to 1989, he fought in the Soviet–Afghan War as part of the 103rd Guards Airborne Division. Stvolov then participated in the localization of interethnic armed conflicts of the First Nagorno-Karabakh War, Transnistria War, and the Tajikistani Civil War. As a battalion commander, he fought in the First Chechen War, and was awarded the Order of Courage three times. Stvolov was seriously wounded during the Battle of Grozny in January 1995. He was hospitalized, but then escaped from the hospital to return to the battle.

In 1999, he graduated from the Combined Arms Academy, and in September of the same year, Stvolov fought in Dagestan as commander of the 503rd Motor Rifle Regiment. He led regiment during the battles in Karamakhi, Chabanmakhi, Ishcherskaya, and Grozny. He was wounded 4 times during the war. In subsequent engagements, Stvolov served as chief of staff of the West military group and deputy commander of the 205th Motor Rifle Brigade. In March 2000, Stvolov took part in the assault on Komsomolskoye. By the decree of the President of Russia on 9 September 2000, Sergei Stvolov was awarded the title of Hero of the Russian Federation with the Golden Star medal for his activities during the Chechen Wars.

On 14 October 2001, Sergei Stvolov died in a car accident near Vladikavkaz, North Ossetia–Alania in Russia. He was buried in Pervouralsk at the Talitsky cemetery.

== See also ==
- List of Heroes of the Russian Federation
