= Kadi Abakarov =

Soviet Avar sergeant (1913–1948)

Kadi Abakarovich Abakarov
- Кади Абакарович Абакаров
- Born: May 9, 1913; Echeda, Dagestan Oblast, Russian Empire
- Died: February 29, 1948 (aged 34); Agvali, Dagestan ASSR, Soviet Union
- Military career
- Allegiance: Soviet Union
- Branch: Red Army
- Service years: 1942–1945
- Rank: Sergeant
- Unit: 301st Rifle Division
- Conflicts: World War II; Battle of the Seelow Heights
- Awards: Hero of the Soviet Union

Kadi Abakarovich Abakarov (Russian: Кади Абакарович Абакаров) (9 May 1913 – 29 February 1948) was an Avar Red Army sergeant who fought during World War II. Abakarov was awarded the title Hero of the Soviet Union for actions in the Battle of the Seelow Heights.

== Early life ==
Kadi Abakarov was born on 9 May 1913 in the village of Echeda in Dagestan Oblast to a family of peasants. Abakarov received primary education. His father died when he was young. After the end of his education, Abakarov worked on a collective farm.

== World War II ==
In February 1942, Abakarov was drafted into the Red Army. His first combat action was on the Terek River in the North Caucasian Front. In 1944, he joined the Communist Party of the Soviet Union. During the crossing of the Dniester in the First Jassy–Kishinev Offensive, Abakarov was reportedly among the first to help create the bridgehead. On 14 August, he was awarded the Medal "For Courage". Abakarov was awarded the Medal "For Courage" again on 28 October 1944. He was awarded the Order of the Red Banner on 31 March 1945 for actions in the Vistula–Oder Offensive. He was a squad leader in the 8th Rifle Company of the 301st Rifle Division's 1054th Rifle Regiment by April. On 17 April 1945, he fought in the Battle of the Seelow Heights. During an attempt to capture the Verbig railway station, Abakarov organized resistance to German counterattacks. His squad reportedly destroyed seven tanks and two assault guns; he is said to have personally destroyed five tanks and an assault gun. On 15 May 1946, Abakarov was awarded the title Hero of the Soviet Union and the Order of Lenin for his actions during the Battle of the Seelow Heights.

== Postwar ==
At the end of 1945, Abakarov was demobilized. He initially worked in the Agua village high school in the Tsumadinsky District, but later was in charge of the regional sales department of the local savings bank. Abakarov fell ill with tuberculosis and died on 29 February 1948.
