= Aknada, Tsumadinsky District, Republic of Dagestan =

Aknada Акнада
- Selo
- Location within Republic of Dagestan Location within Russia
- Coordinates: 42°24′N 46°10′E
- Country: Russia
- Region: Republic of Dagestan
- District: Tsumadinsky District
- Time zone: UTC+3:00

Aknada (Russian: Акнада) is a rural locality (a selo) in Tsumadinsky District, Republic of Dagestan, Russia. Population: 47 (2021 census); 49 (2002 census); 42 (1989 Soviet census). There is 1 street in this selo.

== Geography ==
Selo is located 16 km from Agvali (the district's administrative centre), 126 km from Makhachkala (capital of Dagestan) and 1,642 km from Moscow. Gunduchi is the nearest rural locality.
