= Tenla =

Tenla Тенла
- Khutor
- Location within Republic of Dagestan Location within Russia
- Coordinates: 42°27′N 46°07′E
- Country: Russia
- Region: Republic of Dagestan
- District: Tsumadinsky District
- Time zone: UTC+3:00

Tenla (Russian: Тенла) is a rural locality (a khutor) in Tsumadinsky District, Republic of Dagestan, Russia. Population: 41 (2021 census); 73 (2002 census); 100 (1989 Soviet census). There is 1 street in this khutor.

== Geography ==
Khutor is located 8 km from Agvali (the district's administrative centre), 125 km from Makhachkala (capital of Dagestan) and 1,634 km from Moscow. Sanukh is the nearest rural locality.
