= Tsumada-Urukh =

Tsumada-Urukh Цумада-Урух
- Selo
- Location within Republic of Dagestan Location within Russia
- Coordinates: 42°28′N 46°03′E
- Country: Russia
- Region: Republic of Dagestan
- District: Tsumadinsky District
- Time zone: UTC+3:00

Tsumada-Urukh (Russian: Цумада-Урух) is a rural locality (a selo) in Tsumadinsky District, Republic of Dagestan, Russia. Population: 249 (2021 census); 151 (2002 census); 102 (1989 Soviet census). There are 3 streets in this selo.

== Geography ==
Selo is located 9 km from Agvali (the district's administrative centre), 130 km from Makhachkala (capital of Dagestan) and 1,631 km from Moscow. Gadaychi is the nearest rural locality.
