= Khonokh =

Khonokh Хонох
- Selo
- Location within Republic of Dagestan Location within Russia
- Coordinates: 42°20′N 46°07′E
- Country: Russia
- Region: Republic of Dagestan
- District: Tsumadinsky District
- Time zone: UTC+3:00

Khonokh (Russian: Хонох) is a rural locality (a selo) in Tsumadinsky District, Republic of Dagestan, Russia. Population: 580 (2010 census); 287 (2002 census); 187 (1989 Soviet census). There are 2 streets in this selo.

== Geography ==
Selo is located 23 km from Agvali (the district's administrative centre), 133 km from Makhachkala (capital of Dagestan) and 1,648 km from Moscow. Khvarshi is the nearest rural locality.
