= Tando (disambiguation) =

Tando is a village in Dagestan, Russia.

Tando may also refer to:

- Tando Adam Khan, a human settlement in Sindh, Pakistan
- Tando Muhammad Khan District, a district of Pakistan
- Tando Allahyar, a city situated in Pakistan
- Tando Allahyar District, an administrative unit of Sindh, Pakistan
- Tando Allahyar railway station, a railway station in Pakistan
- Tando Velaphi (born 1987), an Australian association football goalkeeper

== See also ==
- Thando, a personal name
- Tandora County, a division in New South Wales
