= 205th Separate Guards Motor Rifle Brigade =

Russian Ground Forces unit

205th Guards Cossack Motor Rifle Brigade
- 205-я гвардейская мотострелковая казачья бригада
- Shoulder sleeve patch
- Active: 1995–present
- Country: Russia
- Branch: Russian Ground Forces
- Type: Mechanized infantry
- Size: Brigade
- Part of: 49th Combined Arms Army
- Garrison/HQ: Budyonnovsk
- Mottos: Мы вернёмся даже с ада — 205-я бригада! (Coming back even from Hell is 205th brigade)
- Anniversaries: 2 May (formation)
- Engagements: First Chechen War; War of Dagestan; Second Chechen War; Russo-Georgian War; Russo-Ukrainian War
- Honorifics: Cossack; Guards

Commanders
- Current commander: Colonel Eduard Shandura

Insignia
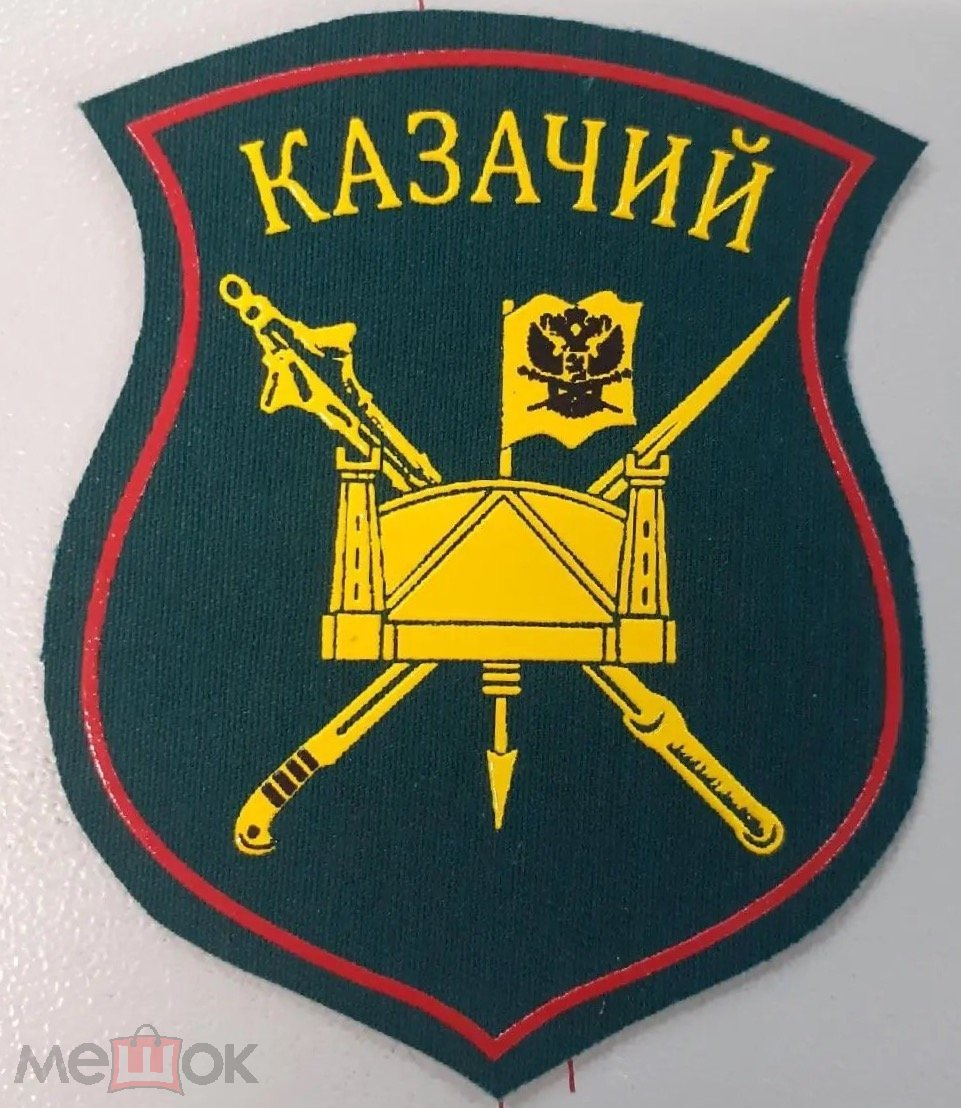
- Early brigade sleeve insignia

The 205th Guards Cossack Motor Rifle Brigade (205 omsbr) (Russian: 205-я гвардейская мотострелковая казачья бригада (205 омсбр); Military Unit Number 74814) is a mechanized infantry brigade of the Russian Ground Forces. Part of the 49th Combined Arms Army, the brigade is based in Budyonnovsk, Stavropol Krai.

Formed in 1995 during the First Chechen War, the brigade has since fought in most Russian post-Soviet conflicts, including the War of Dagestan, Second Chechen War, the Russo-Georgian War, and the Russo-Ukrainian War.

== History ==
=== First Chechen War ===
The 205th Separate Motor Rifle Brigade was formed by 1 May 1995 (although it marks its anniversary on 2 May) in accordance with a 17 March Minister of Defense directive during the First Chechen War. The brigade was formed in recently captured Grozny from battalions and companies drawn from the 167th Separate Motor Rifle Brigade, deployed from Chebarkul, the 131st Separate Motor Rifle Brigade from Maykop, and the 723rd Guards Motor Rifle Regiment of the 16th Guards Tank Division from Chaykovsky. The brigade was planned to be based in Grozny and Shali as part of a permanent Russian military presence in Chechnya, but was continuously engaged in the war from the beginning of its existence. The brigade included the 1387th, 1393rd, 1394th, and 1396th Separate Motor Rifle Battalions, 29th Separate Tank Battalion, 327th Separate Rocket Artillery Battalion, 321st Separate Self-Propelled Howitzer Artillery Battalion, 346th Separate Anti-Aircraft Missile Artillery Battalion, 1398th Separate Reconnaissance Battalion. The 147th Separate Electronic Warfare Company was formed as part of the brigade by 1 April 1996, and the 93rd Separate Engineer-Sapper Battalion and 584th Separate Spetsnaz Company followed by 25 May. The 204th Separate Guards Motor Rifle Regiment was also formed as part of the brigade by 25 May, and included the 395th, 396th, and 427th Separate Motor Rifle Battalions in addition to the 435th Separate Self-Propelled Artillery Battalion. The 204th was first stationed at Khankala with the objective of later deploying to Shali. A proposal was made to reorganize the brigade to consist of two motor rifle regiments, the reconnaissance battalion, and the Spetsnaz company in May 1996, but this was not implemented due to being considered too cumbersome for the counterinsurgency war.

During the war, the personnel of the brigade served at outposts and roadblocks, guarded important facilities, and often operated in conjunction with the Internal Troops in the suppression of Chechen resistance. Brigade political officer Vyacheslav Izmailov, interviewed twenty years later, described his unit and the army in general as an "ill-trained rabble" only capable of "filling Chechnya with corpses" in a conflict that was "not a war, but banditry on both sides." He recalled one incident in which more conscripts were sent to the unit than they had food supplies for, which resulted in them being sent back to Russia when the Khankala battalion commander found that his replacements were malnourished to the extent that they could not walk to the canteen on their own. Indicative of the brigade's reputation was its wartime nickname Two Hundred Drunk (Двести пьяная), a play on the similarity of the Russian word for drunk and the word for fifth from its designation. Elements of the 205th participated in the 7 January 1996 operation to free hostages and eliminate the fighters in the village of Pervomayskoye during the Kizlyar–Pervomayskoye hostage crisis. The brigade was further engaged in the elimination of militants in Grozny following a three-day siege of the Russian troops in March, and in the operations around the village of Shalazhi and Komsomolskoye in July.

The 205th Brigade played a major role in the August Battle of Grozny, beginning with the formation of three assault detachments to retake the city after militants occupied positions in the capital on 6 August. The detachments were commanded, respectively, by reconnaissance battalion commander Captain Stanislav Kravtsov, 3rd motor rifle battalion commander Lieutenant Colonel A. Skantsev, and his deputy Major I. Sklyarenko. The brigade received orders on the night of 7–8 August to break the encirclement of the government quarter in the city center using the assault detachments. The reconnaissance battalion led the advance, but ran into organized Chechen positions and was forced to retreat to its original positions with two killed and one wounded. Regrouping, the battalion advanced along a new route but was ambushed again. Dismounting, they engaged the Chechens but lost Kravtsov and six soldiers to a mine explosion. Kravtsov was posthumously made a Hero of the Russian Federation, but he was in fact killed by friendly fire according to Izmailov, who was with the reconnaissance battalion at the time. Meanwhile, Skantsev's detachment moved on the government buildings on Bogdan Khmelnitsky street. When the motorized riflemen approached the intersection with Mayakovsky street, they came under RPG and small arms fire. A fierce battle ensured, in which Skantsev was killed by a sniper. The dead battalion commanders were replaced by brigade chief of staff Lieutenant Colonel Nikolay Butko and operations directorate officer Lieutenant Colonel Anatoly Kabakov, and the assault groups broke through into the government quarter, where they took up an all-round defense. During the battle for Grozny, the 1st motor rifle battalion lost thirteen killed and 65 wounded, while the separate tank battalion lost three officers and three contract servicemen, while five more servicemen were reported missing.

=== Withdrawal from Chechnya, War in Dagestan and Second Chechen War ===
After the signing of the Khasavyurt Accord ended the war, the brigade was withdrawn from Chechnya in accordance with a 23 November 1996 presidential decree of Boris Yeltsin. Budyonnovsk, near the Chechen border, was chosen as the new base of the brigade, and in accordance with a Minister of Defense directive of 4 December 1996 the brigade was relocated there by 20 January 1997. In early December 1996 there was already an operational group under the brigade commander and a separate anti-aircraft missile battalion. The artillery battalion and signals units were railed to the base on 9 December, and the withdrawal of the brigade was completed on 31 December. Meanwhile, the 204th Guards Motor Rifle Regiment was relocated to Buynaksk in Dagestan, where it was disbanded and its personnel merged with the 136th Separate Motor Rifle Brigade to form the 136th Separate Guards Motor Rifle Brigade. During the First Chechen War, more than 400 brigade personnel were decorated.

At Budyonnovsk, the brigade found itself without barracks and had to live in tents pitched in empty fields. The demoralized soldiers of the brigade developed a reputation for drunkenness among the locals and suffered from inadequate food supplies. Visiting journalists found rampant corruption, with leave requests being based on bribery, and general indiscipline. Discipline was enforced harshly, with one battalion commander locking habitually absent without leave soldiers in a dryer room and personally administering beatings, and another using soldiers as unpaid labor to harvest crops on a local farm. By May 1999 the situation in the brigade had been improved with new officers and the discharge of most contract servicemen who had fought in the First Chechen War, and the completion of the barracks. The military justice system began to enforce discipline, with criminal cases for hazing, incitement to suicide, theft, and weapons selling, and punished the officers who had employed illegal disciplinary methods.

The brigade received the Cossack honorific on 23 September 1998, and four of its battalions were given honorifics honoring the Don (1387th), Kuban (1393rd), Terek (1394th), and Astrakhan Cossacks (28th Separate Tank Battalion). The brigade established close relationships with the local Registered Cossacks and by the early 2000s, more than 1,350 registered Cossacks served in the brigade. The brigade continues to maintain its Cossack ties, with representatives of the Terek Cossacks being present at its ceremonies.

During the War of Dagestan, the brigade participated in the elimination of Chechen fighters in the villages of Botlikh and Karamakhi during August and September 1999. In response to the Chechen militants' incursion into Dagestan, Russian forces moved into Chechnya, beginning the Second Chechen War. The brigade fought in the capture of the villages of Ishcherskaya and then Znamenskoye in October 1999, the Terek Range operation, and the final capture of Grozny in January 2000, and the capture of Shaami-Yurt in March 2000. The 205th was among the units that captured the heavily fortified Staropromoyslovsky district of Grozny.

During the First and Second Chechen Wars, 1,500 personnel of the brigade were decorated, including 35 awarded the Medal "For Battle Merit", 279 the Medal "For Courage", 414 the Medal of Suvorov, and 572 the Medal of Zhukov. Five soldiers were awarded the title Hero of the Russian Federation: Captain Stanislav Kravtsov, Private Aleksandr Yakovlev, Senior Lieutenant Vitaly Potylitsyn, Private Andrey Zavyalkin, and Colonel Sergey Stvolov, all posthumously except for Stvolov. The brigade lost 408 personnel in the wars in Chechnya and Dagestan.

=== 2000s to present ===
In the 2000s, the 584th Separate Spetsnaz Company was withdrawn from the brigade and the 1396th Separate Motor Rifle Battalion disbanded.

The brigade fought in the Russo-Georgian War in 2008. During the 2009 Russian military reforms, its structure was standardized, and its battalions lost their unique designations. The brigade transferred from the 58th Combined Arms Army to the new 49th Combined Arms Army by 2015. Its personnel participated in relief efforts in response to the 2012 floods in Krymsk. According to 2015 open source data, the brigade included 40 T-72B3, one T-72BK, 159 MT-LB, 18 BM-21 Grad, 36 2S3 Akatsiya, 18 2S12 Sani, six MT-12 Rapira, twelve Shturm-S, eleven BTR-80, four BDRM-2, twelve Tor-M1, six Strela-10, six 2S6M Tunguska and 27 9K38 Igla.

After conscription was reintroduced in Chechnya in 2014, a large number of Chechen conscripts were sent to the brigade. Ethnic tensions between North Caucasian conscripts and ethnic Russians in the brigade led to a fight after which four Chechens were charged with assault in February 2015. There were reports of widespread discrimination against the Chechen conscripts arising from Russian ethnonationalism among brigade soldiers and the anti-Chechen attitude of brigade political officer Colonel Nikolay Borisenko.

A motor rifle battalion chief of staff of the brigade, Captain Nikolay Afanasov, was killed by mortar fire on 10 July 2017 while serving as a military advisor to Syrian government troops in Hama Governorate during the Russian military intervention in the Syrian civil war.

The 205th was committed to the Russian invasion of Ukraine as part of the 49th Army. The Ukrainian General Staff reported on 3 March 2022 that elements of the brigade were sent into combat from the reserves in an attack towards the outskirts of Zaporizhzhia and Mariupol. Units of the brigade briefly occupied the village of Kashpero-Mykolaivka in Mykolaiv Oblast during March 2022. According to Ukrainian officials, a unit of the brigade was responsible for the July 2022 deportation of 15 children from Novopetrivka, Mykolaiv Oblast, to Russian territory.

On June 6, 2023, Ukrainian officials claimed that the brigade was responsible for the destruction of the Kakhovka Reservoir dam.

On December 13, 2024, the brigade was awarded the "Guards" title.

== Commanders ==
- Lieutenant Colonel (promoted to Colonel June 1995 and Major General 1996) Valery Nazarov (May 1995–January 1997)
- Colonel Sergey Mishanin (from January 1997)
- Major General Sergey Derepko
- Major General Sergey Tulin (from July 2000)
- Major General Sergey Istrakov (2002–2003)
- Major General Aleksandr Lapin (2004–2006)
- Major General Konstantin Kastornov (2006–2008)
- Major General Grigory Tyurin (2008–2011)
- Major General Andrey Ivanayev (2011–2012)
- Major General Vladimir Donskikh (2012–2015)
- Colonel (promoted to Major General December 2016) Oleg Tsokov (2015–2018)
- Colonel Nikolay Lega (2018–2019)
- Colonel Dmitry Ovcharov (2019–May 2021)
- Colonel Eduard Shandura (May 2021–2022)
