= Verkhneye Khvarshini =

Verkhneye Khvarshini Верхнее Хваршини
- Selo
- Location within Republic of Dagestan Location within Russia
- Coordinates: 42°24′N 45°50′E
- Country: Russia
- Region: Republic of Dagestan
- District: Tsumadinsky District
- Time zone: UTC+3:00

Verkhneye Khvarshini (Russian: Верхнее Хваршини) is a rural locality (a selo) in Tsumadinsky District, Republic of Dagestan, Russia. Population: 292 (2021 census); 175 (2002 census); 121 (1989 Soviet census). There are 2 streets in this selo.

== Geography ==
Selo is located 27 km from Agvali (the district's administrative centre), 149 km from Makhachkala (capital of Dagestan) and 1,630 km from Moscow. Tsykhalakh is the nearest rural locality.
