= Nizhniye Gakvari =

Nizhniye Gakvari Нижнее Гаквари
- Selo
- Location within Republic of Dagestan Location within Russia
- Coordinates: 42°32′N 46°03′E
- Country: Russia
- Region: Republic of Dagestan
- District: Tsumadinsky District
- Time zone: UTC+3:00

Nizhniye Gakvari (Russian: Нижнее Гаквари) is a rural locality (a selo) in Tsumadinsky District, Republic of Dagestan, Russia. Population: 595 (2021 census); 627 (2002 census); 353 (1989 Soviet census). There are 4 streets in this selo.

== Geography ==
It is located 6 km from Agvali (the district's administrative centre), 128 km from Makhachkala (capital of Dagestan) and 1,624 km from Moscow. Tsitadl is the nearest rural locality.
