= Gigikh =

Gigikh Гигих
- Selo
- Location within Republic of Dagestan Location within Russia
- Coordinates: 42°31′N 46°06′E
- Country: Russia
- Region: Republic of Dagestan
- District: Tsumadinsky District
- Time zone: UTC+3:00

Gigikh (Russian: Гигих) is a rural locality (a selo) in Tsumadinsky District, Republic of Dagestan, Russia. Population: 166 (2021 census); 144 (2002 census); 115 (1989 Soviet census). There are 3 streets in this selo.

== Geography ==
Selo is located 2 km from Agvali (the district's administrative centre), 124 km from Makhachkala (capital of Dagestan) and 1,626 km from Moscow. Kochali is the nearest rural locality.
