= Sagada, Tsuntinsky District, Republic of Dagestan =

Sagada Сагада
- Selo
- Location within Republic of Dagestan Location within Russia
- Coordinates: 42°23′N 45°55′E
- Country: Russia
- Region: Republic of Dagestan
- District: Tsuntinsky District
- Time zone: UTC+3:00

Sagada (Russian: Сагада) is a rural locality (a selo) in Tsuntinsky District, Republic of Dagestan, Russia. Population: 513 (2021 census); 322 (2002 census); 280 (1989 Soviet census). There are 3 streets in this selo.

== Geography ==
Selo is located 145 km from Makhachkala (capital of Dagestan) and 1,635 km from Moscow. Metrada is the nearest rural locality.
