= Sanukh =

Sanukh Санух
- Selo
- Location within Republic of Dagestan Location within Russia
- Coordinates: 42°28′N 46°08′E
- Country: Russia
- Region: Republic of Dagestan
- District: Tsumadinsky District
- Time zone: UTC+3:00

Sanukh (Russian: Санух) is a rural locality (a selo) in Tsumadinsky District, Republic of Dagestan, Russia. Population: 51 (2021 census); 21 (2002 census); 28 (1989 Soviet census). There is 1 streets in this selo.

== Geography ==
Selo is located 8 km from Agvali (the district's administrative centre), 125 km from Makhachkala (capital of Dagestan) and 1,634 km from Moscow. Tenla is the nearest rural locality.
