= Metrada =

Metrada Метрада
- Selo
- Location within Republic of Dagestan Location within Russia
- Coordinates: 42°23′N 45°53′E
- Country: Russia
- Region: Republic of Dagestan
- District: Tsumadinsky District
- Time zone: UTC+3:00

Metrada (Russian: Метрада) is a rural locality (a selo) in Tsumadinsky District, Republic of Dagestan, Russia. Population: 680 (2021 census); 392 (2002 census); 264 (1989 Soviet census). There are 3 streets in this selo.

== Geography ==
It is located 25 km from Agvali (the district's administrative centre), 147 km from Makhachkala (capital of Dagestan) and 1,634 km from Moscow. Sagada is the nearest rural locality.
