= Abakarov =

Abakarov (feminine: Abakarova) is a surname. Notable people with the surname include:

- Abubakr Abakarov (born 1999), Russian-Azerbaijani wrestler
- Kadi Abakarov (1913–1948), Avar Red Army sergeant in World War II
- Khizri Abakarov (born 1960), Russian politician
- Patimat Abakarova (born 1994), Russian taekwondo athlete
- Zelimkhan Abakarov (born 1993), Russian-born Albanian wrestler
