= Liberation Army of Dagestan =

Nonexistent militant group

- Dates active: 1999 - 2002 (alleged)
- Active regions: Russia
- Ideology: Islamism, Nationalism, Separatism
- Status: Nonexistent

The Liberation Army of Dagestan (also known as the Dagestan Liberation Army or the Army of the Liberation of Dagestan) was a nonexistent militant organization supposedly based in Dagestan, claimed by anonymous callers to be responsible for the 1999 Russian apartment bombings.

== First mentions ==
=== First phone call ===
On September 2, 1999 a journalist working for the Agence France-Presse news agency in Grozny received a phone call from someone known only as Khasbulat. The caller identified himself as a member of the Army of the Liberation of Dagestan and claimed that it was responsible for the explosion at Manezhnaya Square in Moscow on 31 August 1999. He added that similar acts would occur throughout the Russian Federation until Russian soldiers left Dagestan. According to Khasbulat, the Army of the Liberation of Dagestan was a subdivision of the Islamic Army of Caucasus led by Sheikh Muhammed Baggaudin. The leader of the Wahhabi community, Sheikh Baggaudin, a native in the village of Karamakhi, had created this army in response to the assault of the federal troops on his birthplace.

=== Second phone call ===
On September 9, 1999, an anonymous person speaking with a Caucasian accent called the Interfax news agency, saying that the blasts in Buynaksk and Moscow were "our response to the bombings of civilians in the villages in Chechnya and Dagestan."

=== Third phone call ===
On September 15, 1999, an unidentified man, again speaking with a Caucasian accent, called the ITAR-TASS news agency, claiming to represent the Liberation Army of Dagestan. He said that the explosions in Buynaksk and Moscow were carried out by his organization. According to him the attacks were in retaliation for the deaths of Muslim women and children during Russian air raids in Dagestan. "We will answer death with death," the caller said.

== Reception ==
=== Officials ===
Russian officials from both the Interior Ministry and FSB at the time expressed skepticism over the claims. Sergei Bogdanov of the FSB press service in Moscow said that the words of a previously unknown individual representing a semimythical organization should not be considered as reliable. Bogdanov insisted that the organization had nothing to do with the bombings. On September 15, 1999 a Dagestani official also denied the existence of a "Dagestan Liberation Army".

=== Reddaway and Glinski ===
According to professor Peter Reddaway and researcher Dmitri Glinski, the involvement of the Liberation Army of Dagestan is a more plausible theory than others and they may indeed have perpetrated the bombings, with or without Russian government assistance. They wrote that if this was the case the group would likely originate from the religious conservative villages Karamakhi, Chabanmakhi and a few other neighbouring villages in central Dagestan. They also wrote that if so, they believe "it is impossible that the Moscow authorities did not know of the plans, at least in general terms", noting that "even before Stepashin visited the district a year earlier, they must have been receiving numerous reports from, in particular, the FSB, the Interior Ministry and probably eavesdropping agency FAPSI." A journalist who in mid-August 1999 traveled to Karamakhi and interviewed some villagers and their military commander General Dzherollak, wrote: "The Wahhabis' trucks go all over Russia. Even one wrong move in Moscow or Makhachkala, they warn, will lead to bombs and bloodshed everywhere." According to the journalist the Wahhabis had told him, "if they start bombing us, we know where our bombs will explode." In the last days of August, Russian military launched an aerial bombing of the villages.

=== Murphy ===
According to former US counter-terrorism official Paul J. Murphy, Russia's official investigation of the bombings proved that the Liberation Army of Dagestan is the same as the Islamic Army of Dagestan, which launched the invasion of the region from Chechnya in August 1999.
