= Battle of Vedeno =

2001 battle during the Second Chechen War

Coordinates: 42°58′N 46°5′E

- Part of the Second Chechen War
Date	13–26 August 2001 (1 week and 6 days)
Location	Vedeno, Chechnya and surrounding villages
Result	Chechen victory
Territorial changes	Vedeno seized by rebels

Belligerents
Russia	Chechen Republic of Ichkeria; Mujahideen

Commanders and leaders
Unknown	(Chechen Republic of Ichkeria) Shamil Basayev; Ibn al-Khattab

Strength
700+ 3 helicopters	25

Casualties and losses
40+ killed (rebel claim); 3 helicopters destroyed	Unknown

The Battle of Vedeno was fought between Russian federal forces and Chechen rebels for control of the mountainous Vedensky District in southeastern Chechnya and its capital Vedeno.

== Battle ==
The battle started on 13 August 2001, when Chechen rebels seized the village of Benoi-Yurt, attacked the local military commandant's office, and placed checkpoints on a strategic road that leads further south to the town of Vedeno. Pro-Moscow administrators were reportedly killed by the rebels. Fierce fighting continued the next day on 14 August, described as the "heaviest attack by Chechen fighters in the past seventeen months." Russian sources denied reports by independent agencies, claiming that the situation was under control; however, federal reinforcements were immediately sent to the area. Russian presidential spokesman Sergei Yastrzhembsky called the latest developments "an imitation of activity by 'the gangs'."

The Russian army began firing SCUD missiles at Vedeno on 15 August. Meanwhile, rebels hit a military helicopter with a grenade launcher near Tsa Vedeno, resulting in its crash and the deaths of both its pilots. Two days later on 17 August, Chechen fighters shot down a third helicopter, then-incumbent minister of information Movladi Udugov. The news was partly denied by Russian officials, who only admitted to two helicopters having been shot down.

The Russian government announced on 22 August that the army had wounded Shamil Basayev, the country’s most wanted man who killed more than 35 other rebels in Chechnya, while a pro-rebel website insisted more than 40 Russians had died in fierce fighting, including 14 in two separate ambushes.

On 26 August, Chechen rebels reportedly managed to seize control of Vedeno. At the same time, Russian media, citing military sources, reported an upsurge in the number of attacks on federal forces in Chechnya's northern districts, which were previously regarded as having been pacified.
