= Tando =

Village in Botlikhsky, Dagestan, Russia

Coordinates: 42.6778°N 46.2638°E

Tando (Russian: Тандо; Avar: Тӏандо) is a village (selo) in Botlikhsky District of the Republic of Dagestan, Russia.

The village was seized by a Chechen guerrilla unit led by Shamil Basayev in August 1999 in the course of the Invasion of Dagestan.
