= Kvantlada =

Kvantlada Квантлада
- Selo
- Location within Republic of Dagestan Location within Russia
- Coordinates: 42°23′N 46°03′E
- Country: Russia
- Region: Republic of Dagestan
- District: Tsumadinsky District
- Time zone: UTC+3:00

Kvantlada (Russian: Квантлада) is a rural locality (a selo) in Tsumadinsky District, Republic of Dagestan, Russia. Population: 99 (2021 census); 74 (2002 census); 42 (1989 Soviet census). There is 1 street in this selo.

== Geography ==
Selo is located 17 km from Agvali (the district's administrative centre), 134 km from Makhachkala (capital of Dagestan) and 1,640 km from Moscow.
