= Khassan Baiev =

Russian surgeon

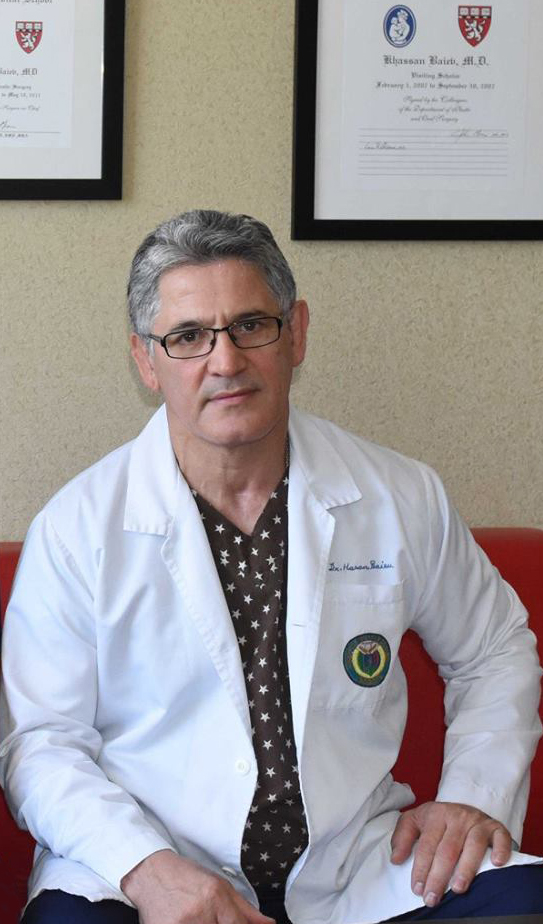
- Born: 4 April 1963 (age 62); Alkhan Kala, Chechen-Ingush ASSR, Soviet Union
- Education: Krasnoyarsk Medical Institute
- Occupations: Surgeon, Author
- Spouse: Zara Tokaeva
- Children: Maryam, Islam, Markha, Satsita

Khassan Zhunidovich Baiev (Russian: Хасан Жунидович Баиев; born 4 April 1963) is a Russian-American surgeon of Chechen origin who performed numerous operations under critical conditions during the Second Chechen War. He is mostly known as author of two memoirs, The Oath: A Surgeon Under Fire and Grief of My Heart: Memoirs of a Chechen Surgeon.

== Early life and education ==
Khassan Baiev was born as a fraternal twin in Alkhan-Kala, a suburb of Grozny, in April 1963. His father, a herbalist by profession, served in the Soviet Red Army and was wounded during World War II, but was deported to Kazakhstan as a result of the forced deportations of most Chechens to Central Asia in February 1944. Baiev's parents would return in 1959 after Nikita Khrushchev allowed for the Chechens to return home during the de-Stalinization campaign.

Plagued by frailty and illness growing up, Baiev took up martial arts to overcome his physical weaknesses – by late adolescence he was a black belt judoka who won national competitions and faced a promising career as a coach in the sports-oriented Soviet Union. However, Baiev desired to become a doctor, as his sisters were nurses and his father a herbalist, and in his words, "I always wanted to do something that would be of service to society." Baiev was accepted to the Krasnoyarsk Medical Institute in Siberia in 1980 and specialized in maxillofacial surgery.

== Career ==
In 1985, Baiev graduated from medical school and started his specialist training. He returned to Chechnya in 1988 and became a successful plastic surgeon; and, in the early 1990s, he went to Moscow for additional training. He has said of his practice in Moscow:

"In Moscow, 75% of my patients were people who wanted facelifts and tummy tucks, while 25% were accident victims. People came from abroad—Sweden, Germany, Switzerland—for plastic surgery because we were offering such operations at a tenth of the cost in their countries. I could have stayed in Moscow, but by 1994 it was clear that war was going to break out, and I decided it was my duty to help my fellow Chechens."

By 2000, Baiev was the single surgeon for nearly 80,000 residents near Grozny, the capital of Chechnya, and at one point during the conflict he performed 67 amputations and eight brain operations in a 48-hour period. His patients included the rebel leaders Shamil Basayev and Salman Raduyev. Both sides of the conflict saw Baiev's actions of treating the other side as treason and multiple death threats were made against him.

Consequently, the human rights organization Physicians for Human Rights sponsored Baiev for political asylum in the United States during the Second Chechen War and Baiev flew to Washington, DC, in April 2000. After his family joined him in the U.S. ten months later, Baiev and his family have been living in Needham, Massachusetts. As of 2008, Dr. Khassan has been treating pediatric patients in Grozny, especially in deformations of the face and amputated limbs.

== Books ==
- Grief of My Heart: Memoirs of a Chechen Surgeon (2005)
- The Oath: A Surgeon Under Fire (2004)
