= Adam Tepsurgayev =

Russian journalist (1976–2000)

- Born: 1976; Chechno-Ingush ASSR, Soviet Union
- Died: November 21, 2000 (aged 24); Alkhan-Kala, Chechnya, Russia
- Cause of death: Gunshot wounds
- Occupation: Freelance cameraman
- Known for: Shot and killed in the village of Alkhan-Kala, in Chechnya, Russia

Adam Tepsurgayev (c. 1976 – November 21, 2000) was a Chechen freelance cameraman who was shot and killed in the village of Alkhan-Kala, in Chechnya, Russia.

== Career ==
Tepsurgayev began his career in journalism as a driver and a fixer for foreign journalists during the First Chechen War (1994–1996) between Russian troops and Chechen separatist guerrillas. Later he contributed to Reuters on an irregular basis and provided outlets with footage he shot from the front lines of the conflict. Reuters' shots of Chechen field commander Shamil Basayev having his foot amputated were taken by Tepsurgayev. Prior to his death, Reuters had not published his work for six months. The Kremlin's Second Chechen War aide, Sergei Yastrzhembsky, commented that Tepsurgayev had not been accredited by the Russian authorities.

== Death ==
Chechen-speaking masked gunmen shot him in the thigh and groin; he subsequently bled to death. Adam's brother Ali Tepsurgayev said that Adam had been killed as punishment for his work as a journalist. He himself was wounded in the leg during the attack.

== Reactions ==
A Russian government spokesman blamed Chechen guerrillas for the murder, but local residents said the rebels had no reason to kill the cameraman.
