= Oleg Tsokov =

Russian general (1971–2023)

- Олег Юрьевич Цоков
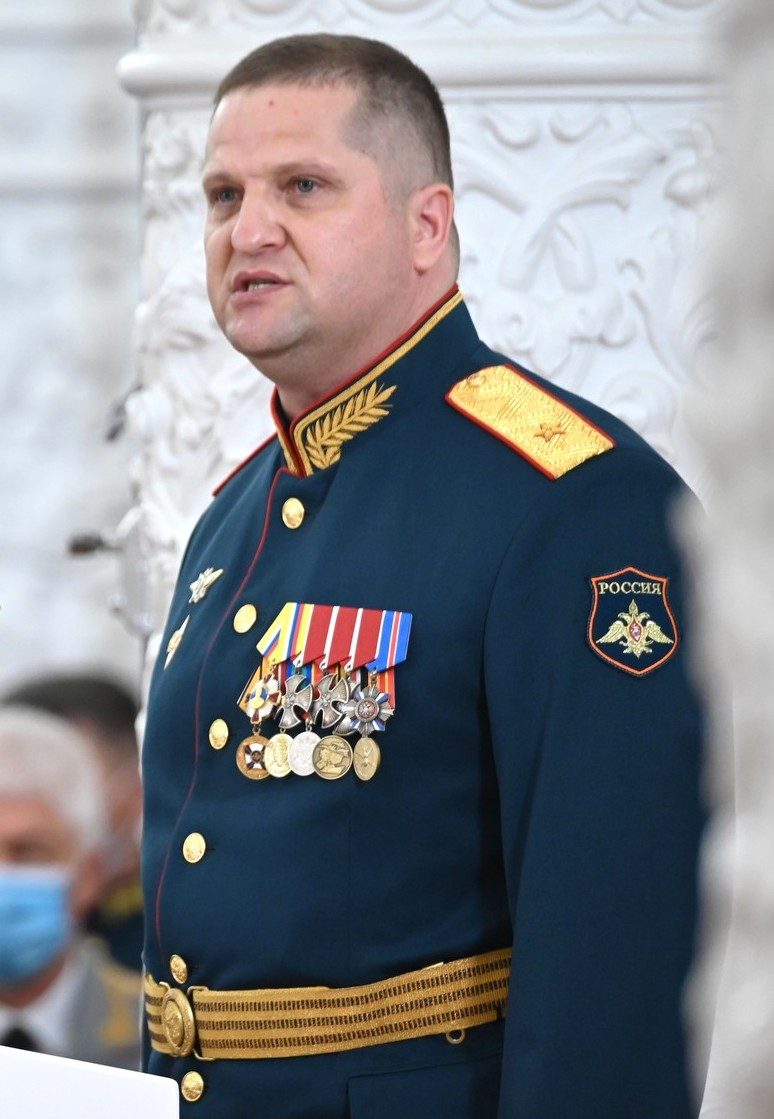
- Tsokov in 2021
- Born: Oleg Yuryevich Tsokov; 23 September 1971; Gʻazalkent, Uzbek SSR, Soviet Union
- Died: 11 July 2023 (aged 51); Berdiansk, Russian occupation of Zaporizhzhia Oblast
- Cause of death: Killed in Action
- Military career
- Allegiance: Russia
- Branch: Russian Ground Forces
- Service years: 1990–2023
- Rank: Lieutenant general
- Commands: 205th Separate Motor Rifle Brigade; 810th Separate Naval Infantry Brigade; 20th Guards Combined Arms Army
- Conflicts: First Chechen War; Second Chechen War; Syrian Civil War; Russo-Ukrainian War; Russian invasion of Ukraine; 2023 Ukrainian counteroffensive †

Oleg Yuryevich Tsokov (Russian: Олег Юрьевич Цоков; 23 September 1971 – 11 July 2023) was a Russian lieutenant general who served in the Russian Ground Forces as deputy commander of the Southern Military District. He was killed in 2023 by a missile strike during a Ukrainian counteroffensive against the Russian invasion of Ukraine.

== Biography ==
Oleg Yuryevich Tsokov was the son of Yuri Georgievich, a military officer, and Alla Ivanovna, a physicist-mathematician. Since his family moved often, he grew up on military bases and studied at eleven different schools, including in Choibalsan and Semipalatinsk, before receiving his secondary education certificate. Following in his father's footsteps, Tsokov chose a military career and was accepted to the Tashkent Higher Combined Arms Command School. Graduating in 1994, he was posted to the 74th Separate Guards Motor Rifle Brigade at Yurga in the Siberian Military District as a motor rifle platoon commander. Tsokov was deployed to the First Chechen War with the brigade, taking part in the storming of the Grozny Oil Institute during the Battle of Grozny in January 1995. After the end of the battle, Tsokov's unit was sent back to Siberia, but he was sent back to Chechnya for four months as a motor rifle company commander, with his unit attached to a spetsnaz detachment. Tsokov rose to battalion deputy commander with the 74th Brigade before being accepted to the Frunze Military Academy. Graduating in 2000, Tsokov, by then a major, returned to the brigade, fighting in the Second Chechen War that year as commander of a battalion-tactical group formed around the brigade's 2nd Motor Rifle Battalion. He remained battalion commander until 2004, being promoted to lieutenant colonel.

Tsokov was promoted to colonel and brigade deputy commander in 2004, gaining the rank at the relatively young age of 32. His career continued to advance as he was promoted to command the 228th Motor Rifle Regiment of the 85th Motor Rifle Division in 2006. After his regimental command, he was appointed chief of staff and deputy commander of the 36th Separate Guards Motor Rifle Brigade in the Eastern Military District, serving there from 2009 to 2011. In November 2010, the Investigative Committee of Russia charged Tsokov with committing fraud and abuse of power during his period in command of the 228th Regiment. The case involved a deal in which he illegally promised eleven conscripts early demobilization in return for signing service contracts, then embezzled 80,000 rubles from the soldiers' contract signing bonuses.

This case did not affect his career and in 2011 Tsokov was transferred to serve as chief of staff and deputy commander of the 33rd Separate Motor Rifle Brigade of the 49th Combined Arms Army of the Southern Military District, based at Maykop. From 2014 to 2015 he commanded the 810th Separate Naval Infantry Brigade. From 2015 to 2018, he commanded the 205th Separate Motor Rifle Brigade at Budyonnovsk, being promoted to major general on 12 December 2016. From 2018 to 2019, he was deputy commander of the 49th Combined Arms Army. Tsokov passed the exams for the Military Academy of the General Staff, entering the academy in September 2019. After graduating from its national security and state defense department in June 2021, Tsokov was appointed chief of staff of the 2nd Guards Combined Arms Army.

Tsokov took part in the Russian invasion of Ukraine that began on 24 February 2022. He was involved in missile attacks against Ukrainian cities. In August 2022, he took command of the 144th Guards Motor Rifle Division. In September 2022, Ukrainian presidential spokesman Oleksii Arestovych claimed that Tsokov was wounded while commanding the 144th Guards Motor Rifle Division. A Russian telegram channel confirmed his wounding but stated that Tsokov had in fact commanded the 20th Guards Combined Arms Army since summer 2022, and Tsokov's successor in command of the 144th Division was described as having taken over from Tsokov in summer 2022. Subsequently, Tsokov was promoted to deputy commander of the Southern Military District, and received a promotion to lieutenant general on 17 February 2023. He was killed on 11 July in a strike against the command post of the 58th Combined Arms Army in Berdiansk, during the 2023 Ukrainian counteroffensive. Tsokov's death at age 51 was confirmed by the Russian milblogger telegram channel Military Informer, making him one of the two highest-ranking Russian officers killed in Ukraine as of July 2023. He was buried on 13 July in Maikop.

Tsokov was posthumously awarded the title of Hero of the Russian Federation on 19 July 2023.

== Awards ==
Tsokov received the following decorations:

- Hero of the Russian Federation
- Order of Zhukov
- Order of Courage (3)
- Order of Military Merit
- Military operation in Syria medal

== See also ==
- List of Russian generals killed during the Russian invasion of Ukraine
