= Dzhangamakhi =

Dzhangamakhi Джангамахи Жангамахьи
- Selo
- Location within Republic of Dagestan Location within Russia
- Coordinates: 42°32′N 47°18′E
- Country: Russia
- Region: Republic of Dagestan
- District: Levashinsky District
- Time zone: UTC+3:00

Dzhangamakhi (Russian: Джангамахи; Dargwa: Жангамахьи) is a rural locality (a selo) and the administrative centre of Dzhangamakhinsky Selsoviet, Levashinsky District, Republic of Dagestan, Russia. The population was 698 as of 2010. There are 16 streets.

== Geography ==
Dzhangamakhi is located 10 km northeast of Levashi (the district's administrative centre) by road. Elakatmakhi is the nearest rural locality.

== Nationalities ==
Dargins live there.
