= Rakhata =

Rakhata Рахата
- Selo
- Location within Republic of Dagestan Location within Russia
- Coordinates: 42°41′24″N 46°08′46″E
- Country: Russia
- Region: Republic of Dagestan
- District: Botlikhsky District
- Time zone: UTC+3:00

Rakhata (Russian: Рахата) is a rural locality (a selo) in Botlikhsky District, Republic of Dagestan, Russia. The population was 2,909 as of 2010. There are 34 streets.

== Geography ==
Rakhata is located on the Ansalta River, 13 km northwest of Botlikh (the district's administrative centre) by road. Tando is the nearest rural locality.
