= Miarso =

Miarso Миарсо Мигӏарсо
- Selo
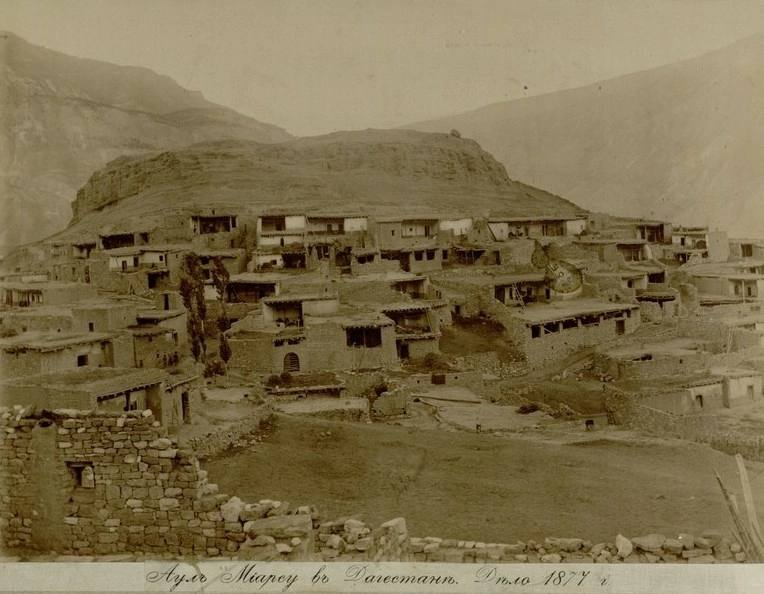
- Miarso in 1877

- Location within Republic of Dagestan Location within Russia
- Coordinates: 42°39′N 46°10′E
- Country: Russia
- Region: Republic of Dagestan
- District: Botlikhsky District
- Time zone: UTC+3:00

Miarso (Russian: Миарсо; Avar: Мигӏарсо) is a rural locality (a selo) in Botlikhsky District, Republic of Dagestan, Russia. The population was 3,049 as of 2010. There are 13 streets.

== Geography ==
Miarso is located 8 km northwest of Botlikh (the district's administrative centre) by road, on the left bank of the Ansalta River. Botlikh is the nearest rural locality.
