= Kadar, Russia =

Kadar Кадар
- Rural locality
- Interactive map of Kadar
- Location of Kadar Kadar (Republic of Dagestan)
- Coordinates: 42.6148°N 47.3018°E
- Country: Russia
- Federal subject: Dagestan
- Administrative district: Buynaksky District

Population
  - Estimate (2025): 3,064 )
- Time zone: UTC+3 (MSK)
- Postal code: 368203
- OKTMO ID: 82611444101

Kadar (Russian: Кадар; Dargwa: Къадар) is a rural locality in the Buynaksky District of the Republic of Dagestan in Russia. It was one of four villages under the control of the Islamic Djamaat of Dagestan between 1998 and 1999.

== Geography ==
Kadar is located 28 km southeast of the regional capital of Buynaksk, in the southeastern part of the Buynaksky District. Its highest point is 1,536 meters above sea level. Kadar is bordered to the west by the rural locality of Karamakhi, to the north by Chankurbe and Vanashimahi, in the northeast by Kachkalykom, and in the south and southeast by the Chonkatau Ridge.

== History ==
Kadar was capital of the Kadar state of the Akusha-Dargo Confederacy. Kadar was a stronghold that provided protection for several villages. It also expanded into Kumuk lands. In the 14th century, Tamerlan invaded the North Caucasus and destroyed the Kadar Castle. It took Kadar several centuries to recover. In the 19th century, when Akusha-Dargo seized its lands, Kadar joined the Russian Empire.
