= Thando =

Thando is a unisex given name, common in southern Africa, which means "love". It may refer to:

- Thando Nomhle McLaren (born 1977), pen name Na'ima B. Robert, South African/British author
- Thando Bula (born 1981), South African cricketer
- Thando Mgqolozana (born 1983), South African writer
- Thando Mngomeni (born 1983), South African football (soccer) player
- Thando Ntini (born 2000), South African cricketer
- Thando Sikwila (born 1993), Zimbabwean/Australian singer
- Thando Thabethe (born 1990), South African actress
