= Ansalta =

Ansalta Ансалта Ансалтӏа
- Selo
- Location within Republic of Dagestan Location within Russia
- Coordinates: 42°41′N 46°06′E
- Country: Russia
- Region: Republic of Dagestan
- District: Botlikhsky District
- Time zone: UTC+3:00

Ansalta (Russian: Ансалта; Avar: Ансалтӏа) is a rural locality (a selo) in Ansaltinsky Selsoviet, Botlikhsky District, Republic of Dagestan, Russia. The population was 4,598 as of 2010. There are 19 streets.

== Geography ==
Ansalta is located 16 km northwest of Botlikh (the district's administrative centre) by road. Shodroda is the nearest rural locality.
