= Said Amirov =

Dagestani economist and politician

- Саид Амиров

Mayor of Makhachkala
- In office 15 February 1998 – 14 June 2013
- Preceded by: Magomed Magomedov
- Succeeded by: Musa Musayev

Personal details
- Born: 5 March 1954 (age 72) Dzhangamakhi, Russian SFSR, Soviet Union
- Spouse: Sultanum Amirova

Said Dzhaparovich Amirov (Russian: Саи́д Джапа́рович Ами́ров, born 5 March 1954) is a Russian economist and former politician for United Russia who was mayor of Makhachkala from 1998 to 2013. He was detained in June 2013 on suspicion of having ordered the murder of state investigator Arsen Gadzhibeko in 2011. Amirov was suspended from his position as mayor of Makhachkala on 14 June 2013 by the Basmanny Court of Moscow which also ruled that Amirov could be kept in custody until November 2013. He is currently serving a life sentence on charges of terrorism and commissioning contract killings.

== Early life and civil career ==
Said Amirov was born in the village Dzhanga-Makhi in central Dagestan, an area from which many leading politicians in Dagestan hail. He is an ethnic Dargin.

Amirov obtained a degree in economics at the All-Union Institute of the Food Industry in 1983, and a Candidate degree in economics from the St. Petersburg Engineering and Economics Institute in 1992. In 2006, he obtained a doctorate degree. He teaches at Dagestan's State University, and is a member of the Academy of Social and Humanitarian Sciences, and the Russian Municipal Academy.

From 1971 to 1991, Amirov worked in various positions for consumers' cooperatives, ultimately becoming chairman of the consumers' union Dagpotrebsoyuz.

== Political career ==
He was deputy Chairman of the State Council of the Republic of Dagestan from 1991 to 1998, and is also the founder of the Dagestani People's Reform Party. In 1998, he was elected mayor of Makhachkala with more than 70% of the vote, and has subsequently been reelected.

Makhachkala has experienced substantial population growth and economic progress during Amirov's mayoral period. He has twice been voted Russia's best mayor. He has at the same time been accused of being part of widespread corruption.

== Survival of assassination attempts ==
Amirov has been the victim of several assassination attempts—15, according to many sources—and has used a wheelchair since his spine was hit by a bullet in 1993. In 1998, a bomb went off at his father's gravesite. Amirov used to visit the grave daily, but was not present when the bomb went off. One person was wounded. On 4 September 1998, explosives went off near his house, killing 20 people in the neighbourhood, and injuring eight more. Two relatives of Sharaputdin Musaev, chairman of Dagestan's Pension Fund, were later found guilty of the attack.

== Murder charge ==
On 1 June 2013, Amirov was detained by Russian forces on suspicion of involvement in the 2011 murder of state investigator Arsen Gadzhibekov. Ten other persons were arrested in the same operation. Amirov was brought to Moscow for questioning. According to Life News, investigators were also looking into whether Amirov was connected to the criminal group Kolkhozniki, which is believed to be involved in drug trafficking, among other crimes. Amirov denied being involved with the murder, and, according to his lawyer Mark Kruter, claimed he had become the victim of political games. Amirov was placed in custody in Lefortovo pre-trial prison. His advocates has argued that Amirov's health problems makes him unfit to be in prison and requested the Basmanny Court of Moscow to allow home arrest instead. The court turned down the request on 3 July 2013 and on 26 July 2013 it extended the custody period to November 2013 after Amirov had undergone a medical examination in a hospital.

Amirov was suspended from his position as mayor of Makhachkala on 14 June 2013 by the Basmanny Court.

On 9 July 2014 he was found guilty of planning a terrorist act and was sentenced to 10 years in a penal colony.

On 27 August 2015 he was found guilty of a number of other crimes and was sentenced for life. Amirov is serving his sentence at the Black Dolphin Prison.

== Anti-Corruption Prosecutions ==
In 2022, Kommersant reported that assets worth approximately 5 billion rubles, primarily consisting of Real estate, were seized from Amirov, his associates and associated business. The Prosecutor's Office of Russia asserted that public property had been illegally transferred to private ownership and should be returned to the state.

In August 2025 it was reported that a further 2.1 billion rubles in assets were seized from family members and associates of Amirov.
