= Shodroda =

Shodroda Шодрода
- Selo
- Location within Republic of Dagestan Location within Russia
- Coordinates: 42°40′N 46°07′E
- Country: Russia
- Region: Republic of Dagestan
- District: Botlikhsky District
- Time zone: UTC+3:00

Shodroda (Russian: Шодрода) is a rural locality (a selo) in Chankovsky Selsoviet, Botlikhsky District, Republic of Dagestan, Russia. The population was 808 as of 2010. There are 3 streets.

== Geography ==
Shodroda is located 18 km northwest of Botlikh (the district's administrative centre) by road. Ansalta is the nearest rural locality.
