= Karamakhi =

Village in Dagestan, Russia

Coordinates: 42°37′04″N 47°15′33″E

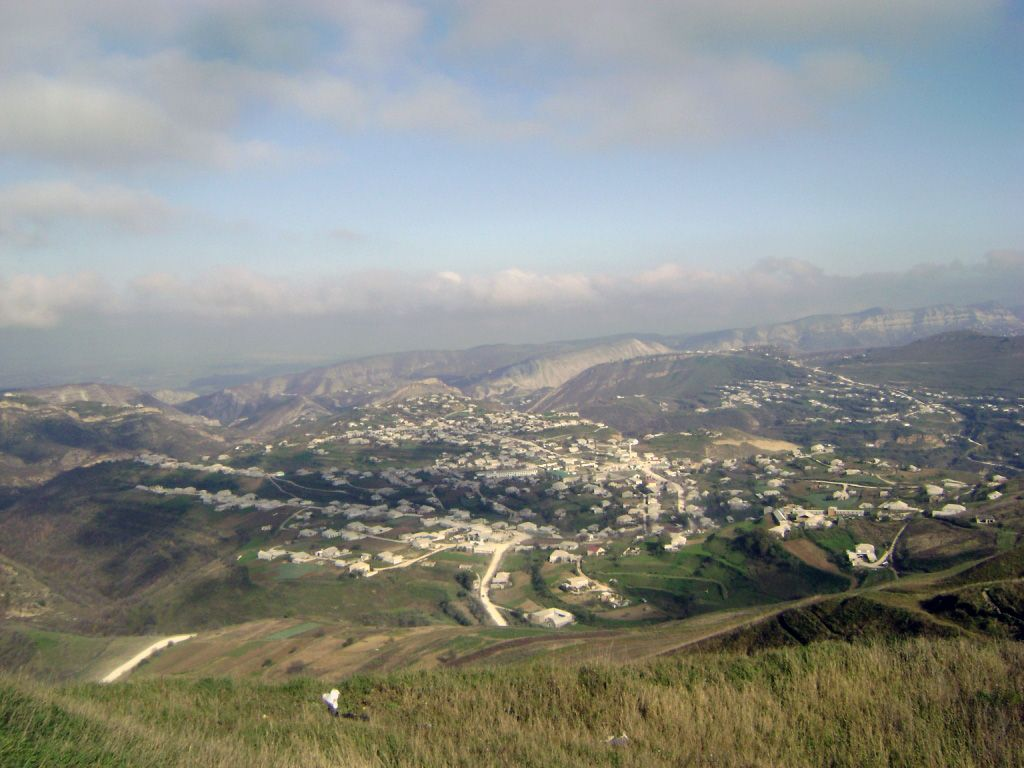
Karamakhi

Karamakhi (Russian: Карамахи; Dargwa: Хъарамахи; Kumyk: Къарамахи юрт, Qaramahi yurt) is a rural locality (a selo) in Buynaksky District of the Republic of Dagestan, Russia. Population: 4,537 (2010 census); 3,647 (2002 census).

== History ==
In 1997–1999, Karamakhi (along with the village of Chabanmakhi) became a hotbed of radical Islamism. The majority of the villages' inhabitants accepted the ideology of the radical Jamaat movement, and the local Muslim community became a tiny Wahhabi republic, the advance guard of radical Islam in Dagestan. Young people in search of "pure Islam" flocked to these villages from all over Dagestan and other republics of the Northern Caucasus. Karamakhi became a heavily fortified militant stronghold. Sharia law was put in force in the villages. Muhajideen warlord Ibn Al-Khattab made Karamakhi the headquarters of his Islamic Army of the Caucasus. In August 1998, the local governments of Karamakhi, Chabanmakhi and Kadar declared the three villages as "liberated Islamic territory."

The village was the scene of heavy fighting during the Invasion of Dagestan, after Chechnya-based militants had launched an armed incursion to Dagestan from Chechnya. In late August, the Russian military began aerial bombardments of Karamakhi. These bombings were later mentioned by the Liberation Army of Dagestan and by Chechen leader Shamil Basayev as the reason for launching the 1999 Russian apartment bombings, as revenge.
