= Echeda =

Echeda Эчеда
- Village
- Interactive map of Echeda
- Location of Echeda
- Coordinates: 42°26′6.75″N 45°59′29.48″E
- Country: Russia
- Federal subject: Dagestan

Area
  - Total: 0.29 km^{2} (0.11 sq mi)
- Elevation: 1,401 m (4,596 ft)

Population
  - Estimate (2021): 951 )
- Time zone: UTC+3 (MSK)
- Postal code: 368907
- OKTMO ID: 82657475101

Echeda is a village in Dagestan, Russia. It is located on a steep hillside, and is 23.65 kilometres (14.70 mi) from Gora Addala Shukgelmezr.

== Militants ==
On 11 July 2014, a member of an illegal armed formation, who opened fire at law enforcers from the roof of a mosque, was shot dead in Echeda. The militants were identified as Merza Abdulkerimov, the leader of the Tsumandin gang, and his second-in-command Magomed Khuchbarov.
