= Chabanmakhi =

Chabanmakhi Чабанмахи Чабанмахьи
- Selo
- Location within Republic of Dagestan Location within Russia
- Coordinates: 42°38′N 47°15′E
- Country: Russia
- Region: Republic of Dagestan
- District: Buynaksky District
- Time zone: UTC+3:00

Chabanmakhi (Russian: Чабанмахи; Dargwa: Чабанмахьи) is a rural locality (a selo) in Karamakhinsky Selsoviet, Buynaksky District, Republic of Dagestan, Russia. The population was 1,083 as of 2010. There are 15 streets.

== Geography ==
Chabanmakhi is located 30 km southeast of Buynaksk (the district's administrative centre) by road. Durangi is the nearest rural locality.
