= Agvali =

Agvali Агвали
- Selo
- Interactive map of Agvali
- Location of Agvali Agvali (Republic of Dagestan)
- Coordinates: 42°32′20″N 46°07′27″E
- Country: Russia
- Federal subject: Dagestan
- Administrative district: Tsumadinsky District
- SettlementSelsoviet: Agvali Settlement
- Elevation: 975 m (3,199 ft)

Population (2010 Census)
  - Total: 2,455
  - Estimate (2025): 3,243 (+32.1%)

Administrative status
  - Capital of: Tsumadinsky District, Agvali Settlement

Municipal status
  - Municipal district: Tsumadinsky Municipal District
  - Rural settlement: Selo Agvali Rural Settlement
  - Capital of: Tsumadinsky Municipal District, Selo Agvali Rural Settlement
- Time zone: UTC+3 (MSK)
- Postal code: 368900
- OKTMO ID: 82657405101

Agvali (Russian: Агвали, Avar: Агъвали) is a rural locality (a selo) and the administrative center of Tsumadinsky District of the Republic of Dagestan, Russia. Population: 2,455 (2010 census); 2,016 (2002 census); 2,101 (1989 Soviet census).
