= Tsumadinsky District =

Tsumadinsky District Цумадинский район
- District

Other transcription(s)
  - Avar: Цӏумада мухъ
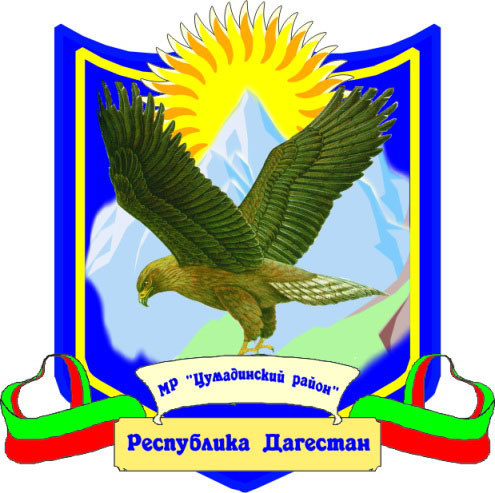
- Coat of arms
- Location of Tsumadinsky District in the Republic of Dagestan
- Coordinates: 42°32′N 46°06′E
- Country: Russia
- Federal subject: Republic of Dagestan
- Established: 1926
- Administrative center: Agvali

Area
  - Total: 1,100 km^{2} (420 sq mi)

Population (2010 Census)
  - Total: 23,345
  - Density: 21/km^{2} (55/sq mi)
  - Urban: 0%
  - Rural: 100%

Administrative structure
  - Administrative divisions: 13 Selsoviets
  - Inhabited localities: 58 rural localities

Municipal structure
  - Municipally incorporated as: Tsumadinsky Municipal District
  - Municipal divisions: 0 urban settlements, 23 rural settlements
- Time zone: UTC+3 (MSK)
- OKTMO ID: 82657000
- Website: http://www.mo-tsumada.ru

Population of Tsumadinsky District
- 2010 Census: 23,345
- 2002 Census: 20,632
- 1989 Census: 16,194
- 1979 Census: 15,382

Tsumadinsky District (Russian: Цумади́нский райо́н, romanized: Tsumadínsky rayón; Avar: Цӏумада мухъ, romanized: Ⱬumada muӿ) is an administrative and municipal district (raion), one of the forty-one in the Republic of Dagestan, Russia. It is located in the west of the republic. The area of the district is 1,100 square kilometers (420 sq mi). Its administrative center is the rural locality (a selo) of Agvali. As of the 2010 Census, the total population of the district was 23,345, with the population of Agvali accounting for 10.5% of that number.

== Administrative and municipal status ==
Within the framework of administrative divisions, Tsumadinsky District is one of the forty-one in the Republic of Dagestan. The district is divided into thirteen selsoviets which comprise fifty-eight rural localities. As a municipal division, the district is incorporated as Tsumadinsky Municipal District. Its thirteen selsoviets are incorporated as twenty-three rural settlements within the municipal district. The selo of Agvali serves as the administrative center of both the administrative and municipal district.
