= Ali Aswad al-Jiburi =

ISIL commander (died 2016)

Abu Ayman al-Iraqi
- Born: Ali Aswad al-Jiburi; Mosul, Iraq
- Died: 18 May 2016; Tel Azba, Nineveh Governorate, Iraq
- Military career
- Allegiance: Al-Qaeda in Iraq (2004–2006); Islamic State of Iraq (2006–2012); Al-Nusra Front (2012–2013); Islamic State of Iraq and the Levant (2013–2014); Islamic State (2014–2016)
- Rank: Head of ISIL's Intelligence Diwan; Commander of ISIL's Latakia Branch; ISIL's governor of Deir ez-Zor
- Conflicts: Iraq War; Iraqi insurgency (2011–2013); Syrian Civil War; Deir ez-Zor clashes (2011–14); 2013 Latakia offensive; Deir ez-Zor offensive (April–July 2014); Iraqi Civil War (2014–2017)

Ali Aswad al-Jiburi (Arabic: علي أسود الجبوري), better known by his nom de guerre as Abu Ayman al-Iraqi (Arabic: أبو أيمن العراقي), was an Islamic State commander and Shura council member killed on 18 May 2016 by an airstrike in northern Iraq.

== Biography ==
=== Iraq war ===
Al-Jiburi's date of his birth is unknown, but according to an IS obituary he was from Mosul and completed his studies in English literature at the university in the city. Abu Ayman al-Iraqi has long been confused with former Iraqi army officer Abu Muhannad al-Suwaydawi but al-Jiburi was much younger and had no Ba'athist background.

He joined the early stages of the jihadist insurgency with Al-Qaeda's affiliates in Iraq after the 2003 invasion of Iraq. Al-Jiburi was arrested four years later in 2007 and held in Camp Bucca where he became acquainted with Ahmed al-Sharaa. During the Iraqi insurgency, after his release from prison he was the head of ISI's intelligence near Mosul and staged assassinations, raids against police and military as well as suicide bombings. In 2012 he was sent with Julani whom he had previously spent time with in prison, from Iraq to Syria in Aleppo to help start Jabhat al-Nusra.

In July 2013, two years after the American withdrawal from Iraq, Jiburi was believed to have taken part in the Abu Ghraib prison break where 500 prisoners escaped.

=== Syria ===
He arrived in Syria in 2012 with al-Julani as part of the then newly formed al-Nusra, which operated as the Islamic State of Iraq's secret branch in Syria, during which he was based in Aleppo. While in Syria, Jiburi was the head of ISIL's branch in the Latakia Governorate, while there he gained a reputation for "pathological violence" and brutality against the Free Syrian Army.

In March 2013, Jiburi met with ISIL's leader Abu Bakr al-Baghdadi in a village near Jabal al-Akrad, which at the time was ISIL's westernmost held piece of territory, and took part in the 2013 Latakia offensive alongside the Free Syrian Army, Ahrar al-Sham, and al-Nusra.

In July 2013 he killed a Free Syrian Army commander in Latakia after killing an Ahrar al-Sham commander who tried to stop him, which created tensions between the Free Syrian Army and ISIL, and almost led to an open conflict, however the tensions were mediated by Ansar al-Sham's military commander Abu Musa al Shishani and Junud al-Sham's leader Muslim Shishani in late 2013. While holding command over ISIL's presence in Latakia he also held other commands in western Syria and took part in multiple battles in northern and western Syria.

In November 2013, as tensions continued to rise between ISIL and other rebel groups including ISIL's allies al-Nusra and Ahrar al-Sham, efforts were being taken to reconcile issues between these groups, Jiburi ordered the assassination of Jalal Bayirli who attempted to be a mediator between ISIL and the other rebel groups. The rebels later asked ISIL to withdraw from Latakia and hand over Jiburi for his involvement in killings, which ISIL refused.

On 1 January 2014, after the death of an Ahrar al-Sham commander named Abu Rayyan the rebels attacked ISIL expelling the group from Latakia to its base in Raqqa, following the expulsion Jiburi moved to eastern Syria and was appointed as ISIL's governor in the Deir ez-Zor area known as Wilayat al-Khayr. During his tenure as the governor of Wilayat al-Khayr he commanded an assault on the border town of Abu Kamal which was repelled, then shifted his efforts into fighting against the rebels, launching an offensive against al-Nusra and allied groups in July. During the offensive ISIL defeated al-Nusra from Deir ez-Zor was its strongest branch, and was led by Abu Maria al-Qahtani who is reportedly a relative of Jiburi and strongly opposed ISIL, and rebel groups allied with it.

In the summer of 2014, he took part in a massacre against the Shaitat tribe resulting in the death of over 700 tribesmen, after the tribe rebelled against ISIL. He was later removed from his rank as governor and sent to Baghdad.

=== Iraqi Civil War ===
In Iraq after returning to the country from Syria he was appointed as the governor of ISIL's Northern Baghdad province and fought in Fallujah against Iraqi government forces and allied paramilitaries. He was eventually killed by an airstrike in northern Iraq outside of Mosul.
