= Junud al-Sham =

Islamist Militant Group

- جنود الشام
- Logo of Junud al-Sham
- Leader: Muslim Shishani
- Deputy emir: Abu Turab Shishani
- Deputy emir: Abu Bakr al-Shishani
- Dates active: 2012 – 2021
- Groups: Liwaa Usud al-Islam Artillery and Infantry Battalion (former)
- Headquarters: Jisr al-Shughur
- Active regions: Syria: Aleppo Governorate; Latakia Governorate; Idlib Governorate; Hama Governorate
- Ideology: Sunni Islamism; Salafi jihadism
- Size: 70 (2021 estimate)
- Part of: Battle of Victory
- Wars: the Syrian Civil War

Junud al-Sham (Arabic: جنود الشام, romanized: Junūd ash-Shām, lit. 'Soldiers of the Levant'), sometimes also mistakenly called Jund al-Sham, was initially a group of Chechen and Lebanese Sunni mujahideen that fought in the Syrian Civil War and was led by Muslim Shishani until its disbanding in 2021.

== Background ==
Muslim Shishani fought in the First Chechen War where he served as Ibn al-Khattab's aide. During the Second Chechen War he was in charge of multiple attacks against Russian Forces. He also organised soldiers in Dagestan during the Insurgency in the North Caucasus. According to an interview from 2013, Shishani planned to go to Chechnya after Dagestan, but was unable and instead went to Syria.

== History ==
Shishani traveled to Syria in 2012 at the request of Syrians who needed help training. Initially, the group was known as "the Chechen group", though the name of the group was changed once other nationalities, including Lebanese militants, started to join. In total hundreds of foreign fighters were trained in its camps, including "European, Turkish and Caucasian" militants. A unit of around 30 Germans trained with the group as well. In the early stages of the civil war the group had close contact with both Al-Nusra Front and Islamic State.

The group took part in the 2013 Latakia offensive. During this offensive, Junud al-Sham captured numerous points including the strategic hilltop village of Durin, earning Shishani the nickname Sopka Durin meaning "Durin hilltop" in Russian. Sham Center, an outlet closely aligned with the group, released multiple videos. In one video Muslim talks about the capture of hilltop villages and the fact that they had 60 fighters allocated to the battle but eventually 40 took part in the battle. Sham Center also released another video in which it is said that six people were killed and another nine were wounded from Junud al-Sham. Muslim Shishani is said to be among the wounded.

In late August famous ex-rapper Denis Cuspert, who was part of the group, was wounded in an airstrike with some sources even claiming he was killed. During the same time relations between Junud al-Sham and Islamic State soured, culminating in Denis leaving the group. In October Muslim Shishani took command of a newly formed group after merging his faction with those led by Abu Musa al Shishani and Sayfullakh Shishani respectively.

Following this merger Muslim Shishani was based in Aleppo where he trained soldiers from Sayfullakh's jamaat. During their time in Aleppo they also took part in a battle to capture Aleppo prison in early February 2014. During this battle opposition groups including Nusra Front used a Car bomb (SVBIED) and multiple tanks with infantry support. The attack was repulsed and fighters including Sayfullakh retreated. The retreated fighters were hit by an artillery strike which killed Sayfullakh. Later in March Junud al-Sham participated in the 2014 Latakia offensive. The group was in a coalition with Ahrar al-Sham. During the initial stages of the offensive they had great success capturing swathes of areas in Latakia alongside the Turkish border including the border city of Kessab and the strategic Observatory 45. Later the offensive turned into a stalemate until the Syrian Arab Army (SAA) eventually reversed all gains around the middle of June.

=== Decline ===
Unlike many other foreign mujahideen, Junud al-Sham remained mostly independent from other Syrian rebel groups. Many of its fighters defected to Islamic State of Iraq and the Levant commander Abu Omar al-Shishani in 2014. The remainder of the group remained "combat-ready", and continued to take part in military operations in 2015, one of which was the capture of Jisr as Shughour where the group fought under a coalition alongside the Turkistan Islamic Party, Ahrar al-Sham and many other groups. On 22 April, the first day of the offensive, Muslim Shishani is seen alongside his deputies Abu Turab Shishani and Abu Bakr Shishani in a video published by the group. They are overlooking the city and communicating by radio. Two days later Muslim is seen in the city and on 26 April he is touring the city alongside Abu Bakr al-Shishani and a British fighter.

Financial difficulties caused a further decline with some sources claiming that the group was reduced to merely 30 fighters by early 2016. In a video address, Muslim Shishani consequently reproached other insurgent groups in Syria for not providing assistance, which regional expert Joanna Paraszczuk described as a "rant". The problems were so grave that the deputy of Junud al-Sham, Abu Bakr al-Shishani, left the group in early 2016 to fight alongside Ajnad al-Kavkaz. This continued until he founded his own jama'at in early 2017.

In September 2016, Junud al-Sham travelled to Hama Governorate in order to fight in a local rebel offensive. Later that year, there were reports according to which the group had dissolved, reportedly as result of clashes with Ahrar al-Sham, with many of its Chechen fighters reportedly joining Ajnad al-Kavkaz.

Despite these reports, however, other reports suggested remnants of Junud al-Sham were still active by 2018. In January 2018, pro-government media reported that "a military source in Damascus" said the group took part in a major military campaign against the government in northwestern Syria. Meanwhile, the Turkish newspaper Yeni Akit claimed Shishani was participating in the Turkish military operation in Afrin. However, Shishani denied that he or his followers were in Afrin, and confirmed he was in Hama, fighting alongside another Chechen militia, Tarkhan Gaziyev's Tarkhan's Jamaat. A German foreign fighter with the group named Abu Khalid al-Shami said in an interview from 22 July 2019 that the group clashed with ISIL in Abu Dali Sometime between 2019 and 2021 the group relocated to Jisr as Shugour countryside.

=== Disbandment ===
During the summer of 2021, HTS arrested local criminals who were members of Junud al-Sham. Shishani denied these claims and said that the criminals were not affiliated with the group. Despite this, Junud al-Sham was still ordered by HTS to disband as part of a wider plan to unite all groups under the HTS banner. Later in October, tensions were sparked between HTS and Junud al-Sham due to rumors that the latter would be subject to an offensive operation by HTS to clear out extremist groups from the Turkmen Mountains. In order to calm the situation, HTS sent a delegation to meet with Muslim Shishani to assure his group that Junud al Sham would not the target of the operation, but that Shishani and his fighters did have to leave the area of operations.

Following the withdrawal of Shishani and 70 of his fighters, Junud al-Sham remnants that remained stationed in the area came under attack by HTS during the opening of their operation against Jundullah, a fringe extremist group based out of Idlib and primary target of the HTS operation. That December, the Russian Air Force bombed his residence, killing a bodyguard and their child while failing to kill Shishani.

== See also ==
- List of armed groups in the Syrian Civil War
