= Chechen mujahideen in Syria =

Foreign fighters in Syria

- Russian: Чеченские моджахеды в Сирии; Arabic: المجاهدون الشيشان في سوريا
- Jihadist flag Flag of the Chechen Republic of Ichkeria
- Dates active: since 2011
- Allegiance: Syrian Opposition; Ajnad al-Kavkaz; Al-Nusra Front (2012–2017); Hay'at Tahrir al-Sham (until 2025); Malhama Tactical; Islamic State
- Ideology: Sunni Islamism; Jihadism; Anti-Assadism; Anti-Russian sentiment; North Caucasian separatism
- Size: 200–500

The Chechen mujahideen in Syria (Russian: Чеченские моджахеды в Сирии; Arabic: المجاهدون الشيشان في سوريا; Chechen: Noxçiyn mudƶahidaş Şemaẋ) are ethnic Chechen members of Sunni Islamist armed groups. They are organized into military factions, and took part in the civil war in Syria to fight against the government of Bashar al-Assad on the side of the Syrian opposition and Tahrir al-Sham, also on the side of the Islamic State.

== History ==
The first mention of armed groups of Chechen militants in Syria appeared in a number of media outlets at the end of 2011. In October 2012, some publications wrote that Chechens as part of the Syrian opposition forces of the FSA and Jabhat al-Nusra took part in an attack on the military base of the Syrian army air defense brigade near Aleppo.

Chechen jihadists began arriving in Syria en masse mainly in 2011-2015 from Chechnya, as well as from Europe, where they left during the second Chechen War, fleeing from the war, as well as from the Pankisi Gorge of Georgia, where ethnic Chechens-Kistins, who emigrated there during the Caucasian War.

Chechens occupied the second largest number among the foreign contingent of jihadists in Syria, estimates of their number range from 1,700 to 3,000 people, they played a significant role in the civil war in Syria, and several dozen well-known commanders of Syrian rebels and jihadists were Chechens by origin. Some of them were veterans of the first and second Chechen wars and used their combat experience to train the Syrian opposition and militants. They formed their own armed detachments and jamaats, which were also joined by other militants from the North Caucasus, as well as Syrians and jihadists from all over the Middle East.

According to representatives of the Chechen diaspora in Europe, hundreds of Chechens from Europe went to Syria to fight in the ranks of the Syrian opposition against the government army of Bashar al-Assad.

In June 2013, the leadership of the Chechen Republic officially recognized that up to 1,700 Chechen natives were fighting in the Middle East region. In the same year, according to information disseminated by the militants' Internet resources, as well as in the Russian media, Rustam Gelaev, the son of the famous Chechen commander Ruslan (Khamzat) Gelaev, was killed in Syria. Rustam died fighting on the side of the Syrian opposition.

== Split ==
Chechens mediated in the settlement of the conflict between Jabhat al-Nusra (now — Hayat Tahrir al-Sham) and the Syrian opposition, on the one hand, and with ISIS, on the other. In early November 2014, the leadership of Jaish al-Muhajireen wal-Ansar, represented by Salahuddin Shishani, met with the leadership of ISIS in their capital Raqqa and held talks on reconciliation of the two warring parties. However, the conversation with the leadership of ISIS ended in vain as they chose to continue the conflict. In response to Shishani's proposal to stop the war between Sunni Muslims, in particular with Islamic Jamaats such as Jabhat al-Nusra, Ahrar al-Sham and others, the leadership of ISIS refused and stated that it would not stop fighting these groups, because it considers the emirs of these factions Kafirs and Murtads. After that, Shishani left Raqqa and returned to Idlib.

This conflict was also reflected among the Chechen Mujahideen in Syria, in particular among the Chechen emirs, who had previously acted in alliance with each other. Some of them defected to the Islamic State and took leadership positions, while some remained on the side of Jabhat al-Nusra and the Syrian opposition.

The very history of the conflict between Jabhat al-Nusra and ISIS (at that time, the Islamic State of Iraq) begins in the spring of 2013, when the emir of the Islamic State of Iraq which was Abu Bakr al-Baghdadi decided to expand his organisation into neighbouring Syria and to unite his territories in both the countries of Iraq and Syria. Following this announcement, units of the Islamic State of Iraq (ISI) invaded Syria from the territory of Iraq during the most active phase of the Syrian civil war, when various jihadist groups and the Syrian opposition began to consistently seize cities from the Syrian government army of Bashar al-Assad. The Al-Nusra Front, which was Al-Qaeda's Syrian branch and also sometimes referred to as Al-Qaeda in Syria, together with the Ahrar al-Sham group played a significant role in the capture of the city of Raqqa in eastern Syria in March 2013. However, after the capture of Raqqa, the head of Jabhat al-Nusra, the Syrian wing of Al-Qaeda, which was Abu Mohammad al-Julani expressed his loyalty to the main leader of Al-Qaeda, Ayman al-Zawahiri, and did not recognize the Islamic State of Iraq and Sham proclaimed by the leadership of the ISI, which was emir Abu Bakr al-Baghdadi, in the territory controlled by Jabhat al-Nusra. After that, in February 2014, a large-scale war for spheres of influence in Syria began between the various jihadist groups.

== Commanders ==
Supporters of the «Sunni opposition of Syria»

- Abu Abdurrahman Shishani
- Abdul-Malik Shishani
- Abdul-Hakim Shishani
- Hamza Shishani
- Abu Al-Bara al-Kavkazi
- Muslim Shishani
- Abu Turab Shishani
- Umar Shishani
- Tarkhan Gaziev
- Sayfullakh Shishani
- Salahuddin Shishani
- Hayrullah Shishani
- Sayful-Islam Shishani
- Naib Shishani
- Mohannad Shishani
- Muhammad Shishani
- Al Bara Shishani
- Abu Bakr Shishani
- Halid Shishani
- Ali Shishani
- Abu Musa al Shishani

ISIS supporters

- Abu Omar al-Shishani
- Abu Sayfullah Shishani
- Abu Said Shishani
- Ahmad Shishani
- Abu Abdullah Shishani
- Al Bara Shishani
- Abu Ibrahim Shishani
- Abu Umar Grozny
- Musa Abu Yusuf Shishani
- Hayrullah Shishani
- Abdullah Shishani
- Abu Hafs Shishani
- Adam Shishani
- Abdul-Halim Shishani
- Hattab Shishani
- Abdullah Abu Muhammad Shishani
- Abdul-Vahhab Shishani
- Muhammad Shishani
- Abu Hisham Shishani
- Abu Anas Shishani
- Abu Shamil Shishani
- Jundullah Shishani

== Literature ==
In English

- The Syrian Jihad : Al-Qaeda, the Islamic state and the evolution of an insurgency
- Cecire, Michael (2016). "Same sides of different coins: contrasting militant activisms between Georgian fighters in Syria and Ukraine". Caucasus Survey. Brill Deutschland GmbH. 4 (3): 282–295. doi:10.1080/23761199.2016.1231382. ISSN 2376-1199.
- Vera Mironova. From Freedom Fighters to Jihadists: Human Resources of Non-State Armed Groups. — Oxford University Press, 2019-05-20. — 345 с. — ISBN 978-0-19-093978-6.
- The Syrian Jihad: Al-Qaeda, the Islamic State and the Evolution of an Insurgency
- Pokalova, Elena. Georgia, Terrorism, and Foreign Fighters
- Assessing Terrorism in the Caucasus and the Threat to the Homeland: Hearing

In Russian

- Майкл Вайс, Хасан Хасан. Исламское государство: Армия террора. — Альпина Паблишер, 2015-11-03. — 346 с. — ISBN 978-5-9614-4068-3.
- Даша Никольсон. Иностранные боевики-террористы с Северного Кавказа: понимание влияния Исламского государства в этом регионе // Connections: The Quarterly Journal. — 2017. — Т. 16, вып. 4
- Манойло А.В. «Русская весна» в Сирии // Мировая политика. — 2015–04. — Т. 4, вып. 4. — С. 1–26. — ISSN 2409-8671 | doi:10.7256/2409-8671.2015.4.17318

== See also ==
- Afghan mujahideen
- Bosnian mujahideen
- Kurdish Mujahideen
- Chechen Mujahideen
- Indian Mujahideen
- Mujahideen
