= Ansar al-Sham =

Syrian Islamist Rebel organization

Kata'ib Ansar al-Sham Supporters of the Levant Brigades
- Arabic: كتائب أنصار الشام
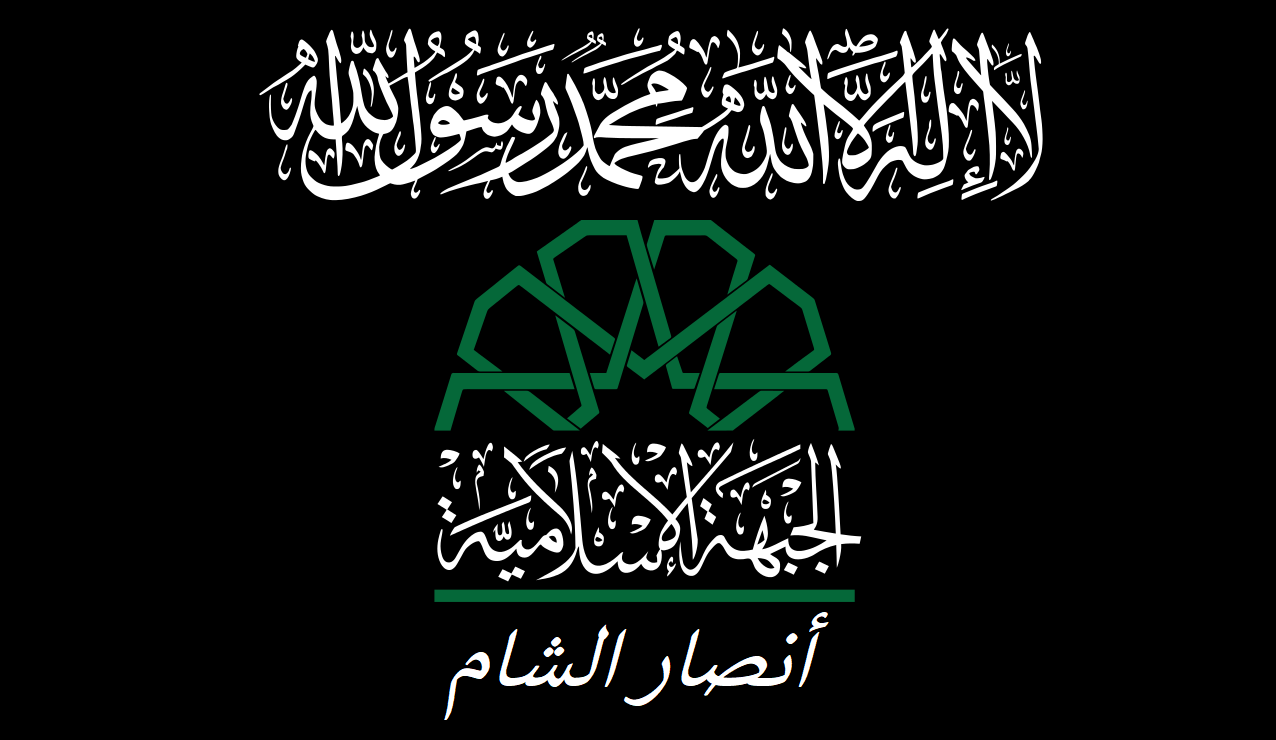
- Ansar al-Sham Logo Flag of Ansar al-Sham
- Leaders: Abu Omar al-Jamil (overall leader); Abu Musa al Shishani (military commander)
- Dates active: September 2012 – 2018
- Group: al-Zahir Baybars Battalion
- Headquarters: Jabal al-Akrad, Latakia Governorate
- Active regions: Latakia Governorate; Idlib Governorate
- Ideology: Sunni Islamism; Salafism; Jihadism
- Size: 2,500 (March 2014)
- Part of: Syrian Islamic Front (December 2012 – November 2013); Islamic Front (November 2013-March 2015); Jaysh al-Islam (December 2016–January 2017; Ahrar al-Sham (January–February 2017); Hay'at Tahrir al-Sham (February 2017–August 2018)

Kata'ib Ansar al-Sham (Arabic: كتائب أنصار الشام, Supporters of the Levant Brigades) was an armed Sunni Islamist rebel group active in the Syrian Civil War, mainly fighting against Syrian government forces.

== Background ==
Founded in September 2012 by a Latakian veteran of the Soviet–Afghan War known as Abu Omar al-Jamil, Ansar al-Sham brought together a wide range of mostly Syrian fighters in northern Latakia Governorate on a conservative Sunni Islamist platform. The group's military leader is a Chechen known as Abu Musa al Shishani. As of March 2014, Ansar al-Sham fighters each receive a $60 salary every month. The group primary recruits local Syrians but is also open to foreign fighters willing to join the group, most of its members have been described as a mix of Syrian Army defectors, shopkeepers, and farmers. The group also allegedly received funding from Saudi Arabia, however in 2015 Saudi Arabia considered listing the group as a terrorist organization. During the 2014 Latakia offensive the Free Syrian Army reportedly gave the group $500,000 to support the group.

=== Ideology ===
The group has the goal of overthrowing the Syrian Government and establishing an Islamic state in its place, though the group does have an Islamist ideology it has been described as vague compared to other factions in the country including allies of the group such as Ahrar al-Sham. The vagueness of the group's ideology has helped it recruit Sunni Syrians from several backgrounds with wide ranges of beliefs.

=== Relations with other groups ===
According to one of the group's commanders it does not work directly with the Free Syrian Army, but cooperates with FSA commanders on local levels when needed, and it does not fight against the FSA either. Many commanders of the group condemned the Islamic State of Iraq and the Levant for one of its commanders killing an FSA commander that the group was allied with, and also held tensions with ISIL, however the group did not cut ties with ISIL, as many members of Ansar al-Sham had familial ties to ISIL members in Latakia and many ISIL members in the area were former Ansar al-Sham members. After the incident in which the ISIL commander known as Abu Ayman al-Iraqi killed the FSA commander, Ansar al-Sham's military commander Abu Musa al Shishani along with Muslim Shishani the leader of Junud al-Sham, and Sayfullakh Shishani, a commander in Jaish al-Muhajireen wal-Ansar, helped mediate the tensions between the FSA and ISIL preventing an armed confrontation between the two in late 2013.

Ansar al-Sham also held good relations with the Syrian branch of al-Qaeda, Jabhat al-Nusra and favored its approach of overthrowing the Syrian government before establishing an Islamic government in contrast to ISIL's approach. Along with having positive ties to al-Nusra the group also held a good relationship with Harakat Sham al-Islam which was composed Moroccan fighters, and another group known as the Ansar al-Mujahedin Battalion.

== History ==
In December 2012, Ansar al-Sham joined with other Sunni Islamist and Salafist groups to found the Syrian Islamic Front umbrella organisation, in November 2013 the SIF was dissolved and Liwa al-Haqq, Ansar al-Sham and Ahrar ash-Sham joined the broader Islamic Front alliance.

Ansar al-Sham played a lead role in the 2014 Latakia offensive against government forces.

On 15 December 2016, the group declared that it decided to completely merge under Jaysh al-Islam's Idlib branch. On 25 January 2017, Jaysh al-Islam's Idlib branch joined Ahrar al-Sham, thus Ansar al-Sham also joined.

On 7 February 2017, Ansar al-Sham defected from Ahrar al-Sham to join Tahrir al-Sham (HTS).

At dawn on 23 August 2018, Tahrir al-Sham and Turkistan Islamic Party fighters raided Ansar al-Sham's headquarters and positions in the northern Latakia mountains and the countryside west of Jisr al-Shughur. Clashes took place and Ansar al-Sham commanders refused to fight, handing over their headquarters, which contained a large amount of weapons and ammunition, to HTS.

== See also ==
- List of armed groups in the Syrian Civil War
