= Al-Maghrabi =

Arabic language surname

Al-Maghribi, Al-Maghrabi, El Maghrabi, El-Maghrabi, also Al-Maghrebi (Arabic: المغربي), is an Arabic language surname common in the Arab World, and it mainly denotes an origin and ancestry from Morocco. To a lesser extent it can also denotes an origin from the broader Maghreb region. Notable people with the surname include:

== Al-Maghribi ==
- Ibn Yaḥyā al-Maghribī al-Samawʾal, mathematician and astronomer of the 12th century.
- Muḥyi al-Dīn al-Maghribī (1220–1283), an Arab astronomer
- Mahmud Sulayman al-Maghribi, former prime minister of Libya
- Yusuf al-Maghribi, a 17th-century lexicographer active in Cairo.
- Ibn Said al-Maghribi, a famous geographer, historian and the most important collector of poetry from al-Andalus in the 12th and 13th centuries.

== Al-Maghrabi ==
- Khaled Al-Maghrabi (born 1992), Saudi Arabian football player
- Muhammad Al Maghrabi (born 1985), Libyan footballer

== El Maghrabi ==
- Ahmed El Maghrabi (born 1945), Egyptian businessman and politician
- Mohamed El Maghrabi (born 2001), Egyptian footballer

== El-Maghrabi ==
- Khalil Amira El-Maghrabi (1914–1976), Egyptian boxer

== Elmaghrabi ==
- Jomana Elmaghrabi (born 1995), Egyptian synchronized swimmer

== Al-Maghrebi ==
- Abu Usamah al-Maghrebi (1986–2014), senior military commander of the Islamic State of Iraq
- Ismael Al-Maghrebi (born 1991), Saudi Arabian football playe
