= Muslim Shishani =

Chechen commander in Syria (born 1972)

Murat Akhmetovich Margoshvili
- Muslim Shishani in 2021
- Nicknames: Muslim Shishani; Muslim al Shishani; Muslim Abu Walid al Shishani
- Born: 26 May 1972 (age 54); Duisi, Georgian SSR, Soviet Union (now Georgia)
- Allegiance: Soviet Union; Chechen Republic of Ichkeria; Junud al-Sham; Caucasus Emirate; (Georgia (country)) Republic of Georgia
- Conflicts: First Chechen War: Second Chechen War; Second Battle of Grozny; Battle of Vedeno; Insurgency in the North Caucasus; Syrian Civil War; Battle of Aleppo; 2013 Latakia offensive; 2014 Latakia offensive; Northwestern Syria offensive (April–June 2015); Northwestern Syria campaign (October 2017-February 2018); Northwestern Syria offensive (April–August 2019); Northwestern Syria offensive (December 2019-March 2020)

Murat Akhmetovich Margoshvili (born 26 May 1972), also known by his nisba Muslim Shishani or Muslim Abu Walid al Shishani (taken from the Saudi fighter Abu al-Walid), was the emir of the defunct Junud al-Sham group in Syria and is one of the Chechen mujahideen in Syria.

== Early life ==
Shishani is a Georgian national belonging to the Kist people, a Chechen subethnos residing in the Pankisi Gorge. He was born into a poor family and did not attend any local schools, becoming a shepherd instead. Later in childhood, his family moved to the Russian SSR, where he finished basic education and served in the Soviet Army. The family moved back to the Pankisi Gorge and later to the Chechen-Ingush ASSR to settle in Grozny, the capital of Chechnya, where Shishani worked in construction before the outbreak of the First Chechen War.

== North Caucasus wars ==
He joined a group led by the Saudi-born pan-Islamist Ibn Khattab in 1995.

Following the outbreak of the Second Chechen War in 1999, was severely wounded during the Second Battle of Grozny. After healing from his wounds, he participated in the Battle of Vedeno alongside many other battles. He served as Khattab's aide. A few years later he was promoted to emir of Vedeno. After the death of Ibn Khattab, he also served with Abu al-Walid in Chechnya.

Shishani was appointed emir of the Sunzhensky District of Ingushetia on 11 May 2003 at a shura council meeting by Dokka Umarov, Shamil Basayev, Ruslan Gelayev, Vakha Arsanov, Abdul-Malik Mezhidov, and Abu al-Walid. He was in charge of multiple attacks against Russian forces in Ingushetia in 2003. An ambush near Galashki on 30 July employing a remote IED killed five Russian servicemen and another attack on 7 August, utilizing an RPG-18 and machine guns, near Nesterovskaya, killed six Russian servicemen.

He was arrested that same year on 7 October with a Russian passport by the name of Murad Madaev. The authorities only found out his real identity weeks later. According to Memorial, a Russian human rights organization, he and four other companions were abducted in Ordzhonikidzevskaya. He was eventually found jailed in Vladikavkaz. Shishani was "convicted of involvement in an illegal armed group" in 2004, though he was acquitted of arms smuggling charges. In February 2006 Shishani was acquitted on all charges by the Supreme Court of Ingushetia and quickly left the courthouse; afterwards the courthouse was "besieged" by agents who his Moscow Bar Association lawyer suspected to be part of the Federal Security Service (FSB).

During the Russo-Georgian War, a group that included Shishani notified the Georgian government that they had prepared 250 people in the gorge to fight against Russia but the war ended before they were called upon.

In 2008, he traveled to Dagestan and organized militants there as part of the Caucasus Emirate. Shishani was a prominent figure in the Caucasus Emirate where he mainly trained soldiers. His presence opened up a passage for fighters from Georgia to travel to Dagestan. He continued training soldiers in Dagestan until a month and a half before the Lopota incident which happened around mid-2012. After this, Shishani moved back to Georgia and tried multiple times to enter Chechnya and once he realised it was impossible, he went through Turkey to Syria.

== Syrian civil war ==
=== Junud al-Sham ===
Shishani established Junud al-Sham in 2012. Shishani's group first took part in active conflict during the 2013 Latakia offensive. During this offensive, Junud al-Sham captured numerous points including the strategic hilltop village of Durin, earning Shishani the nickname Sopka Durin meaning "Durin hilltop" in Russian. According to Sham Center, an outlet closely linked to Junud al-Sham, Muslim Shishani was wounded as a result of the battles. Later in October, Muslim Shishani, Abu Musa al Shishani and Sayfullakh Shishani merged their groups, which came under Muslim Shishani's command.

Following this merger, Shishani was in Aleppo, where he trained fighters associated with Sayfullakh Shishani's jamaat. In Aleppo they took part in a battle to capture the prison in early February 2014. Al-Nusra Front used a Car bomb (SVBIED) and multiple tanks with infantry support during the battle. The attack was repulsed and fighters including Sayfullakh retreated. The retreating fighters were hit by an artillery strike which killed Sayfullakh.

The group took part in the 2014 Latakia offensive in a coalition with Ahrar al-Sham, capturing several key points along the Turkish border including the strategic Observatory 45 and the border town of Kessab. Eventually the rebel coalition were defeated in the middle of June due to Syrian Arab Armed Forces (SAA) attacks, reversing all rebel gains. In September of that year, Shishani was sanctioned by the US State Department for reportedly building a base for jihadist foreign fighters in Syria. Shishani was also in contact with Tarkhan Batirashvili (Abu Omar al-Shishani) before he joined Islamic State (ISIS). After joining ISIS, Abu Omar was approached by Muslim Shishani to attempt to persuade him that "the brutality of ISIS had nothing to do with Islam." Shishani blamed Batirashvili's inexperience for joining the group.

Shishani also played a role in the capture of Jisr as Shughour as part of the Battle of Victory coalition, which included Ahrar al-Sham, Turkistan Islamic Party in Syria and many other groups. On 22 April, the first day of the offensive, he is seen alongside his deputies Abu Turab al-Shishani and Abu Bakr al-Shishani. They are overlooking the city and communicating by radio. Two days later Shishani is seen in the city and on 26 April he is touring the city alongside Abu Bakr al-Shishani and a British fighter.

According to the Turkish newspaper Yeni Akit, Shishani participated in the 2018 Turkish offensive. He denied this and said that his group was in the Hama countryside during the SAA offensive. In an interview from October 2018 he stressed the importance of Muslims needing to fund jihad. He also mentioned that there were injustices in many groups in Syria and that these groups regularly fought each other. He mentioned that this infighting could have been remedied if fighters were brought together and were financially supported. Later on in the interview he envisioned that "the Ummah will soon rejoice over our victories." At the end of the interview he advises the Mujahideen in Syria to be patient and prepare for the next round of jihad.

Junud al-Sham returned to the Latakia front after the 2018 offensive. They took part in many local battles during the broader Syrian Army offensives like the Battle of Kabanah, where loyalist attacks were repelled. Their military activities lasted up to the 2020 ceasefire.

Shishani was also seen in a video from early 2019 encouraging people to donate to militants.

=== Decline and disbandment ===
In 2021, members from Junud al-Sham were involved in numerous criminal activities and used the group as cover to evade conviction. Hay'at Tahrir al-Sham (HTS) demanded Shishani cooperate to get the criminals arrested. Shishani released a statement saying that the criminals were not in the group when the crimes were committed. He also clarified that he was asked to dismantle Junud al-Sham and leave Idlib after a summons from the HTS-affiliated General Security Service on 22 June. HTS affiliated media released a video on 8 July where it is claimed that the group did not fight during heavy offensives in 2015 and 2016. Furthermore, criminals purportedly belonging to Junud al-Sham said that they were members of the group. Following this, Shishani disbanded the group on 8 July and the group left their positions near Tuffahiyeh, which were taken over by the Turkistan Islamic Party.

In October 2021, there were clashes in the Bayirbucak Turkmen Mountain region between Jundallah and HTS. Shishani was allied with Jundullah but was forced to abandon them after learning that HTS was mobilising troops to fight Jundullah. He left the area of conflict with 70 soldiers. Shishani later settled with his family near the Christian village of Al-Yacoubiyah in the Jisr ash-Shughur countryside. That December, the Russian Air Force bombed his residence, killing a bodyguard and their child while failing to kill Shishani.
