= Abu Dali =

Abu Dali, or Abudali (Arabic: أبو دالي), can refer to the following places:

- Abu Dali, Hama, a village in the Hama Governorate, Syria
- Abu Dali, Homs, a village in the Homs Governorate, Syria
- Abu Dali, Idlib, a village in the Idlib Governorate, Syria
