= Al Bara Shishani =

Georgian militant

- Born: Omalo, Georgia

Cezar Tokhosashvili, known by his nom de guerre Al Bara Shishani, is a Georgian militant and Islamic State leader.

== Early life ==
He was born Cezar Tokhosashvili in the village of Omalo in the Pankisi Gorge, Georgia.

== Militant activities ==
He repeatedly fought alongside Osama bin Laden in Afghanistan.

He headed the Group of the One and Only, a small jihadist group in Syria, which was launched in late July 2014, and was injured in a March 2015 battle that took place near Handarat.

Sometime later, he defected to the Islamic State, where he served as a deputy to Abu Omar al-Shishani. He escaped from Raqqa with his wife and children following its capture in 2017. Shishani moved to Turkey in 2016 following al-Shishani's death and moved to Ukraine two years later using false documents and "coordinated ISIS activities" for over a year. Shishani was reported killed in August 2017 by Georgian media outlets, though his family confirmed the following month that he was alive.

He was reportedly the "military emir" of Liwa al-Muhajireen wal-Ansar in Syria.

== Capture and extradition ==
He was captured in a joint CIA, Security Service of Ukraine and Georgian Intelligence Service operation, which took place in Kyiv Oblast in mid-November 2019. Shishani was detained in Ukraine and was held until he was extradited to Tbilisi, Georgia the following May.
