= 2013 Latakia offensive =

Campaign during the Syrian Civil War

- Part of the Syrian Civil War
- The situation in the Latakia Governorate in August 2013 Syrian Army control Opposition control
Date	4–19 August 2013 (2 weeks and 1 day)
Location	Latakia Governorate, Syria
Result	Syrian government victory: Rebel forces initially captured 13 villages; Syrian government forces counter-attack recaptures all of the villages; Militants killed at least 190 civilians and took more than 200 as hostages

Belligerents
Free Syrian Army; Syrian Islamic Front; Al-Nusra Front; Junud al-Sham; Harakat Sham al-Islam; Islamic State of Iraq and the Levant	(Syria) Syrian Arab Republic

Commanders and leaders
Walid Aouss † (Rejal Ahoudou Allah leader) (Syrian opposition) Kahtane Haaj Mohammed † (al-Tawhid Brigade commander); Ans Chyghani † (Al Izzatullah wal nasr minAllah Brigade commander); Abu Moaz (Ahrar al-Sham commander); Abu Mustafa (Ansar al-Din commander); Muslim Shishani (Junud al-Sham commander); Haji Bakr (ISIL leader) (Syrian opposition) Abu al-Hassan Ammar † (FSA spokesman); Abu Mohammed al-Halabi	Hilal al-Assad (Latakia NDF commander); Nizar al-Khatib † (Tartus NDF commander); Mihraç Ural (Syrian Resistance commander)

Units involved
Free Syrian Army; Latakia Military Council; Al-Tawhid Brigade; Ansar al-Aqida; Syrian Islamic Front; Ahrar ash-Sham; Ansar al-Sham; Al-Nusra Front; Suqour al-Ezz; Islamic State of Iraq and the Levant; Katibat al Muhajireen	Syrian Armed Forces; Syrian Army; 1st Armoured Division; 58th Mechanized Brigade; 3rd Armoured Division; 47th Armoured Brigade; National Defense Force; Syrian Air Force; Military Intelligence Directorate; Syrian Resistance

Strength
1,500–2,000 fighters: 1,500 ISIL fighters; 40 fighters from Junud al-Sham (Muslim Shishani's claim	5,000 soldiers

Casualties and losses
107 fighters killed (up until Army counter-attack): 6 killed and 9 wounded from Junud al-Sham	114–127 soldiers and 44 militiamen killed
- 190–205 civilians killed

The 2013 Latakia offensive (called The Descendants of Aisha, Mother of the Believers by Salafi jihadists, and the Operation Liberation of the Coast by the Free Syrian Army and its supporters) was a campaign during the Syrian Civil War launched by rebel groups led by Salafi jihadists in the Latakia Governorate. The stated aim of the offensive was to conquer al-Haffah city, but government supporters assumed conquering Mount Nabi Younes was more likely the real aim. A calculated side effect may have been to spark more sectarian violence in Syria by carrying out a sectarian attack on an Alawite-majority area. The offensive began in early August 2013. During the campaign, rebel forces captured a dozen villages. However, in mid-August, the military counter-attacked and recaptured all of the territory previously lost to the rebels.

== Offensive ==
=== Rebel advance ===
On 4 August 2013, an estimated 1,500 to 2,000 rebel fighters, 300 of them foreigners, launched an offensive from the rebel-held town of Salma further into the predominantly pro-government Alawite Latakia province. The offensive started with a rebel attack on 10 Alawite villages in the Jabal al-Akrad mountain area. Rebel tanks were also deployed, firing on the villages. Throughout the day, ambulances rushed wounded government fighters to Latakia city from the frontline. As for rebel casualties, Tunisians, Libyans, Saudis, and Jordanians were among those reported killed in the initial attacks. In one instance during the fighting, a foreign rebel suicide-bomber detonated his car killing at least 15 NDF militiamen and Army soldiers. By the end of the first day of fighting, rebels had seized five villages and captured 400 Alawite villagers and pro-government militiamen, including a pro-government Alawite cleric, Badr Ghazal. Hundreds of Alawite civilians fled to Latakia.

On 5 August 2013, rebels further advanced to the outskirts of the Alawite village of Aramo, 20 km from Qardaha, President Bashar al-Assad's hometown, which also contains the mausoleum of Assad's father, Hafez al-Assad. Rebel forces were using freshly supplied anti-tank missiles to a reportedly devastating effect, with one opposition activist claiming three Army tanks were destroyed on a hilltop overlooking Salma. Later, it was reported that opposition forces had captured Aramo, along with one other village. Rebels also made attempts to advance in the Jabal Turkman mountain area. However, during the second day of the fighting, government forces launched a counter-attack and managed to recapture one of the five villages they lost the previous day, Beit al-Shakuhi. The counter-attack came as fresh government reinforcements started to arrive in an attempt to push back the rebels.

While the rebel offensive was praised by some of their sympathizers, others were opposed to opening up the front, with one opposition activist noting that the rebels "have a habit of escalating without preparing as soon as they feel they have enough weapons. But they are not ready... and the regime's response will be crazy." The United States, a main backer of the FSA, was against targeting Latakia because it could spark revenge attacks by Alawites against its majority Sunni population and increase the flow of refugees. Other foreign diplomats said the coastal area and its mountain villages could be the scene of a bloodbath against the Alawites if Islamist radicals end up eventually gaining the upper hand.

On 6 August 2013, the opposition activist group the SOHR claimed that rebels had overrun 11 Alawite villages in the previous three days. A security source played down the report saying that only two villages were still rebel-held after an Army counter-attack. SOHR also reported that a number of executions had been conducted during the course of the offensive. Four hilltop military posts that were shelling rebel-held villages were also reportedly captured by opposition forces.

On 7 August 2013, an Alawite cleric confirmed 13 villages were captured by rebel forces but stated that six of them had already been recaptured by the Army the previous day. He also claimed that the rebels killed more than 100 people in sectarian massacres against the villagers, most of them women and children. Two days later, SOHR confirmed that dozens of Alawite civilians had been killed in the area. Other activists also reported 60 civilians had been killed in the offensive.

On 9 August 2013, opposition activists reported that FSA commanders had issued orders to their battalions in the province to halt their advances and retreat from villages they had captured, the reason being that arms supplies to the rebels had been halted in the previous hours. However, senior FSA sources denied that a retreat order was issued. One opposition activist stated that rebel fighters actually rejected the FSA's request to retreat due to the arms shortage and resorted to using the ammunition they seized from government forces during the fighting. Later during the day, the Syrian Army attacked three villages, with state media claiming the military managed to recapture all three. However, activists stated government forces managed to recapture one village, Qashba, while fighting was still ongoing in the other two. Rebel forces, in turn, claimed in an online video to have managed to capture the village of Kharratah, three kilometers south of Salma. However, the village had already been confirmed as captured by rebel forces at the start of the offensive days earlier. During the night, several air-strikes hit Salma killing 20 people. 10 of them were rebel fighters, including four foreigners, and 10 were civilians.

By 11 August, reports emerged of mass civilian killings by rebel forces in the captured Alawite villages, as well as the abduction of hundreds of others.

=== Army counter-attack ===
On 16 August 2013, the military launched a counter-attack, reportedly quickly capturing two villages.

On 18 August 2013, the Syrian Army claimed to have recaptured nine villages over the previous two days. An opposition activist confirmed that the rebels lost seven villages, but stated that they managed to once again capture five of them. Later, the SOHR acknowledged that the military made gains and recaptured several Alawite villages during the day. They added that the Army killed scores of foreign fighters, including a Libyan emir of the al-Qaeda-linked group Islamic State of Iraq and the Levant. The air force bombarded rebel positions in the Jabal al-Akrad mountains, during which a fighter jet was reportedly shot down and its pilot captured by the rebels.

On 19 August 2013, state media reported that the Army recaptured all rebel-held positions in Latakia after capturing the Nabi Ashia mountain range and adjoining areas in the north of the province. According to a security source, the only remaining rebel-held area was in and around the town of Salma, from which the rebels launched their offensive. Opposition activists confirmed the Army recaptured nine Alawite villages, but stated that fighting was still ongoing in two more. Government troops had also retaken all of the military observation posts which rebels seized at the start of their offensive. It was later confirmed that all of the villages had been recaptured by the military.

=== Rebel massacre of civilians ===
On 26 August 2013, the SOHR reported that the kidnapped Alawite cleric, Badr Ghazal, had been executed by the Al-Nusra Front.

More than a month after the offensive had ended, additional reports emerged of civilian killings by rebel fighters. According to one report, two mass graves were found. Kidnapped women were also reportedly shipped off in trucks to be raped by rebel fighters. 62–140 civilians were estimated in the report to have been massacred, with another 105–199 missing or confirmed as kidnapped.

On 11 October 2013, Human Rights Watch (HRW) released a report which stated that, after an investigation, they found grave violations of human rights by opposition forces, including executions, unlawful killings, and hostage-taking. The report documented 190 civilians killed by rebel forces, including at least 67 of the victims who were executed or unlawfully killed, though it noted that number of victims was likely higher.

HRW stated that most of those killed were either intentionally or indiscriminately killed by opposition forces, with often clear sectarian motivations. More than 200 hostages, primarily women and children, continued to be held by Islamist forces. It notes that the pattern of abuses and killings by rebel forces in these incidents rose to legal category of both war crimes and crimes against humanity.

The report found that two Kuwaiti nationals, Sheikh Hajjej al-Ajami and Shafi al-Ajami, had a prominent role in collecting financial resources for the operation.

== See also ==
- 2014 Latakia offensive
- 2025 massacres of Syrian Alawites
