= 2014 Latakia offensive =

Syrian rebel offensive

Coordinates: 35.9333°N 35.9833°E

- Part of the Syrian civil war
- Syrian government control Syrian opposition control
Date	21 March – 15 June 2014 (2 months, 3 weeks and 4 days)
Location	Latakia Governorate, Syria
Result	Syrian government victory

Belligerents
Free Syrian Army; Islamic Front; Al-Nusra Front; Junud al-Sham; Harakat Sham al-Islam; Supported by: Turkey; United States	(Syria) Syrian Arab Republic; Syrian Resistance; Ba'ath Brigades; Hezbollah

Commanders and leaders
Unknown top provincial Al-Nusra commander † (Nusra Front commander); Abu Ahmed al-Turkmani (Nusra Front commander); Muslim Shishani (Junud al-Sham commander); Abu Musa al Shishani (Ansar al-Sham commander); Abu al Hassan (Ahrar ash-Sham commander); Ibrahim Bin Shakaran † (Harakat Sham al-Islam commander); Abu Safiya Al-Masri † (Harakat Sham al-Islam deputy commander) (Syrian opposition) Brig. Gen. Abdul-Ilah al-Bashir (FSA Chief of staff) (Syrian opposition) Anas Abu Malik (Latakia FSA commander)	Lt. Gen. Ali Abdullah Ayyoub (Army Chief of staff); Hilal al-Assad † (Latakia NDF commander); Mihraç Ural (Syrian Resistance commander); Hussam Khadra † (Latakia Ba'ath Brigades commander) (Ba'athist Syria) Col. Samuel Ghannum † (Observatory 45 commander)

Units involved
Free Syrian Army; Syrian Turkmen Brigades; Islamic Front; Ahrar ash-Sham; Ansar al-Sham	Syrian Armed Forces; Syrian Army; Suqur al-Sahara; National Defense Forces

Strength
4,000 fighters	Unknown

Casualties and losses
582 killed (opposition claim) 2,700 killed and 5,635 wounded (government claim; by 30 March)	571 killed (opposition claim) 50 killed (government claim; by 26 March) 1 MiG-23 shot down by Turkish Air Force
- 11 civilians killed

The 2014 Latakia offensive was a rebel offensive in the Latakia Governorate of Syria launched on 21 March 2014 by rebel Islamist groups including Al-Nusra Front, which called the offensive "Anfal", while a coalition of Supreme Military Council rebel groups called the offensive "The Martyrs Mothers". The objectives of the offensive have been stated to be the taking over of all strategic observatories, government villages and the Mediterranean coast. Observers have stated a strategic aim was to force the Syrian army to redeploy forces to Latakia, which would relieve pressure on other rebels elsewhere in Syria. They reportedly succeeded in this with government forces being sent from Idlib, Hama and Aleppo to bolster defenses.

During the offensive the Syrian military was joined by Hezbollah, Iraqi Shi'ite militia and Iranian military advisers. After almost two months of fighting, the offensive stalled and eventually petered out, with rebels losing most of their early gains. However, the rebels' established strategic bridgehead consisting of the town of Kessab and nearby territory remained. By mid-June a new advance by government forces recaptured the last rebel gains of the campaign, including Kessab.

The offensive resulted in the displacement of the native ethnic Armenians of the town of Kessab, who make up 70% of its population.

== Background ==
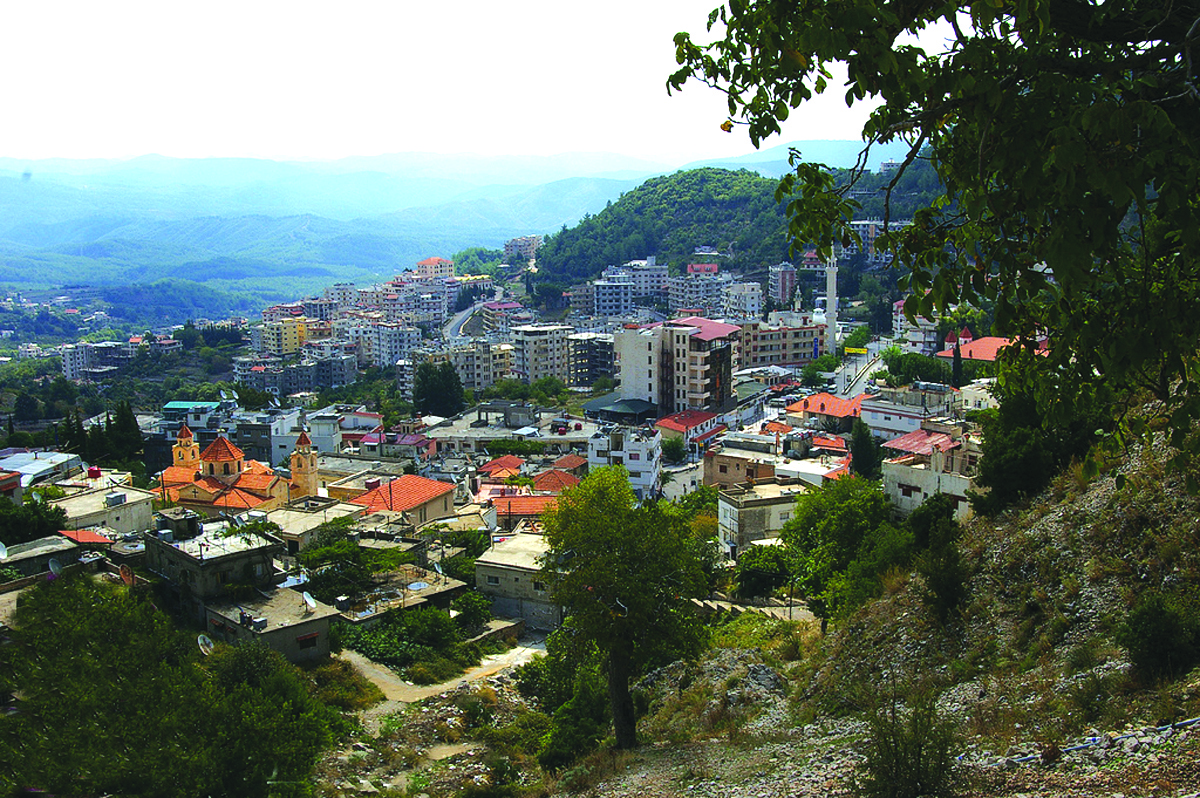
Kessab in 2010

The Armenians of Kessab were previously victims of Turkish violence during the Hamidian massacres, Adana massacres and the Armenian genocide, last two of which took place in the last century and involved the massacre of two millions of Armenians.

Three days before the assault on Kessab, the leader of Turkey's opposition Republican People's Party (CHP), Kemal Kilicdaroglu, called on Chief of General Staff General Necdet Ozel "not to embark on an adventure" with a military intervention in Syria, saying that "He [Prime Minister Recep Tayyip Erdogan] could decide to move the army into Syria before the elections."

Kessab was the only city bordering Turkey that was controlled by the Syrian government. Syrian-Armenian war correspondent Sarkis Kassargian believes taking control of Kessab means taking control of the border crossing with Turkey, which allows anti-government fighters to advance toward the coastline, and in turn strengthen their position on the ground. In addition, the alleged capture of Samra village by rebel forces grants them access to the highest point in the village. Abdoullah Ali, an expert on Islamic groups in Syria, confirmed the takeover was headed by Abou Mousa al-Chechani (Chechnyan), among other senior and experienced fighters who had previously fought in Afghanistan, Bosnia, Chechnya and Iraq, thus indicating the importance of this battle.

Human Rights Watch Syria and Lebanon researcher Lama Fakih told the UK Telegraph rebel groups had wanted to attack Kassab for a long time, but Turkey had previously denied them access, citing a lack of unity.

== Offensive ==
=== Initial rebel advance ===
An Ahrar al-Sham BM-21 Grad launch during the offensive

In the early hours of 21 March 2014, rebel fighters led by the al-Nusra Front advanced from inside Turkish territory and attacked the Kasab border crossing with Turkey. The fighters reportedly crossed into Syria from the Turkish village of Gözlekçiler. Subsequently, the civilian populations of Kessab and its surrounding villages either fled or were evacuated, with most seeking safety in Latakia, as Kessab remained under the control of rebel groups.

The rebel fighters initially managed to capture guard posts around the crossing but not the crossing itself. The also captured the nearby Al-Sakhra hill and a police station and directed mortar fire from the hill at the crossing and at the nearby Alawite village of Karsana, killing five people including a child. The leader of Al-Nusra for Latakia province was killed during the fighting. Rebels had also captured the Jabal al-Nisr mountain, but it was recaptured by the military within hours.

By 22 March, the rebels managed to capture the Kasab crossing, while Kesab town remained under government control and fighting was still continuing around both of them. Government forces launched a counter-attack in an attempt to recapture the crossing and a security source stated the Army had retaken the previous day two police stations that were seized by the rebels. According to the opposition activist group the SOHR, rebels at the crossing had been targeted by government troops since the previous day. In the meantime, rebels directed their attacks against a strategic hill known as Observatory 45, which they captured later in the day. Overall, the SOHR reported fighting in three government-held villages that were coming under a rebel attack and three rebel-held villages which the Army was trying to capture. As fighting spread to other villages, the military responded with air strikes and ambushes which left 20 rebels dead and 30 wounded around Observatory Kherbah Solas.

On 23 March, Turkish Air Force F-16 jet fighters shot down a Syrian warplane that allegedly bombed rebels fighting around the border post. The pilot ejected safely, according to a Syrian military spokesman, who also claimed that the plane was in Syrian airspace; Turkish officials, however, claimed it violated their airspace.

Meanwhile, significant military reinforcements were sent to the border area. Rebels also launched a new attack against the village of Kherbah Solas, about 25 kilometers south of Kasab. Opposition sources claimed that over 20 soldiers surrendered to the rebels in the village of Nab Al-Murr after a three-hour siege on a building.

Later during the day, government forces recaptured Observatory 45 and secured the village of Al-Samra, while rebels captured the village of Al-Nab'in and the surroundings of Jabal al-Nisr, which forced the Army to evacuate it. However, the rebels were not able to capture the top of Jabal al-Nisr itself due to the Army's control of Observatory 45, which is the highest point in the region and oversees Jabal al-Nisr. During the day's fighting, the NDF commander of Latakia province, Hilal al-Assad, and seven pro-government militiamen were killed in fighting in Kasab. According to the rebel Islamic Front, he was killed when they used Grad rockets to hit a scheduled meeting of pro-government militia leaders in Latakia city.

On 24 March, according to the SOHR, rebels were in control of the village of Kasab, after capturing the main square the previous day, with fighting continuing in the town's outskirts, specifically the hills outside the center of Kasab. However, according to a military source, neither side had control of the village and the situation was unclear. Rebel jihadists reportedly took Armenian families hostage in Kasab and desecrated the town's three Armenian churches. The Army managed to recapture the town of Nab al-Murr. Meanwhile, Turkish media claimed the leader of the pro-government Syrian Resistance militia, Mihraç Ural, had been killed the previous day. However, that evening Mihraç Ural posted a video on his Facebook account denying rumors of his death. Al-Arabiya television also claimed that two other cousins of Bashar al-Assad were killed in the fighting.

According to Col. Afif Suleiman, head of the rebel Idlib Military Council, the Army withdrew many of its soldiers from Idlib province to reinforce their forces in Latakia province after the rebel offensive against the coastal area began.

On 25 March, rebels captured Al-Samra and were reportedly advancing towards Anfal. A military source denied the village had fallen stating that fighting was still ongoing and that the Army was in complete control of the mountains overlooking Al-Samra. Meanwhile, fighting was still raging at Kasab, with the Army shelling the town and the Air force striking it four times around noon. Later, a pro-government news agency claimed the Army managed to recapture most of Kasab. According to the editor-in-ehief of Aztag Daily, information warfare was being conducted and that it was too early to conclude whether government forces managed to regain control of the town, but confirmed fighting was ongoing. Rebels had also once again captured Observatory 45, after a Tunisian suicide bomber in an armored troop carrier blew himself up in the Observatory's yard killing a number of soldiers, including Colonel Samuel Ghannum, commander of Observatory 45. The fall of the Observatory removed the threat of artillery strikes against Jabal al-Nisr and the rebels were able to occupy its peak. Government troops from the hill retreated towards Qastal Maaf. Fighting around Observatory 45 continued. Meanwhile, the Army recaptured Al-Nab'in. Nineteen rebels and 16 soldiers were killed during the day's fighting and 40 soldiers and 100 rebels were wounded. The Turkish Army accused the Syrian government of "harassing" five Turkish F-16 fighter jets with surface-to-air missile systems. The Turkish F-16's intercepted four Syrian aircraft approaching Turkish airspace in Yayladagi and Cilvegozu of Hatay province in southern Turkey before the incident occurred.

On 26 March, rebels slowly pressed their advance from Observatory 45 and attacked the town of Qastal Maaf. Fighting had also renewed at Al-Nab'in. The battle for both towns had been described as a seesaw one with both attacks and retreats. At the same time, fighting continued around Kasab, Observatory 45 and Al-Samra as the Army intensified its shelling on Kasab and Al-Samra. The government mobilised thousands of soldiers and NDF fighters to retake the areas that had been lost to the rebels and many government supporters, the majority of them Alawites, volunteered to fight against the rebels. A military officer claimed rebels had been pushed back from Observatory 45, but were still in nearby areas. Another source also confirmed that the Army had beaten back the rebels from Observatory 45, but did not reoccupy it, instead securing the hill's surroundings. The military had also evacuated from Nab al-Murr, due to the town's vulnerability to rebel shelling from Observatory 45 and Jabal al-Nisr. Pro-government sources claimed 500 rebels and 50 soldiers had been killed since the start of the offensive, while the SOHR stated around 100 fighters on each side had died.

The Syrian government called on the United Nations to halt the Turkish involvement in the Kasab region. It accused the Turkish government for "organizing, receiving, funding and hosting tens of thousands of terrorists from various Takfiri movements and facilitating their entry into the Syrian territories" and for providing the rebels with direct military support in the region.

On 27 March, several helicopter and air strikes were conducted against Observatory 45, while Jabhat Al-Nusra reinforcements arrived in the contested areas. Two pro-government sources reported the military managed to defend their positions at Al-Nab'in and Qastal Maaf and was advancing towards Kasab from the two towns. A pro-opposition source reported that rebels managed to capture Al-Nab'in but that fighting was ongoing as the military was trying to recapture both it and Kasab. Another source reported that the military recaptured Al-Nab'in after it received reinforcements from troops who evacuated Jabal al-Nisr. Fighting was also still raging around Al-Samra. A pro-government newspaper also claimed another 200 rebel fighters had been killed in the last day. The military intelligence head in Latakia province was reportedly able to escape after he was surrounded by rebels for five days in Al-Nab'in. By the end of this day, according to the SOHR, more than 150 pro-government fighters, including 14 officers, had been killed since the start of the offensive.

On 28 March, it was reported that the rebels had blocked several attempts by the Syrian Army to send reinforcements to Latakia.

On 29 March, Al-Nab'in was once again reported under rebel control, but with fighting continuing in its outskirts. Al Aan TV claimed that 10 pro-government fighters were killed in an attempt by the Army to recapture Observatory 45. It also reported the arrival of Hezbollah fighters in the area. According to a local activist, the FSA had set up a joint operations room under command of Brigadier General and FSA Chief of staff Abdul-Ilah al-Bashir to support the rebel offensive.

On 30 March, the SOHR reported that several attempts by the Army to retake areas in northern Latakia had been repelled by the rebels. However, the military was bringing more reinforcements from the coastal city of Tartous to try to stem the rebel advance.

=== The battle for Observatory 45 ===
By 31 March, thousands of refugees reportedly fled to Latakia city, while a rising tension between the Armenian-Christian-Alawite community and the Turkmen community was reported. At this time, Barnabas Aid stated 80 Christian civilians were killed and thousands more displaced after rebel fighters captured Kasab; however, a delegation from the Armenian National Assembly visited and interviewed refugees from Kessab who fled to Latakia and concluded that "fortunately, no casualties were reported on the Armenian side," though around 2500 were displaced. According to the SOHR, 1,052 fighters from both sides had been killed and wounded since the start of the offensive. Among the dead were 27 Army officers and 56 foreign rebel fighters.

During the day, government forces made an attempt to advance towards Kasab as the rebel offensive started to stagnate and state TV made a live report from near the hilltop of Observatory 45 claiming the Army had recaptured it. The SOHR confirmed the Army made progress in the area and stated that government troops managed to install multiple rocket launcher on Observatory 45, but fighting was continuing in the vicinity of the hillside. Meanwhile, rebels hit the pro-government village of Bahloulieh with seven Grad missiles. Other pro-government villages were also shelled with mortars. The Turkish Army stated that they had returned fire after mortar shells and a rocket struck areas near the town of Yayladagi.

After midnight, government troops ambushed rebels in the forest around Observatory 45 resulting in a number of deaths among opposition fighters.

On 1 April, Ahmad Jarba, head of the Syrian National Coalition, visited the front-line in the Kasab region. The SOHR also denied State TV's claim that the Army had recaptured Observatory 45, stating that clashes were still ongoing over the hilltop.

On 2 April, according to the SOHR, the rebels reached the perimeter of al-Badrousiya village where violent clashes took place amid new Army reinforcements in that area. Opposition activists in Latakia claimed that the rebels repulsed an Army attack on Observatory 45. During the fighting for the hill, the Moroccan leader of the Harakat Sham al-Islam rebel group, Ibrahim bin Shakran, was killed. A local rebel commander was also killed in other clashes, while "dozens of bodies" of pro-government fighters were reportedly bussed to the city of Tartous, according to opposition activist's claims. An opposition TV station also claimed that 11 Hezbollah fighters were captured in an ambush by rebels in the province, but this report could not be verified.

On 3 April, according to the SOHR, rebels managed to regain control over the buildings of Observatory 45 after they were captured by pro-government fighters during the night. At least 11 rebels were killed in the fighting, while at least 20 pro-government fighters were killed and wounded. But later activists reported that government forces, supported by the NDF, had managed to reach the peak of Observatory 45 and clashes ensued with opposition fighters, including Jabhat al-Nusra. The SOHR also updated the past day's rebel death toll to 20.

On 4 April, the SOHR reported that 64 rebels, including 40 foreign fighters, and 35 government soldiers were killed in fighting for Observatory 45 over the previous two days. 50 soldiers were also wounded and among rebel fatalities, beside the leader of Harakat Sham al-Islam, was the group's Egyptian military commander, Abu Safiya Al-Masri. Fighting was continuing around Observatory 45 with mutual bombardment from both sides. Eight rebels and eight pro-government fighters were killed and 15 wounded in the fighting at Observatory 45. Meanwhile, the Turkish Army fired shells into Syria, responding to six shells that landed in Yayladadi.

=== Continued Army advance ===
On 5 April, after midnight, government troops ambushed rebels on the road towards Al-Nab'in resulting in a number of deaths among opposition fighters, while two Moroccan field commanders of Ahrar Al-Sham were killed in fighting in Kasab. It was reported that Latakia city was hit by two Grad missiles during the day.

On 7 April, fighting erupted on the edges of the Jabal al-Haramiya area with government forces advancing.

On 12 April, fighting erupted in Al-Nab'in and Nab Al-Murr and later in the day clashes were still ongoing in the towns perimeters. The next day, the Army recaptured Chalma mountain (also known as Sal-Darin mountain), near Kassab, while heavy clashes were still taking place near Observatory 45.

By 15 April, the FSA commander for Latakia province stated the offensive had stagnated after rebel forces had become exhausted due to the number of casualties they had endured and a shortage of ammunition. Three days later, another opposition commander criticised the opposition Syrian National Coalition for not providing enough financial support for the offensive and supporting countries for not providing enough arms.

=== Capture of Al-Samra and the battle for the hills ===
On 27 April, government forces captured a guard post near Al-Samra, namely the town's police station, after an amphibious assault from the sea. As evening came, rebels had retreated from Al-Samra and government forces captured the village.

The next day, the military secured Chalma mountain and engaged rebels on top of Tal Al-Ahmar, while other government troops, including Special Forces from Al-Samra, advanced towards Al-Nab'in. Four soldiers were killed and 75 wounded by mid-day, while an unknown number of rebels also died. Government forces from Observatory 45 had also advanced, capturing Height 724 north of the Observatory. The Army further captured Heights 959 and 1017. Two days later, government forces were fighting rebels on Jabal al-Nisr mountain, near Al-Nab'in, and on three hills overlooking Kasab in an attempt to capture the hilly terrain before engaging opposition forces in the towns themselves. Later in the day, government troops fully secured Al-Samra and its surrounding hills. On 3 May, government troops captured radar hill 1013 overlooking and the next day fighting erupted in Al-Nab'in.

In mid-May, rebels reportedly recaptured Hills 53, 724 and 1013, as well as Seriatel and Al-Nab'in hills. Opposition forces also attempted to capture Observatory 45, but failed.

As of 18 May, the offensive was considered to have petered out.

=== Syrian army offensive – Rebel retreat ===
On 12 June, the military started a new offensive and by the next day captured Hills 714, 767 and 803.

On 14 June, most rebels retreated from Kasab, while a few of them stayed to protect the retreating fighters. This came after the Army took hold of areas that surround Al-Nab'in and advanced towards Kasab. The SOHR reported the military was moving towards nearby villages, including Al-Nab'in, while state TV already reported the capture of the town. SANA also stated two-thirds of Kasab were under military control.

On 15 June, the Syrian Army took control of Kasab, its border crossing, Al-Nab'in and Nab Al-Murr, fully reversing all opposition gains during the three-month campaign. Meanwhile, the Army intensified its operations in the east of the province near Salma.

== Controversies ==
=== Allegations of Turkish involvement ===
It was reported that the attackers, members of the al-Nusra Front, Sham al-Islam, and Ansar al-Sham, advanced directly from the village of Gözlekçiler on Turkish territory, were being supported by the Turkish military, and that injured rebel fighters were being sent to medical centres in Turkey. Some Kessab village guards reported that the Turkish military withdrew from its positions along the border shortly before the fighters crossed from Turkey.

Mehmet Ali Ediboğlu, MP of Turkish CHP party, who visited the area several days after the attack began, said locals told him that "thousands of fighters coming from Turkey crossed the border at at least five different points to launch the attack on Kassab." While journalists were barred from visiting Gözlekçiler, Ediboğlu said he personally observed "dozens of Syrian-plated cars nonstop transporting terrorists and firing into the Syrian outpost from the military road between Gözlekçiler village and our military base at Kayapinar."

According to security sources in Kessab, the attacks were waged under heavy artillery cover by the Turkish army, while the injured were being carried back and treated in the city of Yayladagi in Turkey, which borders Syria.

A jihadist told the Telegraph on 21 March "Turkey did us a big favour... They allowed our guys to enter from their border post," allowing them to finally access Kessab. Turkey denied the allegations as "totally unfounded and untrue", the Telegraph reported, but HRW's Fakih replied "it is not feasible that these groups could have crossed into Syria from where they did without the knowledge of the Turks."

=== Turkish shootdown of Syrian fighter jet ===
After Turkish Air Force F-16 jet fighters had shot down a Syrian warplane near the border post, the pilot, who ejected safely, claimed that the plane was in Syrian airspace. Turkish officials, however, claimed it violated their airspace.

Turkey's opposition leader, Kemal Kilicdaroglu (CHP) claimed that the Syrian jet was a reconnaissance plane and that its downing was part of a government scheme to provoke war with Syria to divert attention from corruption scandals enveloping Turkey's president Erdogan and his party. Istanbul-based journalist Amberin Zaman commented that the recently leaked audio tapes in which Turkish Foreign Minister Ahmet Davutoğlu is heard discussing ways to spark a war with Syria might vindicate Kilicdaroglu's claims.

=== Armenian civilian fatalities ===
The offense has been widely compared to the Hamidian massacres and Armenian genocide, as over 70% of Kessab's population is Armenian and is one of the last Armenian settlements in the Cilicia region, where the Armenian population had been massacred twice by Turkey. President of Armenia Serzh Sargsyan stated, "All of us perfectly remember the history of Kessab, which was unfortunately full of hellish realities of deportations in the last 100 years", referring to both events. On 2 April, during a hearing before the House State-Foreign Operations Appropriations Subcommittee and in response to a question by Congressman Schiff, US ambassador to the UN Samantha Power, said that Kessab "is an issue of huge concern". Congressman Schiff noted that many of the residents were descendants of victims of the Armenian genocide and that "there is a particular poignancy to their being targeted in this manner". On 3 April Armenia's Minister of Diaspora Hranush Hakobyan said that 38 of Kessab's Armenian inhabitants had been captured when the town fell to the rebels, 24 of them were later released, 3 had been forcefully taken into Turkey and were now in the village of Vaqif, and that 670 Armenian families had been displaced after the attack on Kessab, with about 400 of the families, at least 2,000 ethnic Armenian civilians, sought refuge in Latakia and other neighboring hills. The minister also said that in Kessab, Armenian churches had been defaced, crosses on the churches had been removed, Armenian shops and homes had been looted. Also on 3 April, Ruben Melkonyan, deputy dean of the Oriental Studies department at Yerevan State University, said that the Armenian community of Kessab was unlikely to recover and that what had happened were "crimes that make a genocide".

A number of eyewitness accounts of looting and occupation of Armenian homes, stores, and churches left behind were reported in Kessab. Armed men entered the town, looted Armenian shops and homes, taking families hostage, and desecrating the town's three churches. Kessab Armenians who phoned their neighbors and relatives homes from Latakia discovered that their houses are already occupied by rebel fighters, who went on to taunt and threaten the refugees. Some of the rebels had spoken in Turkish. Some 670 Armenian families, the majority of the population of Kessab, were evacuated by the local Armenian community leadership to safer areas in neighboring Basit and Latakia. Ten to fifteen families with relations too elderly to move were either unable to leave or chose to stay in their homes. According to witnesses, the rebels had raped elderly women because they couldn't find any girls.

== Aftermath ==
After the Syrian Army retook Kessab and the surrounding villages, news agencies and local residents of Kessab reported that the town's Armenian Catholic and Evangelical churches had been ruined and burnt by the Islamist groups, along with the Misakyan Cultural Centre. Around 250 families from Kessab who had taken refuge in Latakia returned to their homes a day after the Syrian Army recaptured the town. On 25 July the St. Astvatsatsin Church in Garaturan was reconsecrated, with the first liturgy since the ending of the Islamist occupation taking place on 27 July, the day of Vardavar, and attended by a large number of people

== Foreign reaction ==
- Armenia – President Serzh Sargsyan made a press statement at the World Forum Convention Center in The Hague (Netherlands) expressing his deep concern over the events in Kessab, remembering that the Armenian population of Kessab had experienced exile and deportation in April 1909 and in 1915 (during the Armenian genocide), making a parallel with the 2014 situation: "The third deportation of Kessab Armenians today is a serious challenge to ethnic minority rights protection mechanisms of the 21st century." He also thanked the Syrian authorities for the steps being taken to protect the Armenians in Kessab.
- Canada – Andrew P. W. Bennett, Canadian Ambassador to the Office of Religious Freedom stated: "Canada is deeply concerned by the recent attacks by al Qaeda affiliated armed groups on the ancient Armenian town of Kessab in the Latakia district of northern Syria during which Armenian churches were reportedly desecrated and Armenians driven from their homes...We stand determined that the perpetrators be brought to justice for such acts and to stem the rising tide of sectarian violence.".
- Nagorno-Karabakh – David Babayan, Spokesman for the President of the Nagorno-Karabakh Republic, said that Turkey continues its anti-Armenian policy, in particular in Kessab: "Through subversive attacks, Turkey tries to make Armenians leave Syria and aims to liquidate the Armenian community of Syria." He also stated that while it would be preferable for Syrian Armenians to remain in Syria and preserve their communities there, Nagorno-Karabakh would be ready to accept and welcome any refugees.
- Russia – Gennady Gatilov, Deputy Foreign Minister of Russia, condemned the attack on Kesab and the ethnic cleansing of Armenian Syrians in Latakia. He accused Turkey, the western countries and the Persian gulf states of supporting terrorism in Syria and called for an urgent meeting of the United Nations Security Council to discuss the situation. The UN Security Council declined Russia's meeting proposal.
  - Chechnya – Ramzan Kadyrov, Head of the Chechen Republic, condemned the attack on Kesab and accused Turkey of assisting terrorists and expressed his condolences to the ethnic Armenian victims.
- United States – State Department Deputy Spokesperson Marie Harf stated during a press briefing on 28 March: "We are deeply troubled by recent fighting and violence that is endangering the Armenian community in Kessab, Syria and has forced many to flee. As we have said throughout this conflict, we deplore continued threats against Christians and other minorities in Syria". She ended adding: "The United States will continue its steadfast support to those affected by violence in Syria and throughout the region, including Syrian Armenians. We have long had concerns about the threat posed by violent extremists, and this latest threat to the Armenian community in Syria only underscores this further". The Congressional Armenia Caucus noted their concern in a letter to the President.
  - The Armenian National Committee of America (ANCA), has condemned the "onslaught on Kessab" and accused Turkey of facilitating the infiltration of radical groups in their attacks on Christian and other minority populations in Kessab. The group has also called on the US administration and Congress to pressure Ankara to end its support for "the destruction of Kessab." In a statement, the group said, "For months, we have warned the international community of the imminent threat posed by extremist foreign fighters against the Christian minority population in Syria. These vicious and unprompted attacks against the Armenian-populated towns and villages of Kessab are the latest examples of this violence, actively encouraged by neighboring Turkey. We call upon all states with any influence in the Syrian conflict to use all available means to stop these attacks against the peaceful civilian population of Kessab, to allow them to return to their homes in safety and security."

== See also ==
- 2013 Latakia offensive
