= Tahrir al-Sham–Jundullah conflict =

Military conflict

- Part of the inter-rebel conflict in the Syrian Civil War
Date	25–28 October 2021 (3 days)
Location	Northwestern Syria: Northeastern Latakia Governorate; Western Idlib Governorate
Result	Hay'at Tahrir al-Sham victory
Territorial changes	Jundallah and allies agree to leave the Turkmen Mountains

Belligerents
Syrian Salvation Government; Hayat Tahrir al-Sham	Jundallah; Jund al-Islam; Unaffiliated jihadists

Commanders and leaders
Abu Mohammad al-Julani	Abu Musa al Shishani (Jundullah leader); Mahr al-Dein

Casualties and losses
9 killed	26 killed 3 captured Several foreign jihadists executed

The Tahrir al-Sham–Jundullah conflict was a series of violent clashes between Hayat Tahrir al-Sham and several rival jihadist factions operating in the Idlib and Latakia governorates in Syria. The clashes began on 25 October 2021 after HTS demanded that the jihadist leader Muslim Shishani should stand trial after they accused him and his group of sheltering members of the Islamic State.

== Prelude ==
HTS sent a mediation committee to meet with Shishani on 21 October. The committee included members of Turkistan Islamic Party in Syria, Jaish al-Muhajireen wal-Ansar, Ajnad al-Kavkaz and Muhammed Shakiel. After negotiations, Junud al-Sham agreed to leave the area.

HTS announced on 24 October that Junud al-Sham was not a target of the operation.

== Clashes ==
On 25 October, clashes began in and around Jisr al-Shugur and the Turkmen Mountains after forces of HTS attacked the headquarters of the Junud al-Sham faction, following a refusal to stand some of their members on trial as part of an internal security operation by HTS. The clashes soon also involved Jundallah (a group of mostly Turkish and Azeri jihadists), Jund al-Islam, and unaffiliated foreign jihadists. Tensions increased when Jundallah arrested several HTS fighters in the Turkmen Mountains. In response, HTS brought up to 100 vehicles with heavy weapons towards the north of Latakia. The same day, HTS stormed the headquarters of Jundallah in Jisr al-Shugur.

On 26 October, after hours of fighting, forces of HTS had taken Abu Aref hill in the Turkmen mountains from Jundallah, killing seven members of the faction. Four members of HTS were also killed during the fighting. Under mediation of the Turkistan Islamic Party in Syria, HTS had secured a deal with two rival factions where they agreed to leave the Turkmen Mountains, however some members of the factions refused and continued fighting. Later, HTS forces captured three Chechen jihadists that had refused to abide by the deal. The deal also secured the transfer of prisoners.

On 27 October, heavy clashes were reported between Jundallah and HTS on the frontlines of the Turkmen Mountains.

On 28 October, HTS arrested two men after storming the village of Deir Hassan, for their part in a demonstration against the fighting in Latakia. The fighting ended after HTS managed to capture two Jundallah field commanders together with the leader of Jundullah, Abu Musa al Shishani. al-Shishani is reportedly the brother of Muslim Shishani.

== Aftermath ==
Following the deal between HTS and Junud al-Sham & Jundallah, it was reported on 29 October that HTS had executed several foreign members of jihadist groups on the frontlines in the Turkmen Mountains.

== See also ==
- Idlib Governorate clashes (June 2020)
- National Front for Liberation–Tahrir al-Sham conflict
