= Abdul Karim Krymsky =

- Nickname(s): Abdul Karim al-Ukraini
- Born: 1974; Uzbek Soviet Socialist Republic
- Died: December 2024
- Allegiance: Jaish al-Muhajireen wal-Ansar Caucasus Emirate in Syria
- Battles / wars: Syrian Civil War; Northwestern Syria campaign (October 2017–February 2018)

Kerim Bilyalov (1974 – December 2024), commonly known by his nom de guerre Abdul Karim Krymsky, was a Crimean Tatar who served as the deputy emir of Jaish al-Muhajireen wal-Ansar and was the head of a Crimean jamaat.

== Life ==
Krymsky was born Kerim Bilyalov and took up the nom de guerre Abdul Karim Krymsky.

He was first seen in Syria in May 2013.

He served as a deputy to Salahuddin Shishani in Jaish al-Muhajireen wal-Ansar (JMWA), until they were reportedly replaced in June 2015 with the assistance of Al-Nusra Front. A sharia court had ruled against them, leading to their departure.

He and other former members of JMWA formed the Caucasus Emirate in Syria.

== Death ==
Krymsky was killed in Aleppo Governorate in December 2024.
