= Siege of Menagh Air Base =

Military operation

- Part of the Battle of Aleppo of Syrian civil war
- Map showing the siege
Date	2 August 2012 – 6 August 2013 (1 year and 4 days)
Location	Menagh Air Base, Aleppo, Syria 36°31′19″N 037°2′28″E
Result	Rebel victory
Territorial changes	Rebels capture the Menagh Air Base

Belligerents
Free Syrian Army; Al-Nusra Front; Islamic State	Ba'athist Syria

Commanders and leaders
Col. Abdul Jabbar al-Oqaidi (Aleppo military council); Amar al-Dadikhi (WIA) (Northern Storm Brigade); Capt. Ahmed Ghazali (Northern Storm Brigade); Abu Marwan (Northern Storm Brigade); Abu Omar al-Shishani (JAMWA and ISIL top commander); Abu Jandal al-Masri (JAMWA and ISIL commander); Abu Usamah al-Maghrebi	(Ba'athist Syria) Brig. Gen. Ali Salim Mahmoud † (Ba'athist Syria) Col. Naji Abu Shaar †

Units involved
Free Syrian Army; Revolutionary Military Council in Aleppo; Al-Tawhid Brigade; Free North Brigade; Qabda al-Shamal Battalion; Conquest Brigade; Northern Storm Brigade; Northern Commandos Brigade; Al-Sham Swords Brigade; Shahba Hawks Brigade; Al-Buraq Battalions; Saladin Ayubi Brigade; Kurdish Front Brigade (until May 2013); (Islamic State) Military of ISIL; Jaish al-Muhajireen wal-Ansar (JAMWA)	Syrian Arab Armed Forces; Syrian Army; 17th Reserve Division; 12th Armored Brigade; Syrian Air Force; 4th Flying Training Squadron

Strength
Several hundred Chechen fighters	300 (as of January 2013); 200+ (as of May 2013) 70–120 (as of August 2013); 47 Mil Mi-8 helicopters (as of August 2012)

Casualties and losses
300 killed	94–100 killed 5+ Mil Mi-8s destroyed or captured
- Location within Syria

The siege of Menagh Air Base (also spelled Menegh, Mannagh, or Minakh) was an armed confrontation between the Syrian Arab Armed Forces and the Free Syrian Army and aligned Islamist opposition groups during the Syrian civil war.

== Siege ==
=== 2012 ===
The first major rebel assault against the base came in the weeks following the start of the battle of Aleppo. Rebel fighters from the Free Syrian Army and affiliated groups launched an attack against the air base on 2 August 2012 using a combination of small arms, rocket-propelled grenades, and five tanks they had captured during the battle of Anadan. The base was used by Syrian Air Force helicopters and jet aircraft to bombard rebel positions, and seizing it was seen as vital to the rebels in their advances across northern Syria. The initial rebel attack was repelled by government troops entrenched inside the air base's perimeter, though rebel commanders said they would continue the siege and capture the base.

Heavy fighting broke out on the night of 27 December and continued "all night", as rebels had once again assaulted the besieged base. MiG warplanes bombed rebel positions on the outskirt of the base in an effort to alleviate some of the pressure on the defenders.

=== 2013 ===
By January 2013, the base still held out against the rebels, despite being besieged on all sides. The remaining defenders were receiving supplies of weapons and food, as well as medical evacuations by helicopter; however, these flights became increasingly risky for pilots as rebel forces gained access to heavy weaponry and fired upon government helicopters. At this point the rebels estimated roughly 300 soldiers remained defending the air base. Soldiers who defected from the base reported that food supplies were a major issue and that soldiers were given rations of dry rice and wheat and told to "make what they can from it". Self-inflicted injuries were also reported as soldiers attempted to escape the fighting.

On 8 February, the Syrian Air Force bombed parts of the base after rebel fighters stormed it, which forced the rebels to retreat.

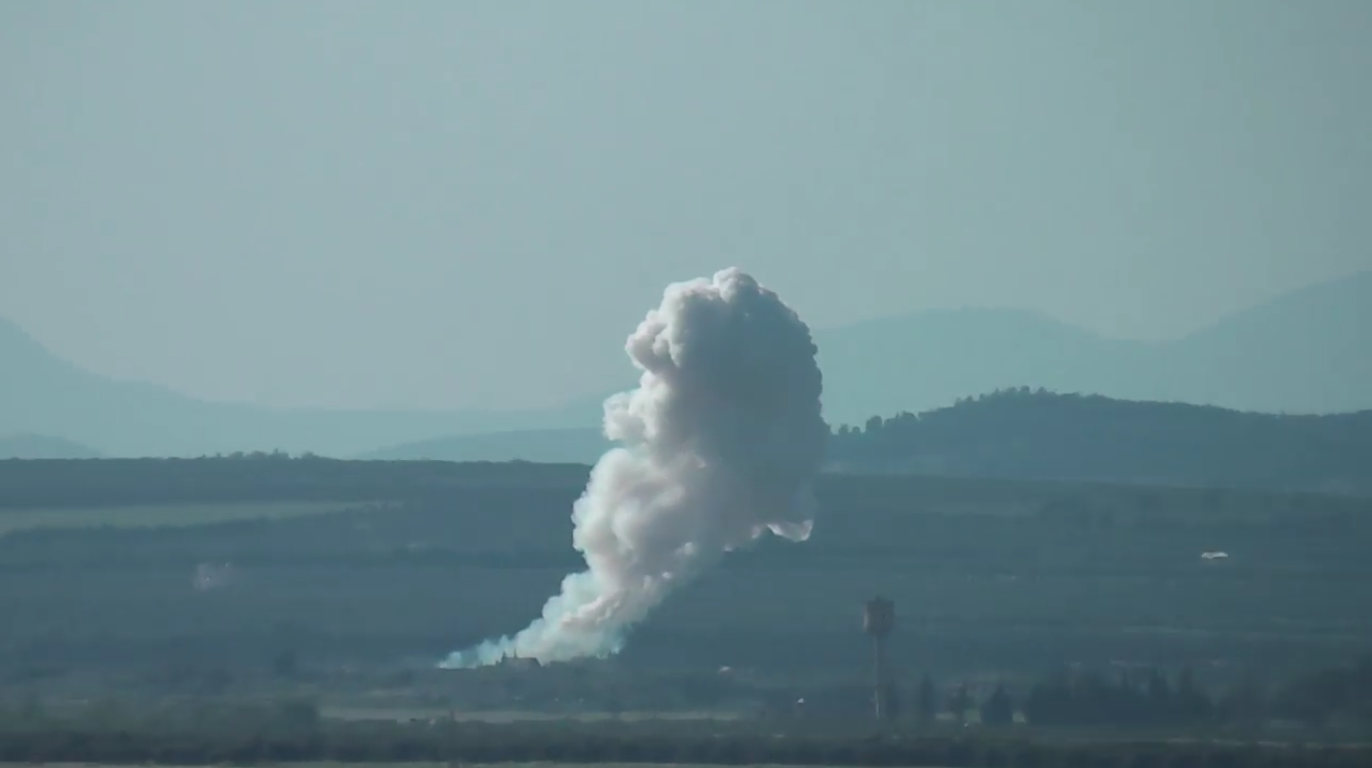
Syrian Air Force strike on the surroundings of Menagh Air Base in support of the besieged government forces inside the base, April 2013

A rebel attack was once again repulsed by government troops on 28 April, though rebels did manage to overrun some parts of the base before being forced to withdraw.

On 5 May, as the siege of the base continued and government soldiers still refused to surrender, rebels launched their biggest offensive against the base to date, overrunning several Army positions and moving deep inside the base and capturing a tank, although they came under heavy aerial attack by the Air Force. Rebels claimed that a group of pilots defected and assassinated the base's commanding officer. The defecting pilots told rebels that around 200 soldiers remained in the base, garrisoned in the headquarters building supported by a handful of tanks. Many soldiers resorted to sleeping under tanks, fearing a rebel assault. On 9 May, it was reported that, although they managed to capture parts of the Menagh Air Base, rebel fighters were forced to retreat from the base due to heavy air strikes.

On 28 May, rebel sources reported that the government conducted a successful airborne resupply mission to the Menagh base after several thousand FSA and jihadist rebels moved west to launch an attack on Kurdish fighters of the People's Protection Units (YPG) in the Afrin region, bringing critical military and logistical supplies to the air base. The Kurdish Front Brigade also withdrew its participation in the siege in order to join forces with the YPG to repel the attack on Afrin.

On 7 June, rebel forces attacked the air base and fired tank shells at its command building, but were once again repelled. Rebel forces launched another assault on 10 June, and by the next day had managed to secure the control tower after heavy fighting. Government forces responded by shelling rebel held parts of the base. On 17 June, rebels clashed with pro-government fighters from Nubl and Al-Zahraa who were headed for Menagh in an effort to reinforce the remaining soldiers inside the base.

On 23 June, the Syrian Observatory for Human Rights (SOHR), a pro-opposition war observer, reported that rebels had detonated a large car bomb in the government-held area of Menagh, which killed 12 soldiers and destroyed many buildings within the airport. The explosion was reportedly followed by missile fire on Army positions.

==== Final assault ====
An ISIL suicide bomber detonates a car bomb during the final assault on Menagh Air Base.

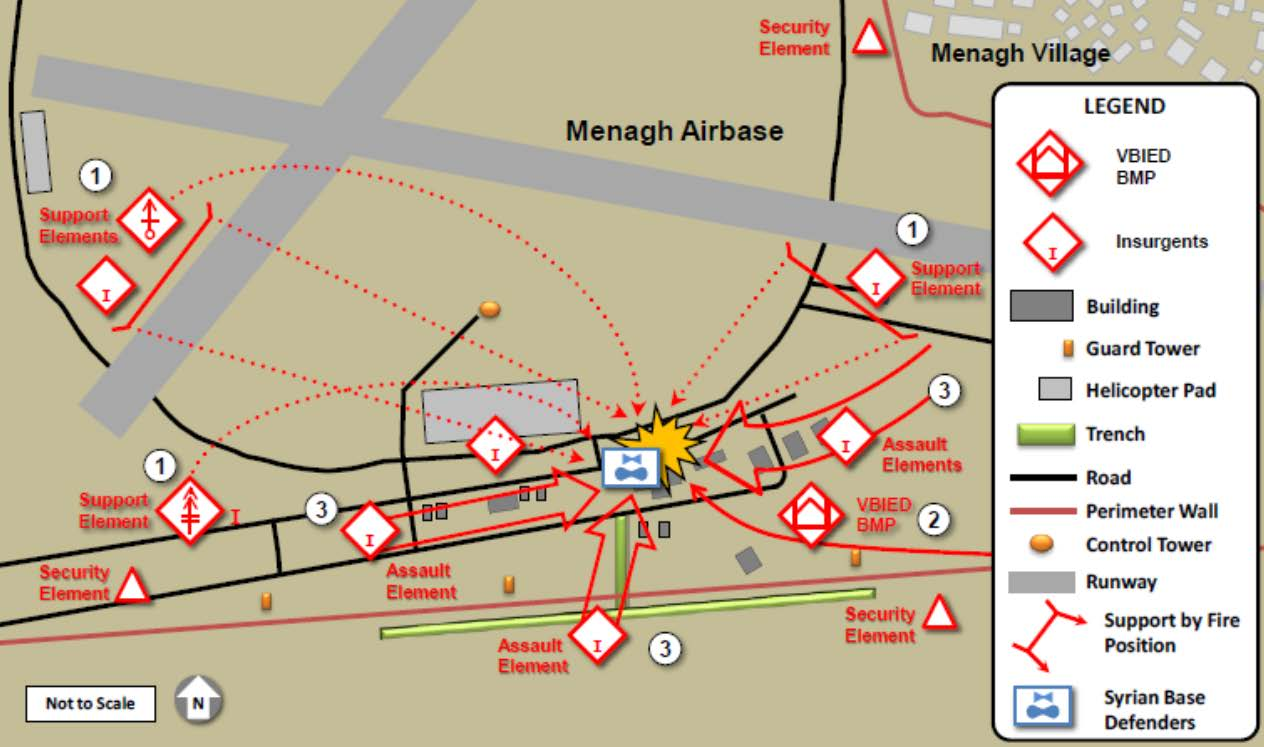
Map of the final assault on the air base in August 2013

After ten months of siege warfare, the various rebel groups at Menagh Air Base finally decided to coordinate in order to launch a large-scale assault to capture the base. Several insurgent militias taking part in this coordinated effort were actually hostile toward each other (for example, the Northern Storm Brigade had clashed with the Islamic State of Iraq and the Levant (ISIL) as late as July 2013); nevertheless, they put their differences mostly aside for the final attack on the base. The rebels prepared their assault with a three-day long bombardment using artillery, mortars, and machine-guns. The attack was carried out on 5 August 2013, led by jihadist Abu Omar al-Shishani, a chief ISIL commander. By this point, 70–120 government troops had remained, holding out in a small section of the complex.

The attack began when two foreign suicide bombers from ISIL's JAMWA, one of them a Saudi, drove a BMP infantry fighting vehicle up to the airport's command center and blew themselves up, destroying the building and killing or scattering the defenders. Despite this, the surviving soldiers continued to offer heavy resistance as ISIL, along with FSA and Islamist forces, stormed the base from three sides. By the morning of the next day, however, rebel forces had full control of the airport. In course of the final battle, 32 government soldiers and at least 19 rebels were killed. According to the insurgents, on the morning of the final attack, ten soldiers defected to the rebels and claimed to have attempted but failed to kill the base commander, who was later captured as he attempted to retreat with his men. Though most of the aircraft which had originally been stationed at the airbase was distributed to other bases during the siege, the Syrian Air Force lost at least five Mil Mi-8 helicopters at Menagh.

About 70 Syrian soldiers, who managed to flee from the base during the battle, surrendered themselves (and two tanks) the next day to the Kurdish-led YPG in Afrin, located about 15 kilometers west of the airbase. It was later reported that the surrendered troops were from the 17th Division and some officers from those surrendered troops were turned over by the YPG to the al-Nusra Front in exchange for Arab and Kurdish YPG prisoners al-Nusra captured from previous battles. Al-Nusra then executed the officers they had received. The YPG later apologized for the incident.

== Aftermath ==
The fall of Menagh Air Base fortified rebel control over much of north-western Syria. The role of JAMWA in the siege, however, strengthened outside perception of the Syrian insurgency as one relying heavily on foreign jihadists. Islamist extremists generally portrayed the victory as being one for their cause. Regional expert Joanna Paraszczuk argued that the importance of JAMWA in the siege should not be overstated, however, as the victory was achieved through the coordination of numerous rebel groups and not just the activities of JAMWA.

Two and a half years after the siege's end, in February 2016, the Kurdish-led Syrian Democratic Forces, supported by Russian airstrikes, captured Menagh Air Base from the rebels.
