= Ahl al-Sham =

Ahl Al-Sham
- غرفة أهل الشام
- The official logo of Ahl Al-Sham
- Dates active: 24 February 2014 – 6 February 2015
- Groups: Islamic Front; al-Nusra Front; Army of Mujahedeen; Jaish al-Muhajireen wal-Ansar
- Headquarters: Aleppo, Syria
- Active regions: Aleppo Governorate, Syria
- Wars: the Syrian Civil War

Ahl Al-Sham (Arabic: غرفة أهل الشام) was a joint command structure and umbrella organization of four main Syrian opposition factions operating in Aleppo, Syria. The factions are:

- Syria's largest rebel group, the Islamic Front
- the al-Qaeda-affiliated al-Nusra Front
- the foreign Russian-speaking jihadist group Jaish al-Muhajireen wal-Ansar
- and the anti-ISIL coalition, the Army of Mujahedeen.

The group has held talks with the People's Protection Units and Jabhat al-Akrad; they have agreed to a truce in order to focus on fighting the Assad government.

The groups involved in the structure are perceived differently by the United States; while Al-Nusra Front and Jaish al-Muhajireen wal-Ansar are designated as terrorist organizations by the United States. In contrast Islamic Front is considered by the United States as a "moderate" fighting force and the Army of Mujahedeen is being vetted by them to receive support.

In late October 2014, the al-Nusra Front began attacking cities held by the Free Syrian Army and other moderate Islamist groups, in an attempt to establish its own Islamic state with imposed Sharia rule.

In December 2014, the Levant Front coalition was established, possibly superseding Ahl al-Sham. It includes the Islamic Front and the Army of Mujahideen but excludes al-Nusra and Jaish al-Muhajireen wal-Ansar. The Aleppo Liberation operations room was established in February 2015; it includes Jaish al-Muhajireen wal-Ansar as part of the Jabhat Ansar al-Din.

== Historic uses of this term ==
The name ahl al sham is also used in the context of an anti-umayyad opposition of early medieval arabic tribes in the year 750. This coalition later formed the fundament of power for the abbasid caliphate.

== See also ==
- List of armed groups in the Syrian Civil War
- Army of Conquest
