= Group of the One and Only =

Rebel group that fought in the Syrian Civil War

- جماعة أحد أحد; Jamaat Ahadun Ahad
- Flag of the Group of the One and Only
- Leader: Al Bara Shishani
- Dates active: July 2014 - ?
- Active regions: Latakia Governorate, Syria; Idlib Governorate, Syria
- Ideology: Sunni Islamism; Salafism
- Size: 250–300
- Wars: Syrian Civil War

The Group of the One and Only (Arabic: جماعة أحد أحد Jamaat Ahadun Ahad) was a minor rebel group that fought in the Syrian Civil War.

== History ==
The group's leader, Amir Al Bara, and an unknown number of fighters, reportedly left Latakia and later joined the Islamic State of Iraq and the Levant in 2016.

== Composition ==
The group was composed of foreigners and Syrians. Specifically, the group is made up of "Chechens, Turks, Arabs, Europeans, and... former members of the Taliban."

The organization included four Chechen subgroups and two subgroups of native Syrians.

== See also ==
- List of armed groups in the Syrian Civil War
