= Abu Jandal al-Masri =

ISIL senior official

- أبو جندل المصري

Chief of Information of the Islamic State
- Incumbent
- Assumed office 23 January 2017
- Preceded by: Abu Ahmed al-Souri

Personal details
- Born: Egypt
- Citizenship: Egypt
- Occupation: Islamic State senior official
- Nickname: Abu Jandal al-Masri

Military service
- Allegiance: Islamic State
- Rank: Commander
- Battles/wars: Syrian civil war: Siege of Menagh Air Base

Abu Jandal al-Masri (Arabic: أبو جندل المصري) is an Egyptian who served as a senior official in the Islamic State. It was reported on January 23, 2017, that he was appointed to replace Abu Ahmed al-Souri as the group's Chief of Information.

According to the American Enterprise Institute he was a competent military commander, prior to serving as Chief of Information.

The Middle East Forum described him as an ISIL commander in the capture of the Minnagh Airbase. They quoted a speech he gave, where he allegedly swore that Mujahideen fighters would "not leave a single Alawite alive in Syria."
