= Salahuddin Shishani =

Chechen fighter (d. 2017)

- Born: Duisi, Pankisi Gorge, Georgian SSR, Soviet Union (now Georgia)
- Died: December 2017
- Military career
- Allegiance: Caucasus Emirate Jaish al-Muhajireen wal-Ansar Jaysh Usrah
- Nicknames: Giorgi Kushtanashvili; Feyzullah Margoshvili
- Conflicts: First Chechen War; 2001 Kodori crisis Second Chechen War Syrian Civil War: Northwestern Syria campaign (October 2017-February 2018)

Giorgi Kushtanashvili (? – December 2017), later known as Feyzullah Margoshvili, and commonly known by his nom de guerre Salahuddin Shishani, was one of the Chechen mujahideen in Syria. He was briefly the head of Jaish al-Muhajireen wal-Ansar and later headed Jaysh Usrah in Syria until his death in December 2017.

== Early life ==
Shishani was born Giorgi Kushtanashvili, though he changed his name to Feyzullah Margoshvili and later took up the nom de guerre Salahuddin Shishani.

== Militant activities ==
He "fought alongside" Ruslan Gelayev during the wars in Chechnya and participated in the 2001 Kodori crisis.

Shishani was involved in a July 2002 battle with Russian forces in Itum-Kalinsky District, Russia after a group of militants had crossed the Russian-Georgian border, in which eight "Russian soldiers were killed" and seven "wounded." He was arrested in August 2002 alongside another Georgian, Robinzon Margoshvili, as well as a few Chechens. Shishani and Margoshvili were charged with "crossing the border illegally and trafficking explosives and weapons", to which they pled not guilty. The Russians were previously handed over to the Russian government, while the two Georgians were released in April 2003.

Shishani was sent to Syria on behalf of the Caucasus Emirate and served as a deputy to Abu Omar al-Shishani in Jaish al-Muhajireen wal-Ansar (JMWA) and was made the emir following al-Shishani's defection to the Islamic State (IS) in November 2013. Shishani traveled to Raqqa and unsuccessfully sought a truce between the Islamic State and other rebel groups in his role as head of JMWA. IS attempted to assassinate him and killed his driver. He and his deputy, Abdul Karim Krymsky, served until June 2015, and were reportedly replaced with the assistance of Al-Nusra Front. A sharia court had ruled against him and Krimsky, leading to their departure from the group.

Following his ousting, he pledged bay'ah to the Caucasus Emirate. He and other former members of JMWA formed the Caucasus Emirate in Syria. He was removed as the head of the Caucasus Emirate in December 2015.

He established Jaysh Usrah, which was primarily made up of Syrians, and had numbered around 300, though following his death, the group is likely defunct.

== Death ==
Shishani was killed in Hama Governorate in December 2017, reportedly by a Russian airstrike.
