= Seda Dudurkaeva =

Wife of Abu Omar al-Shishani

- Born: 24 April 1993 (age 33); Grozny, Chechnya
- Other name: Aisha
- Citizenship: Russia
- Movement: Islamic State
- Spouse(s): Hamzat Borchashvili (m. 2013; died 2014), Abu Omar al-Shishani (m. 2014; died 2016)
- Children: Two boys
- Parent(s): Milana Dudurkaeva, Asu Dudurkayev
- Criminal charge: Links to ISIS
- Wanted by: Interpol; Ministry of Internal Affairs (Russia)

Details
- Date apprehended: 20 July 2018
- Imprisoned at: Turkey

Seda Dudurkaeva (born 24 April 1993) is a Chechen woman and a Russian citizen. Famous in her native Chechnya for her beauty, Dudurkaeva travelled to Syria and married in succession two Islamic State militants both of whom were killed in the war. She was later arrested in Turkey over her connections to IS. Her story, and that of other IS members from the former Soviet Bloc, is discussed in journalist Katerina Sergatskova's book Goodbye, ISIS: What Remains is Future.

Around August 2013, Dudurkaeva married Hamzat Borchashvili, a rank and file IS fighter, who in Syria went by the name Abu Abdullah. He was born in Georgia and his mother sent him and his younger brother to Austria to live with their father when the boys were in their teens, in order to get them away from radical Islamist influences. He got an engineering degree from a university in Vienna and learned to speak five languages, and after ten years he returned to Georgia. In 2013 he left to join the Islamic State in Syria.

The marriage caused a scandal in Chechnya, where Dudurkaeva's father, Asu Dudurkaev, was a wealthy senior government official. Ramzan Kadyrov, head of the Chechen government, had declared a fight against Wahhabist influence there, and fired Dudurkaev from his ministerial post, saying he had "has no moral right to speak with subordinates about morality and patriotism and religion" because he could not control his daughter. Kadyrov demanded that Dudurkaeva return to Chechnya, calling it a "matter of honor." He sent her brother to Syria to try to persuade her to come home, but she refused. Her parents went to Syria also to take her home, but Dudurkaeva told them she had taken the path of Allah and her husband pointed out she had sworn allegiance to Abu Bakr al-Baghdadi. Borchashvili's mother also went to Syria to try to persuade her son and his wife to return, but Dudurkaeva refused to return home and Borchashvili was not willing to let her go, so she remained with them for a time.

The couple lived in Aleppo. Borchashvili's mother said they were very poor but seemed happy together, and Seda told her she felt a spiritual freedom in Syria. Seda adopted the nom de guerre Aisha. Borchashvili was killed in 2014. His brother went to fight for IS after his death and was killed several months later.

Dudurkaeva wanted to return to her family after Borchashvili's death. Instead she married a prominent Georgian-Chechen Islamic State commander, Abu Omar al-Shishani, whose real name was Tarkhan Tayumurazovich Batirashvili. He had been a close childhood friend of her first husband, who worked as his interpreter under IS. According to one report there were rumours, but no evidence, that al-Shishani had arranged the death of Borchashvili in order to wed Dudurkaeva. Borchashvili's mother tried to return to Syria again to see her sons' graves, but al-Shishani told her she had "no business left" in Syria.

In July 2016, al-Shishani was killed. Dudurkaeva later told her mother she tried to escape from ISIL with her oldest baby while she was pregnant with her son, but was caught. She only escaped execution due to her pregnancy. In 2017, she was able to escape from Raqqa, IS's Syrian capital, to Idlib. On July 4, 2018, Dudurkaeva was detained in Istanbul with her two young sons by al-Shishani, who were one and three years old at the time, on charges of illegal border crossing and having ties to IS.

== See also ==
- Khadijah Dare
- Tooba Gondal
- Sally-Anne Jones
- Aqsa Mahmood

== Other sources ==
- "IŞİD'in Kobani komutanı, Çeçen gelin için arkadaşını öldürmüş!". CNN Türk (in Turkish). 30 October 2014. Google translation:

- "مذكرة استفسار روسية إلى سلطات النظام التركي" (in Arabic). 2018.

- "თურქეთში თარხან ბათირაშვილის მეუღლე დააკავეს" (in Georgian). 2018.

- "DEAŞ lideri evlilik teklifini reddeden yengesini intihar bombacısı yaptı". CNN Türk (in Turkish). 11 December 2018.

- "Widow of Omar al-Shishani detained in Istanbul". OC Media. 20 July 2018.

- Paraszczuk, Joanna (22 April 2015). "'Upstart Sisters' -- Chechen IS Militant Tired Of Would-Be Brides 'Playing Games'". Radio Free Europe/Radio Liberty.

- Kvakhadze, Aleksandre (2020). "Gender and Jihad: Women from the Caucasus in the Syrian Conflict". Perspectives on Terrorism. 14 (2): 69–79. ISSN 2334-3745.

- Keser, Ahmet; Ulusoy, Bilal (13 July 2020). "Bırakınız Gitsinler, Bırakınız Savaşsınlar (Laissez Jihad): Kafkasya'dan DAEŞ'e Katılım Nedenleri". Güvenlik Stratejileri Dergisi (in Turkish). 16 (34): 203–243. doi:10.17752/guvenlikstrtj.768605. ISSN 1305-4740. "20-year-old Seda Dudurkaeva fell in love with a young man who had an Islamic thought outside of traditional Islam. In April 2013, the man she loved left the country to fight in Syria, and Seda, who was waiting for a suitable moment, went to Syria after him... Seda was captured on camera while at the Syrian border, but no one saw Seda again after that. Seda's family asked the officers for help to reach the man from whom Seda ran away. The officer managed to find the brother of the man from whom Seda ran away. His brother agreed to help and went to Syria. He found both the girl and his beloved. He tried to persuade them to return, but they refused to return (to Russia). 'Seda was telling her family that she married her husband according to Islamic rules and that she could not go anywhere without her husband.'" quote taken from section 2.5, pp 231-232. Google Translation of the abstract:
