= Battle of Victory =

Syrian Rebel operations room

- Dates active: 23 April – June 2015
- Groups: Al-Nusra Front; Ahrar ash-Sham; Ansar al-Sham; Jaysh al-Islam; Jabhat Ansar al-Din; Junud al-Sham; Turkistan Islamic Party
- Active regions: Idlib Governorate, Hama Governorate, and Latakia Governorate, Syria
- Size: 12,000+ fighters
- Wars: the Syrian Civil War

The Battle of Victory (Arabic: معركة النصر, Maarakat an-Nasr), also known as "Tahrir Sahl al-Ghab" was an operations room created by Syrian rebel factions in April 2015, with the goal of capturing the city of Jisr al-Shughur and the surrounding areas in northwestern Syria, from the control of Syrian government forces. The operations room was modelled on the Army of Conquest, which captured Idlib city, and features many of the same groups.

== See also ==
- List of armed groups in the Syrian Civil War
- Northwestern Syria offensive (April–June 2015)
- 2015 Idlib offensive
