= Abu Musa al Shishani =

- Allegiance: Ansar al-Sham; Jundallah
- Conflicts: Syrian Civil War: Tahrir al-Sham–Jundullah conflict

Abu Musa al Shishani is one of the Chechen mujahideen in Syria. He is also the head of Jundallah in Syria and was the military emir of Ansar al-Sham.

== Life ==
Al Shishani reportedly has roots in the Pankisi Gorge.

He traveled to Syria in 2012 and reportedly had as many as 300 in his group by the following year. He was the "military strategist" of Ansar al-Sham.

Ali Aswad al-Jiburi, an Iraqi ISIS militant, killed Abu Basir al-Ladhiqani, who was a member of the Free Syrian Army (FSA)'s Supreme Military Council, in the summer of 2013. al-Ladhiqani was also a local leader of a rebel group in Latakia Governorate.

ISIS raids on FSA bases in Latakia had started in November 2013, with deaths occurring on both sides. Al-Jiburi killed a member of Ahrar al-Sham days later, and took numerous FSA members hostage. Sayfullakh Shishani found the bodies of the five FSA members near where they were kidnapped. Al Shishani and Muslim Shishani (who is reportedly his brother) worked to defuse tensions between al-Jiburi and the FSA through shuttle diplomacy. Ultimately, a prisoner exchange was agreed upon.

Hay'at Tahrir al-Sham (HTS) sent a mediation committee in October 2021, which included members of the Turkistan Islamic Party in Syria, Jaish al-Muhajireen wal-Ansar, Ajnad al-Kavkaz and aid worker Muhammed Shakiel, to visit with Shishani and explain that he was not a target of the pending operation, which targeted Jundallah. He was reluctant to break his alliance with Jundallah, but eventually agreed to leave the area. Al Shishani reportedly allied himself with Jundallah and engaged in combat with HTS. He was held for eleven months by HTS and was released in September 2022.
