= 2013 Hama offensive =

Military operation

- Part of the Syrian civil war
- Frontlines in Hama Governorate during the offensive. Syrian Government control Opposition control Contested For a war map of the current situation in Hama, see here.
| Date | 25 April 2013 – 15 June 2013 (1 month and 3 weeks) |
| Location | Hama Governorate, Syria |
| Result | Syrian Army victory: Rebels temporarily capture 10 villages, including four Alawite ones; Syrian Army captures Halfaya and 20–23 other villages, including most of the ones previously captured by the rebels |

Belligerents
| (Syrian opposition) Free Syrian Army; Al-Nusra Front | (Syria) Syrian Arab Republic |

Commanders and leaders
| (Syrian opposition) Kassem Saadeddin; Fares Bayoush; Abu Usamah al-Maghrebi | Unknown |

Units involved
| (Syrian opposition) Free Syrian Army; Knights of Justice Brigade | Syrian Armed Forces; 17th Mechanized Division(Reserve) |

Strength
| 8,000 fighters | 2,300 soldiers 1,000 militia |

The 2013 Hama offensive was a military operation launched by Syrian rebels during the Syrian Civil War in the eastern part of the province of Hama, in an attempt to open up a new front, after rebel attacks in the governorate had stalled. The rebels managed to capture 10 villages during their offensive. However, the Army soon retaliated and reversed all of the rebels gains, as well as capturing the town of Halfaya, which the rebels captured during their previous offensive, five months earlier.

== Offensive ==
=== Opening rebel attacks ===
Situation in Hama city mid-March 2013

On 25 April, rebel forces launched an attack in Hama city, where heavy clashes erupted for the first time in months. The rebels started this effort aimed to relieve pressure on their forces under attack from government troops in other sectors of the frontline. The next day, clashes occurred in the neighborhood of Tariq Halab between the Army and the rebels. Video footage emerged of several soldiers being burned alive in an armored vehicle.

=== Army captures Halfaya and rebels advance ===
On 10 May, a cease-fire agreement between government and rebel forces in Halfaya broke down. Heavy shelling of the town started in which 25 people were reportedly killed. Government forces tightened the siege on Halfaya and the town of Aqrab, shutting down communications in the area. The shelling of Halfaya and Aqrab was seen as preparation to storm the towns.

On 17 May, rebels captured four Alawite villages in the eastern part of Hama province. The villages were abandoned by its residents days before the rebels arrived. The villages in question were Tulaysiyah, Zoghbe, Shaata and Balil. Their takeover followed several weeks of fighting after which the Army withdrew from the area.

On 19 May, the Syrian Army took control of Halfaya after rebel forces retreated from the town. The takeover was reportedly followed with the burning of homes by government troops and the execution of 15 people by pro-government militias, according to the opposition.

On 23 May, rebels reportedly took control of three more villages in the eastern part of the province.

On 24 May, government forces raided the town of Ma'arzaf, and two days later captured the village of Rihya.

=== Army counter-attack ===
Following fierce fighting, the Syrian Army managed to recapture the two Alawite villages of Tulaysiyah and Janineh on 1 June. The next day, they additionally recaptured the Alawite village of Zoghbe, after the withdrawal of rebel forces, according to SOHR.

By 3 June, the Army had captured 13 villages in Hama province during their offensive, including the ones captured by the rebels earlier in the operation, according to state TV and SOHR.

According to the Syrian news agency SANA, by 10 June, the Syrian military captured six more villages in eastern Hama. Three days later, the capture of three of those six villages, as well as one other, was confirmed by SOHR.

At dawn on 13 June, rebels seized an Army position on the northern edge of the town of Morek, in fighting that killed six soldiers and two rebels. Later in the day, the Army shelled the base and sent reinforcements in an attempt to recapture the post.

On 14 June, fighting took place in the village of Um Meil, to the east of Salamiyah, with the Army capturing the village. The next day, after fierce fighting, the Syrian Army took control of the towns of Rasm al-Abd and Rasm al-Awabed, southeast of Salamiyah.

== Aftermath ==
On 7 July, the Syrian Army captured the town of Hayalin.
