= Abu Usamah al-Maghrebi =

Moroccan commander (1986–2014)

Personal details
- Born: Abdulaziz al-Mahdali; 1986 Fnideq, Morocco
- Died: 16 March 2014 (aged 28) Tel Jijan, Aleppo, Syria
- Occupation: Military commander

Military service
- Allegiance: Jabhat al-Nusra (2012–2013); Islamic State of Iraq and the Levant (2013–2014)
- Battles/wars: Siege of Menagh Air Base; 2013 Hama offensive

Abdulaziz al-Mahdali (1986 – 16 March 2014), known as Abu Usamah al-Maghrebi, was a Moroccan senior military commander of the Islamic State of Iraq and the Levant in Syria. He was known for commanding and leading many combat operations against Syrian government forces in the Aleppo countryside.

== History ==
He was one of the first to join Jabhat al-Nusra, at that time operating in Syria as a front group for the Islamic State of Iraq. When the Islamic State of Iraq and the Levant was declared by Abu Bakr al-Baghdadi, he remained loyal to al-Baghdadi, despite being offered the position of overall military commander in Jabhat al-Nusra by its leader Ahmed al-Sharaa.

He led many successful battles against the Syrian government including that against Sheikh Suleiman base, or Base 111, in western Aleppo. He commanded the capture of Menagh Military Airbase as part of the Siege of Menagh Air Base along with nearby villages. He also led the 2013 Hama offensive and the battles in Sheikh Maqsoud neighborhood of Aleppo in March 2013 in which rebels succeeded in taking parts of the district.

=== Death ===
He died in an ambush by Jabhat al-Nusra fighters loyal to Ahmed al-Sharaa in the town of Tel Jijan on 16 March 2014, after he traveled there to attempt negotiations with them. According to Abu Omar al-Shishani, a fellow senior ISIL military commander with whom he was close, he was betrayed and killed by a man whose life he had previously saved. Abu Omar al-Shishani said in an ISIL released eulogy for Abu Usamah saying "The gratitude to Abu Usamah from that man was treacherous murder. I swear by Allah you will be brought to task for this treachery". A video eulogy was published for him by al-Furqan Media Foundation in April 2014.
