= Hajjaj al-Ajmi =

Kuwaiti Muslim cleric

Hajjaj bin Fahd al-Ajmi
- Occupations: Sheikh; Activist

Hajjaj bin Fahd al-Ajmi (Arabic: حجاج بن فهد العجمي) is a Kuwait-born sheikh who has been accused to be active in fundraising for Islamist rebels in the Syrian Civil War. The U.S. government and United Nations accuse Ajmi of backing the Jabhat al-Nusra, an affiliate of al Qaeda.

Ajmi is descended from a wealthy Kuwaiti family who earned money from the oil and construction industries.

== Terror financing ==
Since 2012, al-Ajmi has appeared on numerous sanctions lists including the U.S., EU, UN, Hong Kong, Israel, Switzerland, Australia, and Canada for his noteworthy role in fundraising efforts and material support for terrorist groups. He frequently travelled between Kuwait and Syria to deliver money to al-Nusra Front. In early 2014, he offered significant funds to al-Nusra Front to lead a battle in Homs, Syria. Despite being designated as a global terrorist on several sanctions list, al-Ajmi has contested these claims stating that he has never supported terrorism.

He successfully launched numerous social media campaigns aimed at raising funds for al-Nusra Front, his primary beneficiary. These campaigns were both successful and aggressive at raising funds and serving as a donations channel for terrorism facilitators in Syria. This was rumored to be exchanged for leadership positions of al-Nusra Front to be granted to Kuwaitis. Al-Ajmi was considered one of the most active Kuwaiti fundraisers for the terrorist group.

He was extremely adept in using social media for the terrorist group's financial strategy. He initially used his own Twitter account to plead for donations to Syrian rebels in a series of urgent messages referencing his 250,000 followers to a phone number for donations. He set up a Twitter account in June 2012 entitled Popular Commission in Support of the Syrian Revolution. This Twitter handle worked as a means for soliciting hundreds of thousands of dollars of donations in one years' time, aimed at purchasing arms for groups in Gaza, Yemen, and Syria. By mid-2013, he was able to set up another fundraising campaign called the Mobilization of the People of Qatar Campaign for the Levant, which was active until August 2014 when he became a U.S. specially designated global terrorist. Following the designation his Twitter account became suspended, but just two days after his original account was deleted, he created a new account, and even more popular was his Instagram account. His Instagram account was followed by 1.3 million accounts and was used as a tool to spread al-Qaeda and al-Nusra propaganda, as well as a source of income after his assets were frozen from being sanctioned. He told his Instagram followers that he was selling customized posts to sponsors and local business as a way to earn money. Instead of carrying sponsored ads that are purchased through Facebook, the owner of Instagram, al-Ajmi was creating his own ads outside of the company's system, without sponsor labels, and receiving payment from sponsors directly and displaying his email address enticing opportunities for "partnership and advertising." On his new Twitter page, he posted, "Will continue supporting Islam and its people, and praise will be to Allah always. And only believers believe all what happens to them is for their own good."

In relation to his terror financing suspicions, Kuwaiti authorities arrested and detained him at the Kuwait airport upon his arrival from Qatar in August 2014. He was released just a day later despite his standing on numerous sanctions list.

=== Twitter account ===
A 2016 lawsuit filed against al-Ajmi by the California-based NGO that assists Middle East refugees called St. Francis of Assisi, drew headlines for being the first U.S. lawsuit served to a person via Twitter. The allegations were made for funding Christian genocide in Iraq and Syria, the Assyrians. The lawsuit defending Assyrians that have been systematically killed and displaced was against al-Ajmi, as well as Kuveyt-Turk Participation Bank, Inc. and Kuwait Finance House, two banks that he used to funnel money to the al-Nusra Front, for financing a group that killed, injured, and maimed civilians, even within the U.S. defending Assyrians that were systematically killed and displaced. The NGO was seeking compensation at a San Francisco Federal Court against al-Ajmi, who was difficult to reach, on behalf of hundreds of thousands of Assyrian Christians owning property in Syria and Iraq. Judge Laurel Beeler discovered al-Ajmi's active Twitter account, and allowed Twitter to be used to satisfy the service of process requirement to move along the case, considering it was the method of service most likely to reach him. St. Francis of Assisi was given permission to tweet a summons and a complaint to al-Ajmi, in which the documents were stored on MediaFire, a file-sharing service. This request came after a month of attempts to serve him, and a Kuwaiti government rejection of the process. During this period, al-Ajmi had been tweeting hourly, sharing videos with his bank account details asking followers for money. Shortly after his service, al-Ajmi retweeted a message regarding the notice to rally his followers against the non-profit, and his Twitter account was deactivated shortly after. This case was the first to approve serving a foreign defendant via social media.
