= Suqour al-Ezz =

Saudi former militant group

- كتيبة صقور العز
- Leader: Saqr al-Jihad
- Dates active: February 2013–January 2014
- Active regions: Latakia Governorate, Syria
- Ideology: Salafist jihadism
- Part of: al-Nusra Front
- Wars: Syrian Civil War

Suqour al-Ezz (Arabic: كتيبة صقور العز), also spelled Suqour al-Izz, was a group composed of primarily Saudi jihadists that was active during the Syrian Civil War.

Founded in February 2013, due to personal disputes with the and the al-Nusra Front, it originally operated as an independent jihadist group while still cooperating on the battlefield with both groups. However, in January 2014, the group joined al-Nusra.

== See also ==
- List of armed groups in the Syrian Civil War
