= Yusuf al-Maghribi =

- يوسف المغربي
- Born: 16th century Cairo, Ottoman Eyalet of Egypt
- Died: 1611 CE (1019 AH); Cairo, Ottoman Eyalet of Egypt
- Era: Ottoman era
- Writing career
- Notable work: Daf' al-Isr 'an Kalam Ahl al-Misr (دفع الإصر عن كلام أهل مصر)

Yūsuf al-Maġribi (Arabic: يوسف المغربي) was a 17th-century traveler and lexicographer active in Cairo. He is the first author to treat Egyptian Arabic as a dialect distinct from Classical Arabic, compiling an Egyptian Arabic word list, the Raf` al-'iṣr `an kalām 'ahl miṣr (i.e. "apology of the Egyptian vernacular", literally "the lifting of the burden from the speech of the population of Egypt"), which survives in a unique manuscript kept at St. Petersburg State University. Al-Maghribi's dictionary reflects a wider trend in early 17th century Ottoman Egypt towards colloquial writing.

== Edition ==
- Abdul-Salam Ahmad Awwad, Raf` al-Isar `an kalam ahl misr, Moscow (1968).

== See also ==
- De vulgari eloquentia
