= Abu Dali, Homs =

Abu Dali أبو دالي
- Village
- Location in Syria
- Coordinates: 34°41′5″N 36°53′29″E
- Country: Syria
- Governorate: Homs
- District: Homs
- Subdistrict: Homs

Population (2004)
  - Total: 1,300
- Time zone: UTC+3 (AST)

Abu Dali (Arabic: أبو دالي, also spelled Abudali) is a village in the Homs Governorate in central Syria, located east of Homs on the western fringes of the Syrian Desert. According to the Central Bureau of Statistics (CBS), Abu Dali had a population of 1,300 in 2004.
