= Tuffahiyeh =

Tuffahiyeh تفاحية
- Village
- Location in Syria
- Country: Syria
- Governorate: Idlib
- District: Jisr al-Shughur District
- Subdistrict: Bidama Nahiyah

Population (2004)
  - Total: 284
- Time zone: UTC+2 (EET)
  - Summer (DST): UTC+3 (EEST)
- City Qrya Pcode: C4224

Tuffahiyeh (Arabic: تفاحية) is a Syrian village located in Bidama Nahiyah in Jisr al-Shughur District, Idlib. According to the Syria Central Bureau of Statistics (CBS), Tuffahiyeh had a population of 284 in the 2004 census.

As of 6 February 2025, the village is deserted.
