= Jundallah (Syria) =

Militant group

- جندالله
- Leaders: Abu Khalil Azari; Abu Musa al Shishani
- Dates active: 2015- 2021
- Headquarters: al-Mohandisin, Aleppo Governorate al-Dana,Idlib Governorate; Turkmen Mountain
- Ideology: Salafi jihadism
- Size: 100-150
- Wars: Syrian civil war

Jundallah (Arabic: جندالله) was a Jihadist group in Syria during the Syrian civil war.

After an operation launched by Hay'at Tahrir al-Sham (HTS) against it on 25 October 2021, which resulted in the group being dismantled.

== History ==
Jundallah was founded in 2014 or 2015 under the name Jund al-Khilafa by Azeris named Abu Fatima al-Turki and Abu Hanifa al-Azari.

HTS fought against the group in November 2021, following failed negotiations, and dissolved it. The group's leader, Abu Musa al Shishani, was arrested in Kherbet Eljoz while trying to escape to Turkey.
