= Abu Dali, Hama =

Abu Dali أبو دالي
- Village
- Location in Syria
- Coordinates: 35.032455°N 37.395739°E
- Country: Syria
- Governorate: Hama
- District: Salamiyah District
- Subdistrict: Uqayribat Subdistrict

Population (2004)
  - Total: 288
- Time zone: UTC+3 (AST)
- City Qrya Pcode: C3316

Abu Dali (Arabic: أبو دالي) is a Syrian village located in Uqayribat Subdistrict in Salamiyah District, Hama. According to the Syria Central Bureau of Statistics (CBS), Abu Dali had a population of 288 in the 2004 census. Abu Dali was captured by Syrian Army on 7 September 2017.
