= Sayfullakh Shishani =

Chechen mujahideen (d. 2014)

Ruslan Machalikashvili (? – February 2014), commonly known by his nom de guerre Sayfullakh Shishani, was one of the Chechen mujahideen in Syria from 2012 until his death in February 2014.

== Life ==
Shishani was born Ruslan Machalikashvili and took up the nom de guerre Sayfullakh Shishani. He lived in Turkey, taking part in demonstrations in Istanbul and was part of the Chechen diaspora there. He was fluent in Turkish. Unlike other Chechen fighters, he had no previous combat experience before arriving in Syria in 2012. However, after his death, a confidant claimed that he had fought both in Chechnya and Afghanistan. Shishani met Abu Omar al-Shishani sometime after arriving in Syria, where they were initially close and worked together in Jaish al-Muhajireen wal-Ansar (JMWA).

He was expelled from JMWA in August 2013 by al-Shishani, reportedly over whether the group should remain independent or pledge allegiance to ISIS, with Shishani favoring independence.

He initially formed a group named "Mujahideen Kavkaz fi Sham" in September, though the following month, he announced that it would be known as Jaish Khilafah al-Islamiyya. It was briefly independent until the group pledged allegiance to the Al-Nusra Front in December 2013. His fighters were trained by Muslim Shishani.

== Death ==
Shishani was killed in Aleppo Governorate in February 2014, during a raid on Aleppo Central Prison, which he viewed as a condition of swearing Bay'ah to join Al-Nusra Front. He may have died from a shrapnel wound.

He was eulogized by Abu Mohammad al-Julani, the leader of the Al-Nusra Front.

Shishani was succeeded by Mohammed Khorasani.
