= Abu Omar al-Shishani =

Islamist warlord

- Abu Omar al-Shishani during the Syrian Civil War
- Born: Tarkhan Tayumurazovich Batirashvili; 11 January 1986; Birkiani, Georgian SSR, Soviet Union
- Died: 10 July 2016 (aged 30); Al-Shirqat, Saladin Governorate, Iraq
- Spouse: Seda Dudurkaeva
- Military career
- Allegiance: Georgia (2006–2010); Jaish al-Muhajireen wal-Ansar (2012–2013); Islamic State (May 2013 – July 2016)
- Branch: Georgian Land Forces; Military of the Islamic State
- Rank: Sergeant (Georgia); Field Commander (ISIS)
- Commands: Syria, Iraq
- Conflicts: Russo-Georgian War; Battle of Tskhinvali; Syrian civil war; Battle of Aleppo (2012–2016); Siege of Menagh Air Base; Northern Aleppo offensive (February–July 2014); Battle of Tabqa Airbase; Siege of Kobanî; Eastern Hasakah offensive; Battle of Sarrin (June–July 2015)

Tarkhan Tayumurazovich Batirashvili (Georgian: თარხან ბათირაშვილი; 11 January 1986 – 10 July 2016), known by his nom de guerre Abu Omar al-Shishani (Arabic: أَبُو عُمَرَ ٱلشِّيشَانِيِّ, romanized: ʾAbū ʿUmar aš-Šīšānī) or Omar al-Shishani, was a Georgian-Chechen jihadist who, as one of the Chechen mujahideen in Syria, served as the leader of the Muhajireen Battalion before defecting and becoming a commander for the Islamic State, and was previously a sergeant in the Georgian Army.

A veteran of the 2008 Russo-Georgian War, Batirashvili became a jihadist after being discharged from the Georgian military and served in various command positions with Islamist militant groups fighting in the Syrian Civil War. He became the leader of the Muhajireen Brigade (Emigrants Brigade), and its successor, Jaish al-Muhajireen wal-Ansar (Army of Emigrants and Supporters). In 2013, Batirashvili joined the Islamic State of Iraq and the Levant and rapidly became a senior commander in the organization, directing a series of battles and ultimately earning a seat on ISIL's shura council.

The US Treasury Department added Batirashvili to its list of Specially Designated Global Terrorists on 24 September 2014, and seven months later the US government announced a reward up to US$5 million for information leading to his capture. There were several reports of his death throughout 2015 and 2016. The Islamic State announced that he was killed in combat in the Iraqi city of Al-Shirqat, south of Mosul while the Pentagon said that Shishani had likely been killed in U.S. coalition air strikes in Syria, but could not confirm or deny it.

== Early life ==
Tarkhan Tayumurazovich Batirashvili was born in the Georgian SSR, Soviet Union (now Georgia) in 1986. His mother was a Kist—an ethnic Chechen subgroup from Georgia's Pankisi Gorge—of the Mastoy clan. His father, Teimuraz Batirashvili was an ethnic Georgian Orthodox Christian.

Batirashvili grew up in the largely Kist-populated Muslim village of Birkiani, in the Pankisi Gorge, an impoverished region of northeast Georgia on the border with Chechnya. He was one of three sons, all of whom would convert to Islam against their father's wishes later in life. During his childhood, his father was rarely present, as he spent long periods of time working in Russia, and the children were mostly raised by their mother. In his youth, he worked as a shepherd in the hills above the gorge. In the 1990s, the Pankisi Gorge was a major transit point for fighters in support of the Chechen Republic of Ichkeria in the Second Chechen War, and it was there that Batirashvili reportedly came into contact with the Chechen rebels moving into Russia. According to his father, a young Batirashvili secretly helped Chechen fighters into Russia and sometimes joined them on missions against Russian troops.

== Service in the Georgian Armed Forces ==
After finishing high school, Batirashvili joined the Georgian Army and distinguished himself as master of various weaponry and maps, according to his former commander Malkhaz Topuria, who recruited him into a special reconnaissance group. His unit received training at the Krtsanisi National Training Centre, which included training with US special forces. Batirashvili was reportedly a "star pupil". He rose to the rank of sergeant in a newly formed intelligence unit, and during the 2008 Russo-Georgian War he served near the front line in the Battle of Tskhinvali, spying on Russian tank columns and relaying their coordinates to Georgian artillery units. According to Business Insider, Batirashvili's unit inflicted serious damage on the Russians, and among the actions they participated in was an attack on a column of the Russian 58th Army during which the commander of the 58th Army, General Anatoly Khrulyov, was wounded.

Batirashvili was never decorated for his military service. He was due to be promoted to become an officer, but in 2010 he was diagnosed with tuberculosis. After spending several months in a military hospital, he was discharged on medical grounds. He tried and failed to re-enlist. Upon returning home, he applied for a job in the local police force and was rejected. Around this time, his mother also died of cancer. According to his father, he became "very disillusioned".

== Islamist militant activity ==
According to the Georgian Defense Ministry, Batirashvili was arrested in September 2010 for illegal possession of weapons and sentenced to three years in prison. He was released after serving in early 2012 and immediately left the country. According to an interview on a jihadist website, Batirashvili said that prison transformed him; "I promised God that if I come out of prison alive, I'll go fight jihad for the sake of God", he said.

Batirashvili reportedly told his father that he was leaving for Istanbul in Turkey, where members of the Chechen diaspora were ready to recruit him to lead fighters inside war-ravaged Syria; an older brother had already gone to Syria some months before. In an interview, Batirashvili said that he had considered going to Yemen and briefly lived in Egypt before ultimately arriving in Syria in March 2012.

=== Muhajireen Brigade ===
His first command was the Muhajireen Brigade, an Islamist jihadist group made up of foreign fighters that was formed in the summer of 2012. His unit became involved in the Battle of Aleppo, and in October 2012, they assisted the Al-Nusra Front in a raid on an air defense and Scud missile base in Aleppo.

In December 2012, they fought alongside al-Nusra Front during the overrunning of the Sheikh Suleiman Army base in Western Aleppo. In February 2013, together with the Tawhid Brigades and al-Nusra Front, they stormed the base of the Syrian Army's 80th Regiment, near the main airport in Aleppo.

In March 2013, Kavkaz Center reported that the Muhajireen Brigade had merged with two Syrian jihadist groups called Jaish Muhammad and Kataeb Khattab to form a new group called Jaish al-Muhajireen wal-Ansar, or Army of Emigrants and Helpers. The group played a key role in the August 2013 capture of Menagh Air Base, which culminated in a Vehicle Borne Improvised Explosive Device (VBIED) driven by two of their members killing and wounding many of the last remaining Syrian Arab Armed Forces defenders within the airbase. A branch of the Muhajireen Brigade was involved in the 2013 Latakia offensive.

=== Islamic State ===
In May 2013, Batirashvili was appointed northern commander for the Islamic State of Iraq and the Levant, with authority over its military operations and forces in northern Syria, specifically Aleppo, Raqqa, Latakia, and northern Idlib Provinces. By late 2013, he was the ISIL emir (leader) for northern Syria and was operating in and around Aleppo Province particularly out of al-Bab. He was also in charge of foreign ISIL fighters from Chechnya and elsewhere in the Caucasus. Units under his command participated in major assaults on Syrian military bases in and around Aleppo, including the capture of Menagh Air Base in August 2013. He was considered "one of the most influential military leaders of the Syrian opposition forces". By mid-2014, Batirashvili was a senior ISIL commander and Shura Council member based in Raqqa, Syria.

In August 2013, Batirashvili released a statement announcing the expulsion of one of his commanders, Emir Seyfullah, and 27 of his fighters. Batirashvili accused the men of embezzlement and stirring up the animosity of local Syrians against the foreign fighters by indulging in takfir—excommunication—against other Muslims. However, Seyfullah denied these allegations and claimed that the dispute was due to his refusal to join ISIL with Batirashvili. In late 2013, Batirashvili was replaced as leader of Jaish al-Muhajireen wal-Ansar by another Chechen commander known as Salahuddin Shishani, as most of the Chechen members of the group did not support Batirashvili's support of ISIL, due to their preexisting oath to the Caucasus Emirate militant group and its leader Dokka Umarov. At the onset of 2014, Batirashvili was ordered to take over command of all ISIL forces in the Deir ez-Zor Governorate who were besieging the Syrian government soldiers stationed there. By mid-2014, Batirashvili was a senior ISIL commander and Shura Council member operating in their stronghold of Raqqa, Syria. During this time, Batirashvili came to be known for using swarming and human wave tactics, most notably during the Siege of Menagh Air Base and Battle of Al-Tabqa airbase. He would use raw recruits for assaults, reasoning that the enemy would eventually be overwhelmed or run out of ammunition regardless of the casualties among ISIL fighters. Regional expert Joanna Paraszczuk sarcastically remarked that Batirashvili's approach was based on the belief that "everyone want[s] to be a Shahid" (martyr).

According to his father, Batirashvili called him once since he left for Syria to tell him that he was now married to a Chechen woman and had a daughter named Sophia. As of mid-2014, Batirashvili lived with his family in a large villa owned by a businessman in the town of Huraytan, just northwest of Aleppo. He is said to have overseen the group's prison facility inside their capital Raqqa, where foreign hostages may have been held. By 2016, Batirashvili led special forces battalions of the Islamic State, in particular a unit named "the group of the central directorate", which appeared to be the primary special forces strike force of the group.

== Death ==
Batirashvili was reported killed on numerous occasions. In 2014, there were reports that he had been killed in various parts of Syria and Iraq in May, June, August and October, all of which proved to be untrue. On 13 November 2014, Chechen leader Ramzan Kadyrov posted on his personal Instagram account that Batirashvili had been killed, and posted a photo of a dead ginger-bearded man. However, the man in the photograph was not Batirashvili, and Kadyrov later deleted the post. Before the post was deleted, the statement was picked up and reported on by many media outlets around the world. The US Treasury Department added Batirashvili to its list of Specially Designated Global Terrorists on 24 September 2014. On 5 May 2015, The U.S. State Department Rewards for Justice Program announced a reward up to US$5 million for information leading to his capture.

There were further reports of his death in 2015: in May, June and October. On 27 December Russian News Agency TASS, quoting EIN news, claimed that American special forces had captured Batirashvili near Kirkuk in Iraq. This report was denied by a US Department of Defense spokesman.

In March 2016, several unnamed U.S. officials told CNN that Batirashvili may have been killed in a targeted airstrike on 4 March near the Syrian town of al-Shadadi; however, they were unable to confirm his death. Other officials said that he had been "critically injured" in the strike, and that U.S. military intelligence were assessing whether or not he had died. On 12 March, the Syrian Observatory for Human Rights (SOHR) reported that Batirashvili had become clinically dead following the U.S. airstrikes, with the IS commander in a critical condition and unable to breathe without the use of life-support machines. On 14 March 2016, two U.S. officials told CNN that there was confirmation that Batirashvili had died after the airstrike. A U.S. military spokesman erroneously "confirmed" that Batirashvili had died outside IS's main stronghold of Raqqa in Syria. IS's media wing Amaq News Agency in a released statement denied that he had been killed.

On 13 July 2016, IS announced that Batirashvili had died during battle in the town of Al-Shirqat in Iraq. The U.S. admitted that their previous claim of killing Batirashvili was incorrect and that they had targeted him again on 10 July 2016. The US was still verifying reports of Batirashvili's death. U.S. President Barack Obama confirmed Batirashvili's death during a press conference a month later.

== Aftermath ==
On 19 July 2018, Turkish authorities announced that they captured five IS suspects on 4 July in Istanbul including Seda Dudurkaeva, wife of Batirashvili, whose father is Asu Dudurkaev of Chechen origin and clan Mulko/Chanti, a former Chechen minister, who was sacked by Ramzan Kadyrov from his position due to his failure to prevent his daughter from travelling to join her first husband, Hamzat Borchashvili, in Syria. On 24 July, Batirashvili's older brother, Tamaz Batirashvili, died from his wounds after being injured by a US-led airstrike in the town of al-Shaddadi four months earlier.
