= Liwa al-Muhajireen wal-Ansar =

Salafi jihadist militant group

Army of Emigrants and Supporters Liwa al-Muhajireen wal-Ansar (Arabic: لواء المهاجرون والأنصار) Jaish al-Muhajireen wal-Ansar (جيش المهاجرين والأنصار)
- Flag of Jaish al-Muhajireen wal-Ansar
- Leaders: Abu Omar al-Shishani(summer 2012–winter 2013); Salahuddin Shishani (December 2013–June 2015); Abu Ibrahim al-Khurasani (June 2015–September 2015); Sheikh Mu'tasim Billah al-Madani (September 2015–January 2025); Mansur Dagestani † (? - May 2019)
- Dates active: Summer 2012 – 2025
- Group: Green Battalion
- Active regions: Northwestern Syria: Aleppo Governorate; Latakia Governorate; Idlib Governorate; Hama Governorate
- Ideology: Salafi jihadism Islamic fundamentalism
- Size: ≈750 fighters (September 2015)
- Part of: Hay'at Tahrir al-Sham (from 2017) Former: Al-Nusra Front (September 2015–2017); Caucasus Emirate; Jabhat Ansar al-Din (2014 –2015); Islamic State of Iraq and the Levant (2013)
- Wars: the Syrian Civil War

Liwa al-Muhajireen wal-Ansar (LMA, Arabic: لواء المهاجرون والأنصار), Brigade of Emigrants and Supporters or literally Banner of the Emigrants and Supporters), also known as Jaish al-Muhajireen wal-Ansar (JMA or JAMWA, Arabic: جيش المهاجرين والأنصار, Army of Emigrants and Supporters), formerly the Muhajireen Battalion (Arabic: كتيبة المهاجرين, Katibat al-Muhajireen), was a Salafi jihadist group consisting of both Arabic-speaking fighters and fighters from the North Caucasus that has been active in the Syrian Civil War against the Syrian government. The group was briefly affiliated with the Islamic State of Iraq and the Levant (ISIL) in 2013, but after changes in leadership, it took an increasingly hostile stance against it. In September 2015, JMA pledged allegiance to al-Qaeda's al-Nusra Front.

The group has been designated as a terrorist organization by Bahrain, Canada, Malaysia and the United States. However, analyst Joanna Paraszczuk has argued that the charges of kidnapping and attacking civilians indicated by the US State Department were unproven; and that the sanctions will have no practical effect.

At the Syrian Revolution Victory Conference, which was held on 29 January 2025, most factions of the armed opposition, including the Liwa al-Muhajireen wal-Ansar, announced their dissolution and were incorporated into the newly formed Ministry of Defense.

== History ==
=== Origin ===
The group was established under the name Muhajireen Battalion in summer 2012, and was led by an ethnic Kist, Abu Omar al-Shishani ("Father of Omar the Chechen), an Islamist fighter from Georgia’s Pankisi Gorge who had fought against Russia in the Second Chechen War and the Russo-Georgian War. While Syrian jihadist groups like Ahrar ash-Sham and al-Nusra Front included foreign jihadists who had traveled to Syria to fight with the rebels, Jaish al-Muhajireen wal-Ansar was composed largely of non-Syrian fighters when it was formed. Its membership came to consist of mostly Arabs from Syria, Saudi Arabia and Libya.

=== Role in the Syrian Civil War ===
The group became involved in the Battle of Aleppo against the Syrian Army and its allies. The group lost ten men in two days in late September 2012 in a confrontation with the Syrian Army; the unit subsequently redeployed after receiving insufficient support from other rebels.

The Muhajireen Battalion went on to participate in major assaults against Syrian military bases in alliance with other jihadist units. In October 2012, they assisted the al-Nusra Front in a raid on the 606 Rocket Brigade, an air defense and Scud missile base in Aleppo. In December 2012, they fought alongside al-Nusra Front during the overrunning of the Sheikh Suleiman Army base west of Aleppo. In February 2013, together with the al-Tawhid Brigade and al-Nusra Front, they stormed the base of the Syrian military's 80th Regiment near the main airport in Aleppo.

In March 2013, the Kavkaz Center reported that the Muhajireen Battalion had merged with two Syrian jihadist groups, Jaish Muhammad and Kata'ib Khattab, to form the group Jaish Muhajireen wal-Ansar.

The group played a key role in the August 2013 capture of Menagh Air Base, which culminated in a SVBIED driven by two of their members killing and wounding many of the last remaining Syrian Army defenders. A branch of the Muhajireen Battalion was involved in the 2013 Latakia offensive.

In August 2013, Abu Omar al-Shishani released a statement announcing the expulsion of one of his commanders, Sayfullakh Shishani, and 27 of his men from the group. He accused the men of embezzlement and stirring up the animosity of local Syrians against the foreign fighters by indulging in takfir—excommunication—against other Muslims. However, Shishani rejected these charges, instead claiming that he had been expelled because he had opposed Abu Omar's plan to merge JMA with the Islamic State of Iraq and the Levant.

Following the announcement of the death of Caucasus Emirate leader Dokka Umarov in March 2014, a statement from the North Caucasian members of JMA was posted on the rebel Kavkaz Center website pledging allegiance to his successor, Aliaskhab Kebekov.

In February 2014, JMA clashed with the Badr Martyrs' Brigade of the 16th Division over the Haritan and Mallah areas of Aleppo. An agreement was then signed on 16 February JMA representative Abdul Karim Krymsky and Badr Martyrs' Brigade leader Abdul Khaliq Lahyani under the auspices of Ahrar al-Sham representative Abu Amir al-Shami, in which the two groups agreed to release their prisoners from the other party and to work together against the Syrian government, and the Badr Martyrs' Brigade agreed to not set up military headquarters in and around Mallah and to hand over houses to JMA, while JMA agreed for its fighters to remain in these houses and its headquarters, not to stand masked at checkpoints which were to be manned by Ahrar al-Sham and the al-Nusra Front. However, on the next day the commander of JMA, Salahuddin Shishani, stated that Krymsky signed the agreement without consulting him and the rest of JMA's leadership. Al-Shishani denounced the Badr Martyrs' Brigade as apostates "supported by the infidel West" through the Supreme Military Council, and rejected the agreement as invalid.

Later in February 2014, JMA joined the Ahl al-Sham Operations room, a joint command consisting of the main Aleppo-based rebel groups including al-Nusra Front, the Islamic Front and the Army of Mujahideen. In the months that followed, JMA reportedly spearheaded many of the assaults on Syrian government-controlled areas of western Aleppo. On 25 July 2014, the group joined with several other Aleppo-based jihadist factions into an alliance called Jabhat Ansar al-Din.

In late 2014, the Saudi-dominated faction Green Battalion swore allegiance to JMA leader Salahuddin Shishani and became part of the group. In mid-2015, Shishani was deposed from the leadership following an internal dispute with the Saudi head of JMA's sharia committee, Mu'tasim Billah al-Madani. In the interim, a Tajik named Abu Ibrahim al-Khurasani assumed the leadership of the organization, though he stepped down in September 2015. Al-Madani subsequently became the new leader of JMA, while Shishani and his North Caucasian loyalists formed a new independent group called Jaish al-Usrah, and swore allegiance to the Caucasus Emirate's then leader, Magomed Suleymanov.

=== Islamic State of Iraq and the Levant ===
In late November 2013, in an online statement, Abu Omar al-Shishani swore a bay'at—oath of allegiance—to Abu Bakr al-Baghdadi, the leader of the Islamic State of Iraq and the Levant (ISIL). The statement claimed that those members of the group who had sworn a prior bay'at to Dokka Umarov, leader of the Caucasus Emirate, were awaiting approval from Umarov before also joining ISIL. The group suffered a split, with hundreds of members siding with Abu Omar and joining ISIL. Those fighters who remained in JMA appointed another Chechen, Salahuddin Shishani, as their new commander in December 2013. The group then fought alongside groups that ISIL clashed with, and some of its leaders publicly opposed ISIL. Following the 2015 leadership dispute, many JMA militants reportedly defected to ISIL.

In 2016 the group's Islamic Repentance Brigade based in Aleppo defected to ISIL.

=== Al-Nusra Front and Tahrir al-Sham ===
Reuters reported in early March 2015 that the al-Nusra Front had plans to unify with Jaish al-Muhajireen wal-Ansar into a new organisation, separate from al-Qaeda. Al-Nusra rejected these reports on 9 March 2015. On 23 September 2015, Jaish al-Muhajireen wal-Ansar left Jabhat Ansar al-Din and joined al-Nusra.

The al-Nusra Front formed Hayat Tahrir al-Sham (HTS) on 28 January 2017, with Liwa Muhajireen wal-Ansar as a member group. As part of HTS, the group fought in an northwestern Syria campaign of late 2017–early 2018 and the offensive in mid-2019. On 19 May 2019, during the latter offensive, LMA emir Mansur Dagestani was killed in combat in the northern Hama Governorate.

== Structure ==
The group's leadership structure consisted of a military leadership, a sharia committee, a shura council and a media arm, Liwa al-Mujahideen al-Ilami. The latter was the same name as an unrelated media group established by foreign mujahideen fighting in the Bosnian War. The name simply translates as "media group of the mujahideen".

The group was composed of diverse nationalities. The Chechen rebel news agency Kavkaz Center described the then Muhajireen Battalion as being made up of mujahideen from the Caucasus Emirate, Russia, Ukraine, Crimea and other CIS countries. Many of them were veterans from other conflicts. Members killed fighting for the group included ethnic Azeris, Tajiks, Kazakhs and Dagestanis. Some Syrian rebels referred to them as "Turkish brothers". One JMA battalion was composed of jihadists from western countries (the US, the UK, Germany and others) who fought together for language reasons. As the group expanded, it integrated native Syrians into its membership. Following a leadership dispute in mid-2015, the JMA split and became effectively an Arab dominated organisation.

== See also ==
- List of armed groups in the Syrian Civil War
