= Foreign fighters in the Syrian civil war =

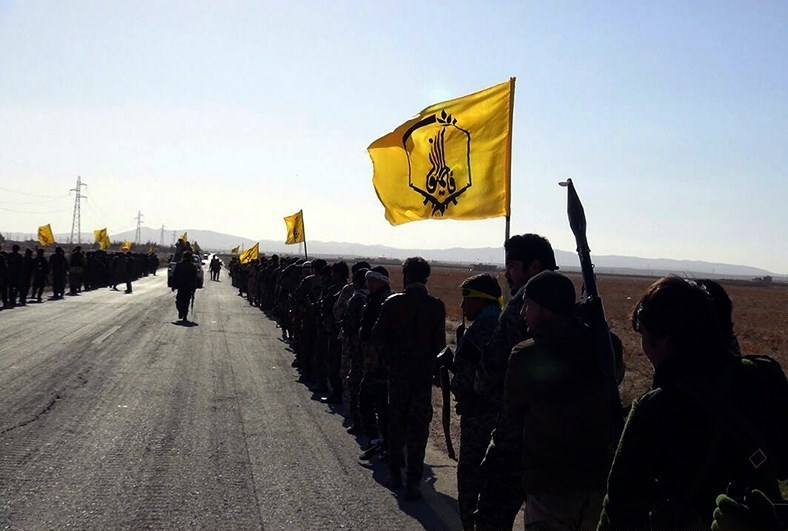
Afghan Hazara militiamen of Liwa Fatemiyoun during the Palmyra offensive (December 2016).

Foreign fighters in the Syrian civil war had come to Syria and joined all four sides in the war. In addition to Sunni foreign fighters arriving to defend the Islamic State of Iraq and the Levant or join the Syrian rebels, Shia fighters from several countries have joined pro-government militias in Syria (assisted by private military contractors), and leftists have become foreign fighters in the Syrian Democratic Forces.

Estimates of the total number of foreign Sunnis who have fought for the Syrian rebels over the course of the conflict range from 5,000 to over 10,000, while foreign Shia fighters numbered around 10,000 or less in 2013 rising to between 15,000 and 25,000 in 2017. While more than 30,000 foreign fighters heeded the call to come to the Islamic State of Iraq and the Levant, not all of these were deployed in Syria, as the Islamic State also held a large part of Iraq for some years.

== Support for rebels and the Islamic State ==
=== Sunni Jihadists ===
Throughout 2014, with the rise of the Islamic State, the Al-Nusra Front, and other groups, their numbers drastically increased and they partnered with and absorbed Syrian rebel groups, both jihadist and non-jihadist. By 2015, foreign jihadists outnumbered Syrian jihadists and other rebels in casualty rolls (16,212 anti-government foreign jihadists were killed in 2015 compared to 7,798 Syrian anti-government rebels killed that same year), a trend that carried over into 2016 (13,297 foreign jihadists and 8,170 Syrian rebels), and 2017 (7,494 foreign jihadists and 6,452 Syrian rebels). However, although the numbers of casualties remained high in this phase, arrivals slowed: according to the United States military, foreign fighters coming to Syria and Iraq in 2013-2015 averaged 2,000 fighters per month, but by 2016, this figure had dropped to less than 500 fighters per month and decreasing. By 2018, the proportion of foreign fighters had seriously decreased (following heavy losses in the bloody battles of 2015-2017 and an increase in interventions by foreign military forces), and Syrian rebels were once again the majority of anti-government casualties (2,746 foreign jihadists killed compared to 5,852 Syrian rebels).

Most of the foreign fighters in Syria are drawn to the jihadist ideology, although experts note that religion is not the only motivation:

From ignorant novices who view the trips as a rite of passage, die-hard militants looking for combat and martyrdom, and individuals who go for humanitarian reasons but get drawn into conflict, individuals become foreign fighters for a range of reasons: boredom; intergenerational tensions; the search for greater meaning in life; perceived adventure; attempts to impress the local community or the opposite sex; a desire for increased credibility; to belong or gain peer acceptance; disillusionment with their own home country; revenge; or misguided conflict experience expectations.

Foreign fighters are drawn both to Daesh and other Islamist fighting groups, such as al-Nusra Front, Liwa al-Muhajireen wal-Ansar (which includes Chechen fighters), and (prior to 2013) Ahrar al-Sham. Jaysh al-Islam rebel leader Zahran Alloush called for foreign fighters to come to Syria, although experts report that the group does not include foreign fighters. On 31 May 2013, Yusuf al-Qaradawi called for a jihad against the Syrian government.

According to the Syrian Observatory for Human Rights, at least 65,726 anti-government foreign fighters (almost entirely jihadists) were killed in Syria up to May 2020, constituting nearly half of the 138,202 anti-government fighters killed by that point.

After the overthrow of the Assad government, many of the foreign fighters that fought for the opposition were integrated into the ranks of the recently established 84th Division, as a part of the newly reformed Syrian Army.

=== Leftists ===
Although they are less numerous than those joining the Syrian Democratic Forces, there have also been leftist foreign fighters joining the Syrian rebels. The most prominent group is the Trotskyist Leon Sedov Brigade, founded by Argentine leftists who had previously fought with the Free Libyan Army, which was involved in the Battle of Aleppo.

== Support for Syrian government ==
=== Shia jihadists ===
Thousands of Shia jihadist militants have travelled to Syria from Iraq, Lebanon, Iran, Pakistan, Afghanistan, and Bahrain, fighting under various Iranian-backed militant groups like Liwa Fatemiyoun, Liwa Zainebiyoun, Hezbollah, etc. These groups fight in support of the Assad government, which is dominated by minority Alawites.

=== Far-right militants ===
Several far right extremist groups in the Balkans, such as Black Lily and Golden Dawn, are supportive of the Assad government in Syria. Serbian nationalist militants have travelled to Syria and joined pro-Assad militias. Black Lily stated in 2013 that many of its members were fighting alongside the Syrian Arab Army. Neo-nazi groups like Golden Dawn and Black Lily have also perpetrated several violent attacks against Syrian refugees in Greece.

=== Mercenaries and private contractors ===
There are several private military companies operating in Syria, such as the Wagner Group and the Slavonic Corps.

== Support for DAANES ==
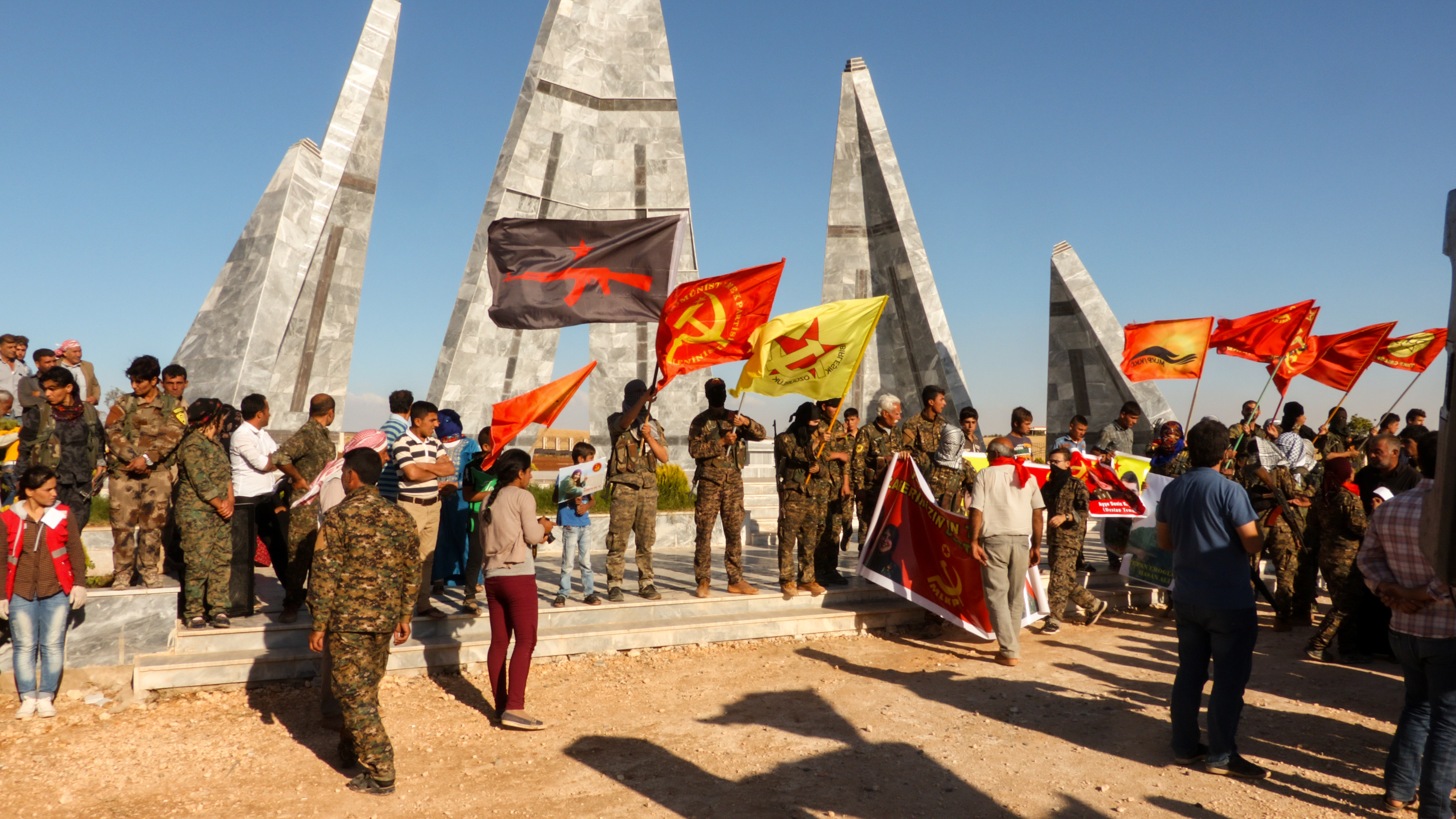
Members of the International Freedom Battalion at the funeral of Marxist–Leninist Communist Party (Turkey) fighter Ayşe Deniz Karacagil in the Martyrs' Cemetery, Kobanî, July 2017

Hundreds of leftists have become foreign fighters in the Syrian Democratic Forces, with most joining the International Freedom Battalion of the People's Protection Units (YPG), out of a mixture of opposition to the Islamic State and willingness to defend the Autonomous Administration of North and East Syria (AANES).

== Passage ==
Most fighters in the various non-regime factions travel to Turkey first before crossing the border, with somewhat lesser contingents coming from Lebanon and even fewer from Jordan and Iraq; some use forged passports to avoid the attention of the authorities. The Islamist government of Turkey, which is occupying part of northern Syria and has been accused of collaboration with ISIL, has been repeatedly criticised for facilitating the transit of jihadists. In 2013, around 30,000 militants entered Syria via Turkey.

Fighters arriving in Syria to support the government enter at the government-controlled crossings on the Lebanese, Jordanian, and (after the Syrian Desert campaign) Iraqi borders, or take a flight to any of the international airports (only government-controlled airports have been authorised for international flights by the International Civil Aviation Organization).

SDF foreign fighters usually cross into the AANES from Iraqi Kurdistan, over the relatively porous Iraq-Syria border.

== Casualties ==
According to the Syrian Observatory for Human Rights, at least 65,726 anti-government foreign fighters (almost entirely jihadists) were killed in Syria up to May 2020, constituting nearly half of the 138,202 anti-government fighters killed by that point. Additionally, 10,045 foreign fighters on the side of the Syrian government were killed by then (1,700 Lebanese Hezbollah and 8,345 others, including 2,000+ militiamen of Liwa Fatemiyoun and 264 Russian soldiers and mercenaries), about 7% of the total casualties for the government side. 76 foreigners have died fighting for the Syrian Democratic Forces, less than 1% of the total SDF dead (although many Kurds from non-Syrian parts of Kurdistan have also died, they aren't counted as foreigners by the SDF).

== Reactions ==
=== International organisations ===
==== United Nations ====
In November 2014, the United Nations Security Council adopted Resolution 2178, which enjoined member states to actively suppress Sunni jihadist movements and prevent the travel of their recruits.

=== Governments ===
Governments have adopted a wide range of policies and measures concerning their citizens who go to fight in Syria. These differ from country to country, with some focusing on prevention, some on prosecution, some on rehabilitation and reintegration, some on deprivation of citizenship, and some tailoring their approach depending on which side their citizens fought. With a focus on more preventative measures, countries have developed programs that focus on inter-cultural and inter-religious dialogue, as well the use of counter-narratives.

==== Syrian government ====
On 3 July 2013, it was reported that Syrian aircraft had dropped leaflets over areas in Idlib province calling on both rebels to turn themselves over to the authorities and for foreign fighters to return to their countries. Later that month, the Syrian government passed a law that would punish anyone entering the country illegally with jail time and a fine of LS 5,000,000–10,000,000.

==== Turkey ====
Turkish involvement in the Syrian civil war is considerable, especially since 2016, when it began the Turkish occupation of northern Syria. Most of the foreign jihadists who travel to Syria enter through Turkey. Turkey was said to be concerned about the presence of radical jihadists on their border with Syria. In a 2015 nationwide poll in Turkey, 3.2 per cent of respondents said they knew someone who had joined the Islamic State. The Turkish state has been repeatedly accused of collaboration with ISIL. Of the thousands of Turks who fought for the Islamic State and then returned to Turkey, only a few have been convicted.

Many Kurdish citizens of Turkey have joined the People's Protection Units (YPG), and Turkish communists make up the majority of the International Freedom Battalion.

In 2013, Turkish President Abdullah Gul said Syria risked becoming "Afghanistan on the shores of the Mediterranean" and that Turkey could become a Mediterranean Pakistan.

==== Saudi Arabia ====
Saudi Arabian involvement in the Syrian Civil War dates from the early days of the war, and by 2013 it was the main financier and supplier of Sunni Islamist factions. Thousands of Saudis travelled to Syria to fight, almost all for the Sunni rebels.

Grand Mufti of Saudi Arabia Abdul-Aziz ibn Abdullah Al ash-Sheikh called for Syrians to be "enable[d]" to protect themselves. He also said of fighters going to the country that "this is all wrong, it's not obligatory. I do not advise one to go there ... you will be a burden to them, what they want from you is your prayer. These are feuding factions and one should not go there. I do not advise one to go there. ... Going to a land that you do not know and without experience, you will be a burden to them, what they want from you is your prayer. Muslims should be fearful of God and not deceive young Muslims and exploit their weakness and lack of insight and push them to an abyss. I advise them to advise as they would advise their sons." This was interpreted as an expression of government fear of its citizens returning home and using the skills they learnt against the Saudi state.

==== Egypt ====
Before being deposed in the 2013 Egyptian coup d'état, the Islamist Egyptian President Mohamed Morsi called for a jihad in Syria. Egyptian military sources said that Morsi's call for jihad was the deciding factor in their support for the coup against the Muslim Brotherhood government, the first democratically elected government in the history of Egypt. The government of his replacement Abdel Fattah el-Sisi, the current president, said that it had no intention of calling for such a jihad and re-established diplomatic relations with Syria. Following the coup, the plotters feared retribution from Islamists, and put travel restrictions on Syrians entering Egypt. In 2016, the Egyptian government began to support the Syrian government. Hundreds of Egyptians Islamists travelled to Syria to fight, and the el-Sisi dictatorship, which has banned elections, is fearful of a growth in Islamism on their return.

==== Russia ====
For much of the conflict, Russia has been the main source country of ISIL foreign fighters, in particular from its Caucasus region. Many of these were Islamist veterans of the post-Soviet conflicts in the Caucasus. Russian involvement in the Syrian Civil War has seen it give probably vital support to the Syrian government, especially since 2015. Different federal subjects of Russia have adopted different methods of dealing with returned fighters, e.g. between Chechnya and Dagestan.

==== France ====
France announced a set of 20 measures concerning its foreign fighters, with President Francois Hollande saying "France will take all measures to dissuade, prevent and punish those who are tempted to fight where they have no reason to be," while Foreign Minister Laurent Fabius estimated that about 500 French citizens were involved in the conflict.

==== United Kingdom ====
In April 2014, the U.K. enacted Operation Mum that seeks Muslim women informing against family members who consider going to Syria to fight. It comes as up to 700 citizens were said to have traveled there, with 20 known deaths and more in detention.

==== Netherlands ====
The Netherlands' officials raised the terror threat level to "substantial" partly over concerns about radicalised citizens returning from Syria.

==== Norway ====
The Norwegian Police Security Service estimated that up to 40 Norwegians had gone to Syria to fight, but that the number might be higher. As of November 2013 at least five are presumed dead and some have returned to Norway. Many are recruited through Islamist groups in Norway and fight for organisations such as Jaish al-Muhajireen wal-Ansar, ISIS and al-Nusra. Both the Security Service and academics have expressed worry that returning fighters might pose a future threat to Norway.

==== Southeast Asia ====
The governments of Malaysia and Indonesia as well the Philippines and Thailand were also concerned about returning fighters. On at least one occasion Malaysian reports indicated that Islamic State supporter terrorist groups have emerged to stake a claim over parts of mainland Southeast Asia. While some arrests were made, some of them had fled to the Philippines to forge an alliance with Abu Sayyaf, which is one of the Filipino terrorist group notourious for kidnapping, beheading and extortion. Many of the terrorists fled from Malaysia are believed to be not a Malaysian citizens, but instead were either Filipino and Indonesian nationalities who have disguised as a Malaysians by using fake identities. Malaysia's first suicide bomber attack occurred under the auspices of ISIS (though in Iraq). Shahriman Lockman of the Malaysia-based Institute of Strategic & International Studies said of the return of fighters: "It is worrisome, yes. If they wanted a safe haven for their training and operations, they could easily go to the numerous failed states in Africa. But they chose to operate from Malaysia, where the risk of being under surveillance is much higher."

==== United States ====
In 2013, the director of the U.S. government's National Counterterrorism Center Matthew Olsen told the Aspen Security Forum that an increasing number of foreign fighters from the West were fighting for the Nusra Front and that they were "the most capable fighting force within the opposition. Syria has become really the predominant jihadist battlefield in the world. We see foreign fighters going from Western Europe and, in a small number of cases, from the United States to Syria to fight for the opposition." He, along with other speakers, speculated that there was an increased threat of attacks should the fighters return home. The European Union's counter-terrorism coordinator, Gilles de Kerchove, said that about 600 fighters had traveled from Europe to Syria and that should the Balkans and North Africa be counted there would be thousands of fighters. Olsen added that "the concern going forward from a threat perspective is there are individuals traveling to Syria, becoming further radicalised, becoming trained and then returning as part of really a global jihadist movement to Western Europe and, potentially, to the United States."

In his 28 May 2017 Face the Nation interview, US Secretary of Defense James Mattis announced a shift from "attrition" to "annihilation" tactics in the fight against ISIS; according to Mattis, the intention is "that the foreign fighters do not survive the fight to return home to North Africa, to Europe, to America, to Asia, to Africa."

In 2014, U.S. Senator Ted Cruz introduced the Expatriate Terrorist Act which would allow the federal government go to court to revoke the citizenship of those who joins or aids a foreign terrorist group. He cited his view that it was "necessary" to prevent citizens to fight for ISIS from returning to carry out "unspeakable acts of terror here at home".

==== Australia ====
Australia expressed concern that veterans of the conflict posed a graver threat that those during the September 11 attacks, while another unnamed official compared the threat to the 2008 Mumbai attacks. Prime Minister Tony Abbott said:

This is a big issue; it's concerning people right around the world. We have an ongoing Islamist terror threat and the situation in Syria has the potential to escalate that threat as militarised radicals come back. I don't say that there is any simple solution to this problem, but the vigilance that's been maintained since 2001 needs to be increased in these circumstances and its certainly no time to be reducing the emphasis on good intelligence which has been a very important part of Australia's response to the terror threat ever since then.

Abbott signed an agreement with French President François Hollande to share intelligence on each other's citizens who had fought in Syria. He made a similar deal with Indonesian President Susilo Bambang Yudhoyono when the met on Batam Island in early June 2014.

==== India ====
The ISIL flag was seen being waved thrice in Jammu and Kashmir. However, Chief Minister Omar Abdullah alleged that: "You have to understand that no ISIS group has been identified so far in the valley. The flag of the ISIS was waved by some idiots, which does not mean that ISIS has any presence in Kashmir." He further noted that legal action was taken against the tailor who made it and those who flew it. In another instance it was waved after Friday prayers.

The entire leadership of a self-proclaimed ISIL affiliate was killed by Indian security forces in June 2018, this erasing any presence of group in the area.

=== Other ===
The New York Times suggested the influx of foreign Islamist fighters could make Syria a new haven for such fighters akin to Afghanistan, Pakistan and Yemen.

The Norwegian Defence Research Establishment's Thomas Hegghammer estimated in November 2013 that between 1,132 and 1,707 Europeans from 12 such countries had gone to Syria to fight, with a majority from France (200–400), the United Kingdom (200–300) and Belgium (100–300).

The Carnegie Middle East Center noted the "unprecedented" speed at which the numbers of fighters have mobilised in comparison to earlier modern conflicts in the Islamic world.

== Blowback ==
Amidst concern of blowback, the first reported case of a former fighter in the conflict to attack those outside Syria occurred in May 2014 at the Jewish Museum of Belgium shooting. Though unconfirmed, ISIS reportedly claimed responsibility for the 2014 shootings at Parliament Hill, Ottawa.

== Origins ==
Fighters include those from the Gulf Arab states, Tunisia (following its own Tunisian revolution), Libya (following the Libyan Civil War), China, other Arab states, Russia, including the North Caucasus region, and Western countries. According to the Syrian Arab Army, by September 2014 a total of 54,000 foreign jihadists had come to fight, with the largest groups being from Russia (14,000), Saudi Arabians (12,000), Lebanese (9,000), Iraqis, and Tunisians. Foreign fighters tend to join different groups depending on nationality: for example, Tunisians and Western-born Muslims favor the Islamic State, while Algerians and Moroccans prefer the al-Nusra Front. Some jihadist groups are dominated by a single nationality, as is the case with the Caucasus Emirate (Chechens) and the Turkistan Islamic Party (Uyghurs), or the pro-government Afghan Shia Liwa Fatemiyoun.

A 7 December 2015 report by the Soufan Group gave estimates for the number of foreign fighters in Syria and Iraq by their country and region of origin based on information dated between 2014 and 2015. The study, which only included foreign fighters with ISIL, al-Nusra and other Sunni jihadist factions, listed the countries with the largest number of foreign fighters were Tunisia (6,000), Saudi Arabia (2,500), Russia (2,400), Turkey (2,100), Jordan (2,000+) while the number of fighters by region was reported to be: the Middle East (8240), the Maghreb (8,000), Western Europe (5,000), former Soviet Republics (4,700), Southeast Asia (900), the Balkans (875), and North America (289). Of Western Europe's estimated 5000 total fighters, almost 3700 fighters were produced by just four Western European countries: France (1,700), Germany (760), the United Kingdom (760), and Belgium (470). Between 2014 and 2015, the report estimated a nearly 300% increase in the number of fighters originating from Russia and Central Asia whereas the total number of fighters traveling to Syria and Iraq had become "relatively flat". The report mentioned that the flow of foreign fighters "is neither uniform by region nor by country", with some countries having distinguishable "Hotbeds of recruitment" with some hotbeds, such as the Lisleby district of Norway's Fredrikstad which is populated by only 6000 people, being small and relatively new while other cities and regions, such as Tunisia's Bizerte and Ben Gardane, Libya's Derna, Georgia's Pankisi Gorge, and Molenbeek in Brussels, "are well-established incubators and radiators of extremist behavior". The Soufan Group reported on 15 October 2016 that there has been "a significant increase in the number of foreign fighters travelling to Syria" since 2014. The U.S. State Department reported on 2 June 2016 that their "intelligence community" estimated that possibly "in excess of 40,000 total foreign fighters have gone to the conflict [in Syria] and from over 100 countries".

The phenomenon causes concerns in the home countries of the foreign fighters. The phenomenon is not new, but the size and variety of origins in this case were unusual.

=== Muslim world ===
==== Arab world ====
In 2012, it was reported that most recruits to Syria are Arabs (Lebanese, Iraqis, Jordanians, Palestinians, Kuwaitis, Tunisians, Libyans, Algerians, Egyptians, Saudis, Sudanese and Yemenis). The largest contingents of about 500-900 fighters came from Syria's neighbors: Lebanese, Iraqis, Palestinians and Jordanians, many of whom fought U.S. forces in Iraq. The second-largest contingent was from Arab countries in North Africa: around 75-300 fighters from Libya, Tunisia, and Algeria.

=== Neighbouring countries ===
==== Lebanon ====
Mostly Lebanese fighters in Syria tended to have their own groups and militias. Thousands of Lebanese had fought on the pro-government side. The most significant Lebanese force in Syria was Hezbollah, which in September 2017 said it had 10,000 fighters in Syria. In 2017, it was reported that Hezbollah had lost between 1,700 and 1,800 fighters in the Syrian war. In 2018, it was reported that at least 1,232 Lebanese Shia militia fighters had been killed.

On the anti-government side, members of Fatah al-Islam and the Abdullah Azzam Brigades were also present though they were fighting under independent banners. Many Lebanese fighters for the opposition come from the Sunni stronghold of Tripoli. The city's Sunni cleric Sheik Masen al-Mohammed said: "The struggle for freedom in Syria is our own struggle for freedom. We Lebanese are part of the Syrian revolution, part of the rebellion. If Syria gains its freedom, then we will also win in Lebanon." He also said of Syrian President Bashar al-Assad that he was an "infidel. ... It is the duty of every Muslim, every Arab to fight the infidels. There is a holy war in Syria and the young men there are conducting jihad. For blood, for honor, for freedom, for dignity. We know of Palestinian, Libyan and Yemen fighters who are active there."

==== Iraq ====
Islamic State of Iraq (ISI) was active in Syria until 2013. Al-Qaeda's central command authorized the Syrian ISI member Ahmed al-Sharaa to set up a Syrian offshoot of al Qaeda. Golani and a small group of ISI operatives who crossed into Syria, and reached out to cells of militant Islamists who had been released by the Assad government from military prisons in May–June 2011. Golani's group formally announced itself under the name "Jabhat al-Nusra l'Ahl as-Sham" on 23 January 2012. Since then, there have been growing rifts between the various factions of al-Qaeda and ISIS.

In addition, Iraqi Shia militia have had a heavy presence on the pro-government side in Syria, in militias including Harakat al-Nujaba, Kataib Seyyed al-Shuhada, and Kataib Hezbollah. Iraqi Popular Mobilisation Forces militias have been heavily deployed in Syria on the side of the government, often with the stated aim of defending Shi'ite shrines. Although at the time of the formation of the PMF, most of its component groups were primarily engaged in Iraq against ISIL, after the reduction of the immediate ISIL threat in Iraq from 2015, many returned to Syria. For instance, in January 2015 Kata'ib Sayyid al-Shuhada announced the deaths of two of its fighters in defense of Sayyidah Zaynab Mosque in Damascus, and the militia's involvement in the 2015 Southern Syria offensive was documented by the Iraqi TV station Al-Anwar 2. In mid-2016, pro-government media reported that Harakat Al-Nujaba announced that they were sending 2,000 fighters to the southern Aleppo front. Between January 2012 and August 2018, at least 117 Iraq Shia fighters died in Syria. According to some reports, the number of Iraqi fighters killed in Syria in that period may be as high as 1,200.

==== Israel ====
In 2013, there was one report of Israeli-Arabs found to have traveled to Syria and fought for the rebels. One returnee who briefly fought in Syria was convicted of "endangering national security". The case was described as "unprecedented", and Judge Avraham Yaakov said that "there's no legal guidance regarding the rebel groups fighting in Syria."

==== Gulf states ====
In 2013, Bahraini Sunni sheikh Adel al-Hamad said that his son, Abdulrahman, was killed while fighting in Syria and that he had "hoped to fall as a martyr". He added: "He visited Syria once, then he returned to Bahrain where he prepared his fighting gear and returned to Syria." In response, Interior Minister Rashid bin Abdullah al-Khalifa said that support should be given from the international community and that individuals should not be indoctrinated and radicalised. It follows calls from mosques to join the "jihad" in Syria. There are also Saudi fighters. In 2013, USA Today reported that over 1,200 death row inmates were sent from Saudi Arabia to fight against the Syrian government.

Bahraini Shia youth traveled to receive Iranian training in camps and battlefronts in Iran, Lebanon, Iraq, and Syria, and there have been reports that a Bahraini Shia militia, Saraya Al Mukhtar (The Chosen Brigades), was fighting in Syria on the pro-government side in 2015.

==== Libya ====
Libya's National Transitional Council was the first and only UN recognised entity to see the Syrian National Council as the sole legitimate representative of the Syrian people. In December 2011, it was reported in the French media that the former Libyan Islamic Fighting Group's Abdulhakim Belhadj's associate Abd al-Mehdi al-Harati was leading a Libyan group of fighters with rumours suggesting some of the Nusra Front's fighters came from this group. Arms from the recently concluded Libyan Civil War were also present in Syria. While many fighters from the civil war were reported to have gone to fight in Syria, several were said to have returned home amidst escalating violence and threats of a new civil war.

==== Morocco ====
In 2017 it was estimated that 1623 Moroccans and 2000 Moroccan-Europeans had travelled to join the Islamic State caliphate in the Syrian Civil War, which along with other fighters from MENA countries contributed a significant force to ISIS.

==== Tunisia ====
Following the first Arab Spring uprising that led to the Tunisian revolution, many Tunisian fighters fought alongside Syrian rebels. In early 2012, Tunisia also withdrew recognition of Syria. Tunisians have been killed or captured in Syria, with at least five deaths from the town of Ben Guerdane, from where many fighters departed Tunisia for Syria. The Syrian government informed the United Nations of the arrest of 26 alleged al-Qaeda militants, 19 of whom were Tunisian. Tunisians are reportedly a large percentage of the foreign Arab fighters in the country. President Moncef Marzouki's spokesman Adnan Mancer said that the government was trying to follow up on the fate of Tunisians in Syria with the help of international organisations like the Red Cross as official ties between governments had been cut. He said: "Our youth have good intentions, but it is possible they fell into the hands of manipulators." In March 2013, an inquiry was initiated in Tunisia into the recruitment of Tunisian Islamists to fight in Syria. In May, Foreign Minister Othmane Jarandi said that there were about 800 Tunisians fighting for the opposition in Syria. He added that "the repatriation of Tunisians can be facilitated by the embassy in Lebanon after the government makes contact with the Syrian authorities about imprisoned Tunisian citizens."

In 2017, it was estimated that Tunisia had contributed about 7,000 fighters to the Islamic State, forming the largest contingent among the MENA countries.

==== Iran ====
Thousands of Iranian operatives—as many as 10,000 by the end of 2013—have fought in the Syrian war on the pro-government side, including regular troops and militia members. In 2018, Tehran said that 2,100 Iranian soldiers have been killed in Syria and Iraq over the past seven years.

==== Azerbaijan ====
Azerbaijan has a largely non-observant Shia population with a Sunni minority. Some Sunni citizens of Azerbaijan have joined terrorist organizations in Syria. The estimated number of Azerbaijanis in Syria ranges from 200 to 300.

==== Afghanistan ====
Afghan Shia fighters have had a major presence in Syria on the pro-government side. In 2018, it was reported that 2,000 Afghan had been killed and more than 8000 wounded in Syria in the past five years, fighting for the Liwa Fatemiyoun, composed mainly of members of the Hazarah Afghan minority. The Brigade reportedly had 10,000–20,000 fighters in 2016–2017.

==== Pakistan ====
In 2013, the Pakistani Taliban said that its fighters, from a variety of countries, were fighting against the Syrian government. They were reportedly working with the Nusra Front and al-Qaeda in Iraq. The group's commanders said that they sought to fight in Syria in order to foster closer links with al-Qaeda's central leadership. An unnamed Taliban commander was quoted by Reuters in 2013 as saying that the group was fighting alongside their Mujahedeen friends: "When our brothers needed our help, we sent hundreds of fighters along with our Arab friends." He added that videos would be released showing the group's "victories" in Syria. Another commander said: "Since our Arab brothers have come here for our support, we are bound to help them in their respective countries and that is what we did in Syria. We have established our own camps in Syria. Some of our people go and then return after spending some time fighting there. The group's spokesman, Abdul Rashid Abbasi, said on 16 July 2013 that its first batch of fighters had arrived in Syria and set up a command and control centre and that another batch of at least 120 fighters were expected to join the others within a week. While a militant said that 100 fighters had reached Syria and another 20 were on the way with an untold number of volunteers waiting, the Foreign Office spokesman Aizaz Chaudhry said: "We have seen these reports in the media and the concerned authorities are verifying these claims by the militants."

However, the Istanbul-based Syrian National Council released a statement that read: "We ask for clarification regarding coverage that reflects poorly on the Syrian revolution, particularly news about Taliban's office in Syria and other news items about Islamist fighters." It also cited the Taliban's Shura Council as denying the news and calling it a "rumor". Specifically, Ahmed Kamel said the reports of the Taliban's presence were a "systematic" and "rapid" campaign by pro-government outlets to "smear" the rebels. He said that these were "sick attempts to make the Syrian people look like a bunch of radical Islamists. Syria is bigger than all of these lies and we know, based on our contacts inside Syria, that no Pakistani Taliban are fighting alongside the Syrian rebels. The Taliban want to kill Americans and Israelis, so why they should go to Syria when we are fighting for freedom, democracy and justice against a tyrant?"

Despite the claims by the Syrian rebels of there being no Taliban fighters among their ranks, several videos circulated in 2024 after the 2024 Syrian opposition offensives, the Fall of Damascus {2024) and the Fall of the Assad regime of rebel fighters who were speaking Pashto (who are likely from Pakistan and Afghanistan), congratulating their Syrian comrades and counterparts over their victory against Iran-backed militias and the Assad Regime.

In addition, large numbers of Pakistani Shia fighters have fought on the pro-government side, mainly in the Zeinabiyoun Brigade, which had up to 1,000 fighters in Syria, until 2024. 158 Shia Pakistani fighters were killed in Syria between January 2012 and August 2018.

The Kurdish Syrian Democratic Forces (SDF) have shared a list of the names of 29 Pakistanis among who are in their custody for fighting for the Islamic State, also known as the Islamic State of Iraq and Syria (ISIS).

==== Central Asia ====
In September 2013, a Kazakh and two Kyrgyz returned from Syria and were arrested in Osh on terrorism charges on claims that they were sent to Kyrgyzstan by the Islamic Jihad Union (IJU) to perpetrate attacks. In early February 2014, six suspects were arrested in Osh, some of whom were said to have trained in camps in Syria before returning to Kyrgyzstan. They were reportedly planning attacks in Osh and Bishkek. Some Kyrgyz fighters that were known to be in Syria joined the Al Nusrah Front.

Kazakhs have joined ISIL in Syria. ISIL released a video called "Race Toward Good" showing Kazakh children being trained as fighters. The families of Kazakh fighters have accompanied them to Syria including children and women. According to the testimony of a Kazakh student who returned to Kazakhstan from Syria, the Arab Jihadist rebels in Syria were racist against the Kazakhs, assigned them the most difficult duties, and called them "Chinese" and there were little feelings of solidarity among the militants. A new video of ISIL Kazakh child soldiers being given military training was reported in the media. SDF reported that they had seized Kazakh passports. The Shadadi emir was Abu Khatab al-Kazakhi, who died in Syria. Kazakh and Uzbek ISIS members invited entire families form their home countries.

Uzbek foreign fighters in Syria include Imam Bukhari Jamaat (كتيبة الامام البخاري) (Uzbek: Imom al buxoriy katibasi) (Turkish: İmam Buhari Cemaati), Katibat al Tawhid wal Jihad (كتيبة التوحيد والجهاد) (Uzbek: Tavhid va Jihod katibasi) (Turkish: Tevhid ve Cihad Cemaati), and Katibat Sayfulla (كتيبة سيف الله), which is part of Jabhat al-Nusra.

Uzbek Jihadist groups operate four training camps in Syria.

Katibat al Tawhid wal Jihad (Тавҳид ва Жиҳод), also called Jannat Oshiklari, is a largely Uzbek group active in northern Syria that was led by Abu Saloh. It participated in the 2015 Northwestern Syria offensive, the Al-Ghab offensive (July–August 2015), Battle of Aleppo (2012–2016) the Siege of Al-Fu'ah-Kafarya (2015), and the seizure of the Qarmid military camp. It was a former part of Jabhat al-Nusra and was still an ally of the group in 2015.

Katibat al Imam al Bukhari is also called Imam Bukhari Jamaat. The Uzbek group Imam Bukhari Jamaat pledged allegiance to the Taliban. Uzbek foreign fighters have flocked to Katibat Imam al-Bukhari. Salahuddin al-Uzbeki is the leader of Imam Bukhari Jamaat and his son Umar, a 16 year old teenager, died while fighting in Aleppo against the Syrian military. A member of Imam Bukhari Jamaat defended the utilization of child soldiers. Allegiance was pledged to the Taliban and their leader Mullah Omar by Imam Bukhari Jamaat. On the VK social networking website, an illustration of a militant aiming an RPG at Santa Claus' flying sleigh was posted by Imam Bukhari Jamaat. The leader of Imam Bukhari Jamaat is Salohiddin. Child soldiers are being drilled by Imam Bukhari Jamaat. They battled in Aleppo and Latakia's Jabal al Akrad region. The Siege of al-Fu'ah and Kafriya is participated in by Imam Bukhari Jamaat. There are separate wings in both Syria and Afghanistan of the Uzbek Imam Bukhari Jamaat.

Katibat Sayfulla is part of Jabhat al-Nusra. It participated in the Siege of Abu al-Duhur Airbase.

Uzbek fighters in ISIL have participated in suicide bombings. Uzbeks make up ISIL's Katibat Al-Ghurabaa.

ISIL has recruited hundreds of Tajiks from Tajikistan.

Once the Central Asians died in battle, their wives were given to other fighters.

70 Uzbeks died in Idlib after a Turkistan Islamic Party site was hit by a missile.

A bombing by the Russians killed "Malhama tactical" leader Abu Rofiq. He claimed to be unaffiliated. He was called Abu Rofik Abdul Mukaddim Tatarstani. He operated in Syria. The Turkistan Islamic Party has operated with Malhama Tactical. The Turkistan Islamic Party, Ajnad Kavkaz and Nusra received instruction under Malhama tactical.

Former countries which were part of the Soviet Union were sending large numbers of fighters to Syria according to Putin. However, data regarding the flow of foreign fighters from Central Asian states remains patchy, with some researchers cautioning against inaccurate reporting, commentary by lobby groups, and think tank reports which are not based on triangulated data.

==== Southeast Asia ====
Indonesia and Malaysia are the main source of foreign fighters from Southeast Asia with an estimated 500 Indonesians and 200 Malaysians have travelling to Syria to fight for the Islamic State. It is also suspected that more than 200 Filipinos, mostly the members of Abu Sayyaf (ASG) and Bangsamoro Islamic Freedom Fighters (BIFF) are training and fighting in Iraq and Syria under Islamic State.

In March 2019, the Malaysian Government has announced that it would allow Malaysian foreign fighters to return provided that they comply with checks and enforcement and complete a one-month government-run rehabilitation programme. This rehabilitation program involves returnees being examined by psychologists and clerics. Ayob Khan Mydin Pitchay, the counter-terrorism head of the Malaysian Special Branch, has confirmed that 11 Malaysians have returned including eight men, a woman, and two young children. The men were charged in court and convicted while the woman attended a rehabilitation programme. According to Ayob, 51 Malaysians remain in Syria including 17 children.

=== Georgia ===
According to Georgia's State Security Service, around 50 Georgian citizens, principally from the Kist (Chechen)-populated Pankisi Gorge, had joined the Islamist groups in Syria and Iraq as of June 2016. By June 2017, at least 25 citizens of Georgia have died in these conflicts. A veteran of the 2008 Russo-Georgian War and a former sergeant in the Georgian Army, Abu Omar al-Shishani, served as a commander for the Islamic State in Syria. Another one is Muslim Shishani.

=== China ===
==== Jihadist foreign fighters ====
Flag of the Turkistan Islamic Party

The Uyghur militant group Turkistan Islamic Party in Syria (TIP) sent a large number of its fighters, operating in a unit called the "Turkistan Brigade" (Katibat Turkistani), to take part in the Syrian Civil War. They have taken part in numerous battles in Syria, including the 2015 Jisr al-Shughur offensive. The leader of TIP (ETIM) in Syria was Abu Rida al-Turkestani.

The Turkistan Islamic Party is allied to Al-Qaeda. Jabhat Fatah al-Sham included Abu Omar al-Turkistani. The death of Abu Omar al-Turkistani happened on 19 January 2017. The death of Al-Turkistani was confirmed by JFS. Iran and Russia were attacked by the Turkistan Islamic Party. Jabal al-Zawiya, Ariha, and Jisr al-shoghur are locations in Idlib where there are many Uighur Turkistan Islamic Party members. Fahd Jasim al-Furayj, a Lieutenant General, Deputy Prime Minister and Defense Minister of Syria had discussions with Guan Youfei, a Rear Admiral

Flag of Turkistan Islamic Party in Syria

The Islamic State of Iraq and the Levant released a video featuring an 80-year-old Uyghur man who came to join ISIL in Syria along with his grandchildren, wife, and daughter after he was inspired by his son who died in combat in Syria. Footage also emerged online of a Chinese rebel fighter in Syria, ne Bo Wang, a Muslim convert who calls himself Youssef. He appeared in a video in the northern Syrian countryside, in which he condemned the Syrian government for "butchering every Muslim here in cold blood, including children and women" and stating that "people have no freedom, no democracy, no security and no respect here, not at all". He also spoke of historical Chinese ties to Syria, claiming that the Chinese government had destroyed the "traditional friendship between the Chinese and Arab people" because they "sell weapons and provide financial assistance to the Assad government."

Eric Draitser accused Turkish intelligence and the government of Turkey of helping transport Uighur jihadists. Uighurs have been allowed to transit to Turkey. A Uighur language version of al-Bayan was published by ISIS.

After Jabal al-Arba'een was subjected to bombardment by the coalition, foreign fighters fled to Jabal al-Summaq. Homes of the Druze religious minority of Jabal al-Summaq's Kuku village were forcibly stolen and attacked by Turkistan Islamic Party Uyghurs and Uzbeks.

Around Ariha, Russian plane bombs on 12 January 2017 killed the family of a Turkistan Islamic Party Uyghur leader and the leader himself. Doğu Türkistan Bülteni Haber Ajansı said that Russians bombed the family of Uyghur fighters in Idlib and the TIP retaliated by firing rockets against Iranian militias.

Chechen groups, Katibat Tawhid wal Jihad (Uzbek), Imam Bukhari Jamaat (Uzbek), and Turkistan Islamic Party (Uighur) work with Nusra in Syria's northwestern area.

Uyghur Turkistan Islamic Party members participated in the Battle of Aleppo.

Children of militant Uighurs in the Turkistan Islamic Party have accompanied them. A Frenchman died while serving in TIP ranks.

A Uyghur language nasheed was released by ISIS. Uighurs appeared in the film. Uighur children appeared in an ISIS video. The ISIS Uighur members attacked the "moderate Syrian rebel" members who were allied to the Turkistan Islamic Party. The Turkistan Islamic Party, linked to Al-Qaeda, was criticized by the ISIL video. Children with weapons appeared in the video. Iraq was the location of the footage. The Islamic State's number of Uighur fighters is much smaller than that of the Turkistan Islamic Party's.

Katibat al-Imam Bukhari (Uzbek), Uighur Turkistan Islamic Party, and the Uzbek Katibat al Tawhid wal Jihad are major Central Asian, Syria based factions.

Uighur foreign fighters were urged to come to Syria by videos released by the Turkistan Islamic Party. Uyghur foreign fighters in Syria were addressed and advised by Muhaysini in a video speech released by the Turkistan Islamic Party. Footage of Muhaysini and Abdul Razzaq al-Mahdi giving speeches were used alongside old footage of Hasan Mahsum in "Blessed Are the Strangers #6", a video released by the Syria-based wing of the Turkistan Islamic Party. "Lovers of Paradise #20" by the Turkistan Islamic Party showed Uyghur fighters in Syria.

==== People's Protection Units volunteers ====
In 2015 was known that at least two men from China were fighting in Syria for the YPG. One of them calls himself Ba Si Pan and the other is a Chinese-British communist named Huang Lei born in Sichuan Province.

=== Russia ===
The Russian security agency Federal Security Service in July 2013 estimated that about 200 Russian citizens were fighting for the Syrian opposition, while it expressed fears the fighters could carry out militant attacks upon returning. In December 2013, the Russian media estimate for Russian citizens fighting for the rebels was increased to 400. Academic research has highlighted unprecedented levels of mobilisation by Russian-speaking volunteers, while also illustrating inherent ambiguities in official estimates. Although often cited as Chechen, due to the widespread use of the Arabic moniker al-Shishani, foreign fighters came from a wide variety of ethnic and sub-ethnic groups. At least some also came from Diaspora communities.

JMA cut it links to ISIL in late 2013, and continued respecting the Oath of Allegiance they had made to the Caucasus Emirate's Dokka Umarov. In September 2015, JMA joined the al-Nusra Front. Besides JMA, numerous other small factions and groups involving Russian-speaking foreign fighters, including some with links to the North Caucasus, are active in parts of Syria and Iraq. One of the more powerful Chechen-dominated militias in Syria was Junud al-Sham, but it fractured in course of 2016. Since then, Ajnad al-Kavkaz has become the most important independent rebel group led by North Caucasians in Syria. The group's leadership consists of Second Chechen War veterans.

As of September 2015, according to Russian Civic Chamber's commission on public diplomacy and compatriots abroad, approximately 2,500 Russian nationals and 7,000 citizens of other post-Soviet republics were fighting alongside ISIL.

As well as the large number of Russians fighting for al-Qaeda or ISIS, thousands have fought on the government side. Up until 2015, Russia provided military assistance and private contractors (at least 1,700 Russian contractors had reportedly been deployed to Syria up 2017), but from September 2015 formal Russian military intervention began, after an official request by the Syrian government for military aid against rebel and jihadist groups. Around 4,300 personnel were deployed, and by September 2018 Russia had reported 112 losses.

=== Europe ===
Both European converts and immigrant or immigrant's children have gone to fight for the Syrian opposition. This includes citizens from France (with the leading number of fighters), followed by the United Kingdom, Germany, Belgium, the Netherlands and Italy. A report by the International Centre for Counter-Terrorism – The Hague (ICCT) from April 2016 shows that there is a total of 3,922-4,294 foreign fighters from EU Member States of whom 30 percent have returned to their home countries. EU anti-terrorism coordinator Gilles de Kerchove said that this was a worrying trend as those who return could be more radicalized. EUROPOL Director Rob Wainright issued his 2013 report and said that the returning fighters "could incite other volunteers to join the armed struggle", as well as use their training, combat experience, knowledge and contacts to conduct such activities within the EU.

European criminals are targeted by the Islamic State for recruitment, an estimated 50-80% of Europeans in IS have a criminal record. This is higher than al-Qaeda, where 25% of Europeans have a criminal record.

The first European to fight for the Syrian opposition was reported by Der Spiegel to be a fighter for the Free Syrian Army who was "a Frenchman who had just turned 24 and comes from a wealthy family. He just turned up here with his credit card in hand." A Michigan-born U.S.-convert to Islam was also the first U.S. citizen to be killed in Syria, reportedly by the government, as she was taking part in a reconnaissance mission with two Britons near Aleppo. In July 2013, a U.S.-Egyptian man named Amiir Farouk Ibrahim (from Pennsylvania) went missing in Syria, presumed by the media to be fighting with rebel forces. His passport was discovered, amongst others, in an Islamic State of Iraq and the Levant base which had been captured by Kurdish rebels. His family was aware he was in Syria, but his father did not believe that his son had gone there for humanitarian purposes. Western countries, including the U.K., have provided aid to the rebels. As of November 2013, there are believed to be approximately 600 fighters from Western countries in Syria. Norway's Thomas Hegghammer issued a report that suggested one in nine Westerners who fight in foreign jihadist insurgencies end up becoming involved in attack plots back home. The associate director of the Melbourne School of Government David Malet, however, suggested that while research on foreign fighters was a new field, different studies showed another view to the likelihood of blowback from returning fighters. "Other studies show that most foreign fighters simply resume their previous lives so long as they are provided amnesty."

Meanwhile, France was estimated to have up to 700 of its citizens fighting in Syria.

==== Balkans ====
Muslims from the Balkans have joined the opposition in fighting against the Syrian government, and some have been killed.

In 2013, it was reported that many recruits came from Serbia's Muslim-inhabited Sandžak region, particularly the city of Novi Pazar. Several hundred come from Albania, Bosnia and Herzegovina, Kosovo, Montenegro and Macedonia. Many of the recruits were Salafists and, though denied by some Salafist leaders, Rešad Plojović, the deputy leader of the Sandžak muftiate, said that "some organisations and individuals [are recruiting Balkan Muslims]. There are centers or individuals who probably have connections with certain organisations, and they are motivating people. They also may know ways to transport them to the war zone. Let's be frank. Many here do not even know where Syria is. They cannot know how to go there and get involved in all that is happening there." Anel Grbović, a journalist from Novi Pazar, wrote that most fighters from the Sandžak had been removed from the country's two official Islamic communities before traveling to Syria. "The fact is, there are illegal organisations recruiting people here. The fact is, there are houses where they come together. The fact is, there are facilities where they conduct their religious rituals – which means they exclude themselves from the mosque. That means they exclude themselves from the system of the Islamic community and are more easily influenced by some individuals or organisations." As for Albanian Muslims in Kosovo and Macedonia, they fought for the rebels in order to help "Sunni brothers" in their fight. At least one Macedonian fighter said he was recruited via an intermediary in Vienna. From Bosnia and Herzegovina, many Bosniaks joined the Nusra Front as Salafists (Salafism came to Bosnia during the Bosnian War with Saudi financing, though foreign fighters in that war stayed on in the country despite controversy). Some of relatives of the fighters have said that the leader of the predominantly Salafist Bosnian village of Gornja Maoča, Nusret Imamović, recruited the fighters; however he refused to be interviewed about the allegations. The director of the Bosnian State Investigation and Protection Agency, Goran Zubac, said that his office had questioned at least eight men linked to recruiting and sending the fighters to Syria, while he said his office was monitoring the Salafists. "If our priority is to fight against terrorism and these activities are a part of this sector, then you can rest assured that nobody in the State Investigation and Protection Agency is sleeping."

In 2013, FTV reported that a group of 52 Bosniak fighters went to Syria since the fighting commenced, though 32 fighters returned, while two were killed. An additional nine Bosniaks released a video tape saying they were going to fight in Homs, though they also mentioned the jihads in Iraq and Afghanistan.

By April 2015, a total of 232 Kosovo Albanians had gone to Syria to fight with Islamist groups, most commonly the IS. Forty of these are from the town of Skenderaj (Srbica), according to Kosovo police reports. By September 2014, a total of 48 ethnic Albanians from several countries were killed fighting in Syria and Iraq. According to the Kosovar Centre for Security Studies, around 60 Kosovar fighters have been killed in combat as of March 2016. As of March 2016, the Albanian Government estimates that over 100 Albanian citizens have joined militant groups in Syria and Iraq, 18 of whom have been killed and 12 wounded.

Macedonian citizens of Albanian descent are also fighting in Syria, and six were reported to have been killed by 2014.

==== Belgium ====
As an ICCT report from April 2016 shows, Belgium has the highest per-capita foreign fighter contingent. The estimated number is between 420 and 516 individuals. This group consists of a wide age range, with people between 14 and 69 years old – with an average of 25.7.

Moroccan-born IS recruiter Khalid Zerkani recruited 72 young individuals with migrant backgrounds of whom most were petty criminals. He encouraged them to steal from non-Muslims in order to finance their journeys to join the caliphate.

The Chief of the 'Coordination Unit for Threat Analysis', Paul Van Tigchelt, said on 28 September 2016 that there are 632 known persons designated as 'foreign terrorist fighters'. Out of these 632 people, 273 are believed to be abroad, fighting or dead.

In the 2012-2016 timespan, of the about 500 individuals who left the country to fight in the civil war in Syria, the great majority were of Moroccan descent according to U.S. and Belgian authorities.

In July 2020, Belgian authorities stripped eight IS fighters with dual citizenships of their Belgian citizenships, after Turkey had warned that IS supporters would be sent to their country of origin.

==== Denmark ====
According to the Danish Security and Intelligence Service (PET), up to 125 people have left the country since 2011 to travel to the Syria/Iraq war zone where the majority joined the Islamic State. Of those who went, 27 have died and some deaths were due to participating in suicide attacks. A minority of those who went to groups who opposed Islamist organizations.

The great majority of those who joined the conflict were young Sunni Muslims of whom some were converts. Those who went were part of the Islamist scenes in Copenhagen, Aarhus and Odense. Of the 22 who travelled from Aarhus, all came from the Grimhøj mosque.

In March 2018, the government of Denmark changed the citizenship law so that children of Danish citizens fighting for the Islamic State will no longer automatically receive Danish citizenship.

==== France ====
An ICCT report shows that more than 900 people have travelled from France to Syria and/or Iraq by October 2015. There is no profile that defines a French foreign fighter, except for mostly young males with a criminal record; foreign fighters come from different regions and socio-economic environments. About 200 were female and a few were entire families who intended to settle in the caliphate.

In 2015 the USMA Combating Terrorism Center identified 32 French facilitators who supported individuals intending to join jihadist groups in the Middle East.

By 2015, 14 of the foreign fighters from France had either died in suicide bombings or expressed their willingness to do so.

After it was revealed that a teen and other youths from Nice joined ISIS in Syria, the mother of one of the youths who was later reported dead filed a civil suit against the French government. The women accused the government of negligence for letting her son travel to a danger zone.

In Iraq and Syria foreign fighters from France number around 689 according to the French government.

In May 2019, four French citizens were sentenced to death by an Iraqi court for joining the Islamic State. One of the convicts had served in the French army from the year 2000, and had done a tour in Afghanistan in 2009 and left the army in 2010.

==== Germany ====
For Germany, the estimation is that between 720 and 760 people have travelled to Syria and/or Iraq. 40 percent of this group holds only German citizenship, while another 20 percent holds dual citizenship of which one is German.

In 2017, the federal police of Germany estimated that between 60% and two thirds of IS fighters coming from Germany had a criminal record, with the vast majority (98%) being repeat offenders with an average of 7.6 crimes per individual.

In February 2019, Katrin Göring-Eckardt from the Green party encouraged the government of Germany to bring German citizens who had fought for the Islamic State back to Germany. The interior minister of Bavaria, Joachim Herrmann (CSU), encouraged the government to strip IS warriors of their German citizenship.

In April 2019, Germany changed the law so German citizens with dual citizenship who fight with foreign terrorist militias can be stripped of their German citizenship. The law also applies to members of the PKK, which according to the domestic intelligence agency is "the biggest and most powerful foreign extremist organization in Germany."

On August 19, 2019, Kurdish-led administration in Syria handed over four children, whose parents were "Islamic State" (IS) fighters, to Germany. Among the children are three orphans, including a boy, two girls, and a 6-month-old ailing girl. This was the first time Germany repatriated children of ISIS militants.

In August 2019, US President Donald Trump threatened to release over 2,000 captured ISIS Fighters into France and Germany if US' European allies did not repatriate "their" citizens-turned-terrorists.

Of 778 individuals who had travelled to the conflict zone from Germany, 504 or nearly two thirds, had criminal convictions and 32% of those had been sentenced for 5 crimes or more.

On October 16, 2019, a German National going by the name Konstantin Gedig AKA "Andok Cotkar" was killed by a Turkish Airstrike while serving with the YPG International branch outside of Sere Kaniye.

==== Ireland ====
As of January 2015, the Department of Justice and Equality estimated that approximately 50 Irish residents have travelled to Syria to fight for rebel forces in the civil war since 2011. At least three Irish citizens are known to have been killed in combat. According to the Department of Justice, many have "participated in the conflict under the flag of fundamentalist and extreme organisations" and "may pose certain threats" upon their return to Ireland and the European Union. The Garda Síochána (Irish national police) "will continue to monitor developments in this area and take action as required", including officers from the Garda Middle Eastern Bureau of the Special Detective Unit (SDU) and Garda Racial, Intercultural and Diversity Office (GRIDO). According to The International Centre for the Study of Radicalisation and Political Violence (ICSR), "per capita, Ireland is probably the biggest (contributor of fighters) of all the countries we looked at because Ireland has a small population."

According to media reports, Garda and Military Intelligence are monitoring between 30 and 60 potential Islamist fighters both in the Irish state and Irish citizens fighting abroad in Syria and Iraq.

Security sources estimated that some 20 fighters may have returned to Ireland as of November 2015.

==== Italy ====
In the 2011-July 2018 period, foreign fighters linked to Italy (among them citizens or residents) numbered 135, which was less than both France (1,900) and Germany (about 1,000). Most joined jihadist groups such as the Islamic State and Jabhat Al-Nusra, while others joined non-jihadist formations or the Free Syrian Army. Unlike in other Western European countries where most of the fighters were born in the country, only a few of those who went to the conflict zone were born in Italy. 14 had Italian citizenship and 10 had dual citizenship. It was noted that the number of Tunisian nationals living in Italy who went to the conflict zone (39) was far higher than the number of Italians. Slightly more than half (50.4%) of fighters linked to Italy came from countries in North Africa.12 of the fighters were from countries in the Balkans.

The wife of Moroccan kickboxer Abderrahim Moutaharrik—who was imprisoned in 2017 for allegedly having links to the terror organization, Islamic State (ISIS)—was deported from Italy to Morocco for security concerns.

==== The Netherlands ====
As of April 2016, 220 people had left to go to Syria/Iraq. The majority of them were male and under 25.

The Parliament of Netherlands voted in 2016 for legislation to strip Dutch citizens who join ISIS or al Qaeda abroad of their citizenship, also if they have not been convicted of any crime. The law can only be applied to individuals with double citizenship. Justice Minister Ard Van der Steur stated the legal changes were necessary to stop jihadists from returning to the Netherlands. In September 2017, four jihadists were stripped of their citizenship.

In 2017 the Dutch security service AIVD approximated the number of female jihadists in the Netherlands to about 100 and at least 80 women had left the Netherlands to join the conflict, the majority of whom joined ISIS. When the military pressure increased on jihadist groups in Syra and Iraq, Netherlands-originating women tried to flee the area.

In the 2012 – November 2018 period, above 310 individuals had travelled from the Netherlands to the conflict in Syria and Iraq. Of those 85 had been killed and 55 returned to the Netherlands. Of the surviving Dutch foreign fighters in the region, 135 are fighters in the conflict zone and three quarters are members of ISIL. The remaining quarter have joined groups such as Hay'at Tahrir al-Sham or Tanzim Hurras al-Deen.

==== Norway ====
On 27 May 2014, a Somali and two Kosovars, all Norwegian citizens from Oslo, were arrested after being suspected of supporting the ISIS. The death of Kosovar, Egzon Avdyli, who grew up in Norway, was covered in the media. He had also been a spokesman for the Norway-based Prophet's Ummah and was said to have left for Syria earlier in the year. He "supported the establishment of an Islamic state in Norway or other Western countries." At least 50 were thought to have traveled from Norway to Syria to fight for the Islamists, with Norwegian intelligence groups said to be concerned of the danger of them returning.

In May 2015 two men, 30-year-old Djibril Abdi Bashir and 28-year-old Valon Avdyli, were sentenced in Norway to four years in prison for joining Islamic State militants in Syria. Valon's 25-year-old brother, Visar Avdyli, was convicted of providing logistical support, and sentenced to a seven-month prison term.

About 70 people have left Norway to become foreign fighters in Syria or Iraq, while around 20 have returned. It is estimated that at least 124 people have travelled from Denmark to Syria and/or Iraq since January 2011.

In February 2019, Prime Minister Erna Solberg said that fighters who return to Norway will be investigated by police and face criminal charges.

In May 2019 it was announced that both men and women who had joined the Islamic State who only had residence permits in Norway would have their permits annulled to prevent them from returning to Norway. In September 2019, 15 foreigners in Norway had their residence permits revoked.

==== Poland ====
In 2015, about 20–40 Polish citizens were believed to have travelled to the conflict zone, most of them at the time did not live in Poland but in other European countries. One of those carried out a suicide attack on an oil refinery in June 2015.

==== Spain ====
An ICCT report shows that more than 139 people have travelled from Spain to Syria and/or Iraq by November 2015 with about 10% of those being female.

A detailed analysis of 20 fighters who had joined before 2014 showed that eleven of those were Spanish citizens and the remaining were Moroccans living in Spain. Most of those who joined lived in the Ceuta enclave in North Africa, but also Girona and Malaga. At the time of departure, most were married with children and were either students or low-skilled workers. Several were known to police for drug trafficking. Of those 20, three Muslim Spanish from Ceuta became suicide bombers.

In a joint operation in mid-March, Spanish and Moroccan security services targeted an al Qaeda recruiting network and arrested four suspected members in Spain and three others in Morocco. The network, whose activities extend to Morocco, Belgium, France, Tunisia, Turkey, Libya, Mali, Indonesia, and Syria, is headed by Melilla resident Mustafa Maya Amaya, who funneled recruits to the ISIS, the Al Nusrah Front and AQIM. Some of those arrested had returned home from conflict zones such as Syria; and in January, a suspected jihadist returning from Syria was arrested in Málaga as a potential "threat to national security". On 30 April, Spanish security forces, working with French police, arrested Abdelmalek Tanem, a dual Algerian-French citizen, in Almeria, who had recently returned from Syria where he worked towards facilitating integration of Europeans into the Al Nusrah Front and ISIS. On 30 May 2014, Spanish security forces arrested six people in Melilla who were involved in a network that sends fighters to al Qaeda camps in Syria, Mali, and Libya. The cell leader, Benaissa Laghmouchi Baghdadi, had spent eight months in Syria and also had ties to al Qaeda in the Islamic Maghreb (AQIM) and the Movement for Oneness and Jihad in West Africa (MUJAO) in Mali. Some of those arrested also had linked to Sharia4Spain.

==== Sweden ====
Up to 2018, an estimated 300 individuals had travelled from Sweden to join the civil war in Syria. In March 2018 Kurdish authorities reported they had captured 41 IS supporters with either Swedish citizenship or residence permit in Sweden, of which 5 had key positions in the organisation and one was the head of the ISIL propaganda efforts.

In February 2019, the prime minister of Sweden Stefan Löfven announced that Swedish authorities had discouraged travel to the conflict zone in Syria since 2011. The prime minister also said that Swedish authorities would offer no help or assistance to people who had joined or fought the Islamic State.

In March 2019, Swedish Television conducted a survey of 41 Islamic State fighters who had returned of whom 12 were women. A third of those who returned to Sweden have since been convicted of serious crimes such as attempted murder, money laundering, extortion, drug offences, fraud, aggravated assault and tax evasion. Michael Skråmo, a Norwegian-Swedish fighter for ISIL who resided in Sweden, was killed in March 2019.

On 3 August 2013, two Lebanese-Swedish brothers, Hassan and Moatasem Deeb, were killed in a rebel assault on the Abu Zeid army checkpoint near Qalaat al-Hosn, according to their cousin and a Tripoli cleric. Moatasem died as he detonated his explosive vest in a car at the checkpoint and his brother died in the ensuing fighting. This followed their other brother, Rabih's, death in Tripoli the previous year.

The Syrian-born chairman of the Stockholm mosque, Haytham Rahmeh, reportedly smuggled weapons to the rebels for 18 months. Rahmeh, a member of the Syrian National Council, a former member of the Muslim Brotherhood and member of Islamic relief in Sweden was said to have bought the weapons mainly in Libya and with support from the Commission for Civilian Protection and then transported them through Turkey to Syria.

In June 2019, it was reported that four foreign fighters who had returned from the conflict in Middle East had become employees of the Islamic charter school Vetenskapsskolan which is funded by tax payers. Two of them were women who followed their children to live among groups affiliated to the Islamic State.

==== United Kingdom ====
Robin Simcox of the Henry Jackson Society claimed that the number of British citizens who went to fight in Syria is higher than during the Iraq War and Afghanistan War combined. The International Centre for the Study of Radicalisation assessed that up to 366 British citizens had been involved in the war in Syria as of December 2013. However, a report from the International Centre for Counter-Terrorism – The Hague from April 2016, showed that there are between 700 and 760 foreign fighters from the United Kingdom. Over 350 people have returned to the UK. The Rayat al-Tawheed group is composed of British combatants linked to the Islamic State of Iraq and the Levant. Similarly, the suffix "al-Britani" was adopted by British Islamist fighters. In May 2014, a British citizen was killed in fighting. The Free Syrian Army's Abdullah al-Bashir asserted that British fighters were the largest foreign contingent of Islamic State of Iraq and the Levant.

During Ramadan 2014, over 140 Imams signed an open letter asking British Muslims not to travel to Syria (as well as ISIL conflict that had spread to Iraq at the time). Additionally, they were urged to make donations to people in the country from the U.K. itself with one such imam, Shahid Raza of Leicester Central Mosque, making the call.

An ISIL video released by British-based Abu Muthanna al Yemeni claimed "We have brothers from Bangladesh, from Iraq, from Cambodia, Australia, U.K."

Around Mosul a suicide bombing was carried out by a past inmate of Guantanamo called Jamal al Harith. Ronald Fiddler was the original name of Jamal Al-Harith, the past inmate terrorist of Guantanamo who killed himself for ISIS. Britain had given him £1,000,000 stg over his time in Guantanamo. The Conservatives gave him the money. He also called himself Abu Zakariya. Fiddler's parents were Jamaican. He went to Tell Abyad.

The United Kingdom stripped some of the fighters of their UK citizenship to prevent them from returning, as this would constitute an influx of militants. The Crown Prosecution Service warned in 2014 that "any British resident travelling to take part in fighting will face criminal charges", although Charles Farr, head of the Office for Security and Counter-Terrorism, said that the government did not want to target those with humanitarian aims, and would exercise judgement in such cases.

The U.K. arrested former Guantanamo Bay detention camp detainee Moazzam Begg for "attending [a] terrorist training camp" in Syria and "facilitating terrorism overseas".

In October 2019, British officials initiated the repatriation of stranded children in Syria by getting in touch with local authorities to identify unattended children and create a safe passage from them to the UK.

=== United States ===
On October 1, 2020, the United States Department of Justice said that they have successfully repatriated 27 Americans from Syria and Iraq. Mohammad Hamzeh Khan arrested by the United States while leaving to join ISIS, declared that ISIS had established the perfect Islamic state and that he felt obligated to "migrate" there. Ahmad Khan, an American teenager, was to meet a member of ISIS in Turkey. Another young American, of 17 years-old, acknowledged distributing nearly 7 thousand tweets in support of ISIS, as well as aiding the immigration of another youth to Syria.

=== Australasia ===
==== Australia ====
There were also Australians and citizens of the United States fighting for the Syrian opposition camp, despite possible prosecution by their government for terrorism amid fears they could return home and carry out attacks. Australian security agencies estimated about 200 Australians to be fighting in the country with dozens said to be part of the Nusra Front.

There were an estimated 50–100 Australians fighting in the country as of January 2014, with total calculations for the war reaching about 200 fighters. About six were reported to have died and the others were suggested as having returned home. In Sydney and Melbourne, in particular, opponents and supporters of the government have resorted to beatings, assaults, shootings and property, largely along sectarian lines. There were more than 15 incidents of violence involving members of the Lebanese, Turkish and Syrian communities, although in 2013 it had decreased from the previous year. The Australian Security Intelligence Organisation (ASIO) reported at the end of the year: "The situation in Syria, with the potential for violence spilling into other parts of the Middle East, increases the possibility of associated communal violence in Australia and remains a concern for ASIO." Zaky Mallah, the first person to be charged and acquitted under Australia's anti-terrorism laws, suggested: "The majority of Australians heading to Syria are from Lebanese backgrounds. The Lebanese youth here feel disadvantaged, isolated and discriminated against. Many [are] unemployed and have turned to religion as a result." After the death of a couple from western Sydney in the country, Minister for Immigration and Border Protection Scott Morrison suggested those fighting in Syria could risk losing their citizenship, while the Australian Federal Police added that those returning from the fighting would be considered a national security threat. ASIO confiscated the passports of those it suspected of travelling to engage in "politically motivated violence;" from mid-2012 to mid-2013 18 passports were confiscated.

In December 2018, Australian authorities stripped a jihadist who had fought for ISIS and was held in Turkey on terror-related charges of his Australian citizenship. He had left Australia for Syria in 2013. The jihadist had both Australian and Fijian citizenship and according to Australian law, an individual holding dual citizenship can be stripped of citizenship if convicted or suspected of terror offences.

In 2013, A suicide attack on a school where Syrian troops were stationed in Deir al-Zor was said to have been perpetrated by an Australian named Abu Asma al-Australi for the al-Nusra Front. Reports indicated he was from Queensland and travelled to Syria with his wife before sending her back to Australia. A spokesman for the Department of Foreign Affairs and Trade said that the Australian government was aware of the reports that an Australian had killed himself, but could not confirm any of the speculation. He added that the government had concern about its citizens fighting in the country, including with the al-Nusra Front.

==== New Zealand ====
In mid-October 2014, the-then Prime Minister John Key confirmed that several New Zealand foreign fighters had joined various Middle Eastern factions including ISIS. That same month, the New Zealand Government approved "terms of references" allowing the Department of Internal Affairs to suspend the passports of prospective foreign fighters and the New Zealand Security Intelligence Service to conduct video surveillance of those individuals. The Prime Minister also confirmed that the Government maintained a watchlist of 30 to 40 "people of concern in the foreign fighter context" including individuals who had traveled to Syria to engage with ISIS.

In December 2014, the Fifth National Government passed a Countering Terrorist Fighters Legislation Act with the support of the Labour, ACT, and United Future parties which amended three existing laws to give the NZSIS greater powers of surveillance and the Minister of Internal Affairs greater powers to cancel and suspend passports. In October 2016, Key also confirmed that several New Zealand foreign "jihadis" and "jihadi brides" had traveled to Syria and Iraq to join ISIS. He confirmed that some had traveled via Australia and that some had dual citizenship. By December 2018, the New Zealand Herald reported that eight individuals had their passports cancelled, withdrawn, or applications denied under the Counter Terrorist Fighters Legislation Act.

According to a TVNZ "Sunday" programme that aired on 11 March 2018, several New Zealanders including "Ashley" and "Sores" had also traveled to Syria to fight in support of the Kurdish Democratic Union Party's militias People's Protection Units (YPG) and the Women's Protection Units (YPJ), which were fighting against ISIS.

One notable New Zealand citizen who had become an ISIS foreign fighter is Mark John Taylor (also known as Mohammad Daniel and Abu Abdul Rahman), who was designated as a "Specially Designated Global Terrorist" by the United States Department of State in 2017. In April 2015, Taylor published a YouTube video calling on Australian and New Zealand Jihadists to attack police and military personnel on Anzac Day. In early March 2019, it was reported by the Australian Broadcasting Company that Taylor had been captured by Kurdish forces in Syria and is seeking to return home. In response, Prime Minister Jacinda Ardern confirmed that New Zealand would not be stripping Taylor of his citizenship but that he would have to make his own travel arrangements. She also warned that he could face prosecution for joining a terrorist organisation should he return to New Zealand.

=== Others ===
In June 2013, a recently promoted Jordanian Air Force captain was reported to have taken leave from his job and traveled to Turkey in order to fight for the Nusra Front.

Palestinians have also fought for both sides of the conflict with Hamas being more supportive of the opposition and the PFLP-GC supporting the government.

A leading Mauritanian jihadist ideologue, Sheikh Abu al-Mundhir al-Shinqiti called in 2012 for support for the Nusra Front.

Other Non-Arab fighters came from Turkey, Tajikistan and Pakistan. Though they were reported to be callous, under-trained and poor, particularly in comparison to the Chechens. Other Muslim contingents included: South and Central Asians (Afghans, Bangladeshis and Pakistanis), Westerners (Belgian, British, French, U.S., The core foreign support lies with the Al Qaeda-linked ISIS, which is in opposition to the Islamic Front and other non-Islamist groups. Reports indicated the inclusion of Buddhist-majority Khmers fighting with ISIS, including those who studied in madrassas in the Middle East. A Turkish member of the Turkistan Islamic Party Hudhayfah al-Turki blew himself up in Aleppo.

A French national named Ubeydullah was killed while fighting for the Turkistan Islamic Party in 2017. The Turkistan Islamic Party had another member from France, Reda Layachi, who was of Moroccan descent and went by the name Abu Talha.
