= Jalolov =

Jalolov, Djalolov or Dzhalolov (Cyrillic: Джалолов) is a Central Asian masculine surname, its feminine counterpart is Jalolova, Djalolova or Dzhalolova. The surname may refer to the following notable people:

- Bakhodir Jalolov (born 1994), Uzbekistani professional boxer
- Goolshanoy Jalolova, Uzbekistani football midfielder
- Najmiddin Jalolov (1972–2009), Uzbekistani militant
