= 2004 Tashkent suicide bombings =

Terrorist attacks in Uzbekistan

American and Israeli embassy bombings in Tashkent
- Location: Tashkent, Uzbekistan
- Date: 30 July 2004 c. 5:00 p.m.
- Target: American and Israeli embassies; chief prosecutor's office
- Deaths: 2 (+3 bombers)
- Injuries: 9
- Perpetrator: Islamic Jihad Union

On Friday 30 July 2004, three suicide bombings occurred in Tashkent, Uzbekistan. The bombings targeted the Israeli and American embassies and the office of Uzbekistan's chief prosecutor. Two Uzbek security guards were killed at the Israeli embassy and nine more people were wounded in the bombings.

The bombings happened nearly simultaneously at around 5 p.m. Two Uzbeks guarding the Israeli embassy were killed when the bomber got near entrance and saw the guards. One of the guards killed was a personal guard for the Israeli ambassador. Seven people were injured in the bombing at the prosecutor's office and two more at U.S. embassy. No Americans or Israelis were injured in the attacks.

The bombings occurred shortly after fifteen suspected al-Qaeda members went to trial for staging a series of attacks earlier in 2004 that killed 47 people (mostly militants), and conspiring to overthrow the Uzbek government.

The Islamic Jihad Union claimed responsibility for the attacks. Al-Qaeda and the Islamic Movement of Uzbekistan are also suspected of being involved in the attacks.
