= 2016 Ansbach bombing =

2016 suicide bombing in Ansbach, Germany

- Part of terrorism in Germany (Islamic terrorism in Europe and the spillover of the Syrian Civil War)
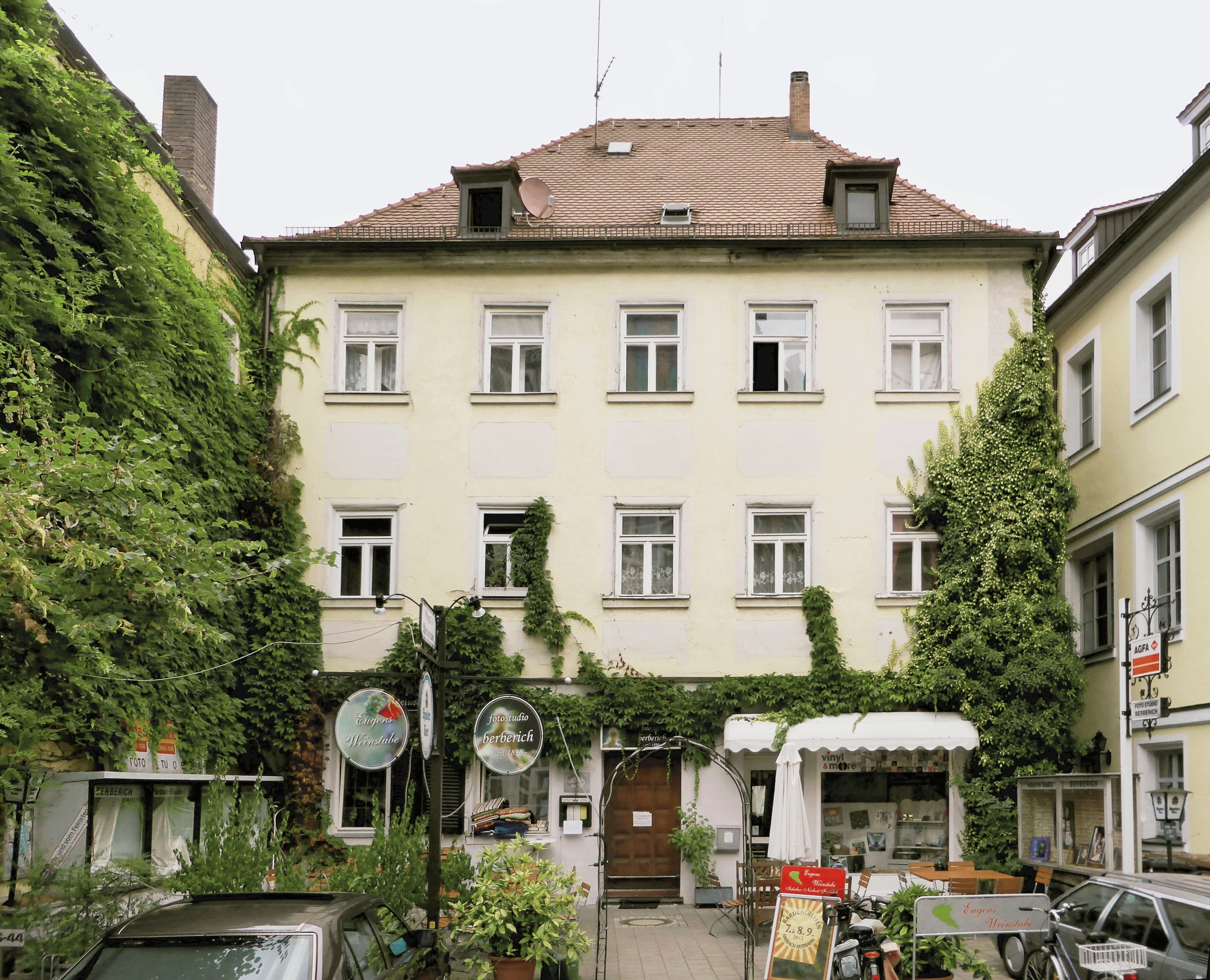
- Eugens Weinstube, where the explosion happened

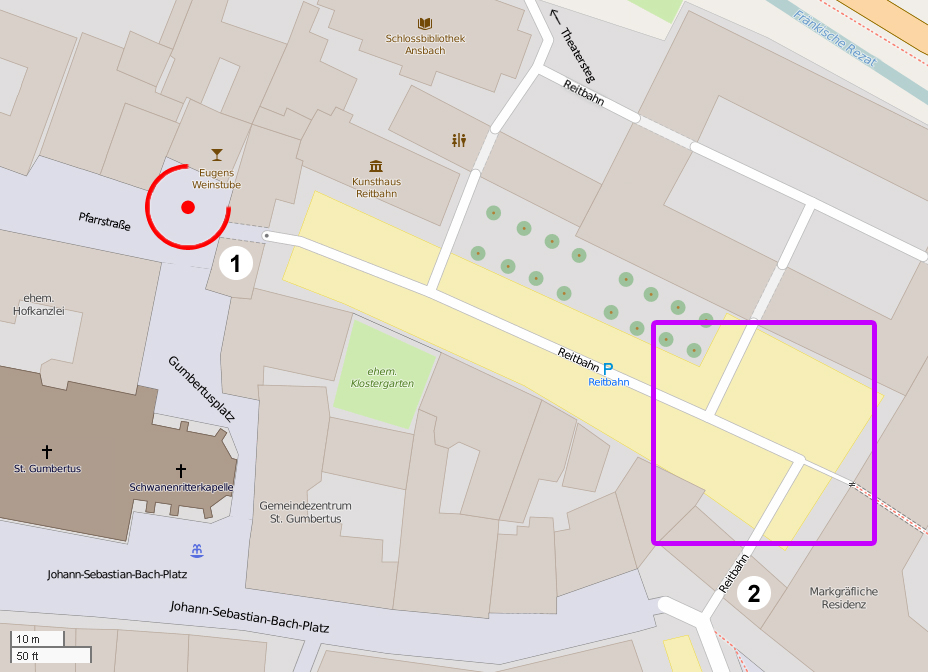
- Site of explosion. ☐ Venue area. ① Entrance / Ticket checkpoint Pfarrstraße. ② Entrance / Johann-Sebastian-Bach-Platz.
- Location: 49°18′0″N 10°35′0″E; Ansbach, Bavaria, Germany
- Date: 24 July 2016; 22:12 (CEST)
- Attack type: Suicide bombing
- Weapon: IED
- Deaths: 1 (the perpetrator)
- Injuries: 15
- Perpetrator: Mohammad Daleel
- Motive: Jihadism

On 24 July 2016, fifteen people were injured, four seriously, in a suicide bombing outside a wine bar in Ansbach, Bavaria, Germany. The bomber, identified by police as Mohammad Daleel, was a 27-year-old Syrian asylum seeker who had pledged allegiance to Abu Bakr al-Baghdadi, leader of the Islamic State. He was the only fatality in the incident. According to German authorities, Daleel was in contact with the Islamic State and had been planning more attacks before his backpack bomb exploded accidentally.

The incident followed three other violent incidents that occurred in Germany within a week. The Ansbach bombing was the first suicide bombing in Germany by Islamic terrorists, and the first since World War II. Cüneyt Çiftçi, the perpetrator of a 2008 suicide bombing in Afghanistan, who had previously lived in Ansbach, is considered the first suicide bomber to have been born and raised in Germany.

== Event ==
At 22:12 CEST (20:12 UTC), a bomb exploded outside Eugens Weinstube (Eugene's Wine Bar) in Ansbach, Germany and injured fifteen people, four seriously. The explosion occurred near the entrance to the Ansbach Open music festival with around 2,500 people in attendance. It was initially thought to have been caused by a gas leak. Daleel was communicating with someone online immediately before the blast. Daleel was in communication with a telephone number in Saudi Arabia minutes before the attack. He carried a backpack filled with screws, nails, and miscellaneous metal parts used in wood manufacturing and was denied entry into the music festival shortly before the blast because he had no ticket. Thereafter, witnesses say, Daleel sat outside Eugene's Wine Bar, leaned forward, and detonated an improvised explosive device. Emergency personnel arrived and attempted to resuscitate Daleel, but he was already dead.

German authorities now believe Daleel intended to remotely detonate the Ansbach bomb while filming it and to later commit further terrorist attacks.

== Perpetrator ==
Mohammad Daleel (Arabic: محمد دليل), also known as Abu Yusuf al-Karrar (Arabic: أبو يوسف الكرار), was a 27-year-old Syrian refugee from Aleppo who had arrived in Germany in 2014 seeking asylum.

According to Bild, he was a member of Islamic State of Iraq many years ago. Islamic State called Daleel a "soldier of the Caliphate".

Bild further says he told German officials that he was a Sunni Muslim and had come from Aleppo. He said he had studied law for half a year and worked at a soap factory owned by his father. "A missile had damaged our house, I was heavily injured and brought to Turkey", he claimed in his asylum application.

=== Immigration ===
Mohammad Daleel left Syria on 16 July 2013. Traffickers drove him to Bulgaria, where he filed an asylum request in September 2013. On 17 April 2014, he said, he flew from Sofia to Vienna on Austrian Airlines, Flight OS 806, Seat 22A, with one suitcase. A "mysterious benefactor" gave him the airplane ticket at no charge. Austrian police seized him and took his documents. On 20 April, he applied for asylum in Austria but then decided to go to Munich on 5 July 2014, where he also applied for asylum in Germany. He stated to German authorities that he had been a victim of torture, a claim of which there is no record of him having previously made, and which The New York Times characterised as appearing to be "embellishments" he made.

German officials and the local court in Ansbach rejected his first asylum request on 2 December 2014 and ordered his deportation to Bulgaria. Normal procedure in Germany did not allow Daleel to be deported to his home country due to the ongoing Syrian civil war. As he had been registered in Bulgaria, German officials and the local court in Ansbach ordered his deportation to Bulgaria. He then attempted to commit suicide twice and was under psychiatric care. Due to Daleel's mental health diagnosis, the deportation to Bulgaria was suspended. On 13 July 2016, a second deportation notice to Bulgaria was sent to Daleel. As Daleel was part of the Islamic in Syria and was receiving detailed instructions from the group, there were speculations that he may have exaggerated his mental health problems to evade deportation.

Minister of Parliament Harald Weinberg of the Left Party blocked the deportation, one of six asylum seekers he has aided. He said he is "shocked and saddened" by the attack, "Especially since I am often at the Eugene Weinstube and am familiar with many guests there," but given what he knew at that time he believed he had done the right thing. Due to Daleel's mental health diagnosis, the deportation to Bulgaria was suspended. On 13 July 2016, a second deportation notice to Bulgaria was sent to Daleel.

Axel von Maltitz, a trauma specialist, wrote a report in 2015 where he warned about Daleel's "extreme spirit" and stated «attempts to deport Mr Daleel could result in a "spectacular" suicide attempt». The report was sent to the Federal Office for Migration and Refugees.

Paul Cruickshank, the Editor-in-Chief of CTC Sentinel, a publication of the Combating Terrorism Center at West Point, has suggested Daleel 'faked or exaggerated' any mental health problems in an attempt to stay in Germany.

Daleel had been treated around 6 months in an institution called "Exilio e.V." in Lindau by heilpraktikers which claims to offer holistic health treatment "for immigrants" under the leadership of Gisela von Maltitz and Axel von Maltitz. Purportedly, the institution does not include any qualified Doctor of Medicine, psychologist or psychiatrist. The institution has been criticized for using "dubious" practices such as rebirthing.

=== Other allegations ===
It was claimed that Daleel had once attempted to firebomb a German immigration office, but been dissuaded by an aide assigned him (as a refugee asylum applicant) to "help him adapt in Germany".

== Preparation for the bombing ==
It was alleged that Daleel built the explosive device "in the refugee center", and that it took him three months, during which period German police raided the building he was living in but failed to arrest him. He was in constant contact with "one of the soldiers" of IS.

Daleel conducted reconnaissance of the location a day before the attack. He also sent a video to the Islamic State, which was released by Amaq News Agency.

== Aftermath ==
The music festival was cancelled and the immediate vicinity in which the bombing occurred was evacuated.

=== Investigation ===
German authorities have found a video showing Daleel pledging allegiance to the leader of the Islamic State, Abu Bakr al-Baghdadi, and intending to attack Germans on his phone. Multiple cell phones, SIM cards, a notebook, and six Facebook accounts with Islamist material that belonged to Daleel were also discovered and under investigation. Furthermore, inside the asylum accommodation in which the attacker lived, materials for bomb building were uncovered. Joachim Herrmann, the Bavarian interior minister, said that "it is unquestionable that it is a terror attack with corresponding Islamist convictions of the perpetrator."

Less than an hour after media reported that the attacker had made a pledge of allegiance to Abu Bakr al-Baghdadi, the Amaq News Agency called him an Islamic State fighter who executed the operation in response to calls to target countries of the coalition that fights Islamic State.

The attack came to be considered a "lone wolf attack."

=== Reactions ===
As a result of the recent attacks in Germany, the hashtag #Merkelsommer and phrase "Merkel summer" trended on Twitter starting on 25 July 2016 and appeared in other social media. Experts believed that the recent attacks could create an anti-foreigner sentiment in the country, thus presenting criticism and pressure for Angela Merkel, the Chancellor of Germany since 2005.

Joachim Herrmann acknowledged that it was "a very terrible week, as I think it was for most of the people in Bavaria." He said that German authorities would investigate ways to prevent abuse of the asylum system.

== See also ==
- List of Islamist terrorist attacks
- Ansbach school attack
- Munich knife attack (10 May 2016)
- Immigration and crime in Germany
