= Islamic Jihad Union =

Militant Islamist organization in northwest Pakistan

Islamic Jihad Union (IJU)
- Flag of the Islamic Jihad Union in Uzbekistan
- Leaders: Najmiddin Jalolov †; Abu Omar al-Turkistani †; Akhtar Mansour †; Ilimbek Mamatov
- Dates active: 2002–present
- Split from: Islamic Movement of Uzbekistan
- Merged into: Syrian Armed Forces (Syrian faction); Afghan Armed Forces (Taliban, Afghan faction)
- Allegiance: Islamic Emirate of Afghanistan (since 2015)
- Headquarters: North Waziristan, Pakistan (historical); Idlib, Syria (before the Syrian rebel takeover and fall of Assad); Badakhshan, Afghanistan (after the Taliban takeover)
- Ideology: Sunni Islamism; Qutbism; Salafi jihadism; Wahabism; Pan-Islamism
- Size: 250 (2023, in Afghanistan)
- Wars: Terrorism in Uzbekistan, War in Afghanistan (2001–present)

The Islamic Jihad Union (IJU; Arabic: اتحاد الجهاد الإسلامي, romanized: Ittiḥad al-Jihad al-Islāmī) is a militant Islamist organization founded in 2002 as a splinter group of the Islamic Movement of Uzbekistan (IMU). It was Headquartered in North Waziristan, a mountainous region of northwest Pakistan, bordering Afghanistan it was based in Badakhshan in 2021. The group had been affiliated with both Al-Qaeda and the Taliban.

Under its original name Islamic Jihad Group (IJG; Arabic: جماعة الجهاد الاسلامي, romanized: Jama'at al-Jihad al-Islāmī), the group conducted several attacks in Uzbekistan. In 2007, a large-scale bomb plot in Germany, known as the "Sauerland terror cell", was discovered by German security authorities. In the following years, the group focused on fighting Pakistani forces in the tribal areas, and NATO and Afghan forces in Afghanistan.

Recruits are mainly Turks both from Turkey and the Turkish communities in Western Europe, but also European converts to Islam, particularly in German-speaking countries.

It is likely that some members of the Syrian branch, have become part of the Syrian transitional government's new 84th Division.

== History ==
=== Islamic Jihad Group ===
The IJG was founded in March 2002 as a splinter group from the Islamic Movement of Uzbekistan (IMU), by members of the IMU who wanted to focus on Uzbekistan instead of joining the "global jihad" of Al-Qaeda. Under its initial name Islamic Jihad Group, the new group settled in North Waziristan and took headquarters in Mir Ali.

IJG set off a series of bombs from 28 March to 1 April 2004 in Uzbekistan, killing 47 people, and had terror cells in Kyrgyzstan, Uzbekistan, and Russia. IJG members trained at terror camps in Pakistan and Kazakhstan. The IJG bombed the Israeli and U.S. embassies and the Uzbek Prosecutor-General's Office in Tashkent, Uzbekistan on 30 July 2004, saying they targeted "apostate" governments. Several IJG members were arrested in Kazakhstan in late 2004.

U.S. Central Intelligence Agency Director Porter Goss testified in March 2005 that IJG "has become a more virulent threat to U.S. interests and local governments." The State Department designated IJG as a global terrorist organization in May 2005. The United Nations Security Council added IJG to its terrorism list in June 2005.

=== Al-Qaeda affiliation ===
In May 2005, the group changed its name into Islamic Jihad Union (IJU). After this period, it became closer to core Al-Qaeda, shifting its focus towards plotting terror attacks in Pakistan and Western Europe, particularly Germany.

On 13 October 2005, Hazel Blears MP testified before the House of Commons that the IJU should be identified as a banned organization because it posed a threat to British interests overseas. Though some Ministers dissented from this viewpoint, Blears asserted in her testimony that these conclusions were independently corroborated by British intelligence service and security service sources, and that many UN members expressed concern regarding the IJG.

=== Sauerland-Gruppe ===
In 2007 three terrorists were arrested in Germany after being suspected of plans to attack the Frankfurt International airport and US-Military installations such as Ramstein Air Base. The three persons were directly affiliated with the Islamic Jihad Group.

In 2008 two suspected IJU members were arrested at Germany's Cologne Bonn Airport aboard a KLM flight bound for Amsterdam. The men, who had connecting flights to Uganda, were thought to have continuing itineraries on to Pakistan, where sources claimed they would participate in some sort of terrorist training or indoctrination. However, after being held for several days, evidence failed to materialize and the men (one Somali and one German citizen of Somali heritage) were released.

=== Reorientation to Afghanistan ===
Following the discovered bombing plot of the IJU-affiliated "Sauerland terror cell" in Germany, the group shifted its operations again to Afghanistan, where in early 2008 a German-born Turkish IJU member drove a VBIED into a NATO compound, killing at least four people.

A video released online by the IJU's media arm, Badr al-Tawhid, in 2011, showed its members fighting alongside Taliban forces in Afghanistan's northern and eastern provinces, and providing training to local Uzbek, Tajik and Pashtuns. The same video listed IJU fighters killed in Afghanistan, whose names indicated they had come from Turkey, Azerbaijan, Uzbekistan, Kazakhstan, and Pakistan.

In a mid-2015 statement, the IJU website claimed that the group was currently fighting alongside the Taliban, al Qaeda, and the Turkistan Islamic Party in southern Afghanistan, the eastern provinces of Paktika, Paktia, and Nangarhar, and the northern provinces of Badakhshan and Kunduz. In August 2015, the IJU released a statement and photos showing scores of its fighters in Northern Afghanistan pledging allegiance to the newly appointed Taliban leader Akhtar Mansoor.

Islamic Jihad Union and Imam Bukhari Jamaat are both in Afghanistan in addition to being allied with Al-Qaeda. The Taliban also works with the Islamic Jihad Union.

Islamic Jihad Group, headed by Ilimbek Mamatov, is currently present in the Badakhshan, Baghlan, Kunduz, and Takhar provinces of Afghanistan with some 200 to 250 members, as of 2023.

=== Participation in the Syrian civil war ===
In July 2019, according to a report from the United Nations Security Council, the Islamic Jihad Union had operated in Syria, under the control of the Syrian jihadist group Hayat Tahrir al-Sham.

=== Syrian transitional government ===
Following the fall of the Assad regime, the formation of the Syrian transitional government, and the integration of foreign jihadist fighters into the 84th Division, it is likely that members of the Islamic Jihad Union were also incorporated into the division, according to the FDD's Long War Journal.
