= Imam Bukhari Jamaat =

Islamist Salafi group

- Uzbek: Imom Buxoriy Katibasi
- Logo of the Imam Bukhari Battalion Flag of the Imam Bukhari Battalion
- Founder: Salahadin al-Uzbeki
- Leaders: Salahadin al-Uzbeki † (2017); Abu Yusuf al-Muhajir (2017-present)
- Dates active: 2012 – present
- Allegiance: (Afghanistan) Afghan Taliban (claimed by the group since 2017, denied by the Taliban)
- Ideology: Islamism; Salafi jihadism Turkestani-Nationalism
- Size: 500-1000
- Part of: Army of Conquest (Afghanistan) Taliban (denied by the Taliban)
- Wars: Syrian Civil War: Siege of Abu al-Duhur Airbase; Siege of Al-Fu'ah-Kafriya (2015); Battle of Aleppo; Northwestern Syria offensive (April–June 2015); 2016 Latakia offensive; 2024 Syrian opposition offensives; Fall of Damascus (2024); War in Afghanistan (2001–2021): Taliban insurgency; 2021 Taliban offensive; Fall of Kabul (2021); Islamic State–Taliban conflict Republican insurgency in Afghanistan

The Imam Bukhari Jamaat (Uzbek: Imom Buxoriy Katibasi, also Katibat Imam al Bukhari) is a Jihadist group composed of primarily Uzbeks and formed in Afghanistan, having fought in both the War in Afghanistan and Syrian Civil War, as well expressing loyalty to the Taliban movement. The group originally operated only in Syria, where it is allied with other jihadist organisations such as al-Nusra Front and Ahrar ash-Sham, and alongside these other groups it makes up the Army of Conquest, which overran much of Idlib province in north Syria in 2015. Since late 2016, the group has also began to fight against Afghan National Security Forces, and has claimed to have set up training camps in northern Afghanistan.

It is likely that some members of the Syrian branch, have become part of the Syrian transitional government's new 84th Division.

The group is named after Imam Bukhari, a 9th-century Islamic scholar who was from Bukhara in modern-day Uzbekistan.

== Leadership ==
The group was led by an individual known as Sheikh Salahuddin, before his assassination in Idlib Governorate.

== Activity ==
KIB has been operating in Syria and Afghanistan since at least 2015. In Syria, the group supported Al-Nusra Front and in Afghanistan the group supported the Taliban for their conquest to take over Afghanistan. The origins of the group lie in Islamic Movement of Uzbekistan.

== Organization ==
The Syrian and Afghan branches of KIB have sworn allegiance to Mullah Akhundzada of the Taliban in 2017. The group was also suspected to have supported the Taliban during the Taliban offensive in 2021.

=== Syrian transitional government ===
Following the fall of the Assad regime, the formation of the Syrian transitional government, and the integration of foreign jihadist fighters into the 84th Division, it is likely that members of Imam Bukhari Jamaat were also incorporated into the division, according to the FDD's Long War Journal.

== See also ==
- List of armed groups in the Syrian Civil War
- Foreign fighters in the Syrian and Iraqi Civil Wars
