= Zahid (Turkistan Islamic Party) =

Syrian rebel and general

Abdulaziz Dawud Hudaberdi
- ئابدۇلازىز داۋۇد ھۇدابەردى
- Born: Abdulaziz Dawud Hudaberdi; 7 March 1977 (age 49); Aral Town, Wensu County, Aksu Prefecture, People's Republic of China
- Military career
- Allegiance: Turkistan Islamic Party (until 2025); Syria (since 2025)
- Branch: Syrian Armed Forces
- Service years: Turkistan Islamic Party (2010–2025); Syrian Armed Forces (2025–present)
- Rank: Brigadier General
- Nicknames: Zahid; Zahid Qarim; Abu Mohammad; Abu Mohammad Zahid
- Units: Turkistan Islamic Party in Syria (until 2025); Syrian Army (since 2025)
- Commands: 84th Division; 133rd Division
- Conflicts: Battle of Aleppo (2024)
- Website: https://www.muhsinlar.net/

Abdulaziz Dawood Hudaberdi, (Note: Uyghur: ئابدۇلازىز داۋۇد ھۇدابەردى, romanized: ʾAbdulāzīz Dāwūd Hudaberdi) or Abu Muhammad Turkistani (born 7 March 1977), more commonly referred to by his nom de guerre Zahid, is a brigadier general in the Syrian Army, currently leading the 84th Division. He previously served as the emir of the Turkistan Islamic Party in Syria (TIP).

== Early life ==
Zahid is an ethnic Uyghur Muslim and was born into a farming family as Abdulaziz Dawood Hudaberdi in Aral Town, Aksu Prefecture, Xinjiang. After becoming a Hafiz in 1996 he joined the armed conflict within Xinjiang. He went back and forth into Chinese custody throughout the late 1990s and 2000s until he obtained a fake passport and left the country for Malaysia in 2010. He then travelled to Iran and then Afghanistan. Zahid joined the Turkistan Islamic Party and completed military training in Afghanistan from 2010 to 2012.

== Syrian civil war ==
As part of the TIP, Zahid was sent to Syria in 2012, where he quickly became a top commander among rebel forces. In 2013, Zahid served as a commander in the Siege of Base 46 and the battle of Khan Tuman. In 2015, he took part in the Jisr al Shughour offensive and the Siege of Abu al-Duhur. Additionally, he participated in the Battle of Aleppo.

The TIP took part in many other operations, mainly around the Latakia region and Jabal Zawiya. In 2021, Zahid graduated from a military institution in Idlib.

The TIP also played a prominent role in the battles of the 2024 Syrian opposition offensives.

== Post-Assad era ==
After the fall of the Assad regime on 8 December 2024, Zahid was seen alongside TIP fighters vowing to continue their fight against China for the East Turkestan independence movement. This was in line with videos released on their own website (Muhsinlar.net). In the closing days of 2024, the Syrian Armed Forces were restructured and Zahid was promoted to the rank of brigadier general. He now leads the newly established 133rd Division. During a conference in Idlib on January 5, 2025, Abu Omar (Kawsar), the previous leader of the Turkistan Islamic Party in Syria, appointed Zahid as the new Emir of the Syrian branch of the TIP. On 18 May 2025, the Syrian TIP was integrated into the 84th Division, a newly created unit made up largely foreign volunteers.
