= 2007 bomb plot in Germany =

Foiled terrorist attack in Medebach, Germany

- Location: Medebach, North Rhine-Westphalia, Germany
- Target: Ramstein Air Base, Frankfurt Airport and other public locations
- Attack type: Car bombing, mass murder (attempted)
- Weapons: Hydrogen peroxide and military-grade detonators
- Deaths: 0
- Injuries: 0
- Perpetrators: Fritz Gelowicz, Attila Selek, Daniel Schneider, Adem Yilmaz

In 2007, a bomb plot planned across various German states by the al-Qaeda-controlled Islamic Jihad Union (IJU) affiliated Sauerland terror cell (German: Sauerland-Gruppe, lit. 'Sauerland Group') was discovered following an extensive nine-month investigation involving more than 600 agents. The number of agents involved in a counterterrorism operation led by the federal police had never been the case before. At the same time, Danish police in Copenhagen were busy with explosives. A Pakistani and an Afghan man have been charged with preparing to carry out their attacks under al-Qaeda plans. Authorities said they were unaware of any direct links between the terrorists arrested in the two European countries. Three men were arrested on 4 September 2007 while leaving a rented cottage in the Oberschledorn district of Medebach, Germany where they had stored 700 kg (1,500 lb) of a hydrogen peroxide-based mixture and 26 military-grade detonators, and were attempting to build car bombs. A supporter was arrested in Turkey. All four had attended an IJU-training camp in the border region between Afghanistan and Pakistan in 2006. They were convicted in 2010 and given prison sentences of varying lengths; all have since been released.

== Perpetrators ==
Two of the perpetrators were German converts to Islam from Christianity, and two were German-Turks. In 2006, all four attended a paramilitary training camp run by the Islamic Jihad Union in Waziristan.

The perpetrators were primarily motivated by strong anti-Americanism fuelled by interaction with extremists inside Germany, Saudi Arabia and Pakistan, and their radicalization increased after the 2003 US-led invasion of Iraq.

=== Fritz Gelowicz ===
Fritz Gelowicz (born 1979) was considered the leader of the plot. He was born in Munich and moved to Ulm with his parents and brother at the age of 5. He was raised in an upper middle class family where his father was a solar heating salesman and his mother was a nurse. His parents separated when he was 15, and Gelowicz remained with his father. He converted to Islam between the ages of 15–18 while attending the Multikulturhaus in Neu-Ulm, and used the name Abdullah. The Multikulturhaus, with its radical sermons, was at the time one of the main Salafist centers in Germany; it was closed in 2005.

He enrolled to study engineering at Ulm University where he joined an extremist Islamist study circle, which regularly met at Café Istanbul. Members of the study group legitimized the killing of Jews, Christians and infidels. Gelowicz was also a member of extremist circles based at the Multikulturhaus in Neu-Ulm.

Gelowicz lost interest in his engineering studies and took an 18-month break from the University. During the break, he took Arabic language courses in Egypt and Syria as well as religious courses in Saudi Arabia. He also took part in the hajj to Mecca. According to U.S. authorities, Gelowicz trained at camp belonging to the Islamic Jihad Union in tribal areas of Pakistan.

He was married in January 2007, to a German-Turkish woman.

=== Others ===
- Daniel Schneider (born 1986), lived in Saarbrücken. He dropped out of the twelfth grade after only a few weeks. He converted to Islam at the age of 19, and spent time studying the Koran and Arabic in Egypt. Like Gelowicz, his parents were divorced when he was young and he had many Turkish friends, who seem to have introduced him to Islam. Schneider also spent 9 months as a conscript in the German army and trained in munitions. He met Gelowicz at the Islamic Jihad Union training camp in Pakistan.
- Adem Yilmaz (born 1979), was raised in Turkey. He came to Germany with his family in 1993. He has two younger sisters and a younger brother. His family lives in Germany's Hessian area. He holds both German and Turkish citizenships. He met Gelowicz and Selek in January 2005, when all three were making a pilgrimage to Mecca.
- Atilla Selek (born 1975) was a supporter of the group. He was born in Germany to Turkish parents and obtained German citizenship in 2005. Selek and Gelowicz met at the Multi-Kultur-Haus in Neu-Ulm. As Atilla had hidden criminal proceedings against him for breaches against gun regulation from the passport authorities during his application, those authorities removed his citizenship in 2011 on the grounds that it had been fraudulently obtained. This rendered him stateless.

Seven lesser figures were also being hunted. Only five are known by name. The other two have been identified by aliases. Four of the ten suspects (including Yilmaz) have been identified as Turkish.

== Investigation ==
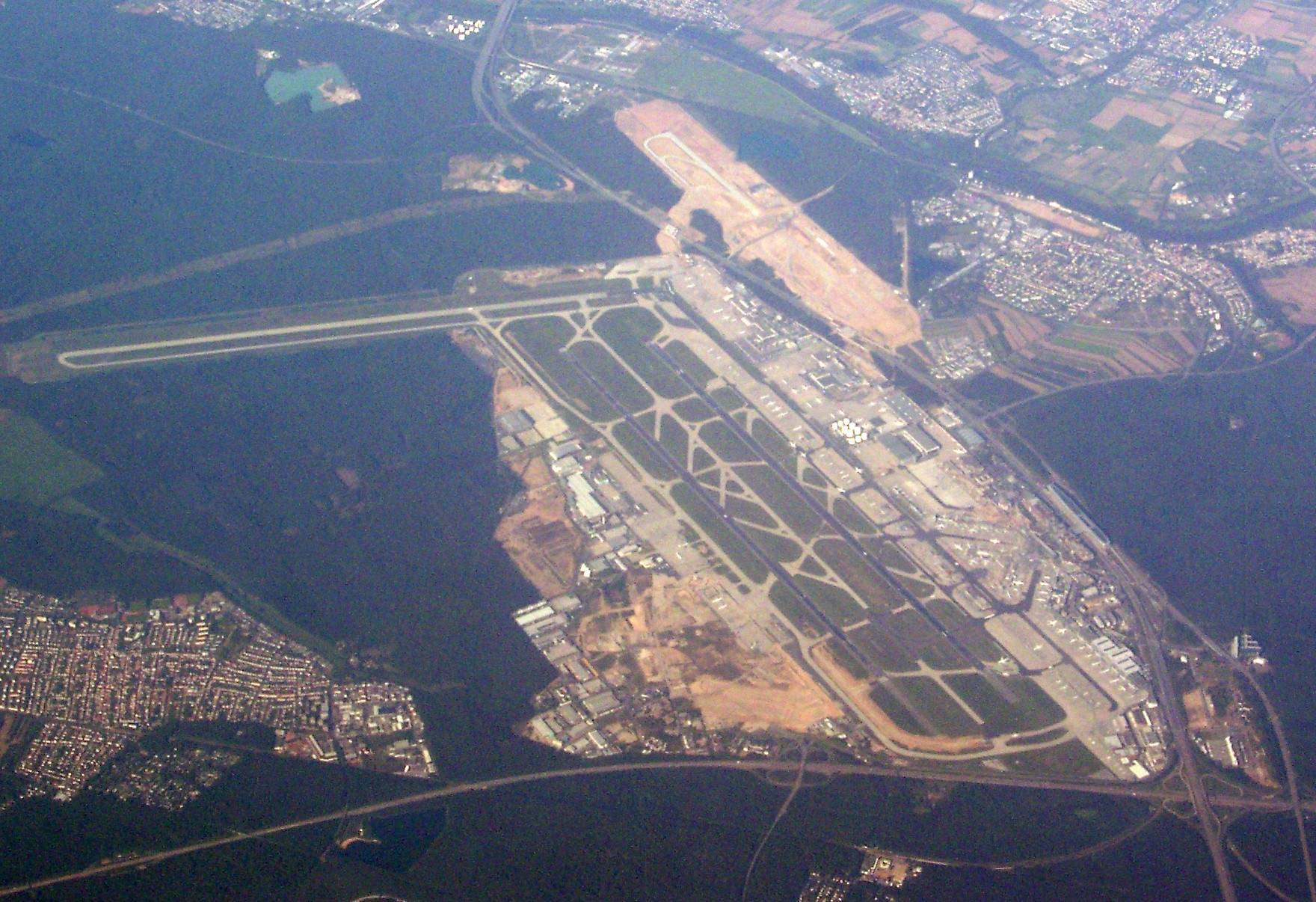
Frankfurt Airport

The suspects had been under observation since October 2006, when the NSA had intercepted communications between them and IJU and alerted German authorities. At the end of 2006, Fritz Gelowicz was spotted suspiciously observing a US Army base in Hanau. The suspects had rented a vacation house in the remote town of Oberschledorn, where they amassed 700 kg (1,500 lbs) of hydrogen peroxide, and military-grade detonators from Syria.

A 20 July conversation between two suspects mentioned targeting "a disco filled with American sluts," as well as Ramstein Air Base and Frankfurt Airport.

A phone call from northern Pakistan in late August is purported to have set a 15 September deadline for the group's attacks. The group was aware that they were being watched by police, one member even slashing an unmarked police car's tires while stopped at an intersection.

A routine traffic stop by police not involved in the investigation led to the officers mentioning that the drivers were on a federal watchlist, a comment that the suspects overheard (as was recorded by covert listening devices installed by German authorities in their rented car). This led to an unscheduled raid on their cottage on 4 September 2007. The men were preparing to move the chemicals by van when they were arrested outside the home. There was a minor scuffle and one of the men shot a German police officer in the hand before being subdued.

=== Bombing materials ===
The solution containing 35% hydrogen peroxide had been purchased legally. Authorities who were observing the group surreptitiously replaced it with a harmless 3% solution at the end of July 2007. The Pakistani terror camps had reportedly trained their members to make bombs using peroxide as it was easy to procure, and unlikely to rouse suspicion. The hydrogen peroxide was to be concentrated by being heated, and then mixed with flour. It was found later that many of the 26 military detonators the group had purchased would not have worked.

Three used vans had also been purchased in France, and brought into Germany, possibly to be the carriers for the bombs.

== Aftermath ==
U.S. President George W. Bush, after being briefed on the arrests, expressed his appreciation to the German authorities, saying that serious potential terrorist attacks had been prevented. The authorities did not find a direct link between the cases in Germany and Denmark, but in both cases they also found material for bomb-making in addition to the suspected links with al-Qaeda. Both German and Danish suspects used the Internet to try to communicate with their Pakistani network.

Tougher terror legislation was proposed by German Justice Minister Brigitte Zypries. The new laws would make it illegal to train and/or obtain substances for an attack. The proposed penalty would be up to ten years in prison.

G., S., Y., and S. went on trial in Germany on 22 April 2009. The suspects confessed. They were sentenced in March 2010.

=== Perpetrators and sentencing ===
The authorities did not find a direct link between the cases in Germany and Denmark, but in both cases they also found material for bomb-making in addition to the suspected links with al-Qaeda. Both German and Danish suspects used the Internet to try to communicate with their Pakistani network.

The perpetrators were primarily motivated by strong anti-Americanism fuelled by interaction with extremists inside Germany, Saudi Arabia and Pakistan and their radicalization increased after the 2003 invasion of Iraq.

- Fritz Gelowicz received a 12-year prison sentence for membership in a terrorist organisation abroad, conspiracy to murder, conspiracy to cause an explosion, conspiracy to blackmail constitutional organs, and preparation to cause an explosion offence. He was granted early release in August 2016 after having been in jail for nine years.
- Adem Yilmaz received an 11-year prison sentence for membership in a terrorist organisation abroad, conspiracy to murder, conspiracy to cause an explosion, conspiracy to blackmail constitutional organs, and preparation to cause an explosive offence. He received a shorter sentence since the members of the group had offered confessions on his initiative.
- Atilla Selek. received a 5-year prison sentence for attempted murder and resisting enforcement officers (for the events during his arrest), as well as for membership in a terrorist organisation abroad, conspiracy to murder, conspiracy to cause an explosion, conspiracy to blackmail constitutional organs, and preparation to cause an explosive offence. He was released in 2011 after having served two-thirds of his sentence. His citizenship was revoked.
- Daniel Schneider received a 5-year prison sentence for supporting a terrorist organisation abroad and preparation to cause an explosive offence. He was released in July 2011.
