= 84th Division (Syria) =

- Active: July 2025 - present
- Country: Syria
- Branch: Syrian Army
- Type: Army division
- Role: Foreign fighter unit
- Area of responsibility: Latakia Governorate and Lebanon–Syria border
- Nickname: Foreign fighter division

Commanders
- Current commander: Brigadier General Abu Muhammad Turkistani

The 84th Division of the Syrian Army, established under the Syrian transitional government, is responsible for Syria's mountainous northwest in particular the Latakia Governorate, and northern border with Lebanon. It is commonly referred to as the “foreign fighter division,” as its ranks are primarily composed of non-Syrian Salafi-jihadists.

== History ==
=== Background ===
Foreign fighters played a significant role throughout the Syrian Civil War, particularly within Salafi-jihadist opposition factions, which by the end of the conflict were largely led by Hay’at Tahrir al-Sham (HTS). The integration of these fighters following the fall of the Assad regime was regarded as one of the most contentious issues complicating rapprochement between Syria's new government and Western states as well as integration efforts concerning the Syrian Democratic Forces (SDF). Already in December 2024, transitional government leader Ahmed al-Sharaa (the former head of HTS) promoted six foreign fighters to the rank of brigadier general. As Al-Sharaa began to reorganize the Syrian army, in the so-called “Syrian Revolution Victory Conference” in January 2025, various foreign jihadist groups like the Jaish al-Muhajireen wal-Ansar, consisting of both Arabic-speaking fighters and fighters from the North Caucasus, and the Turkistan Islamic Party (TIP), a Uyghur jihadist faction aligned with Al-Qaeda and active in both Syria and Afghanistan, began to be integrated into the defense apparatus of Syria. On 18 May 2025, Syria's Defense Ministry formally integrated TIP into the ranks of Sharaa's newly established army. Until early May 2025, the United States had reportedly urged the new leadership to exclude foreign fighters from its security institutions. However, by June 2025, shortly after Donald Trump's Middle East tour, Washington had given its approval for the formation of an official military unit composed of foreign Salafi-jihadists, intended to “halt the trend of defections to ISIS [...] and to bring these elements under the army's control.”

=== Formation ===
Following U.S. approval, the 84th Division was formally established, consisting primarily of Salafi-jihadist fighters from Jordan, the West Bank and Gaza, Kyrgyzstan, Uzbekistan, Iranian Kurdistan,Tajikistan, Turkey, Albania, Chechnya, Dagestan and other regions. A significant portion of its personnel is affiliated with the TIP, Liwa al-Muhajireen wal-Ansar, Katibat Tawhid wal-Jihad, and Ajnad al-Kavkaz, while a smaller number of Syrians also serve within the division. It is likely that other foreign Salafi Jihadist groups such as the Katibat Imam al Bukhari, the Mujahidin Ghuroba Division, and the Islamic Jihad Union, will be integrated as well. Many of these groups have direct ties to Al Qaeda.

== Structure ==
The 84th Division is classified as a special forces unit. It is expected to number about 30,000 combatants, organized into six brigades: an armored brigade, an artillery brigade, an assault (raid) brigade, an urban-warfare brigade, and two mountain-warfare brigades.

The Syrian presidency has assumed direct oversight over the structure of the division. The unit is under the joint command of Abdul Aziz Dawood Khodabardi (also known as Abu Muhammad Turkistani and Abu Muhammad Zahid), Omar Muhammad Jiftchi (known as Mukhtar al-Turki), and Dhul-Qarnayn Zannur al-Basr Abdul Hamid (also known as Abdullah al-Daghestani), former leader of Jaish al-Muhajireen wal-Ansar.

== Criticism ==
The decision to integrate foreign fighters with extremist ideologies into the framework of the New Syrian Army raised considerable doubts about Al-Sharaa's intentions and the credibility of his commitment to moderation.

Especially China was critical of the division's formation, as the Uyghur fighters from China and Central Asia were previously part of the TIP, which is designated as a terrorist organisation by Beijing. A Chinese foreign ministry spokesperson said: "China hopes that Syria will oppose all forms of terrorism and extremist forces in response to the concerns of the international community."

Dr Joshua Landis, a director of the Center for Middle East Studies at the University of Oklahoma, explained that the integration of foreign fighters into the regular Syrian army came with an "emotional toll" saying "the foreign fighter problem has effectively been made a Syrian problem, which makes many Syrians fearful.”

Mustafa Hasan, a researcher with the International Centre for Counter-Terrorism, says the integration of foreign fighters "prioritises the short-term interests of political or military actors while sidelining the long-term implications for national stability and institutional coherence.”

Syria's ethnic minorities, like the Alawites, Kurds, Shiites, Christians, and Druze, are deeply hostile to the presence of jihadist foreign fighters. In particular the Alawite minority, concentrated in the coastal regions where many of the foreign fighters have been deployed, has viewed this development with deep concern, in light of the 2025 massacres of Syrian Alawites.
