= Mauritanian =

Mauritanian may refer to:

- Something of, from, or related to Mauritania, a country in northwest Africa
- A person from Mauritania, or of Mauritanian descent. For information about the Mauritanian people, see Demographics of Mauritania.
- Note that there is no language called "Mauritanian". For Mauritania's official language, see Arabic.
- For the history of Mauritania, see History of Mauritania
- The Mauritanian, 2021 film directed by Kevin Macdonald
