= Abu Omar al-Turkistani =

Uyghur al-Qaeda militant (died 2017)

- Abu Omar al-Turkistani in Afghanistan
- Born: Xinjiang, China
- Died: 1 January 2017; Sarmada, Syria
- Military career
- Allegiance: al-Qaeda (c. 2000–17): Islamic Jihad Union (IJU) (2011–15); Al-Nusra Front; Ansar Jihad (2015–17); Turkistan Islamic Party in Syria (2015–17)
- Service years: c. 2000–2017
- Rank: IJU commander (until 2015); Leader of Ansar Jihad; Leading TIP commander in Syria
- Conflicts: War on terror: War in Afghanistan (2001–2021); Battle of Tora Bora; Syrian Civil War; Battle of Aleppo (2012–16); Aleppo offensive (October–November 2016); 2015–16 Latakia offensive; American-led intervention in Syria †

Abu Omar al-Turkistani (Note: This was his kunya and nom de guerre in Syria, which can be translated to "Father of Omar, the Turkestani"; his real name is unknown.) (Arabic: أبو عمر التركستاني; Chinese: 阿布·奧瑪爾·突厥斯坦尼; 1 January 2017) was a high-ranking commander for several al-Qaeda-affiliated groups, such as the Islamic Jihad Union (IJU), the Al-Nusra Front and the Turkistan Islamic Party in Syria (TIP). Active as a militant since at least 2001, al-Turkistani fought in both the War in Afghanistan and the Syrian Civil War. By late 2016, he was considered to be "one of top ten leading 'jihadists' in Syria" and one of the "four most prominent leaders" of TIP. Shortly before his death, al-Turkistani helped to facilitate the merger of many Islamist rebel groups into Tahrir al-Sham. He was eventually killed by an American drone strike on 1 January 2017.

== Biography ==
Most of Abu Omar al-Turkistani's early life, including his birth name, is unknown. An ethnic Uyghur, he originally lived in Xinjiang, China, but migrated to Afghanistan and joined al-Qaeda sometime before the US invasion in 2001. When United States-led forces attacked Osama bin Laden's stronghold at Tora Bora, al-Turkistani was among the local defenders; after the battle's end, he fled to Pakistan, where he was arrested and jailed by the Inter-Services Intelligence until around 2011.

After being released, al-Turkistani returned to Afghanistan and joined the Islamic Jihad Union (IJU), an al-Qaeda-affiliated group, in order to fight the Afghan government and ISAF. Though IJU is primarily composed of Uzbeks, it also includes members of many other ethnicities. Because of that, al-Turkistani quickly rose in prominence within the rebel group, as he was fluent in several languages, among them English, Pashto, and Russian. He eventually became one of IJU's commanders, fighting with the unit until he left Afghanistan for Syria sometime in 2015.

In Syria, al-Turkistani became the commander of Ansar Jihad, a Jihadist rebel group that consists of fighters from Central Asia and Turkey; according to the Long War Journal, Ansar Jihad is probably a sub-unit of al-Qaeda's Syrian branch, the al-Nusra Front. Al-Turkistani led Ansar Jihad into battles in Latakia Governorate and Aleppo, most prominently during the Aleppo offensive of October and November 2016. Besides these activities, he appears to have simultaneously become the leading commander of the Turkistan Islamic Party in Syria (TIP). A Uyghur Islamic extremist separatist organization, TIP's primary enemy is China, though the group has become especially prominent and powerful in Syria.

In late 2016, al-Turkistani took part in talks between the al-Nusra Front (by then renamed to "Jabhat Fateh al-Sham") and various other rebel groups about a merger into a major coalition. In these talks, he reportedly played a leading role and was seen as someone who could perhaps assume a leadership position in the proposed union. On 1 January 2017, however, he and two other al-Qaeda veteran commanders, Abu Khattab al Qahtani and Abu Mu’tasim al-Dairi, were killed by a US drone strike. Their convoy was struck after leaving the town of Sarmada in Idlib Governorate. Al-Turkistani was subsequently declared a martyr by Jihadi online outlets, with Jabhat Fateh al-Sham condemning the attack as sign that the United States had "chosen Bashar al-Assad over the Syrian people." Meanwhile, Ansar Jihad released a laudatory biography of their killed leader. On the other side, al-Turkistani's death also received considerable attention in China, where many netizens celebrated his killing and even called it a "superb New Year's gift". In contrast, Chinese Foreign Ministry spokesman Geng Shuang declined to comment on the air strike.
