= Multikulturhaus =

The Multikulturhaus in Neu-Ulm was a cultural centre run by the Multikulturhaus e. V., a registered association. On 28 December 2005 it was shut down by the Bavarian Ministry of the Interior. The land, the building and monetary funds were confiscated by authorities.

The institution was suspected of Islamist leanings and inciting murder of Jews and Christians and glorifying martyrdom. Islamic preachers have incited to jihad (holy war). By people formerly in leading positions at the centre, authorities found manuals for manufacturing explosives.

== Closure ==
According to Günther Beckstein, then interior minister of Bavaria: "organisations which in an aggressive manner counteracts the constitutional order openly encourage violence towards that end are not tolerated here".

After closing the activities of the Multikulturhaus, it was planned to repurpose the building into a shelter for the homeless.

== Aftermath ==
In 2016, the building was bought by the municipality of Neu-Ulm from the State of Bavaria and was intended to become a centre for asylum seekers.

Neu-Ulm and neighbouring Ulm were thereafter for years counted as areas with high activity by radical Islamists.

== Notable people ==
- Reda Seyam
- Khaled el Masri

== See also ==
- Multiculturalism in Germany
