= Najmiddin Jalolov =

Personal details
- Born: 1 April 1972 Xartum, Andijan Region, Uzbek SSR, Soviet Union
- Died: September 14, 2009 (aged 37) Pakistan

Najmiddin Jalolov (Russian: Наджмуддин Камолитдинович Джалолов Nadzhmuddin Kamolitdinovich Dzhalolov, a.k.a. Abu Yahya Muhammad Fatih; April 1, 1972 – September 14, 2009) was the leader of the Jama'at al-Jihad al-Islami, a militant organization affiliated with Al Qaeda that operates in the larger Central Asian region. The group was also suspected of planning attacks in Russia and Western Europe.

== Early life ==
Jalolov was born in the town of Xartum, Andijan Region, Uzbek SSR, today Uzbekistan. He trained in mines and explosives at Al-Qaida camps and participated in operations in Afghanistan and Pakistan on the Taliban side.

== Terror activities ==
Jalolov was a former member of the Islamic Movement of Uzbekistan (IMU), another organization affiliated with Al Qaeda. Uzbek courts found Jalolov guilty of terrorism in absentia in 2000. He left IMU around 2000 and took part in Islamic Jihad Union. He left the IMU due to Tohir Yoʻldosh abandoning IMU activities in Uzbekistan and being preoccupied with the "global jihad" of al-Qaeda.

He was considered a potential ringleader in a September 2007 plot to attack several venues in Germany, according to the United States Treasury Department. In 2006, he directed the casing of terrorist targets, particularly hotels catering to Western visitors, in Central Asia.

Jalolov was tied to Taliban leader Mohammed Omar, Uyghur militant Abu Mohammad, and Al Qaeda leader Osama bin Laden. In 2004, he ordered the attacks on the US Embassy and the Israeli Embassy in Tashkent.

== Death ==
Jalolov was killed in a U.S. Predator drone strike in Pakistan on 14 September 2009.
