= Mark John Taylor =

New Zealander fighting for ISIL

Mark John Taylor, also known as Mohammad Daniel and Abu Abdul Rahman, is a New Zealand citizen who traveled to Syria in 2014 to join the Islamic State. In early March 2019, it was reported by the Australian Broadcasting Corporation that he had been captured and imprisoned by Kurdish forces. Taylor has since sought to return to New Zealand, triggering considerable media coverage and political commentary.

== Background ==
Mark Taylor grew up in Hamilton in the North Island. According to a relative, he suffered brain damage following a "major fit with teething." He attended a special needs school but was brought up as a normal child. During the 1990s, Taylor served in the New Zealand Army. He married a Christian woman and became a "born again" Christian.

In 2003, Taylor lived in Lakemba, a suburb of Sydney in Australia. Taylor was actively engaged with the Muslim community there, claiming that he was unlike most Muslim converts in that he had converted to Islam through the medium of the internet.

In 2009, Taylor traveled to Yemen and Pakistan, drawing the attention of New Zealand authorities. Following his arrest by Pakistani authorities while trying to reach an Al-Qaeda and Taliban stronghold on the Afghanistan–Pakistan border, the New Zealand Government imposed travel restrictions on him. According to a Muslim elder from the Hamilton Muslim community, Taylor struggled with mental health issues and was influenced by the sermons of radical American preacher Anwar Al-Awlaki.

In 2010, Taylor was deported from Australia after his visa was cancelled when he was classified as a "security risk" by the Australian Security Intelligence Organisation. Taylor had lived between Australia and New Zealand for 25 years. In 2011, Taylor was reissued with a New Zealand passport. In May 2012, he migrated to Indonesia where he worked as an English-language teacher for two years. During his time in Indonesia, Taylor reportedly married an Indonesian woman who had children from a previous marriage. She reportedly expressed unease about his unstable character and addiction to violent video games.

== Joining the Islamic State ==
In June 2014, Taylor entered Syria through the Turkish border before joining the Islamic State. In late 2014, Taylor deleted 45 Twitter posts after they reportedly exposed an Islamic State presence in the Kafar Roma area in Syria. In late April 2015, Taylor appeared in an Islamic State YouTube propaganda video calling for terror attacks in New Zealand and Australia on Anzac Day, which falls on 25 April. In response, the United States Government designated Taylor as a "Specially Designated Global Terrorist."

Taylor has claimed that he was not a fighter during the five years that he spent with the Islamic State and that he only served as a border guard along the border between the Islamic State and Syria. Taylor has also alleged that he was imprisoned three times by the Islamic State secret police unit. In October 2015, Taylor mistakenly exposed the location of Islamic State fighters on Twitter when he forgot to turn off a tracking function on his phone, earning the nickname the "bumbling Jihadist". He claims that he was imprisoned for 50 days as punishment for that incident. Taylor has also claimed that he witnessed several beheadings and executions during his time with the Islamic State.

In May 2017, Taylor surfaced on the Islamic marriage website "islamicmarriage.com" seeking a wife willing to join him in the Islamic State's capital of Raqqa. During his time in Syria, Taylor was reportedly married to two women. His first wife was a Syrian woman from Deir ez-Zor named Umm Mohammed who wanted him to leave for Turkey. Taylor subsequently married a younger woman who was sympathetic to the Islamic State. However, Taylor divorced her after she wanted to move to another area in order to be closer to her family.

== Capture and intended return ==
In December 2018, Taylor fled Islamic State forces and surrendered to Kurdish forces in Syria. Taylor claims that he was motivated by the lack of food and money. On 4 March 2019, Taylor was interviewed while in custody by Australian Broadcasting Corporation Middle East correspondent Adam Harvey and Suzanne Dredge. During the interview, Taylor claimed that he had not taken part in hostilities but had merely served as a border guard for the Islamic State. Taylor also claimed to have witnessed several beheadings and executions. In addition, Taylor expressed regret that he was too poor to buy a female Yazidi slave. Taylor has expressed a desire to return to New Zealand but has acknowledged that he would not be surprised if his country did not take him back.

During an interview with journalist Campell MacDiarmid of the Abu Dhabi-based newspaper The National, Taylor claimed that he had been in contact with New Zealand intelligence officers who had encouraged him to leave the Islamic State and had offered him assistance to return home. Taylor has also expressed an interest in setting up a medical marijuana company after returning to New Zealand. However, Andrew Little, the Minister in charge of New Zealand's intelligence services, has asserted that no New Zealand government representatives have been in contact with Taylor since his capture.

=== Political responses ===
In response to media coverage of Taylor's capture, Prime Minister Jacinda Ardern of the Labour Party confirmed that New Zealand would not be stripping Taylor of his citizenship but that he would have to make his own travel arrangements since New Zealand lacked a diplomatic presence in Syria. She also warned that he would face an investigation in New Zealand due to his association with terrorist organisations. Similar sentiments were echoed by Justice Minister Andrew Little while the Green Party's Justice spokesperson Golriz Ghahraman has stated Taylor should cooperate with Kurdish forces and the UN to extradite to NZ.

Meanwhile, Foreign Minister Winston Peters has described Taylor as a traitor to his country and Western civilization, opining that he had forfeited his right to return to New Zealand by joining the Islamic State. National Party leader and Leader of the Opposition Simon Bridges has stated that New Zealand was in no hurry to take Taylor back and that he should face prison for his involvement with a terrorist group. National Party Deputy Leader Paula Bennett and New Zealand First Member of Parliament and government minister Shane Jones have described Taylor as a disgrace to New Zealand and said he should face justice.

=== Media and public responses ===
Media coverage of Taylor's capture has drawn considerable media coverage and public commentary. Several New Zealand academics including University of Waikato law professor Alexander Gillespie, University of Otago political scientist Robert Patman, and University of Auckland political scientist Chris Wilson have welcomed the New Zealand Government's decision not to strip Taylor of his citizenship and called for Taylor to face trial in New Zealand. New Zealand radio and television broadcaster Mike Hosking has criticised Ardern's decision not to strip Taylor of his citizenship.

By contrast, broadcaster Andrew Dickens has rejected calls to strip Taylor of his citizenship, describing it as a policy characteristic of totalitarian regimes. Similar sentiments were echoed by the editorial of The Press newspaper. International security analyst Paul Buchanan has argued that Taylor is a prisoner of war who could provide valuable intelligence to the New Zealand authorities. Buchanan has also opined that Taylor could also face war crime charges if he is linked to war crimes such as complicity in slavery and executions.
