= Turkistan Islamic Party in Syria =

Uyghur Sunni liberation militant group

Turkistan Islamic Party الحزب الإسلامي التركستاني
- Flag of the Turkistan Islamic Party in Syria Flag of the Turkistan Islamic Party
- Leaders: Abu Omar al-Turkistani † (2012–2017); Abu Rida al-Turkistani † (2017–2017); Ibrahim Mansour (2017–???); Abu Omar (Kawsar) (???-2025); Zahid (???-2025)
- Dates active: 2015–2025
- Headquarters: Jisr al-Shughur, Idlib Governorate, Syria
- Active regions: Idlib Governorate, Idlib Governorate, and Aleppo Governorate, Syria
- Ideology: Sunni Islamism; Salafi jihadism Wahhabism; Islamic fundamentalism Turkistani nationalism Uyghur nationalism Separatism; Anti-Russian sentiment Anti-Chinese sentiment Anti-Alawite sentiment
- Status: Dissolved, merged into the Syrian Armed Forces
- Size: ~4,000
- Part of: Turkistan Islamic Party; Battle of Victory (23 April–June 2015); Army of Conquest (2015–2017)
- Wars: the Syrian Civil War
- Website: https://www.muhsinlar.net/

The Turkistan Islamic Party in Syria (TIP) (Note: Arabic: الحزب الإسلامي التركستاني في سوريا, romanized: Ḥizb al-Islāmī al-Turkistānī Fī Sūriyyā Turkish: Türkistan İslam Partisi, Chinese: 突厥斯坦伊斯兰党) was the Syrian branch of the Turkistan Islamic Party, an armed Jihadist Uyghur group with a presence in the Syrian Civil War. While the TIP has been active in Syria, the organization's core leadership was based in Afghanistan while the organization itself was founded in Pakistan, with a small presence in its home territory of China.

At the Syrian Revolution Victory Conference, which was held on 29 January 2025, most factions of the armed opposition, including the Turkistan Islamic Party in Syria, announced their dissolution and were incorporated into the newly formed Ministry of Defense. The Syrian branch of TIP was officially integrated into the Syrian Army's 84th Division, a unit mostly recruited from non-Syrians.

== History ==
Flag of the Turkistan Islamic Party in Syria used in 2017. Following the fall of the Assad regime the group has returned to using their blue flag

The TIP (Chinese called ETIM) sent the "Turkistan Brigade" (Katibat Turkistani), also known as the Turkistan Islamic Party in Syria to take part in the Syrian civil war, most noticeably in the 2015 Jisr Al-Shughur offensive. Long War Journal reported in 2015 that Turkistan Islamic Party, alongside other foreign fighters like Chechen and Uzbek militants, had ties to 'The Network' (Al-Qaeda).

In 2014, Ibrahim Mansour, a Turkistan Islamic Party official, told Anadolu Agency that "Muslim Uyghur families in China would rather live under the flames of war in Syria than endure oppression and persecution by the Chinese authorities in East Turkestan". Mansour stated at the time that they fought alongside the Free Syrian Army and had no ties to Al-Qaeda, emphasizing that "our fight is against the Bashar Al-Assad regime".

In Jisr Al-Shughur a Church's cross had a TIP flag placed on top of it after the end of the battle as a victory mark. The Uzbek group Katibat Al-Tawhid wal-Jihad (Tavhid va Jihod katibasi) released a video featuring themselves and the Uyghur Turkistan Islamic Party attacking and desecrating Christian Churches in Jisr Al-Shughur. Jabhat al Nusra and Turkistan Islamic Party fighters were accused of displacing Christian residents of rural Jisr Al-Shughour, and reportedly killed a Syrian Christian man along with his wife, accusing them of being Syrian government agents. The Saudi news agency Al-Arabiya said that the area was Alawite.

Turkistan Islamic Party exploited the Turkish Postal Service and Turkish banks to solicit donations via the organization "Türkistan İslam Derneği" through the website "Doğu Türkistan Bülteni".

In 2017, the Turkistan Islamic Party held a military parade in Syria, displaying dozens of military vehicles and T-62 tanks, threatening China.

=== Fall of the Assad regime ===
The group participated in the 2024 Syrian opposition offensives which culminated in the fall of the Assad regime. Shortly afterwards, the group uploaded a video stating:

Now here in Syria, in all the cities here, we fight for Allah, and we will continue to do this in our Urumchi, Aqsu and Kashgar in the future. We will chase the Chinese infidels away

At the same time the group uploaded a video with their leader, Abu Muhammed alongside their battalion, using the blue flag of the Turkistan Islamic Party, instead of the black flag the group had previously been using. TIP fighters entered the strategic port cities of Latakia and Tartus on 10 and 11 December. The TIP promised that now that the Syrian civil war was over, that they would focus on fighting the Chinese government.

At the event on 29 January 2025 declaring the victory of the Syrian revolution, most factions of the armed opposition including the Turkistan Islamic Party in Syria announced their dissolution and were incorporated into the newly formed Ministry of Defense. Fighters from the Turkistan Islamic Party participated in the 2025 massacres of Syrian Alawites. According to Reuters, TIP carried out many of the attacks.

In early 2025, the United States government demanded that TIP and other foreign militias be removed from Syria, but the Syrian transitional government stalled and argued that foreign fighters had to be treated with respect due to their role in overthrowing Assad. Finally, US President's envoy gave its blessing to a plan by Syria's new leadership to incorporate thousands of foreign jihadist former rebel fighters into the Syrian army. On 18 May, the Syrian branch of TIP was integrated into Syrian Army's 84th Division, a newly created unit which was largely recruited from foreign volunteers. The TIP ex-commander Abdulaziz Dawud Hudaberdi (alias "Zahid") was promoted to brigadier general in the Syrian military.

== Organization ==
=== Route into Syria ===
According to the Jamestown Foundation, Turkish connections were used by Uyghur fighters to go into Syria and the humanitarian Uyghur East Turkistan Education and Solidarity Association (ETESA) which was located in Turkey sent Uyghurs into Syria, endorsed the killing of the pro-China Imam Juma Tayir, applauded attacks in China, and posted on its website content from the TIP.

=== Child soldiers ===
Camps training children for Jihad were being run by the Turkistan Islamic Party in Syria. Uyghur child soldiers being instructed in Sharia and training with guns were depicted in a video released by TIP.

=== Leadership ===
Top commander Abu Omar Al-Turkistani, who also served as the group's first overall leader, was killed in an American drone strike in Sarmada, Idlib on 1 January 2017. His replacement leader, Abu Rida Al-Turkistani, was then killed in a series of Russian airstrikes on his home near the town of Ariha on 12 January 2017, leaving his entire family dead as well. Ibrahim Mansour succeeded Abu Rida Al-Turkistani as the third leader of TIP since then.

== See also ==
- Jihadism
- Terrorism in China
- Xinjiang raid
- Turkistan Islamic Party
