= List of Second Chechen War assassinations =

Assassinations during the Second Chechen War

There were a number of assassinations connected to the Second Chechen War, conducted by the Russian Federation secret agents and the Chechen separatist and North Caucasian rebels, as well as by an unknown assailants.

== Assassinations in Chechnya ==
- May 2000 - Moderate Chechen separatist politician Ruslan Alikhadzhyev abducted and killed by the Russian forces in Shali.
- May 31, 2000 - Sergei Zveryev, Russia's second highest official in Chechnya, was killed by a remote controlled bomb in Grozny. The city Mayor Supyan Makhchayev, who was with Zveryev, was injured in the bombing, and his assistant was also killed.
- May 4, 2001 - A prominent Chechnya's religious leader, Mullah Nasruddin Matuyev, was shot dead by two unidentified gunmen when he was returning home from the mosque in the village of Novye Atagi.
- April 18, 2001 - Car of the Russian human rights activist Victor Popkov was attacked in Chechnya by unknown assailants. On June 2 he died of his wounds in a hospital in Krasnogorsk near Moscow.
- June 6, 2001 - Local administration head of the village Gekhi-Chu Lema Idrisov was killed in the Urus-Martan district; 17 administration officials and six heads of village administrations have been killed in Chechnya in the eight months since January 2001. On June 10 Lukman Madalov, head of the administration of village Valerik in the Achkhoy-Martan district, was shot dead in his house.
- September 10, 2001 - Lecha Kadyrov, a nephew the head of Chechnya's pro-Moscow administration Akhmad Kadyrov, and three of his companions were shot dead near Kurchaloy, east Chechnya, after attackers fired at their car.
- October 17, 2001 - A surface-to-air missile shot down a VIP Mi-8 helicopter over the Chechen capital Grozny, killing all aboard. The helicopter was carrying Major-General Anatoli Pozdnyakov, member of the General Staff of the Russian Armed Forces, Major-General Pavel Varfolomeyev, deputy director of staff of the Defence Ministry of Russia, eight colonels, and three crewmembers. According to Anna Politkovskaya, who interviewed General Pozdnyakov an hour before his death, the attack was actually work of the corrupt elements in the Russian military in Chechnya.
- November 29, 2001 - A young Chechen woman, Elza Gazuyeva, carried out an assassination attempt on the Urus-Martan military district commandant, identified only as General Geydar Gadzhiev, blowing herself up with a hand grenade near a group of Russian soldiers. Gazuyeva had lost a husband, two brothers, and a cousin in the war. Gadzhiev, who was accused of atrocities against civilians by locals, reportedly had personally summoned Elza to witness her husband's and brother's torture and execution. He and several other soldiers later died of their wounds.
- January 27, 2002 - A Russian Interior Ministry Mi-8 was shot down in Nadterechny District, killing eleven people including crew. Among those killed in the crash were Russian deputy interior minister Lieutenant-General Mikhail Rudchenko, responsible for security in the Southern Federal District, and deputy commander of the Internal Troops Major-General Nikolai Goridov, as well as several other high-ranking officers including colonels Oriyenko, Stepanenko, and Trafimov. The chopper's downing coincided with the five-year anniversary of the election of separatist leader Aslan Maskhadov as President of Chechnya.
- March 19, 2002 - One of the leaders of the radical wing of the Chechen resistance and the influential Jordanian volunteer, Amir Khattab, was killed by a poisoned letter in an operation by the Federal Security Service (FSB). The messenger, a Dagestani double agent known as Ibragim, was reportedly tracked down and killed a month later in Azerbaijan on Shamil Basayev's orders.
- September 10, 2002 - Administrative head of the Nadterechny District, Akhmad Zavgayev (brother of Doku Zavgayev), was killed as unknown gunmen opened fire his car in his home village of Beno-Yurt, several kilometers away from Chechnya's border with North Ossetia.
- November 16, 2002 - Lieutenant-General Igor Shifrin, head of the Glavspetzstroi (Main Directorate of Special Construction of the Ministry of Defense), was killed in ambush in Grozny when his and another vehicle came under intense fire from automatic weapons. During the manhunt for the killers of the general, two policemen were killed and two more were wounded; an unspecified number of Chechen gunmen were reported killed in the firefight.
- March 5, 2003 - The Chechen OMON special-purpose police commander, Dzhabrail Yamadayev, was killed in his own house in the village of Dyshne-Vedeno by a bomb planted under a couch that he slept on; the explosive device was so powerful that the house was almost completely destroyed. Dzhabrail Yamadayev was one of Chechnya's best-known and influential figures. During the First Chechen War the Yamadayev brothers fought against the federal troops and enjoyed great influence as field commanders, but changed sides in 1999.
- May 9, 2004 - Pro-Russian president Akhmad Kadyrov was assassinated in a blast of the substantial bomb inside of a Grozny's Uvays Akhtayev Stadium during the celebration of Russian Victory Day. A number of other top government and military officials were killed or injured in the attack including: The chairman of the State Council of Chechnya, Hussein Isayev, the military commander in the North Caucasus, Colonel-General Valery Baranov, the Chechen interior minister, Alu Alkhanov and the military commandant of Chechnya, Major-General Grigory Fomenko. In all, 13 persons in the VIP stand were killed, and 53 were wounded. Kadyrov had survived at least three preceding bomb attacks: one on his Grozny headquarters in 2002, one by a pair of female suicide bombers at a religious festival in Iliskhan-Yurt on May 14, 2003, and another by a young shahidka, Mariam Tashukhadzhiyeva, in Grozny few weeks later. His successor, acting President Sergey Abramov, was targeted by yet another bombing in July 2004 which he survived.
- February 7, 2007 - Mairbek Murdagaliyev, deputy head of the Vedensky District administration, killed in a blast of an explosive device planted at the door of his house.

== Assassinations in North Caucasus ==
- February 2, 2005 - Major-General Magomed Omarov, Dagestan's deputy interior minister, was assassinated in capital Makhachkala, when rebels ambushed his motorcade and killed him in the shoot-out. Omarov had coordinated all major anti-insurgent operations in the republic and had narrowly escaped another assassination attempt in 2003.
- March 22, 2006 - A group of assailants fatally shot Ruslan Aliyev, the chief administrator of mountainous Botlikhsky District of Dagestan, during a fierce gunbattle; Aliyev's vehicle was struck by gunfire in the center of Makhachkala] on the city's most guarded street. On March 10, Magomed Magomedov, deputy head of the republican Criminal Investigation Department, was killed in Makhachkala by a bomb planted underneath his car. Two days later, March 12, a senior officer from the Organized Crime Department was shot dead in Makhachkala, and another was killed on March 21 in the town of Buinaksk.
- May 17, 2006 - An explosion in Ingushetia killed seven people including among them the republic's police chief and acting first deputy interior minister Dzhabrail Kostoyev; the explosion was so powerful that his armoured SUV was thrown 20 meters by the blast and wrecked. The attack in Nazran was presumably committed with a car loaded with remote detonated explosives. On April 7, 2004, President Murat Zyazikov, a former KGB general, was lightly injured by a suicide car bomb, and he was saved by the armour plating of his Mercedes-Benz. On August 26, 2005, Prime Minister Ibragim Malsagov was wounded in a double bomb attack on his motorcade in Nazran which killed his driver. Dzhabrail Kostoyev himself had earlier become the target of several assassination attempts involving bomb and rocket attacks; two of his relatives including a brother, also a police officials, were killed in 2005.
- June 9, 2006 - Two officials were killed minutes apart in Ingushetia by gunmen wearing black uniforms, berets, and masks. The assassinations appeared to be another round of carefully timed attacks against the government. First, Galina Gubina, an administrator responsible for helping ethnic Russian families resettle in the region was gunned down. Then, Musa Nalgiyev, the commander of Ingushetia's OMON riot police, was killed as he drove his three young children to school. Nalgiyev's children were also killed, as were the commander's two guards. In recent weeks, rebels in Ingushetia have also kidnapped Magomed Chakhiyev, a lawmaker and the father-in-law of President Murat Zyazikov, and have attempted to kill Health Minister Magomed Aliskhanov. Galina Gubina earlier escaped an attempt on her life two years ago when a bomb went off under Gubina's car, severely wounding her.
- August 8, 2006 - A car bomb and gun attack killed prosecutor Bitar Bitarov in Dagestan and wounded his two bodyguards. On February 4, 2007 A motorcade including the armored car carrying Dagestani interior minister Adilgerei Magomedtagirov was also fired on as it approached the scene to investigate, and two police officers accompanying him were shot and killed. After this, a second bomb went off around 20 meters from the site of the first blast, wounding three of minister's bodyguards and three civilians. The Interior Ministry said the attacks appeared to have been carefully planned, and the rebels claimed responsibility. The next day two hand grenades targeted the house of Ingushetia's Nazranovsky District prosecutor, Girkhan Khazbiyev, killing his brother and injuring 13 family members.
- August 29, 2006 - A former police chief of an anti-organized crime department in southern Russia was gunned down near a hospital in central Nazran and died at the scene. Akhmed Murzabekov, a district police chief in Ingushetia, was shot three times but survived a previous assassination attempt on August 23. The official said a rapid reaction group following Murzabekov engaged the attackers, possibly wounding one of them, but added that the assailants escaped.
- September 11, 2006 - Three army generals, including Chief of logistics of Russia's North Caucasus Military District, Major-General Vladimir Sorokin, died when an army Mi-8 helicopter crashed in a suburb of Vladikavkaz, killing at least 12. It had a three-strong crew and was carrying a group of 11 high-ranking officers, including Gen. Sorokin and a few other generals, who were taking part in a military exercise that had begun in the region of North Ossetia earlier in the day. The local rebel group Kataib al-Khoul, which has vowed to shoot down Russian military aircraft on September 7, accepted responsibility.
- July 21, 2007 - Gunmen in Karabulak, Ingushetia, killed Vakha Vedzizhev, a well-known figure in the republic and an adviser to Ingushetia's president on religious matters.
- July 26, 2007 - Khura-Magomed Ramazanov, a senior Islamic cleric in Dagestan, was killed by a radio-controlled bomb in Makhachkala. His driver was also killed and his bodyguard was wounded.
- January 12, 2008 - Two high-ranking officers were assassinated when their car came under fire in Nalchik, Kabardino-Balkaria. The victims were the head of the region's UBOP Anatoly Kyarov, and a senior officer of the OMON special police. Two other officers were injured and remained in critical condition. Rebels reported that the actual target for the assault was Chief of the FSB, Nikolai Patrushev.
- November 26, 2008 - Vitaly Karayev, the mayor of the North Ossetian capital, Vladikavkaz, was killed by a gunman. An Islamist group claimed the murder.

== Other ==
=== Assassinations in Moscow ===
- June 25, 2004 - A former top official in Chechnya's pro-Moscow administration, Lieutenant-General Yan Sergunin, was shot point-blank and killed by an assailant riding a motorcycle in downtown Moscow, and his Chechen wife was wounded. Sergunin served as Chechnya's Deputy Prime Minister and Chief of Staff for the late Chechen president, Akhmad Kadyrov, between 2001 and 2003.
- July 9, 2004 - First editor of Forbes Russian edition, American journalist Paul Klebnikov was shot to death on a Moscow street late at night by unknown assailants. In August 2006 a source close to the case told Reuters the investigation was now focusing on a possible link between Klebnikov's murder and his interest in the possible misappropriation of Russian funds intended for the reconstruction of Chechnya. It is possible there's a direct link with the murder of Yan Segunin two weeks before.
- October 7, 2006 - Russian journalist Anna Politkovskaya was found shot dead in the elevator of her apartment block in central Moscow with four gunshot wounds, news agencies reported. She was a prominent critic of the Chechen War and Russian president Vladimir Putin. Politkovskaya's Novaya Gazeta said it believed her murder was either revenge by Chechen Prime Minister Ramzan Kadyrov or an attempt to discredit him. Politkovskaya also angered other powerful people - including the Russian military - with her investigative reporting and human rights advocacy.
- November 18, 2006 - Movladi Baisarov, a Chechen warlord and former FSB special-task unit commander, was killed in central Moscow by members of the Chechen police.
- September 24, 2008 - Chechen clan leader and former Duma deputy Ruslan Yamadayev shot dead near the Kremlin in Moscow.

=== Assassinations abroad ===
- February 13, 2004 - The former Chechen President, Zelimkhan Yandarbiyev, was assassinated by a car bomb in Qatar; up to two other people were killed in the blast and his teenage son was wounded. The Russian government denied involvement in the attack by blaming infighting among rebel factions and a dispute over money. Moscow had, at the time, been involved in a bid to extradite Yandarbiyev to Russia to face terrorism-related charges. A Qatari court convicted two Russian government Foreign Intelligence Service (SVR) agents in the bombing.
- January 13, 2009 - Umar Israilov, former bodyguard and critic of Ramzan Kadyrov, was gunned down in Vienna, Austria.
- March 30, 2009 - Sulim Yamadayev, former commander of a GRU Spetznaz battalion and rival of Ramzan Kadyrov, dies after being shot in Dubai.
