= Malmyzhsky =

Malmyzhsky (masculine), Malmyzhskaya (feminine), or Malmyzhskoye (neuter) may refer to:

- Malmyzhsky District, a district of Kirov Oblast, Russia
- Malmyzhskoye Urban Settlement, a municipal formation which the Town of Malmyzh in Malmyzhsky District of Kirov Oblast, Russia is incorporated as
