= Gorets mutiny =

2006 mutiny in Chechnya, Russia

The Gorets mutiny took place in Chechnya in 2006.

The Goretz (Mountaineer) detachment, was once a spetsnaz unit of the Federal Security Service of the Russian Federation (FSB). It was formally disbanded and its servicemen were to be reassigned to the Chechen Interior Ministry but they refused. Goretz was headed by Movladi Baisarov, formerly a close ally to Akhmad Kadyrov. After Akhmad Kadyrov's death, he came into conflict with his son Ramzan Kadyrov and was declared an outlaw.

The Guardian in June 2006 detailed a showdown between Kadyrov's and Baisarov's forces that had taken place the previous month. The Kadyrovtsy ended up backing down in that confrontation when another Chechen commander, Said-Magomed Kakiyev, head of the Zapad (West) Spetsnaz GRU unit, came down on Baisarov's side.

In October 2006, while Baisarov was in Moscow, it was believed he still commanded 50 to little over 100 men based in Grozny. On November 18, 2006, Baisarov was killed in central Moscow by a detachment of Kadyrov's police.
