= Russian Armed Forces casualties in Syria =

The Russian military intervention in the Syrian civil war started on 30 September 2015, with 4,000 Russian military personnel being stationed in Syria. The Russian forces also consisted of 25 strategic bombers, 20 tactical bombers, 12 attack bombers, 8 fighter aircraft, 16 attack helicopters and various other aircraft.

As of spring 2019, there have been 116 officially confirmed Russian Armed Forces fatalities in the war. Also, two investigative groups, Fontanka and the Moscow-based Conflict Intelligence Team (CIT), reported a conservative estimate of at least 73–101 private military contractors (PMCs) being killed between October 2015 and mid-December 2017, 40–60 of whom died during the first several months of 2017, according to Fontanka and one more PMC was killed in late December 2017. In early 2018, the founder of CIT stated the PMCs' death toll was at least 100–200, while another CIT blogger said at least 150 were killed and more than 900 were wounded. They belonged to the Russian company "Wagner". In February 2018, a number of Russian PMCs were reported to have been killed during the Battle of Khasham. Estimation of casualties varies with some sources reported up to 200 Russian contractors died during the strikes. On 15 March 2023, the Syrian Observatory for Human Rights said that 266 Russian PMCs were killed in Syria during the civil war, while BBC News Russian confirmed by names the deaths of 346 PMCs as of 14 December 2024.

In addition, at least 23 fighters have been killed that were possibly regular military, but their status has not been officially confirmed.

As of 14 December 2024, following the Fall of the Assad regime, BBC News Russian confirmed by names the deaths of 190 servicemen of the regular Russian Armed Forces and 7 officers of the Russian Federal Security Service during the conflict.

== List of fatalities ==
=== Confirmed ===
The following list contains 144 servicemen listed as killed among the regular Russian Armed Forces and 7 officers of the Russian Federal Security Service:

Date of death	Name	Rank	Age	Branch	Cause of death	Location of death
1 October 2015	Edward Sokurov	Sergeant	29	346th Special Purpose Brigade, Spetsnaz GRU	Hostile fire	N/A
24 October 2015	Vadim Kostenko	Private	19	Russian Air Force	Non-hostile (suicide)	Khmeimim airbase, Latakia Governorate
19 November 2015	Maxim Sorochenko	Captain	31	Center for Special Purposes "Senezh", Special Operations Forces (SSO)	Hostile fire	N/A
19 November 2015	Fyodor Zhuravlyov	Captain	27	Center for Special Purposes "Senezh", Special Operations Forces (SSO)	Hostile fire	N/A
24 November 2015	Oleg Peshkov	Lieutenant colonel	45	Russian Air Force	Hostile fire (shootdown)	Syria–Turkey border, Latakia Governorate
24 November 2015	Alexander Pozynich	Seaman	29	Russian Marines	Hostile fire (shootdown)	Syria–Turkey border, Latakia Governorate
1 February 2016	Ivan Cheremisin	Lieutenant colonel	42	Special Operations Forces (SSO)	Hostile fire (mortar attack)	Latakia Governorate
17 March 2016	Alexander Prokhorenko	Senior lieutenant	25	Special Operations Forces (SSO)	Hostile fire (air-strike)	Palmyra, Homs Governorate
12 April 2016	Andrey Okladnikov	Major	38	Russian Air Force	Non-hostile (helicopter crash)	Homs, Homs Governorate
12 April 2016	Viktor Pankov	N/A	N/A	Russian Air Force	Non-hostile (helicopter crash)	Homs, Homs Governorate
7 May 2016	Anton Yerygin	Sergeant	31	International Mine Action Center	Hostile fire (sniper fire)	Palmyra, Homs Governorate
24 May 2016	Asker Bizhoev	N/A	N/A	N/A	Hostile fire (shelling)	Palmyra, Homs Governorate
3 June 2016	Marat Akhmetshin	Captain	35	9th Motorized Rifle Brigade, 3rd Motor Rifle Division	Hostile fire	Palmyra, Homs Governorate
7 June 2016	Mikhail Shirokopoyas	Junior sergeant	35	35th Army	Hostile fire (shelling)	Moscow, Russia (wounds from Aleppo Governorate)
9 June 2016	Oleg Arhireev	Captain	28	Special Operations Forces (SSO)	Hostile fire (landmine)	N/A
14 June 2016	Sergei Pechalnov	Senior lieutenant	28	Special Operations Forces (SSO)	Hostile fire (landmine)	Moscow, Russia (wounds from 9 June 2016, in Syria)
16 June 2016	Andrey Timoshenkov	Sergeant	N/A	Russian Marines	Hostile fire (suicide car-bomb)	Khmeimim airbase, Latakia Governorate (wounds from Homs Governorate)
8 July 2016	Evgeny Dolgin	Lieutenant	24	Russian Air Force	Hostile fire (shootdown)	Palmyra, Homs Governorate
8 July 2016	Ryafagat Khabibulin	Colonel	51	Russian Air Force	Hostile fire (shootdown)	Palmyra, Homs Governorate
22 July 2016	Nikita Shevchenko	Private	N/A	N/A	Hostile fire (improvised explosive device)	Aleppo Governorate
1 August 2016	Roman Pavlov	Captain	33	92nd Helicopter Squadron, Russian Air Force	Hostile fire (shootdown)	Idlib Governorate
1 August 2016	Oleg Shelamov	Senior lieutenant	29	92nd Helicopter Squadron, Russian Air Force	Hostile fire (shootdown)	Idlib Governorate
1 August 2016	Pavel Shorohov	Captain	41	92nd Helicopter Squadron, Russian Air Force	Hostile fire (shootdown)	Idlib Governorate
1 August 2016	N/A	N/A	N/A	Russian Center for Reconciliation	Hostile fire (shootdown)	Idlib Governorate
1 August 2016	N/A	N/A	N/A	Russian Center for Reconciliation	Hostile fire (shootdown)	Idlib Governorate
7 September 2016	Evgeny Zakharchenkov	Junior sergeant	28	14th Special Purpose Brigade, Spetsnaz GRU	Hostile fire	N/A
22 September 2016	Sergey Chernyshov	Major	32	Spetsgruppa "A", Federal Security Service	Hostile fire	Officially listed as killed in Dagestan, Russia
5 December 2016	Nadezhda Durachenko	Sergeant	40 (around)	Ministry of Defence's special medical unit	Hostile fire (shelling)	Aleppo, Aleppo Governorate
5 December 2016	Galina Mikhaylova	Sergeant	40 (around)	Ministry of Defence's special medical unit	Hostile fire (shelling)	Aleppo, Aleppo Governorate
7 December 2016	Ruslan Galitsky	Colonel	44	5th Guards Tank Brigade, 36th Army	Hostile fire (shelling)	Aleppo, Aleppo Governorate
16 February 2017	Pavel Kozachenkov	Major	31	Russian Marines	Hostile fire (improvised explosive device)	Tiyas Military Airbase, Homs Governorate (four kilometers west)
16 February 2017	Vadim Magamurov	Senior lieutenant	31	Main Intelligence Directorate (GRU)	Hostile fire (improvised explosive device)	Tiyas Military Airbase, Homs Governorate (four kilometers west)
16 February 2017	Sergey Senin	Lieutenant colonel	43	N/A	Hostile fire (improvised explosive device)	Tiyas Military Airbase, Homs Governorate (four kilometers west)
16 February 2017	Andrei Zekunov	Colonel	44	152nd Guards Missile Brigade, Russian Marines	Hostile fire (improvised explosive device)	Tiyas Military Airbase, Homs Governorate (four kilometers west)
2 March 2017	Artyom Gorbunov	Private	24	96th Reconnaissance Brigade, 1st Guards Tank Army	Hostile fire	near Palmyra, Homs Governorate
9 April 2017	Alexei Goncharenko	N/A	N/A	N/A	Hostile fire (mortar attack)	Hama Governorate
9 April 2017	Igor Zavidny	N/A	34	N/A	Hostile fire (mortar attack)	Hama Governorate
18 April 2017	Sergey Bordov	Major	N/A	Russian Marines	Hostile fire	Hama Governorate
27 April 2017	Alexei Chugunov	Junior sergeant	39	14th Special Purpose Brigade, Spetsnaz GRU	Hostile fire (mortar attack)	N/A
27 April 2017	Bogdan Derevitsky	Junior sergeant	24	14th Special Purpose Brigade, Spetsnaz GRU	Hostile fire (mortar attack)	N/A
2 May 2017	Alexei Buchelnikov	Lieutenant colonel	N/A	N/A	Hostile fire (sniper fire)	N/A
10 July 2017	Nikolay Afanasov	Captain	33	N/A	Hostile fire (mortar attack)	Hama Governorate
2 August 2017	Kurban Kasumov	Captain	31	3rd Guards Spetsnaz Brigade, Spetsnaz GRU	Hostile fire (mortar attack)	Hama Governorate or Raqqa Governorate
3 August 2017	Valery Emdyukov	N/A	30	3rd Guards Spetsnaz Brigade, Spetsnaz GRU	Hostile fire (mortar attack)	N/A
4 September 2017	N/A	N/A	N/A	N/A	Hostile fire (mortar attack)	Deir ez-Zor Governorate
4 September 2017	N/A	N/A	N/A	N/A	Hostile fire (mortar attack)	Deir ez-Zor Governorate
19 September 2017	Alexei Goynyak	Major	33	Special Operations Forces (SSO)	Hostile fire	N/A
22 September 2017	Alexei Kolganov	Senior sergeant	N/A	N/A	Hostile fire	N/A
23 September 2017	Valery Asapov	Lieutenant general	51	5th Army	Hostile fire (mortar attack)	Deir ez-Zor Governorate
30 September 2017	Valery Fedyanin	Colonel	N/A	61st Naval Infantry Brigade	Hostile fire (mortar attack)	Moscow, Russia (wounds from Hama or Deir ez-Zor Governorate)
10 October 2017	Yuri Kopylov	Captain	42	Russian Air Force	Non-hostile (plane crash)	Khmeimim airbase, Latakia Governorate
10 October 2017	Yuri Medvedkov	Captain	N/A	Russian Air Force	Non-hostile (plane crash)	Khmeimim airbase, Latakia Governorate
31 December 2017	N/A	N/A	N/A	Russian Air Force	Non-hostile (helicopter crash)	15 km from Hama Military Airport, Hama Governorate
31 December 2017	N/A	N/A	N/A	Russian Air Force	Non-hostile (helicopter crash)	15 km from Hama Military Airport, Hama Governorate
31 December 2017	Renat Gimadiev	N/A	N/A	N/A	Hostile fire (mortar attack)	Khmeimim air base, Latakia Governorate
31 December 2017	N/A	N/A	N/A	N/A	Hostile fire (mortar attack)	Khmeimim air base, Latakia Governorate
3 February 2018	Roman Filipov	Major	33	37th Mixed Aviation Regiment, Russian Air Force	Hostile fire (shootdown)	Idlib Governorate
6 March 2018	Vladimir Eremeev	Major general	N/A	27th Guards Motor Rifle Brigade	Non-hostile (airplane crash)	Khmeimim airbase, Latakia Governorate
6 March 2018	38 other deaths (see list of 36 names here )	1 Colonel, 6 Majors, 2 Captains, 29 Junior; Officers and Sergeants	N/A	N/A	Non-hostile (airplane crash)	Khmeimim airbase, Latakia Governorate
3 May 2018	Albert Davidyan	Captain Major	N/A	Russian Air Force	Non-hostile (airplane crash)	Mediterranean Sea near Khmeimim airbase, Latakia Governorate
3 May 2018	Konstantin Dobrynsky	Captain	33	Russian Air Force	Non-hostile (airplane crash)	Mediterranean Sea near Khmeimim airbase, Latakia Governorate
6 May 2018	Nikolay Gushchin	Lieutenant Colonel	39	18th Army Aviation Brigade	Non-hostile (helicopter crash)	eastern Syria
6 May 2018	Roman Miroshnichenko	Lieutenant	24	18th Army Aviation Brigade	Non-hostile (helicopter crash)	eastern Syria
13 May 2018	Igor Melyantsev	Colonel	53	Special Operations Forces (SSO)	Non-hostile (Heart attack)	N/A
23 May 2018	Kirill Polischuk	N/A	25	200th Artillery Brigade, 29th Army	Hostile fire (shelling)	near Mayadin, Deir ez-Zor Governorate
23 May 2018	Sergey Yelin	Senior lieutenant	32	200th Artillery Brigade, 29th Army	Hostile fire (shelling)	near Mayadin, Deir ez-Zor Governorate
23 May 2018	N/A	N/A	N/A	200th Artillery Brigade, 29th Army	Hostile fire (shelling)	near Mayadin, Deir ez-Zor Governorate
23 May 2018	N/A	N/A	N/A	200th Artillery Brigade, 29th Army	Hostile fire (shelling)	near Mayadin, Deir ez-Zor Governorate
2 July 2018	Alexander Popov	Colonel	43	Special Operations Forces (SSO)	Non-hostile (Heart attack)	N/A
17 September 2018	15 servicemen	N/A	N/A	N/A	Friendly fire (shootdown)	Mediterranean Sea, near Latakia Governorate
31 January 2019	Maxim Pletnev	Sergeant	24	Special Operations Forces (SSO)	Hostile fire	near Massasneh, Hama Governorate
23 February 2019	Suhrob Karimov	Major	35	38th Guards Motorized Rifle Brigade, 35th Combined Arms Army	Hostile fire	near Mayadin, Deir ez-Zor Governorate
23 February 2019	Albert Omarov	Colonel	N/A	3rd Guards Spetsnaz Brigade, Spetsnaz GRU	Hostile fire	near Mayadin, Deir ez-Zor Governorate
23 February 2019	N/A	N/A	N/A	N/A	Hostile fire	near Mayadin, Deir ez-Zor Governorate
18 January 2020	N/A	N/A	N/A	N/A	Hostile fire	Idlib Governorate
18 January 2020	N/A	N/A	N/A	N/A	Hostile fire	Idlib Governorate
18 January 2020	N/A	N/A	N/A	N/A	Hostile fire	Idlib Governorate
18 January 2020	N/A	N/A	N/A	N/A	Hostile fire	Idlib Governorate
1 February 2020	Bulat Ahmatyanov	Major	32	Spetsgruppa "S", Federal Security Service	Hostile fire	Aleppo, Aleppo Governorate
1 February 2020	Dmitry Minov	Captain	34	Spetsgruppa "K", Federal Security Service	Hostile fire	Aleppo, Aleppo Governorate
1 February 2020	Ruslan Gimadiev	Major	41	Spetsgruppa "K", Federal Security Service	Hostile fire	Aleppo, Aleppo Governorate
1 February 2020	Vsevolod Trofimov	Lieutenant	32	Spetsgruppa "S", Federal Security Service	Hostile fire	Aleppo, Aleppo Governorate
11 March 2020	N/A	N/A	N/A	N/A	Non-hostile (traffic accident)	Tartus Governorate
22 June 2020	Anton Kopeikin	Lieutenant colonel	43	Spetsgruppa "B", Federal Security Service	Hostile fire	N/A
18 August 2020	Vyacheslav Gladkikh	Major-General	N/A	N/A	Hostile fire (improvised explosive device)	Deir ez-Zor Governorate
6 September 2020	Mikhail Milshin	Sergeant	N/A	N/A	Hostile fire (improvised explosive device)	Moscow, Russia (wounds from Deir ez-Zor Governorate)
13 November 2020	Alexander Tarasyuk	Captain 2nd rank	N/A	Special Operations Forces (SSO)	Hostile fire	N/A
14 January 2021	Mikhail Klimentsov	Ensign	N/A	Spetsnaz GRU	Hostile fire	Idlib Governorate
9 June 2021	N/A	N/A	N/A	N/A	Hostile fire (land mine)	Al-Hasakah Governorate
9 September 2021	Alexey Sneider	Lieutenant colonel	45	61st Marine Brigade	Hostile fire (improvised explosive device)	Homs Governorate
17 June 2022	Ilya Tsuprik	Captain	N/A	Spetsgruppa "A", Federal Security Service	Hostile fire	N/A
25 May 2023	Oleg Pechevisty	Colonel	49	N/A	Hostile fire	N/A
12 June 2023	Umakhan Gadzhesov	Major	N/A	N/A	Hostile fire	Aleppo Governorate
13 October 2023	N/A	N/A	N/A	N/A	Friendly fire	Al-Hasakah Governorate
13 October 2023	N/A	N/A	N/A	N/A	Friendly fire	Al-Hasakah Governorate
13 October 2023	N/A	N/A	N/A	N/A	Friendly fire	Al-Hasakah Governorate
13 October 2023	N/A	N/A	N/A	N/A	Friendly fire	Al-Hasakah Governorate
14 December 2023	N/A	N/A	N/A	N/A	Hostile fire	Daraa Governorate
12 October 2024	Stepan Alektorsky	Captain 1st rank	N/A	Russian Marines	Hostile fire	Deir ez-Zor Governorate
12 October 2024	Nikolai Mikhailenko	Captain 1st rank	N/A	Russian Marines	Hostile fire	Deir ez-Zor Governorate

=== Status unclear ===
The following list contains another 23 killed that were possibly regular military, but were not officially confirmed.

Date of death	Name	Rank	Age	Branch	Cause of death	Location of death
19 June 2016	Vladimir Bekish	Colonel	42	5th Guards Tank Brigade, 36th Army	Hostile fire (shelling)	Aleppo Governorate
8 December 2016	Sanal Sanchirov	Major	37	56th Guards Air Assault Brigade	Hostile fire (mortar attack)	Palmyra, Homs Governorate
5 February 2017	Igor Vorona	Lieutenant colonel	37	N/A	Hostile fire	N/A
February–March 2017	Sergei Travin	N/A	40+	N/A	Hostile fire	N/A
8 April 2017	Gennady Perfilyev	Lieutenant colonel	51	N/A	Hostile fire	N/A
18 April 2017	N/A	N/A	N/A	Russian Marines	Hostile fire	Hama Governorate
3 May 2017	Evgeny Konstantinov	Captain	32	N/A	Hostile fire	Hama Governorate
3 May 2017	Alexander Skladan	Major	37	N/A	Hostile fire	Hama Governorate
June 2017	Kalandarov N. D.	Ensign	N/A	3rd Guards Spetsnaz Brigade, Spetsnaz GRU	Hostile fire	N/A
16 September 2017	Rustem Abzalov	Colonel	N/A	N/A	Hostile fire	N/A
16 September 2017	Vladimir Tarasyuk	N/A	N/A	N/A	Hostile fire	N/A
16 September 2017	N/A	General	N/A	N/A	Hostile fire	N/A
23 September 2017	N/A	Colonel	N/A	N/A	Hostile fire (mortar attack)	Deir ez-Zor Governorate
23 September 2017	N/A	Colonel	N/A	N/A	Hostile fire (mortar attack)	Deir ez-Zor Governorate
18–23 September 2017	Magomed Terbulatov	N/A	N/A	Chechen military police	Hostile fire	possibly Idlib Governorate
September 2017	Yuri Khabarov	N/A	40	N/A	Hostile fire	N/A
October 2017	Mark Neymark	N/A	25	Special Operations Forces	Hostile fire (landmine)	N/A
1 March 2018	Alexander Solopov	N/A	22	291st Artillery Brigade, 58th Army	Hostile fire	Eastern Ghouta
Early March 2018	Vladimir Ponomarev	N/A	N/A	291st Artillery Brigade, 58th Army	Hostile fire	N/A
2 November 2018	Andranik Arustamyan	Junior sergeant	28	21st Guards Motor Rifle Brigade	Friendly fire (anti-tank mine)	Deir ez-Zor Governorate
3 September 2019	Dmitry Syskov	Captain	N/A	Special Operations Forces	Hostile fire (mine)	Idlib Governorate
3 September 2019	Kirill Nikonov	Senior Lieutenant	N/A	Special Operations Forces	Hostile fire (mine)	Idlib Governorate
3 September 2019	Roman Mitsyk	Major	N/A	Special Operations Forces	Hostile fire (mine)	Idlib Governorate

== Out-of-country deaths related to the operation ==
On 25 December 2016, a Russian military Tupolev Tu-154 with 92 people on board crashed in the Black Sea during a flight from Sochi International Airport, Russia to Khmeimim, Syria. There were no survivors. Among those killed were: 64 members of the Alexandrov Ensemble choir, nine journalists, eight crew members, eight other passenger soldiers, two federal civil servants and a prominent Russian humanitarian worker.

== See also ==
- List of aviation shootdowns and accidents during the Syrian Civil War that include Russian aircraft lost during the Syrian Civil War.
- Wagner Group
