= Sulim Yamadayev–Ramzan Kadyrov power struggle =

2008–2009 feud between Chechen warlords

The Sulim Yamadayev–Ramzan Kadyrov power struggle was a feud between rival pro-Moscow Chechen warlords that exploded into armed confrontation between Yamadaev's Special Battalion "Vostok" (East) forces and Chechen President Kadyrov's militia known as the "Kadyrovtsy" following an incident in the town of Argun that led to a shootout in Gudermes on 14 April 2008. The struggle resulted in the eventual disbanding of the Vostok battalion and Yamadaev's assassination in Dubai on 30 March 2009.

== Background ==
Following the assassination of his brother Dzhabrail Yamadayev in 2003, Sulim was appointed commander of the Special Battalion Vostok, a unit of previously separatist fighters from the First Chechen War that had switched sides and fought alongside Russian forces in the Second Chechen War in 1999. The core of the Vostok battalion were former rebels from the 2nd Battalion of National Guard of Ichkeria, which Sulim Yamadaev commanded during the interwar presidency of Aslan Maskhadov. That particular unit was most noted for its near-destruction of the radical Wahabbi “Sharia Regiment" led by renegade Chechen warlord Arbi Barayev in Gudermes in the summer of 1998. Directly subordinate to Russian military intelligence (GRU), Vostok was operationally included in the Russian Army's 42nd Motor Rifle Division, leaving it outside the Chechen command structure and thus the biggest militia beyond Kadyrov's control.

The first public sign of a feud between the two Chechen commanders were public statements made by then-Prime Minister Kadyrov in mid-April 2006. In calling for the shutdown of the Grozny-based operational investigation bureau (ORB-2) of the federal Interior Ministry's Main Administration for the Southern Federal District due to alleged human rights abuses, Kadyrov took things a step further by stating, "Simply the closure of ORB will not do here. After all, it is not only they who abduct, torture and 'disappear' people. These things are engaged in by the fighters of Sulim Yamadaev's 'Vostok' GRU Spetsnaz battalion (we remember the 11 'disappeared' in the settlement of Borozdinovskaya).” At the same time, Colonel Evgeni Baryaev, deputy commander of the federal Interior Ministry's Internal Troops, announced the formation of two new security units, the "Sever" (North) and "Yug" (South) battalions. The creation of these new structures was seen as an effort by Kadyrov to curb the influence of Yamadaev's Vostok and Said-Magomed Kakiev's "Zapad" (West) battalions, as well as further consolidate his monopoly over armed units inside the republic.

== Clash in Gudermes ==
The simmering animosity between the two men finally boiled over on 14 April 2008, when a motorcade of Kadyrovtsy came face-to-face with a motorcade from a Vostok unit led by Badrudin Yamadaev - Sulim's younger brother - in the town of Argun. When neither group would allow the other to pass, Ramzan Kadyrov personally intervened in what appeared to be an effort to defuse the situation; Badrudin Yamadaev would later tell the Russian newspaper Gazeta that Kadyrov had hugged him and called him a "brother".

However, Kadyrov would then order that the Vostok stronghold of Gudermes be surrounded and the main base of the battalion in the city blocked; Chechen police officers loyal to Kadyrov then began detaining Vostok members, triggering an attack by the remainder of the unit on the barracks of the Kadyrovtsy located near the railroad station. The ensuing shootout lasted the entire day, with the opposing sides utilizing heavy machine guns, grenade launchers, and reportedly even armored vehicles. When Kadyrov called in reinforcements from around Chechnya, it resulted in Yamadaev's men being outnumbered by the night of 15 April, with 300-500 police officers loyal to Kadyrov and members of the Sever and Yug battalions surrounding the Vostok base as well as the Yamadaev family's private home in Gudermes.

The situation was only resolved when the commander of Russian forces in Chechnya, a deputy head of the Military Prosecutor's Office for the Southern Federal District, the head of the Chechen branch of the Federal Security Service (FSB) and the head of the GRU staff in Chechnya, among others, accompanied by federal motorized rifle units, arrived on-scene and ordered Kadyrov's squads to move back from both the Vostok base and the Yamadaev family's house. While Kadyrov was enraged, he was unable to do anything about it and thus forced to acquiesce; the rebel website Kavkaz Center reported 16 members of the Vostok and Kadyrovtsy killed in the battle, while Reuters claimed that 18 people had died, including some civilians.

=== Fallout ===
In the immediate aftermath of the Gudermes incident, Kadyrov would publicly accuse the Yamadayev brothers of kidnappings, torture and murders, while demanding that Badrudin Yamadayev be handed over to him. The accusations were supported by Chechen Interior Minister Ruslan Alkhanov, who called Badrudin a "criminal", while Kadyrov pushed the republic's human rights ombudsman, Nurdi Nukhazhiev, to accuse the Vostok commanders of numerous crimes and human rights abuses. Kadyrov also claimed on 17 April that 200 Vostok members had submitted early discharge requests because "they are unwilling to serve under the command of [Sulim] Yamadayev," but would go on to say that he had "advised them not to hurry with the dismissals as the detachment has merits in the fight against international terrorism and there is no sense in terminating contracts because of a commander." In response, Ruslan Yamadaev – an older brother and a deputy to the State Duma from Chechnya – demanded that the Kadyrovtsy be moved out of Gudermes in order to permit the military prosecutor's office to investigate the claims against the Vostok battalion.

In the meantime, federal political leaders had remained quiet in the first days of the confrontation, but on 16 April the head of the Russian Armed Forces' Main Directorate for Combat Training and Service, General Vladimir Shamanov, denied there had been a clash in Gudermes, instead stating that it was "just a warlike gesture". Shamanov's obfuscation of the truth was seen as coming down clearly on the side of the Vostok battalion, as on 14 April an aide to the head of the Investigation Committee of the Prosecutor's Office in Chechnya had already told the media that the Vostok unit was responsible for the traffic incident in Argun that had led to the violence in Gudermes.

Throughout May, Kadyrov would attempt to undermine the Vostok battalion in every possible way; mass graves were unearthed repeatedly, and each time the Vostok fighters were immediately accused of being responsible for the murders. On 12 May, Kadyrov suspended Sulim Yamadayev's command of the battalion, a move officially supported by the Chechen parliament within three days. Later in the month, Chechen utility companies cut off supplies of gas, electricity and water to the Vostok battalion's base in Gudermes, and Kadyrov even received indirect support from Memorial - Russia's most influential human rights organization – when it called for the crimes allegedly committed by members of the Vostok battalion to be fully investigated. On 31 May, Kadyrov announced during a meeting with members of Chechnya's government and the heads of the republic's direct administrations that criminal proceedings were underway against both rank-and-file Vostok members as well as Yamadaev himself.

Yet each time Kadyrov acted against the Vostok battalion and Yamadayev, it was refuted by the Russian Defense Ministry. Four days after the announced suspension of Yamadayev, a military official declared that the Vostok battalion had not been disbanded and that Yamadaev was still in command. Also, when Kadyrov declared criminal proceedings against Yamadayev, the Russian Military Prosecutor's Office issued an immediate denial. The most significant statement was made by General Shamanov on 10 June, when he declared that both the Vostok and Zapad battalions would remain intact, saying, "These battalions will certainly remain, because they not only fulfill important missions as part of the Combined Group of Forces in the North Caucasus, but they also carry out peacekeeping missions in Abkhazia and South Ossetia.” This was viewed as yet another setback for Kadyrov.
