= Valery Asapov =

Russian lieutenant general (1966–2017)

Lieutenant General Valery Asapov
- Валерий Асапов
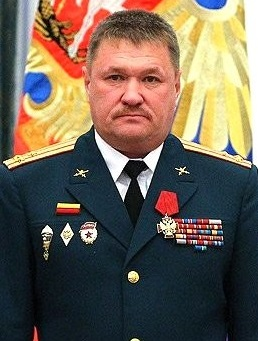
- Asapov in 2013
- Born: 1 January 1966; Kalinino, Malmyzh Raion, Kirov Oblast, Russian SFSR, Soviet Union
- Died: 23 September 2017 (aged 51); Deir ez-Zor, Syria
- Burial place: Federal Military Memorial Cemetery, Moscow Oblast, Russia
- Spouse: Olga Petrovna
- Relatives: Vyacheslav Asapov (brother)
- Military career
- Allegiance: Soviet Union; Russian Federation
- Branch: Russian Ground Forces; Russian Airborne Forces
- Service years: 1987–2017
- Rank: Lieutenant general
- Nickname: Primakov (according to Ukraine)
- Commands: 68th Army Corps; 5th Red Banner Army; 5th Corps of the Syrian Army
- Conflicts: First South Ossetia War; First Chechen War; 2001 Kodori crisis; Second Chechen War; Russo-Ukrainian War (claimed by Ukraine); Syrian Civil War; Battle of Deir ez-Zor †
- Awards: Hero of the Russian Federation (posthumously); Order "For Merit to the Fatherland" IV class Order of Courage; Order of Zhukov (posthumously); Order of Military Merit

Valery Grigorievich Asapov (Russian: Валерий Григорьевич Асапов; 1 January 1966 – 23 September 2017) was a Russian military leader who last served as the Lieutenant General of Russian Ground Forces. According to the Russian Defence Ministry, he was killed on 23 September 2017 by mortar fire from ISIL militants near the city of Deir ez-Zor during the Russian military intervention in the Syrian Civil War making him the most senior Russian officer killed in action to date in the course of the Syrian Civil War. Asapov's position in Syria was described by the Ministry of Defence as the chief of the group of Russian military advisers in Syria.

== Education and career ==
Valery Asapov was born in Malmyzhsky District, Kirov Oblast, to a working-class family as the eldest of four brothers in the family. He graduated from the Ryazan Higher Airborne Command School and was commissioned lieutenant in 1987.

He began his military career in the 76th Guards Airborne Division, based in Pskov, having grown to the position of a battalion commander.

In 1992–1993, Valery Asapov served in South Ossetia. In January 1995, he was sent to Chechnya in Southern Russia. He was seriously wounded during the battle of Grozny in the course of the first First Chechen War. He was operated on four times in various medical institutions and fully recovered a year after, but remained lame.

He entered the M. V. Frunze Military Academy in 1997 and took a degree in 2000, whereafter he was appointed deputy commander of the former 345th Independent Guards Airborne Regiment that was then part of the peace-keeping force stationed in Georgia's breakaway region of Abkhazia. In 2001, he was appointed commander of the 345th Independent Guards Airborne Regiment. In 2003, Colonel Asapov became first deputy Commander of the 98th Guards Airborne Division based in Ivanovo and 18 months later he became chief of staff of the division. In 2003–2004, he participated in the Second Chechen War.

In 2007, he was transferred from the Airborne Troops to the Ground Troops and became commander of the 18th Machine Gun Artillery Division based in the Kuril Islands in the Far East.

In 2011, he graduated from the Military Academy of the General Staff of the Armed Forces of Russia. In June, Col Valery Asapov was appointed commander of the 37th Guards Independent Motor Rifle Brigade (in Kyakhta) of the 36th Army stationed in Buryatia.

On 23 February 2013, Col Valery Asapov, then commander of the Motor Rifle brigade, was awarded the 4th Class of the Order "For Merit to the Fatherland" by Russian president Vladimir Putin. He was promoted to Major General on 8 May 2013.

In early 2014, Maj Gen Asapov assumed command of the 68th Army Corps that was reinstated on the basis of the units already stationed in Sakhalin and the Kuril Islands: the 18th Machine Gun Artillery Division, and the 39th Separate Motor Rifle Brigade.

In July 2015, he was transferred to the Southern Military District, and, according to Main Directorate of Intelligence of the Ministry of Defence of Ukraine as well as other sources, under the alias of "Primakov" participated in the Russian military intervention in Ukraine as commander of the Donetsk People's Republic's 1st Army Corps. On 11 June 2016, Asapov was promoted again to Lieutenant General.

In August 2016, Lt Gen Valery Asapov was appointed commander of the 5th Red Banner Army. Since February 2017, he was sent to Syria, where he headed the group of Russian military advisers, according to the Russian official sources. He was unofficially said to have been assigned to the command post of the Syrian Army's 5th Corps shortly before his death.

== Death ==
On 23 September 2017, he was killed by ISIS in the course of the fighting near Deir ez-Zor by mortar fire from ISIL while assisting the Syrian army.

== Commemoration ==
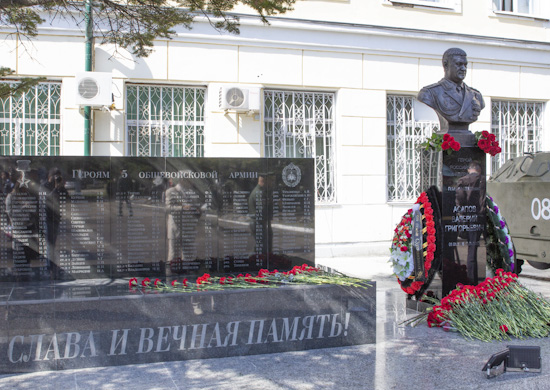
Monument commemorating Asapov in Ussuriysk

He was buried with full military honors in the Federal Military Memorial Cemetery near Moscow on 27 September; the funeral was attended by the Chief of the General Staff Valery Gerasimov. Gerasimov acknowledged Asapov's ″invaluable help to the Syrian army's command in planning and conducting military operations against international terrorists″. President Vladimir Putin by presidential decree, awarded Asapov the title of Hero of the Russian Federation posthumously. He was survived by his wife and two children.

== Official reactions and investigation ==
Shortly after his death, Russian deputy foreign minister Sergei Ryabkov said, "The death of the Russian commander is the price, the bloody price, for two-faced American policy in Syria". At the same time, elsewhere in Syria, Russian air strikes killed at least 37 civilians, including 12 children, in several locations and villages in the district of Jisr al-Shughur in northwestern Idlib province.

A senior member of the Federation Council said that there was intelligence indicating the killing had been facilitated by treason and the relevant investigation was ongoing.

On 26 September 2017, Russia's media reported that, according to the preliminary investigation being conducted by the government of Syria, the killing of Asapov was made possible as a result of the leaking of information about his precise location to the enemy.

== See also ==
- List of Heroes of the Russian Federation
- Russian Armed Forces casualties in Syria
- Russian intervention in the Syrian civil war

Military offices
| Preceded by Position Established | Commander of the 68th Guards Army Corps; 2014–2015 | Succeeded by Alexandr Peryazev |
| Preceded by Aleksey Salmin | Commander of the 5th Guards Combined Arms Army; 2016–2017 | Succeeded by Roman Kutuzov |
