= Dzhabrail =

Dzhabrail is a given name. Notable people with the given name include:

- Dzhabrail Kadiyev (born 1994), Russian footballer
- Dzhabrail Yamadayev (1970–2003), Chechen rebel field commander
