= Yamadayev =

Yamadayev (Feminine: Yamadayeva), also spelled Yamadaev or Yamadaeva, is a Chechen surname, most famously attributed to the Yamadayev brothers, six brothers from the teip Benoy, participants in the First Chechen War on the side of the separatists and the Second Chechen War on the side of the federal troops:

- Ruslan Yamadayev (1961–2008) - colonel of the Russian army, deputy of the State Duma, Hero of Russia.
- Musa Yamadayev (1968–) - former officer of the Special Battalion Vostok, led by his brother Sulim and disbanded in November 2008.
- Dzhabrail Yamadayev (1970–2003) - lieutenant of the Russian army in the Vostok battalion, Hero of Russia.
- Sulim Yamadayev (1973–2009) - lieutenant colonel of the Russian army, former commander of Vostok battalion, Hero of Russia.
- Isa Yamadayev (1975–) - entrepreneur, founder of the construction company Yamad. Member of Parliament of the Chechen Republic of the first convocation.
- Badrudi Yamadayev (1977–) - master of sports in boxing, former member of the Vostok battalion.
