= 3rd Guards Spetsnaz Brigade =

3rd Guards Separate Warsaw-Berlin Red Banner Order of Suvorov 3rd degree Spetsnaz Brigade 48th Separate Guards Reconnaissance Battalion 5th Separate Motorcycle Regiment
- 3-я отдельная гвардейская Варшавско-Берлинская ордена Жукова Краснознамённая ордена Суворова бригада специального назначения
- Sleeve patch
- Active: 26 March 1944–present
- Country: Russia
- Branch: Spetsnaz GRU
- Type: Spetsnaz
- Role: Special reconnaissance Special operations Direct action
- Size: Brigade
- Part of: GRU (operational subordination)
- Garrison/HQ: Tolyatti; MUN 21208
- Anniversaries: March 26th
- Engagements: World War II; First Chechen War; Civil war in Tajikistan; Kosovo War; Second Chechen War; Russo-Ukrainian war; War in Donbas; Russian invasion of Ukraine; Battle of Lyman (September–October 2022)
- Decorations: Guards; Order of the Red Banner; Order of Suvorov 3rd class; Order of Kutuzov; Order of Zhukov
- Honorifics: Warsaw; Berlin

Commanders
- Current commander: Guards Col. Albert Ibragimovich Omarov

The 3rd Guards Separate Warsaw-Berlin Red Banner Orders of Suvorov, Kutuzov and Zhukov Spetsnaz Brigade (Note: Russian: 3-я отдельная гвардейская Варшавско-Берлинская Краснознамённая орденов Жукова, Кутузова и Суворова бригада специального назначения, romanized: 3-ya otdelnaya gvardeyskaya Varshavsko-Berlinskaya Krasnoznamyonnaya ordenov Zhukova, Kutuzova i Suvorova brigada spetsialnogo naznacheniya) (Military Unit Number 21208) is a special forces brigade of the Main Intelligence Directorate (GRU) and thus the Armed Forces of the Russian Federation based at Tolyatti since 2010.

== Background ==
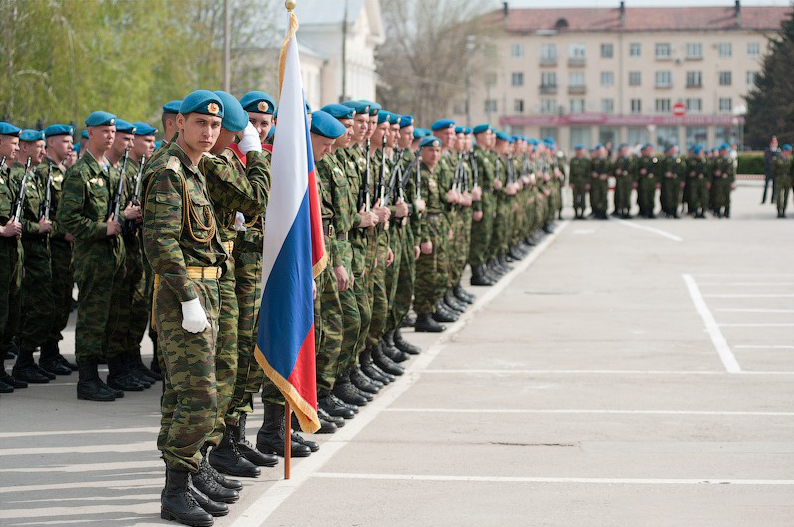
The Brigade at a parade, May 9, 2011

Despite the fact that the brigade itself was created in 1966, its predecessors have a long history.

Traditionally, the brigade traces its heritage to the 5th Separate Motorcycle Regiment. The regiment was established by Soviet General Staff Directive based on 238th Tank Brigade on March 26, 1944. On July 14, 1944, the regiment took part in the fighting, fighting in the 1st Byelorussian Front.

For exemplary performance of assigned tasks, for the seizure of the cities of Lublin, Garwolin, and Żelechów, decree USSR Supreme Soviet Presidium on August 9, 1944, the regiment was awarded Order of Red Banner. On December 1, 1944, the regiment was awarded the honorary title of "Guards."

For the successful execution of assigned tasks to free Warsaw Commander of the Order of February 10, 1945, the regiment was given the name "Warsaw". For exemplary performance of assigned tasks, for the possession of the cities of Woldenberg Zeden? by the decree of the Presidium of the Supreme Soviet on April 26, 1945, the regiment was awarded the Order of Suvorov third degree.

For participation in the assault and capture of Berlin, the regiment was given the name "Berlin" on May 11, 1945. Since October 1945 the 5th Separate Guards Red Banner Order of Suvorov III degree Warsaw-Berlin Motorcycle Regiment of the 2nd Guards Tank Army was in the military townlet Tiefenbrunn.

On April 1, 1947, the 5th Separate Guards motorcycle regiment was disbanded, and on its base the 48th Separate Guards Motorcycle Battalion was established. In accordance with the directive of the General Staff of the number Org 267 486 20 September 1954 in order to improve the organization of reconnaissance units November 28, 1954 48th Separate Guards Motor Cycle Battalion was reformed in the 48th Separate Guards Reconnaissance Battalion.

In accordance with General Staff Directive No. Org /6/111560 on July 9, 1966, 48th Separate Guards Reconnaissance Warsaw-Berlin Red Banner Order of Suvorov III degree battalion was disbanded.

== Soviet Union ==
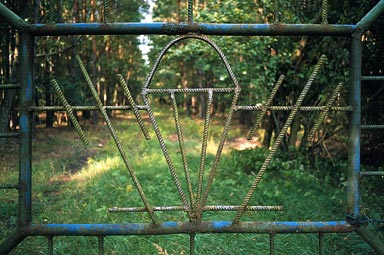
Gate at Neuthymen barracks, Eastern Germany

The brigade was formed in 1966 by a Directive of the Commander Group of Soviet Forces in Germany. It was formed in the garrison Werder (Havel) based 26th separate special battalion and 27th separate special battalion, and 48th and 166th separate reconnaissance battalions.

The brigade was stationed in the town of Fürstenberg/Havel. Part of the brigade units were stationed until 1975 in Neustrelitz, then in Neuthymen. One of the main tasks of the brigade in the 1960–1980s was to detect and destroy the mobile missile systems of potential enemies.

== Russian Federation ==
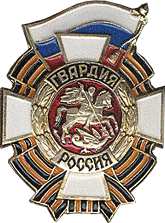
Chest badge for Russian Guards troops.

In April 1991, based on the directives of the Ministry of Defence of the USSR No. 314/1/01500 on November 7, 1990, the brigade was relocated to the village of Roshchinsky, Samara Oblast and came under command of the Volga-Urals Military District. With the reorganisation of the military districts in 2011 it became part of the Central Military District.

=== Tajikistan ===
From September 28, 1992 to November 24, 1992, a Task Force from the brigade participated in combat operations in Tajikistan. Soldiers from the Brigade played a support role to the deployment of the 201st Motorized Rifle Division, guarding military and government facilities, covering the evacuation of the American embassy and escorting humanitarian convoys.

=== First Chechen War ===
On January 17, 1995, the 1st Battalion (509th ooSpN) 3rd Brigade, using Ilyushin Il-76 transport aircraft was transferred to Mozdok, after which a BMP-1 column moved on Khankala. The battalion conducted special reconnaissance around the city of Argun. Operation continued near the village of Komsomolsk, where the battalion assaulted and took a strategic height controlled by the adversary. In the night from March 20 to March 21, 1995, in joint operation with the reconnaissance battalion of the 165th regiment of marines, successfully assaulted and captured height 236.7. The unit continued operations with disarming illegal armed groups near the settlements of Argun and Mesker- Yurt. Later a detachment fought near Gudermes and Shali.

=== Kosovo War ===
Commando teams participated in the peacekeeping missions in Kosovo from July 1999, to October 2001.

=== Second Chechen War ===
The brigade took part in anti-terrorism and counter-insurgency operations from April 2002, to January 2007.

=== Afghanistan ===
On July 21, 2001, on the basis of the 1st Battalion of the brigade, a consolidated group was formed, which until November 2004 provided security for Russian representatives in Kabul.

The brigade was moved from Roshchinsky to Tolyatti in 2010.

=== Ukraine ===
On May 16, 2015, the Armed Forces of Ukraine reported that troops of the 92nd Mechanized Brigade captured two Russians soldiers of the 3rd Guards Spetsnaz Brigade during a fight near Shchastya town (Luhansk oblast, eastern Ukraine). Captured soldiers said they were spetsnaz from Tolyatti, specifically Military Unit 21208. On May 18, 2015, police broke up a brief protest of approximately 12 people at a checkpoint near the Tolyatti base, with some protesters expressing concern about the Russians captured in Ukraine. While the representative of pro-Russian militants Eduard Basurin out of the eastern Ukraine said the captured Russians, Yevgeny Vladimirovich Yerofeyev (Russian: Евгений Владимирович Ерофеев) and Alexander Anatolyevich Alexandrov (Александр Анатольевич Александров), were members of the Luhansk People's Republic People's Militia, Organization for Security and Co-operation in Europe officials said the two Russians admitted to being members of the Russian military. A year later, in May 2016, the soldiers were exchanged for Nadiya Savchenko, a Ukrainian citizen held in Russia.

On October 4, 2022, BBC reported that the brigade suffered its worst casualties to date during fighting in Lyman, Ukraine, with the possibility that 75% of the unit's reconnaissance company troops were lost.

As of November 30, 2022, BBC News Russian and Mediazona reported the unit reportedly lost 56 personnel in the fighting.

== Notable soldiers ==
176 commandos of the brigade have been awarded honors for bravery in combat. Three commandos were awarded the title of Hero of the Russian Federation:

- Guards Petty Officer Anton B. Ushakov (1972–1995) posthumously.
- Guards Lieutenant Alexei Dergunov (1979–2003) posthumously.
- Guards Major Alexei R. Prushkin (1962–1990) posthumously.

== Structure ==
- 3rd Guards Spetsnaz Brigade
  - 3rd Special Purpose Brigade HQ
    - Signals Company
    - Special Weapons Company
    - Support Company
    - Security Company
    - Logistics Company
    - Engineering Platoon
    - Sapper Platoon
    - Medical Center
    - Training Unit
  - 1st Special Purpose Detachment (1st Battalion)
    - 1st special-purpose company (1st RSPN);
    - 2nd special-purpose company (2nd RSPN);
    - 3rd special-purpose company (3rd RSPN);
    - Logistics Company
    - Communications Company
    - Security Platoon
    - Mining Group
    - Engineering Platoon
    - 1st Medical Platoon
  - 790th Special Purpose Detachment (2nd Battalion)
    - 4th special-purpose company (4th RSPN)
    - 5th special-purpose company (5th RSPN)
    - 6th special-purpose company (6th RSPN)
    - Logistics Company
    - Communications Company
    - Security Platoon
    - Mining Group
    - Engineering Platoon
    - 2nd Medical Platoon
  - 791st Special Purpose Detachment (3rd Battalion)
    - 7th special-purpose company (7th RSPN);
    - 8th special-purpose company (8th RSPN);
    - 9th special-purpose company (9th RSPN);
    - Logistics Company
    - Communications company
    - Security Platoon
    - Mining Group
    - Engineering Platoon
    - 3rd Medical Platoon

As of 2012, the spetsnaz brigades were reported to have around 1,600 soldiers at full strength. The exact size of special forces units is classified; it is not known how large the 3rd brigade is.

== Unit citations ==
Ribbon	Award	Year	Location
	Order of Suvorov	1945	Germany
	Order of Red Banner	1944	Poland
	Order of St. George	2010	Russia
