= Roman Filipov =

Russian military pilot

Major Roman Filipov
- Роман Филипов
- Filipov in the 2010s
- Born: 13 August 1984; Voronezh, Russian SFSR, Soviet Union
- Died: 3 February 2018 (aged 33); Saraqib, Idlib, Syria
- Spouse: Olga Filipova
- Children: 2
- Military career
- Allegiance: Russian Federation
- Service years: 2001–2018
- Rank: Major
- Unit: Russian Aerospace Forces
- Conflicts: Syrian Civil War; Northwestern Syria campaign †
- Awards: Hero of the Russian Federation

Roman Nikolayevich Filipov (Russian: Роман Николаевич Филипов; 13 August 1984 – 3 February 2018) was a Russian military pilot who killed himself in a last stand to avoid being captured after being wounded by militants when his Su-25SM jet was shot down in Idlib Province, Syria, on 3 February 2018. Filipov was posthumously awarded the honor of the Hero of the Russian Federation.

== Biography ==
Roman Filipov was born in Voronezh into the family of a military pilot and graduated from school No. 85 in Voronezh in 2001.

Upon completing the Krasnodar Higher Military Aviation School, he was posted at the air base in the village of Chernigovka, Primorsky Krai, (200 km (120 mi) north of Vladivostok) in the Russian Far East. In the summer of 2017, he was stationed in Sakhalin.

On 3 February 2018, during the Syrian Civil War, Filipov was flying a Sukhoi Su-25 accompanied by another Su-25 at an altitude of about 4,000 metres (13,000 ft) on a routine patrol mission over the province of Idlib. Uploaded videos showed the jet was part of a two-ship formation flying at low-to-medium altitude, with the downed aircraft separating and diving to perform a rocket attack. While pulling up after deploying air to ground rockets without deploying defensive flares, the Su-25 was hit by a missile. He was downed by militants over the province of Idlib, near the town of Maarrat al-Nu'man (57 km (35 mi) north of the city of Hama), or the town of Saraqib, according to other sources, presumably by a shoulder launched surface to air missile. Responsibility was claimed by Tahrir al-Sham (formerly known as Jabhat Al-Nusra) and Jaysh al-Nasr, which is affiliated with the Free Syrian Army.

Filipov survived the crash and was last seen on live footage being surrounded by militants and committing suicide with a grenade to avoid capture. On the same day, Russian forces retaliated by firing Kalibr missiles targeting rebel positions in Idlib province responsible for the downing, killing at least 30 rebel fighters.

Filipov's body was repatriated to Russia on 6 February 2018, where he was posthumously awarded the title of Hero of the Russian Federation via presidential decree. Filipov was buried on 8 February 2018, at the Alley of Glory of the Kominternovskoye Cemetery in Voronezh, Russia with thousands of people in attendance. In a speech to the Russian Parliament, Russian president Vladimir Putin hailed his courage and service.

== See also ==
- List of Heroes of the Russian Federation
- List of last stands
- Russian Armed Forces casualties in Syria
- Russian intervention in the Syrian civil war
- List of aviation shootdowns and accidents during the Syrian Civil War
