= Spetsnaz GRU =

Russian special forces unit

- The Spetsnaz GRU logo
- Active: 1949–2012, 2013–present
- Country: Soviet Union (1949–1991); Russian Federation (1991–present)
- Branch: GRU
- Type: Special forces
- Size: Classified
- Part of: Soviet Armed Forces (1949–1991); Russian Armed Forces (1991–present)
- GRU Headquarters: 76 Khoroshyovskoe shosse, Khodinka, Moscow
- Patron: Saint Alexander Nevsky
- Mottos: "Only the stars are above us" («Выше нас только звёзды»)
- Mascot: Bat
- Engagements: Cold War; Operation Danube; Soviet–Afghan War; Civil War in Tajikistan; East Prigorodny conflict; War in Abkhazia; First Chechen War; Invasion of Dagestan; Second Chechen War; Insurgency in the North Caucasus; Russo-Georgian War; Russian military intervention in Ukraine; Russian military intervention in Syria; Russian invasion of Ukraine

Spetsnaz GRU, formally known as Special Forces of the Main Directorate of the General Staff of the Russian Armed Forces, (Russian: Части и подразделения специального назначения Главного управления Генерального штаба Вооружённых сил Российской Федерации) is the special forces (spetsnaz) of the GRU, the foreign military intelligence agency of the Armed Forces of the Russian Federation.

Spetsnaz units are operationally commanded by the Main Intelligence Directorate of the General Staff, and are sourced to the Russian Ground Forces, the Russian Navy, and the Russian Airborne Forces. Spetsnaz troops are used for reconnaissance and sabotage, and are not special operations forces. GRU spetsnaz are separate from the Special Operations Forces Command (KSSO). Since the 2022 Russian invasion of Ukraine, most Ground Forces-sourced spetsnaz brigades have been assigned to Ministry of Defense groups of forces.

== Origins ==
The Stavka began preparing special-purpose (OSNAZ) groups to serve in the GRU in 1937 – training personnel for special-purpose radio units at the engineering radio-technical department of the Budyonny Military Electro-Technical Academy in Leningrad.

The Spetsnaz GRU, the first spetsnaz force in the Soviet Union, formed in 1949 as the military force of the Main Intelligence Directorate (GRU), the foreign military-intelligence agency of the Soviet Armed Forces. The force was designed in the context of the Cold War to carry out reconnaissance and sabotage against enemy targets in the form of special reconnaissance and direct-action attacks. The Spetsnaz GRU inspired additional spetsnaz forces attached to other Soviet intelligence agencies, such as Vympel (founded in 1981) and the Alpha Group (established in 1974) – both within the KGB.

== Modus operandi ==
The concept of using special forces tactics and strategies in the Soviet Union was originally proposed by the military theorist Mikhail Svechnykov, who envisaged the development of unconventional warfare capabilities in order to overcome the disadvantages that conventional forces faced in the field. Svechnykov was executed during the Great Purge in 1938, but practical implementation of his ideas was begun by Ilya Starinov, dubbed the "grandfather of the spetsnaz". Following the entrance of the Soviet Union into World War II, basic forces dedicated to acts of reconnaissance and sabotage were formed under the supervision of the Second Department of the General Staff of the Soviet Armed Forces, and were subordinate to the commanders of Fronts.

The primary function of Spetsnaz troops in wartime was infiltration/insertion behind enemy lines (either in uniform or civilian clothing), usually well before hostilities are scheduled to begin and, once in place, to commit acts of sabotage such as the destruction of vital communications logistics centers, as well as the assassination of key government leaders and military officers.

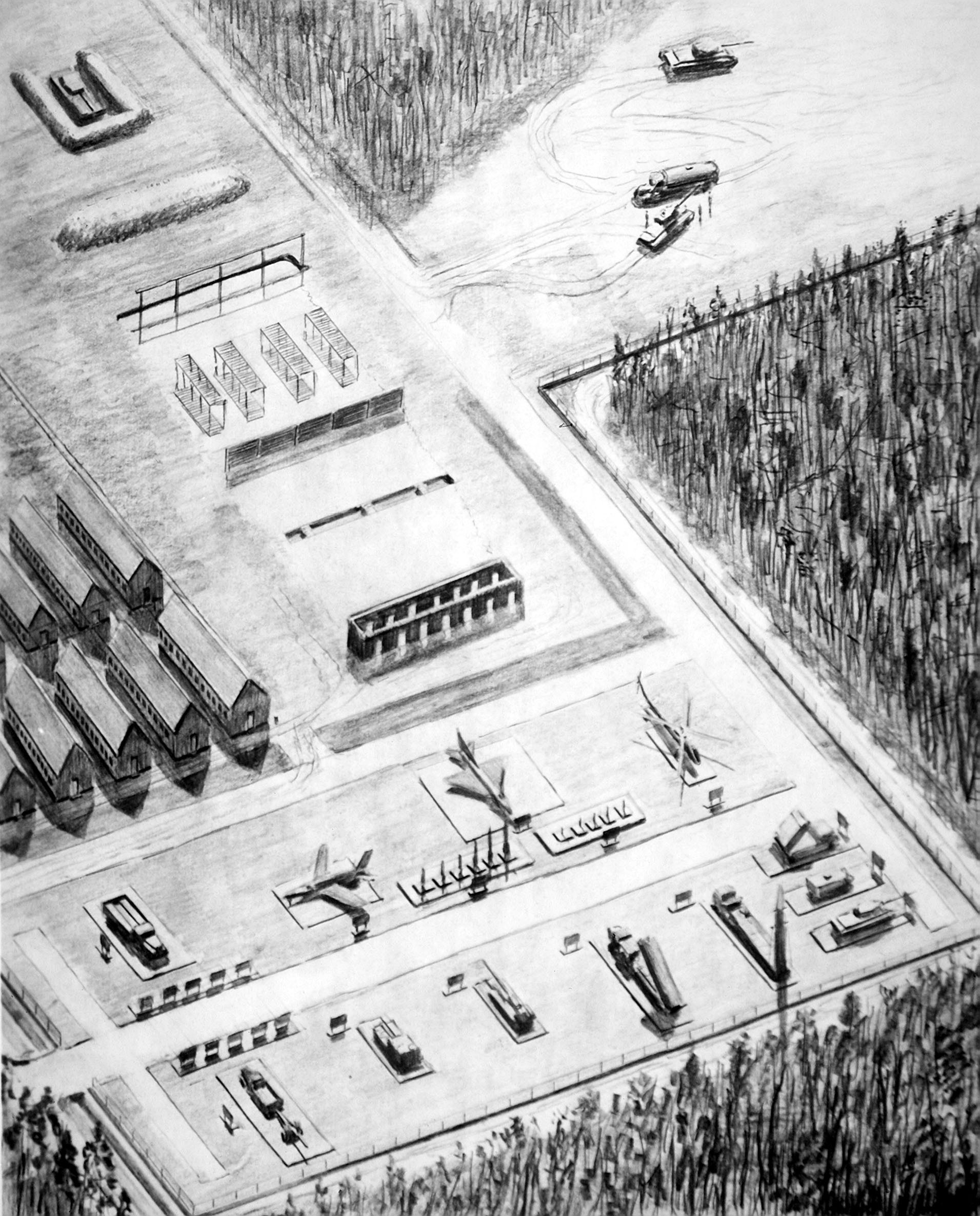
A depiction of a Spetsnaz GRU training installation as published in Soviet Military Power, 1984

Despite Western popular conceptions, GRU spetsnaz are not special operations forces, but focus on reconnaissance and sabotage. Spetsnaz troops receive much less training than a U.S. Army Green Beret or U.S. Navy SEAL, to which they are often misleadingly compared, with the Russian Special Operations Forces Command (KSSO) being a closer equivalent. Within Russia, the Airborne Forces (VDV) and the Naval Infantry are seen as having more of an elite status than the GRU spetsnaz due to their use as assault infantry.

Enlisted members of spetsnaz are recruited at local military offices from recruits or conscripts who had an exceptional performance on their tests. Those that are conscripts often enlist as contract soldiers at the end of their term. Officer candidates compete for spots in the semi-separate training program for the GRU at the Ryazan Guards Higher Airborne Command School.

Spetsnaz GRU training included: weapons handling, fast rappelling, explosives training, marksmanship, counter-terrorism, airborne training, hand-to-hand combat, climbing (alpine rope techniques), diving, underwater combat, emergency medical training, and demolition. Like with other units throughout the Russian military, most of the training is done once a recruit arrives at the unit.

The 8th Directorate, the spetsnaz internal directorate of the GRU, has operational command of spetsnaz units, though it coordinates with the General Staff, the military districts, and wartime groups of forces. Spetsnaz units are sourced to the Russian Ground Forces, the Russian Navy, and the Russian Airborne Forces. Each spetsnaz brigade consists of battalion-sized Independent Special Designation Detachments (OOSNs) of 500 personnel each, which have four company-sized units. The smallest unit is a 14-man team.

== History ==
=== Soviet era ===
The situation was reviewed after the war ended, and between 1947 and 1950 the whole of the Main Intelligence Directorate (GRU) was reorganized. The first "independent reconnaissance companies of special purpose" were formed in 1949, to work for tank and combined-arms armies, which were tasked to eliminate amongst others enemy nuclear weapons systems such as the MGR-3 Little John and MGM-1 Matador.

In 1957, the first Spetsnaz battalions were formed under the GRU, five to operate beyond the 150–200 km range of the reconnaissance companies. The first brigades were formed in 1962, reportedly to reach up to 750 kilometres in the rear to destroy U.S. weapons systems such as the MGM-52 Lance, MGM-29 Sergeant, and MGM-31 Pershing.

Two 'study regiments' were established in the 1960s to train specialists and NCOs, the first in 1968 at Pechora near Pskov, and the second in 1970 at Chirchik near Tashkent. According to Vladimir Rezun, a GRU defector who used the pseudonym "Viktor Suvorov", there were 20 GRU Spetsnaz brigades plus 41 separate companies at the time of his defection in 1978.

==== Known missions ====
The first major foreign operation of the unit came in August 1968, when Moscow decided to crack down on the Prague Spring and move the troops of Warsaw Pact countries into Czechoslovakia. The Spetsnaz GRU was tasked with capturing the Prague Airport. On the night of 21 August, a Soviet passenger plane requested an emergency landing at Prague Airport, allegedly due to engine failure.

After landing, the commandos, without firing a shot, seized the airport and took over air traffic control. At the same time, other Spetsnaz GRU units that had infiltrated into Prague a few days before the operation seized control of other key city points.

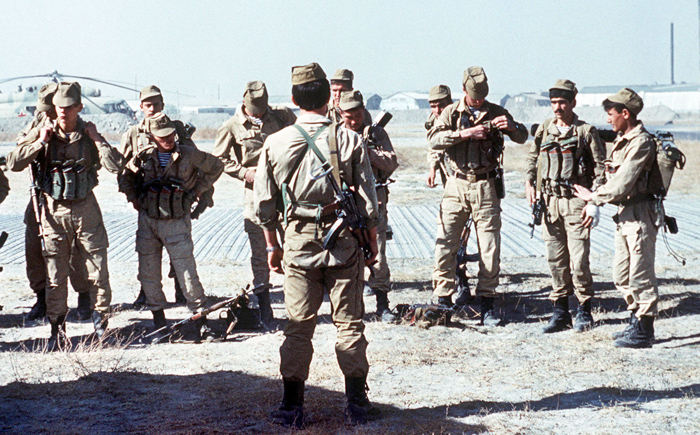
An Afghanka-wearing Soviet Spetsnaz team preparing for a mission at Kabul Airport in Afghanistan in 1988

In December 1979, the undercover Spetsnaz GRU unit codenamed "Muslim Battalion" participated in Operation Storm-333, the successful mission to assassinate Hafizullah Amin, the President of Afghanistan, and to capture Amin's residential palace which triggered the Soviet–Afghan War.

Most of Spetsnaz GRU's operations remain classified even after the dissolution of the Soviet Union. It is believed the special forces had participated in operations in more than nineteen countries around the world in Africa, Asia and South America. From time to time, the men also served as military instructors and set up training camps for Soviet-backed fighters in Vietnam and Angola.

=== Russian Federation ===
Following the deactivation of the Soviet GRU in 1992, control of the special forces was transferred to the newly formed G.U. of Russia and were maintained to their respective assigned units as before. According to Stanislav Lunev, who defected to the U.S. in 1992, the GRU also commanded some 25,000 Spetsnaz troops as of 1997.

Following the 2008 Russian military reform, a brand new Directorate of Special Operations was established in 2009 following studies of American and various Western special operations forces units and commands. The newly formed Special Operations Forces which is directly subordinated to the General Staff, bypassing the GRU. In 2013, the Directorate became the Special Operations Forces Command with a GRU unit transferring to the command.

In 2010, Spetsnaz GRU units were reassigned to the military districts of the Ground Forces and was subordinate to the operational-strategic commands until 2012, due to then Defence Minister Anatoliy Serdyukov's military reforms. This decision was reversed in 2013 and Spetsnaz GRU units were reassigned to their original GRU divisions.

==== Known operations ====
Throughout the mid-1990s to the 2000s, Spetsnaz GRU were involved in both the First Chechen War and more prominently in the Second Chechen War and also the Invasion of Dagestan in August 1999. The special forces learned invaluable lessons from the first war and transformed into a better and more effective fighting force and were instrumental in Russia's and the Russian backed government's success in the second war.

In 2003, during the Second Chechen War, the GRU formed the Special Battalions Vostok and Zapad, two ethnic Chechen units that belonged to the Spetsnaz GRU which fought primarily in Chechnya, and also in the 2008 Russo-Georgian War as well as peacekeeping operations after the 2006 Lebanon War.

Spetsnaz GRU maintains an airborne unit, the Separate Spetsnaz Airborne Reconnaissance Unit (codenamed No. 48427), which participated in the 2008 Georgian War. The unit is housed at Matrosskaya Tishina 10 in Moscow.

During the period of insurgency in the North Caucasus region, Spetsnaz GRU along with special forces from the FSB and MVD conducted numerous special operations and counter-terrorism operations against mainly the Caucasus Emirate, Wilayat al-Qawqaz and other smaller terrorist groups.

After the annexation of Crimea by the Russian Federation, during which some units of Spetsnaz GRU were a part of the "Little green men", and the start of the rebel insurgency by pro-Russian rebels, Ukraine has on numerous occasions accused various Spetsnaz forces of aiding the rebels and even fighting on the ground in Eastern Ukraine. In December 2014, the Ukrainian military claimed that the Spetsnaz GRU was involved in attacks on an airport in Donetsk which was later captured by DPR in the battle.

In late 2015, GRU special forces operators were reportedly involved in the Syrian Civil War, appearing in the government offensives of Aleppo and Homs. GRU officials have also visited Qamishli, near the border with Turkey.

==== Russian invasion of Ukraine ====
Russian Spetsnaz units have been used in the Russian invasion of Ukraine beginning in early 2022, initially tasked with going after high-ranking Ukrainian officials, including president Volodymyr Zelenskyy in order to decapitate the Ukrainian command and control structure, with the objective being to foster chaos. Like other Russian plans during the start of the invasion, the Russian Spetsnaz failed to take out Zelenskyy and the Ukrainian leadership.

The Russian military was not dissuaded by the failure, and continued to use Spetsnaz in the conflict, particularly deploying them when conventional Russian forces faced significant resistance. GRU spetsnaz brigades were repurposed from their original role of reconnaissance and sabotage to provide support to specific sectors of the front, such as during the 2022 Ukrainian counteroffensive in Kherson Oblast and the 2023 Ukrainian counteroffensive in Zaporozhye Oblast. This caused the heavy attrition rate suffered by the Russian forces to also reach the Russian Spetsnaz, according to a Pentagon leak in April 2023, all but one of five Spetsnaz brigades that had participated in the war had suffered significant losses by late summer 2022. According to the estimate, one of the separate Spetsnaz brigades in question had only ″125 personnel active out of 900 deployed.″ During the 2022 Ukrainian counteroffensive that liberated hundreds of square miles of territory in a few days in Kharkiv Oblast, the GRU's 3rd Guards Spetsnaz Brigade, considered one of the most elite Russian units, was caught in the retreat and had to fight a defensive action in the town of Lyman. A report by the BBC assessed that the Spetsnaz unit lost up to 75% of its men during this action.

The high amount of losses suffered in Ukraine are expected to leave a strategic capability gap, since special forces unlike conventional units cannot be ″mass-produced″, the leaked Pentagon documents estimated that it would take Russia up to ten years to reconstitute its special operations capability, and this estimate referred to outdated 2022 figures. Although there are no figures concerning Spetsnaz losses after the summer of 2022, the extremely heavy losses suffered by the entire Russian forces suggest that Spetsnaz units have continued to take significant losses in the invasion.

During 2023 and 2024, GRU spetsnaz units have gradually replaced their reconnaissance patrols with the use of drones, including Lancet and other types, and have been given new missions, including hunting and killing drone operators, destroying air defenses, and finding and destroying radars used for counter-battery and air defense. As of 2024, each of the nine Russian Ground Forces-sourced spetsnaz brigades has remained assigned to the group of forces that they were with at the beginning of the invasion.

== List of GRU special units ==
Below is a list of current "Spetsnaz" units in the Russian Armed Forces that fall under GRU operational control during wartime operations:

- Russian Ground Forces - fields eight spetsnaz brigades of varying sizes and one spetsnaz regiment.
  - 2nd Guards Spetsnaz Brigade – based in Promezhitsa, Pskov Oblast
    - Brigade HQ
      - Signals Battalion (2× Company)
      - Support Company
    - 70th Special Purpose Detachment
    - 329th Special Purpose Detachment
    - 700th Special Purpose Detachment
    - Training Battalion (2× Company)
  - 3rd Guards Special Purpose Brigade – based in Tolyatti
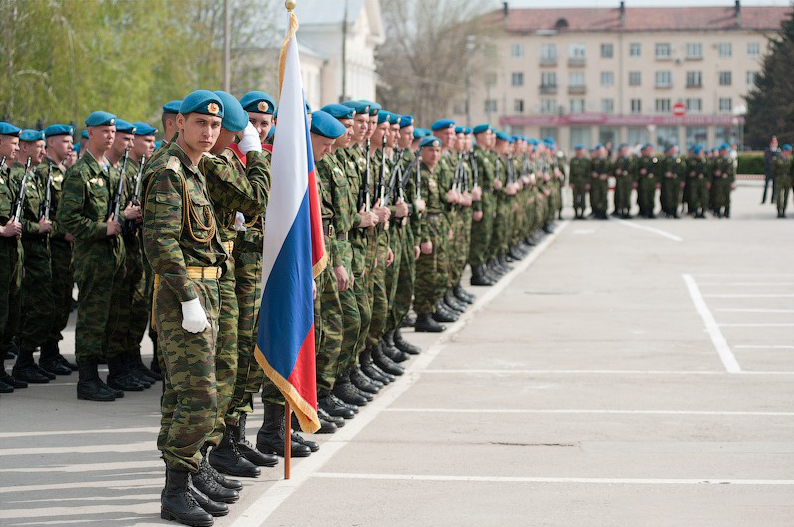
    3rd Spetsnaz Brigade on parade, 9 May 2011
    - Brigade HQ
      - Signals Company
      - Special Weapons Company
      - Support Company
      - Logistics Company
    - 1st Special Purpose Detachment (1st Battalion)
    - 790th Special Purpose Detachment (2nd Battalion)
    - 791st Special Purpose Detachment (3rd Battalion)
    - Training Battalion (2× Company)
  - 10th Special Purpose Brigade – based in Mol'kino, Krasnodar Krai
    - Brigade HQ
      - Signals Company
      - Special Weapons Company
      - Support Company
      - Logistics Company
      - K-9 Unit
    - 325th Special Purpose Detachment
    - 328th Special Purpose Detachment
    - Training Battalion (2× Company)
  - 14th Special Purpose Brigade – based in Ussuriysk
    - Brigade HQ
      - Signals Company
      - Logistics Company
    - 282nd Special Purpose Detachment
    - 294th Special Purpose Detachment
    - 308th Special Purpose Detachment
      - Unknown Department for Unknown Affairs - formerly known as UDUA, currently no information is open to the public as the files regarding it were classified for 100 years and will be declassified on 17 September 2057. The department was established in 1957 by order of the former chairman of the KGB.
    - Training Battalion (2× Company)
  - 16th Guards Special Purpose Brigade – based in Tambov, with all units deployed in Tambov except for the 664th SPD.
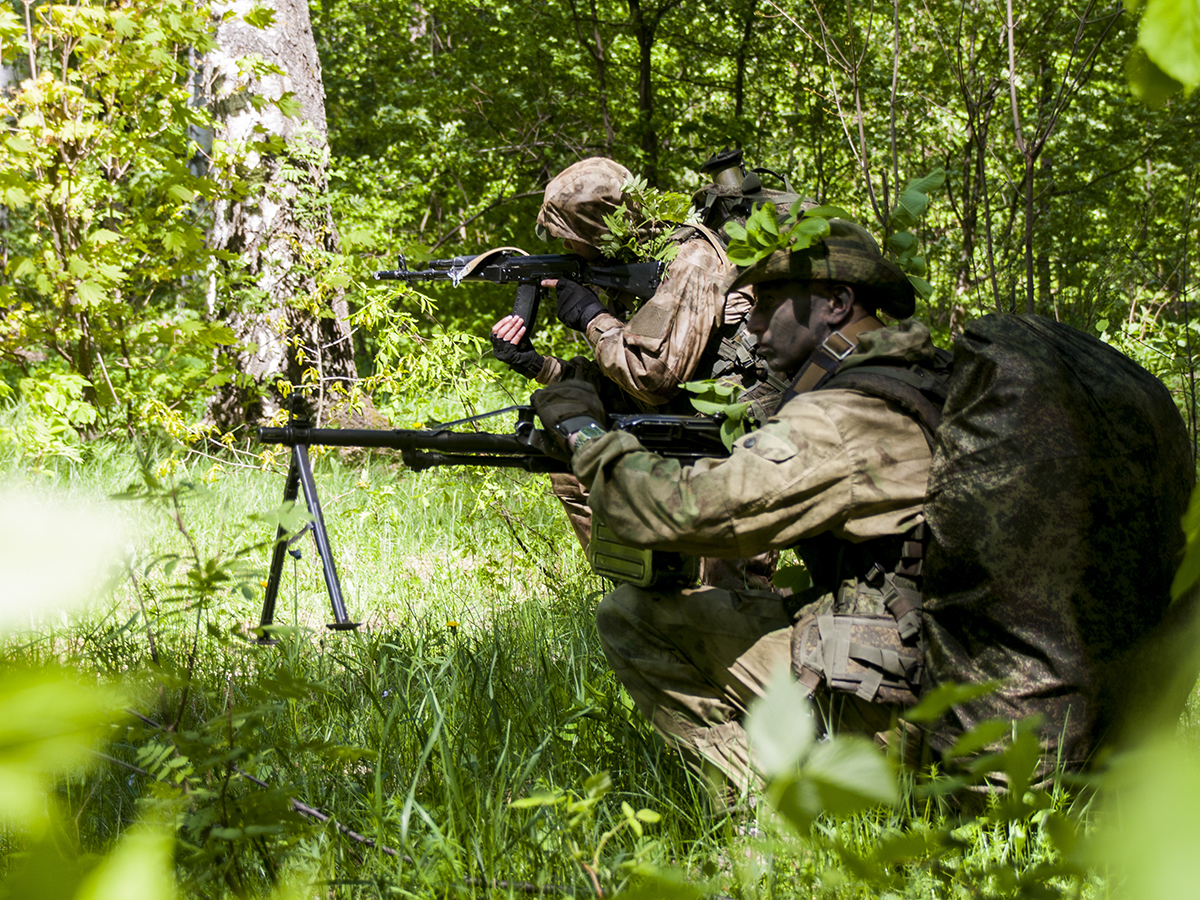
    370th SPD conducting special reconnaissance training (2017)
    - Brigade HQ
      - EOD company
      - Signals Company
      - Logistics Company
    - 370th Special Purpose Detachment
    - 379th Special Purpose Detachment
    - 585th Special Purpose Detachment
    - 664th Special Purpose Detachment
    - 669th Special Purpose Detachment
  - 22nd Guards Special Purpose Brigade – entire unit is based in Stepnoi, Aksaysky District, Rostov Oblast
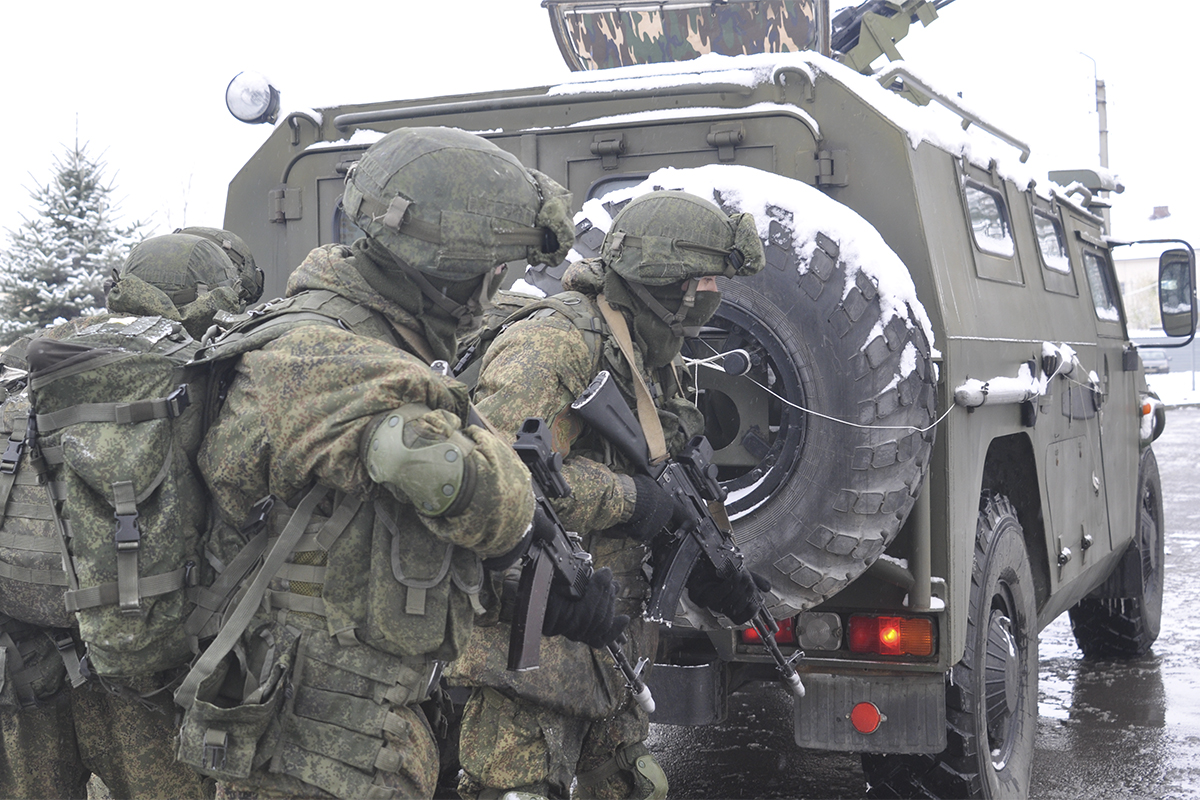
    22nd SPB operatives conducting winter Anti-Terrorist training (2017) with a Gaz Tigr.
    - Brigade HQ
      - Signals Company
      - Support Company
      - Special Weapons Company
      - Logistics Unit
      - Engineer Unit
    - 108th Special Purpose Detachment
    - 173rd Special Purpose Detachment
    - 305th Special Purpose Detachment
    - 411th Special Purpose Detachment
  - 24th Guards Special Purpose Brigade – based in Irkutsk, with all units and units deployed in Irkutsk
    - Brigade HQ
      - Signals Company
      - Special Weapons Company
      - Logistics Unit
    - 281st Special Purpose Detachment
    - 297th Special Purpose Detachment
    - 641th Special Purpose Detachment
  - 346th Special Purpose Brigade
  - 25th Special Purpose Regiment
- Russian Airborne Forces
  - 45th Guards Special Purpose Brigade – based in Kubinka
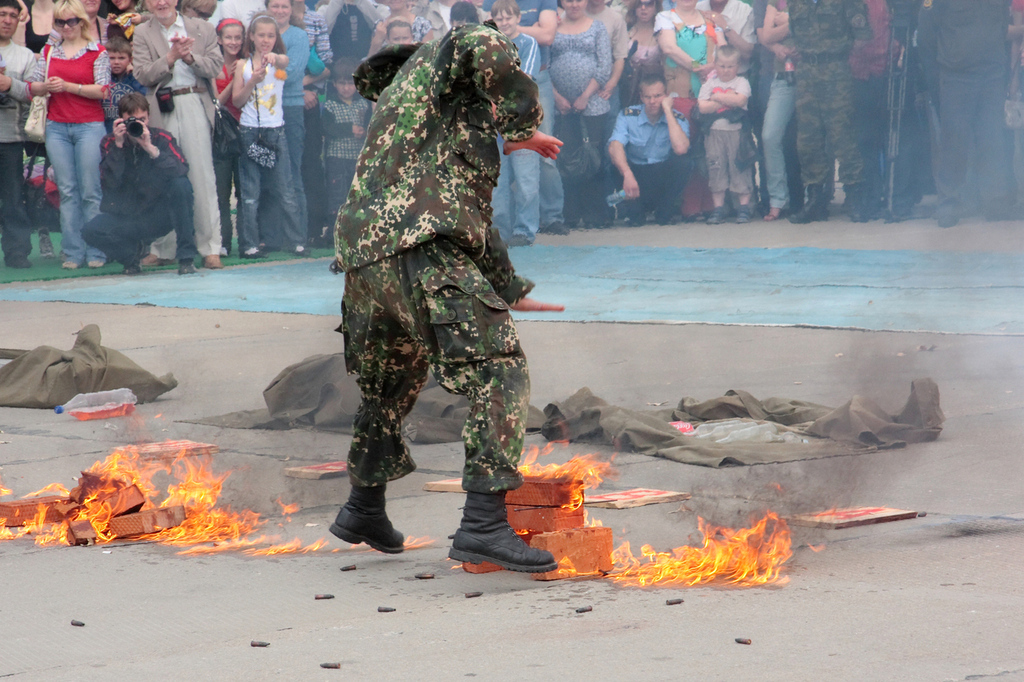
    A paratrooper of the 45th Guards Spetsnaz Brigade at a demonstration show
- Russian Navy

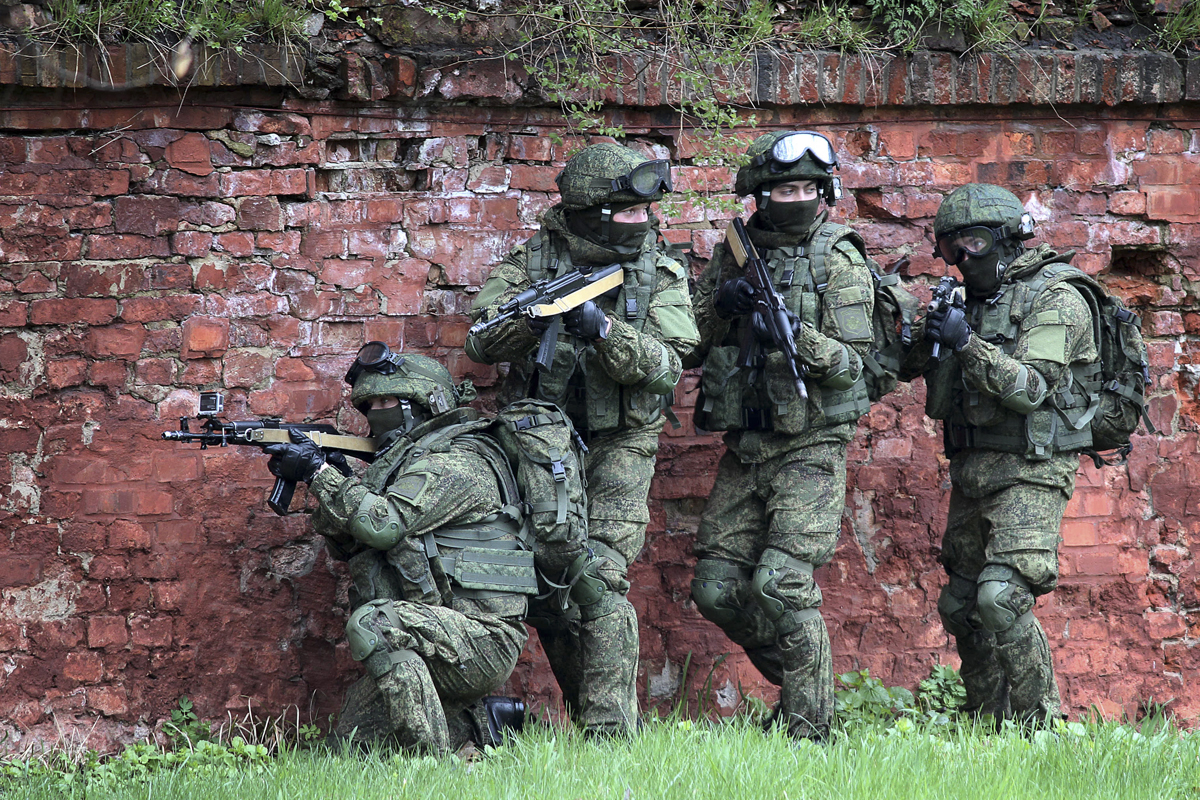
Combat swimmers of the 313th PDSS conduct land operations.

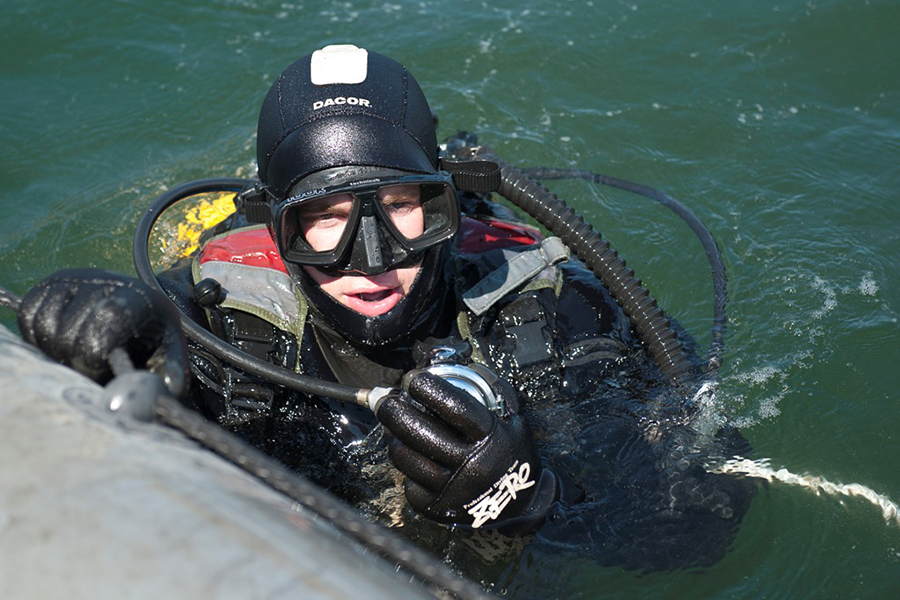
A combat swimmer from the 311th PDSS in Kamchatka (2017)

The navy also fields dedicated maritime sabotage and counter-sabotage diver units which are attached to the naval infantry. These units also include combat swimmers, trained to conduct underwater combat, mining and clearance diving. The task is to protect ships and other fleet assets from enemy frogmen and special forces. The term "combat swimmers" is correct term in relation to the staff of the OSNB PDSS. Every PDSS unit has approximately 50–60 combat swimmers.

There are PDSS units in all major naval bases across Russia. The OMRP is composed of reconnaissance divers that fall under operational subordination to the Main Intelligence Directorate (GRU). There are four OMRPs in Russia serving each fleet: Northern Fleet, Baltic Fleet, Black Sea Fleet and Pacific Fleet, with each consisting of 120–200 personnel.

- Naval Special Reconnaissance (OMRP)
  - 42nd Marine Reconnaissance point (Pacific Fleet)
  - 388th Marine Reconnaissance point (Black Sea Fleet) – reorganized from the former 431st MRP
  - 420th Marine Reconnaissance point (Northern Fleet)
  - 561st Marine Reconnaissance point (Baltic Fleet)
- Special Purpose Detachments for Combat against Underwater Diversionary Forces and Devices (OSNB PDSS)
  - 101st SPDC PDSS - based in Petropavlovsk-Kamchatsky
  - 102nd SPDC PDSS - based in Sevastopol
  - 136th SPDC PDSS - based in Novorossiysk
  - 137th SPDC PDSS - based in Makhachkala
  - 140th SPDC PDSS - based in Vidyayevo
  - 152nd SPDC PDSS - based in Polyarny, Murmansk Oblast
  - 153rd SPDC PDSS - based in Ostrovnoy, Murmansk Oblast
  - 159th SPDC PDSS - based in Razboynik
  - 160th SPDC PDSS - based in Murmansk
  - 269th SPDC PDSS - based in Gadzhiyevo
  - 311th SPDC PDSS - based in Petropavlovsk-Kamchatsky
  - 313th SPDC PDSS - based in Baltiysk
  - 473rd SPDC PDSS - based in Kronstadt

=== Special Battalion Vostok and Zapad ===
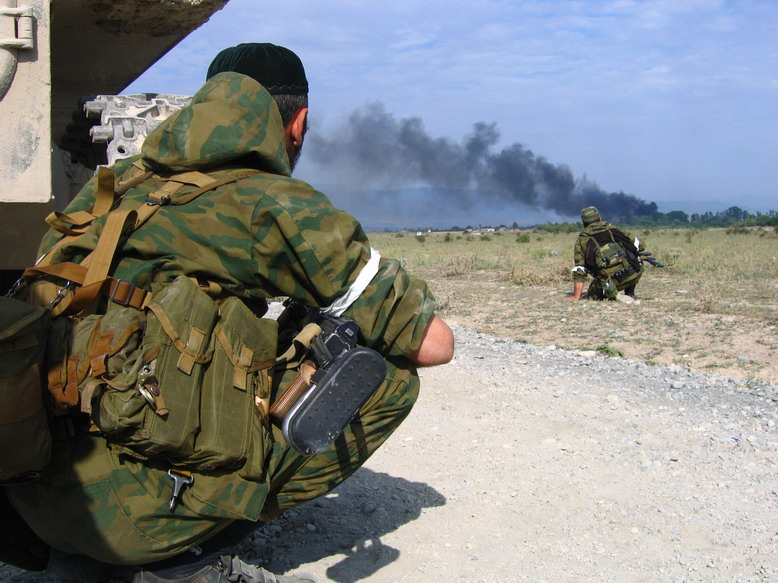
Ethnic Chechen soldiers of Sulim Yamadayev's Special Battalion Vostok in Georgia in 2008

The Special Battalions Vostok and Zapad were two Spetsnaz units; Vostok headquartered at Eastern Chechnya and Zapad headquartered at Western Chechnya. It was subordinate to the GRU and responsible for carrying out mountain warfare and special operations in Chechnya. A power struggle then broke out between rival pro-Russian Chechen warlords then Head of the Chechen Republic Kadyrov and Sulim Yamadaev which led to a series of assassinations and shootouts in the ensuing years forcing the GRU to disband the controversial battalions in November 2008.

== See also ==
- Special Activities Center (Central Intelligence Agency) – American equivalent
- Special Operations Forces (Russia)

Similar foreign special forces units:

- List of special forces units

== Sources ==
- Donnelly, Ted; Ryan, Kevin; Butler, Tom; Hartman, Jeff; Gabel, Lee (March 2025). "How Russia Fights: A Compendium of Troika Observations on Russia's Special Military Operation" (PDF). United States Army Europe and Africa.
