= Borozdinovskaya operation =

2005 Russian military operation in Chechnya

- Part of Second Chechen War
- Location: 43.82°N 46.59°E; Borozdinovskaya, Shelkovsky District, Chechnya
- Date: June 4, 2005
- Target: Ethnic Avar village
- Attack type: Punitive expedition
- Deaths: At least 11 killed
- Perpetrator: Ethnic Chechen Special Battalion Vostok soldiers
- Motive: Murder of a Chechen Special Battalion Vostok member's father resident in the village

The Borozdinovskaya operation was a zachistka-type (Russian: зачистка) operation by Chechen forces in Borozdinovskaya, Chechnya, on June 4, 2005, during the Second Chechen War. Members of the Special Battalion Vostok, an ethnic Chechen Spetsnaz unit of the Russian GRU, killed or disappeared 12 people in the ethnic minority Avar village of Borozdinovskaya, near the border with the Dagestan. Representatives of the Russian federal authorities expressed outrage over the incident, and the commander of the unit responsible was convicted.

== Background ==
The Chechen Republic of Ichkeria (Chechnya) had been de facto independent from Russia since the beginning of the First Chechen War in 1994. During this independence the secular government weakened, and Chechnya came under the increasing influence of warlords and Islamist rule. In August 1999, the War of Dagestan began when Chechen Islamists invaded the Russian state of Dagestan, but were defeated by the Russian military in a month. The War of Dagestan was used as a casus belli to trigger the Second Chechen War, when Russian federal troops entered Chechnya and ended its independence. By June 2000, the war had entered an "insurgency phase", where Russian troops would perform several day-long zachistka (Russian: зачистка) operations in Chechen villages.

Borozdinovskaya is a large village in Shelkovsky District, close to the border with Dagestan near Chechnya's easternmost point, with a predominantly Avar (a Dagestani people) ethnic minority population of around 1,000 people. According to residents of Borozdinovskaya, the ethnic conflict in the area began in the mid-1990s during Chechnya's de facto independence, when many ethnic minorities such as Dagestanis and Russians were being discriminated against by the Chechens, or otherwise pressured to leave by the poor economic conditions and destruction resulting from the First Chechen War. A local Avar strongman named Shapi Mikatov created an armed militia that effectively protected the village from what they called the 'Chechen gangs,' including the men of Sulim Yamadayev, at the time considered most powerful separatist warlord in eastern Chechnya. According to Hussein Nutayev, the pro-Russian head of Shelkovsky District in 2004, Mikatov's militia was rather "a criminal group we call the Avar jamaat ... headed by the infamous warlord Mitabov, who is accused of numerous murders and kidnappings." Mikatov was allegedly killed in 1998, and the following year the Yamadayev brothers accepted an offer to lead the Special Battalion Vostok, effectively changing sides in the conflict from the separatist side to the Russian side. The Special Battalion Vostok was a predominantly ethnic Chechen Spetsnaz unit of the GRU, the Russian foreign military intelligence agency, and operated throughout eastern Chechnya. Since then, residents claimed they began to be targeted by pro-Russian Chechen forces, and the inter-ethnic tensions escalated further when Chechen authorities began resettling displaced persons from Nozhay-Yurtovsky District in the village.

Reportedly, "a series of murders and armed attacks" occurred in May and June 2005 in and around the village, including an incident on June 3 in which the father of a Special Battalion Vostok serviceman was shot and killed.

== Operation ==
According to the official investigation, on June 4, 2005, around 80 Chechen soldiers of the Special Battalion Vostok, in two armored personnel carriers, several trucks, and cars, arrived in the village at 3:00 PM to perform a zachistka "large-scale clean-up." Eyewitnesses stated the operation was led by Khamzat (Hamzat) Gairbekov, also known as "Beard," who was the Vostok unit's intelligence chief. Between 3:30 PM and 8:00 PM, the soldiers detained 11 people "suspected of having committed crimes": Abakar Aliyev, Magomed Isayev, Ahmed Kurbanaliyev, Magomed Kurbanaliyev, Eduard Lachkov (an ethnic Russian), Ahmed Magomedov, Kamil Magomedov, Said Magomedov, Shakhban Magomedov, and Martukh Umarov. None of them have been seen since.

The corpse of a 77-year-old man was later found, either gunned down or burnt alive, and about 200 men were also rounded up and herded into the local school's sports hall, where many were severely beaten. Four private homesteads were burnt down and cars, money, and other valuables were stolen from the village residents.

== Aftermath ==
The Vostok battalion raid had prompted a mass exodus of almost the entire population of the village and contributed to a political standoff in both Chechnya and Dagestan. Most of the residents quickly packed up and crossed the border to Dagestan, where they set up a tent city near the town of Kizlyar. There, they received support from the local Avar opposition and resisted attempts by the Dagestan OMON riot police to force them back into Chechnya. The refugees eventually agreed to return to Chechnya after the pro-Russian Chechen government of Ramzan Kadyrov promised to search for the abducted villagers and to pay compensation for the damage caused by the Vostok battalion. Dmitry Kozak, the Russian presidential envoy to the Southern Federal District, met with the villagers and spoke about "an act of sabotage against the Russian state by extremists," promising an objective investigation to punish those responsible.

=== Responsibility ===
At first, the pro-Moscow Chechen police officials said 11 separatist "sympathizers" were detained and two insurgents killed in fighting. Later, the Russian military claimed the killings and abductions of civilians were committed by separatists later after the Vostok troops had left the settlement. Sergey Surovikin, the commander of the 42nd Motor Rifle Division to which Yamadayev's militia belonged, said the allegations were “groundless and aimed at destabilizing the political situation and staining the honor and name of the honest career officer and Hero of Russia, Sulim Yamadayev.”

On October 27, 2005, Mukhadi Aziyev, the company commander of the Vostok battalion, was convicted by Grozny Garrison Military Court of "exceeding official authority" and given a three-year suspended sentence. The fate of the abducted people was not established, and a legal demand for compensation brought by villagers against the Russian Ministry of Defence was rejected. In June 2007, the villagers held a 300-strong protest action in Dagestan. In September 2007, the Caucasian Knot reported that more than 130 Borozdinovskaya refugees had begun to resettle in Kizlyar District.

Sulim Yamadayev, now a Russian colonel and commander of the Vostok battalion, had at first denied that his subordinates were involved in the raid. Later, he admitted his servicemen's guilt, but said that the operation had been conducted without his knowledge. In 2006 and again in 2008, during the conflict between Ramzan Kadyrov and the Yamadayev clan, Kadyrov used the case as an example of the crimes of the Vostok unit in his attacks on the Yamadayev brothers.

As a result, even some representatives of the Russian federal government expressed outrage over the incident, a rare occurrence during the conflict as federal authorities were usually reluctant to denounce human rights violations by their forces.

== See also ==
- Forced disappearance
- Chechen-Russian conflict
