= Movladi Baisarov =

Chechen warlord

Movladi Baisarov (1966 – November 18, 2006) was a Chechen warlord and former Federal Security Service (FSB) special-task unit commander. Baisarov was shot dead on the street in central Moscow by members of the Chechen extra-agency guard on November 18, 2006.

== Career ==
During the separatist regime of Aslan Maskhadov, Baisarov was a minor field commander whose forces operated in the Grozny area, described by the Russian Grani.ru website as a "prominent 'Wahhabi'". When the Second Chechen War began, he became attached to Akhmad Kadyrov, who was mufti of Chechnya at the time. Baisarov's former rebels turned into Kadyrov's bodyguards and Baisarov became the commander of the Chechen Presidential Security Service.

In 2004 when Akhmad Kadyrov, the president of Chechnya at the time, was assassinated in a bomb attack, his security force was disbanded. Baisarov's people turned into the secretive Gorets ('Highlander') paramilitary unit, subordinate to the tactical department of the North Caucasus FSB and based in the hamlet of Pobedinskoye (Pobedinskoe), north-west of Grozny. According to Chechen human rights activists, its main function was kidnapping operations and summary executions. In Chechnya it had a reputation of a death squad and Baisarov was believed to maintain a prison and torture chamber in the village.

== Conflict with Ramzan Kadyrov ==
At the end of 2005, the regional FSB was closed down under pressure from Chechen authorities. At that time, Chechen Prime Minister Ramzan Kadyrov decided to dissolve Gorets unit as well and reassign its members to various law enforcement structures under his control. Baisarov was counting on support from his former FSB managers to let him maintain the unit, perhaps by making its members a special unit of Chechen MVD's extra-agency guard department, which he would lead.

When Baisarov refused to be subordinate to Ramzan Kadyrov, his forces were blockaded at their base in Pobedinskoye and the Chechen prosecutor brought back the 2004 criminal case against Baisarov. At that time, ten members of the local Musaev (Musayev) family were kidnapped and killed in Grozny; they were later found in a mass grave. The prosecutor and Chechen UBOP established that members of the Gorets unit kidnapped them and that Baisarov personally shot some of them with a noiseless VSS Vintorez sniper rifle. According to investigators, Baisarov thus avenged the death of his brother Sharani, who also served in Akhmad Kadyrov's personal security service and died with him in the bomb blast.

Baisarov denied his involvement in the murder of the Musaev family members and was eventually declared wanted on those charges but only as a witness. Chechen prosecutors did not place Baisarov on a federal wanted list, and the Chechen MVD only did so three days before Baisarov died but he was also formally not charged with anything. There are also questions about the jurisdiction: if Baisarov was really a senior officer in the FSB (he had identification in his pocket showing him to be a Lieutenant Colonel of the FSB), the military prosecutor or the FSB itself should have summoned him for questioning, not the civil prosecutor.

== Death in Moscow ==
Baisarov went to Moscow and appeared in the Russian media saying that Ramzan Kadyrov was trying to hunt him down to get rid of possible competition. He accused the young Kadyrov of directing numerous political murders and kidnappings. At the same time, he told Kommersant that he was not hiding from anyone in Moscow and was expecting to return to Chechnya soon to become the deputy prime minister in charge of law enforcement.

The situation changed a few days before the death of Baisarov, as up to 50 Chechen police officers - formed into two groups specially to eliminate him - arrived in Moscow from Chechnya. Some information indicates that the group was being overseen personally by Adam Delimkhanov, the first deputy prime minister of Chechnya. The arrival of the Chechen group in Moscow had been preceded by negotiations with the top leaders of Russian law enforcement agencies. Baisarov's FSB guard was suddenly removed, and several of his comrades were taken into custody and sent back to Chechnya. On November 14, some 33 last Gorets fighters in the republic were disarmed. Three days later unknown persons destroyed two of three oil wells controlled by Baisarov outside Pobedinskoye just one day before his death. People close to Baisarov say that he spent last week calling his former managers from the dissolved regional FSB. Allegedly, Baisarov intended to give evidence that would prove his innocence and, at the same time, show his political opponents' guilt of kidnappings and murders, and give testimony about his knowledge in the Anna Politkovskaya assassination; however, the last contact he had with the Lubyanka ended with him being told: "The program is closed. Don't call anymore."

Movladi Baisarov was killed at about 6:00 p.m, when he arrived in a Russian VAZ-1111 car at 30 Leninsky Prospekt apparently for a prearranged meeting. Witnesses say that Baisarov got out of his car and approached a group of plainclothed Chechens standing nearby. When they recognized Baisarov, who was unshaven and wearing a black jacket, they shouted at him and then fired on him with automatic weapons. Most of the bullets struck him in the head. The assailants then fled by car in the direction away from the city center.

The circumstances surrounding the "special operation" on Leninsky Prospekt were so strange that the Prosecutor's Office in Moscow was compelled to initiate a criminal investigation of Baisarov's death. A prosecutor's spokesman told Kommersant that the investigation was looking for the reason the operation was carried out by Chechen police, using the "methods of their republic", instead of Moscow police. The prosecutor's office has classified Baisarov's killing as murder and determined that he suffered 11 bullet wounds. The investigation has determined that seven of those wounds were made by the AKS-74U assault rifle belonging to Sultan Rashayev, lieutenant in the extra-agency guard service. It was not known who else shot at Baisarov, but shells from both assault rifles and standard-issue police pistols were also found at the scene of the crime, as were shells from a Stechkin APS machine pistol. Most of the shots were fired at point blank range.

== See also ==
- List of kidnappings
- List of Second Chechen War assassinations
- List of unsolved murders (2000–present)
- Ruslan Yamadayev
