= Sulim Yamadayev =

Chechen warlord (1973–2009)

- Сулейман Бекмирзаевич Ямадаев
- Yamadayev in 2007
- Born: Suleiman Bekmirzayevich Yamadayev; 21 June 1973; Benoy, Russian SFSR, Soviet Union
- Died: 30 March 2009 (aged 35); Dubai, United Arab Emirates
- Cause of death: Assassination
- Relatives: Ruslan Yamadayev (brother); Dzhabrail Yamadayev (brother)
- Military career
- Allegiance: Chechen Republic of Ichkeria (until 1999); Russian Federation (after 1999)
- Branch: Spetsnaz GRU (direct subordination)
- Service years: 1994–2008
- Rank: Podpolkovnik
- Commands: Special Battalion Vostok
- Known for: Yamadayev–Kadyrov power struggle
- Conflicts: Chechen–Russian conflict; First Chechen War; Second Chechen War; Post-Soviet conflicts; Russian invasion of Georgia
- Awards: Hero of the Russian Federation (2004)

Suleiman Bekmirzayevich Yamadayev (Russian: Сулейман Бекмирзаевич Ямадаев; 21 June 1973 – 30 March 2009), or simply Sulim Yamadayev (Сулим Ямадаев), was a Chechen military commander. The fourth of six Yamadayev brothers, he fought for the Chechen Republic of Ichkeria during the First Chechen War before defecting to Russia during the Second Chechen War, in which he commanded Special Battalion Vostok under Spetsnaz GRU. As such, until 2008, he was officially in command of the biggest pro-Kremlin militia beyond those controlled by Chechen president Ramzan Kadyrov, who has led Chechnya since 2007. From 1 to 22 August 2008, Yamadayev was wanted on an active federal arrest warrant in Russia, but continued to command Special Battalion Vostok uninterrupted during the Russian invasion of Georgia.

On 5 March 2003, Yamadayev's older brother Dzhabrail was assassinated in a bombing attack. On 24 September 2008, his oldest brother Ruslan was shot dead on Smolenskaya Embankment in Moscow, and though initial press reports identified him as Sulim, the name was later corrected. On 28 March 2009, Yamadayev himself was shot multiple times at an underground parking garage in Dubai; it was believed that he had been killed at the scene, but his younger brother Isa claimed that he had actually been taken to a hospital and died two days later. At the time, Yamadayev had been locked in a year-long power struggle with Kadyrov.

== Biography ==
Yamadayev studied business in Moscow before returning to Chechnya. He once said that his dream was to become a fighter and that during a time he decided to go to Afghanistan to train. Under the Chechen president Aslan Maskhadov, he served as a field commander and commanded a special forces detachment which routed a radical Wahhabi militia at Gudermes in 1998.

During the Second Chechen War, the Yamadayevs and Akhmad Kadyrov arranged for their stronghold of Gudermes to be taken over by federal forces without a fight. Later, Sulim became leader of the GRU Spetsnaz unit called the Special Battalion Vostok ("East") of nearly 600 men, succeeding his brother Dzhabrail Yamadayev following his assassination in 2003. While working closely with the General of the Army Alexey Maslov, Sulim Yamadayev received the medal and title of Hero of the Russian Federation after his Vostok battalion killed the commander of the Arab Mujahideen in Chechnya, Abu al-Walid, in April 2004. Together with his paramilitary soldiers known within Chechnya as Yamadayevtsy, which are alleged to be unruly and prone to mix warfare with crime, Yamadayev often conflicted with Ramzan Kadyrov (the son of Akhmad) and Said-Magomed Kakiyev over who controls overall military authority in Chechnya. Isa and Badrudi, the younger brothers of Sulim, became the company commanding officers in the battalion.

On 14 April 2008, the forces loyal to Yamadayev and Ramzan Kadyrov engaged in one of the biggest battles between rival Chechen factions. The clash occurred when convoys from each group ran into each other in Gudermes and reportedly resulted in around 18 dead. A bitter conflict between the men loyal to Yamadayev and forces of Kadyrov followed. In this conflict, Kadyrov prevailed and eventually Yamadayev was sacked from his post and declared a wanted "criminal" in Chechnya. On 6 August, the previous 'Hero of Russia' Yamadayev and some of his commandos were put on a federal wanted list. According to his brother and Duma deputy Ruslan Yamadayev, Sulim still allegedly lived in Moscow and did not hide at the time of the warrant being issued. The other Yamadayev brother, Badrudi was placed on the federal wanted list earlier in 2008. According to Moscow-based defence analyst Pavel Felgenhauer, "It's important because this had been a rare challenge to Kadyrov in Chechnya. Now, it's clear that Yamadayev has been quashed and Kadyrov controls Chechnya."

A few days after he was declared wanted in Russia, Gazeta reported that Yamadayev was participating in military actions in the outskirts of Tskhinvali in the Georgia's breakaway Republic of South Ossetia. Novaya Gazeta military correspondent Arkady Babchenko accompanied Yamadayev and his remaining loyal men in Georgia. Following the war, on 22 August, RIA Novosti reported Yamadayev was officially dismissed from his post as commander of the Vostok battalion in Chechnya. On the same day, the search for Yamadayev was stopped, officially because the Chechen MVD had established his whereabouts (according to investigatory bodies, Yamadayev was in Moscow).

On 24 September 2008, Ruslan Yamadayev and a retired Russian army General Sergey Kizyun (protector of the Yamadayev clan) were shot in Sulim's car in the central Moscow while driving from the Kremlin; Ruslan Yamadayev was fatally wounded. Initial press responses reported the name of the victim as "Sulim Yamadayev"; this was corrected later. Sulim Yamadayev blamed Kadyrov and vowed to avenge the death of his brother.

== Assassination ==
On 29 March 2009, Sulim Yamadayev was reported to be the victim of an assassination in Dubai, where he lived for several months as Suleiman Yamadayev and/or Suleyman Madov; his two bodyguards said he was shot in the back of the neck in an underground garage. The police attempted to detain a Russian citizen in connection with the attack, but the suspect was able to flee. However, despite the early reports of death, according to his younger brother, Isa, Yamadayev survived at least three gunshot wounds and was hospitalized in critical condition. According to RIAN, Yamadayev was placed in a military hospital after surviving an assassination attempt: he reportedly returned fire on his attackers, which "saved his life." Dubai police dismissed this, reporting that Yamadayev died instantly from wounds sustained during the shooting. Chechen president Ramzan Kadyrov confirmed on 1 April that Yamadayev had been buried in the Gulf state.

On 5 April 2009, the Dubai Police Force accused Adam Delimkhanov of ordering the assassination. Delimkhanov is a member of the Russian State Duma for the United Russia party and Kadyrov's cousin and a close associate. He denied the accusation, saying it was "a provocation and an attempt to destabilize conditions in the Chechen Republic." Later, the Interpol has issued arrest warrants for seven Russian citizens in connection with the killing. Besides Delimkhanov, Zelimkhan Mazayev, Elimpasha Khatsuyev, Salman Kimayev, Tirpal Kimayev, Ramazan Musiev and Marvan Kimayev were named as being wanted for "crimes against life and health".

== Accusations of crimes ==
- In August 2008, Sulim Yamadayev became officially wanted for the 1998 kidnapping and murder of the local businessman Usman Batsaev, a resident of the village of Dzhalka in Gudermessky District. According to the prosecution, Yamadayev reportedly had demanded $100,000 ransom for the release of Batsaev and he later told the victim's relatives where the grave was located in April 2000. The involvement of Yamadayev in kidnappings for ransom was also alleged in 2006 in Anna Politkovskaya's last article published in her lifetime (Politkovskaya wrote that according to data of the prosecutor’s office, Yamadayev's "band" had engaged in kidnapping before the legalization as a GRU unit).
- In June 2005, his battalion carried out the Borozdinovskaya operation, a cleansing raid that resulted in the murder of an elderly man and the disappearance of 11 civilians who were never seen again. Later, one of the Vostok commanders was given a three-year suspended sentence. Yamadayev, commander of the Vostok battalion at that time, has admitted his servicemen's guilt, but claimed that the operation had been conducted without his knowledge.
- Yamadayev's men were accused of severing the heads of their dead victims, and sexually abusing, torturing and executing prisoners. In 2007, a Russian photographer by the name of Dima Beliakov followed Sulim Yamadayev and his Vostok battalion on a mission in Chechnya's Vedensky District; his pictures revealed harsh behavior of Vostok servicemen during raids. In May 2008, a Vostok unit serviceman revealed the location of a secret burial ground at the decommissioned biochemical fertilizer plant near Gudermes, from which seven completely decomposed corpses were recovered. The next day, the man revealed the burial site of Vostok's platoon leader Vakharsolt Zakayev, shot in 2003 on suspicion of having murdered Dzhabrail Yamadayev.
- There were also reports that Yamadayev was involved in extortion of money from the meat processing factory Samson in Saint Petersburg, raided by a Chechen militia (allegedly Vostok troops) in 2006.
- Chechen President Ramzan Kadyrov accused Sulim Yamadayev of complicity in the assassination of his father Akhmad Kadyrov and attempts to kill Ramzan by poisoning a lake near Ramzan's residence.

According to the Russian human rights organization Memorial in August 2008, "Now we know from evidences of eyewitnesses that during the war in Georgia the fighters of the Vostok battalion were humanely treating the prisoners of war. As far as I understand, the Chechen battalion didn't take part in pogroms [of Georgians in Gori District], and everything incriminated to Yamadayev refers to the past."

== See also ==
- Yamadayev brothers
- List of Heroes of the Russian Federation
