= Shali, Russia =

Shali (Russian: Шали) is the name of two inhabited localities in Russia.

- Shali, Chechen Republic, a town in Shalinsky District of the Chechen Republic
- Shali, Republic of Tatarstan, a rural selo in Pestrechinsky District of the Republic of Tatarstan
