= Malmyzh, Kirov Oblast =

Town in Kirov Oblast, Russia

Malmyzh Малмыж Малмыж (Mari)
- Town
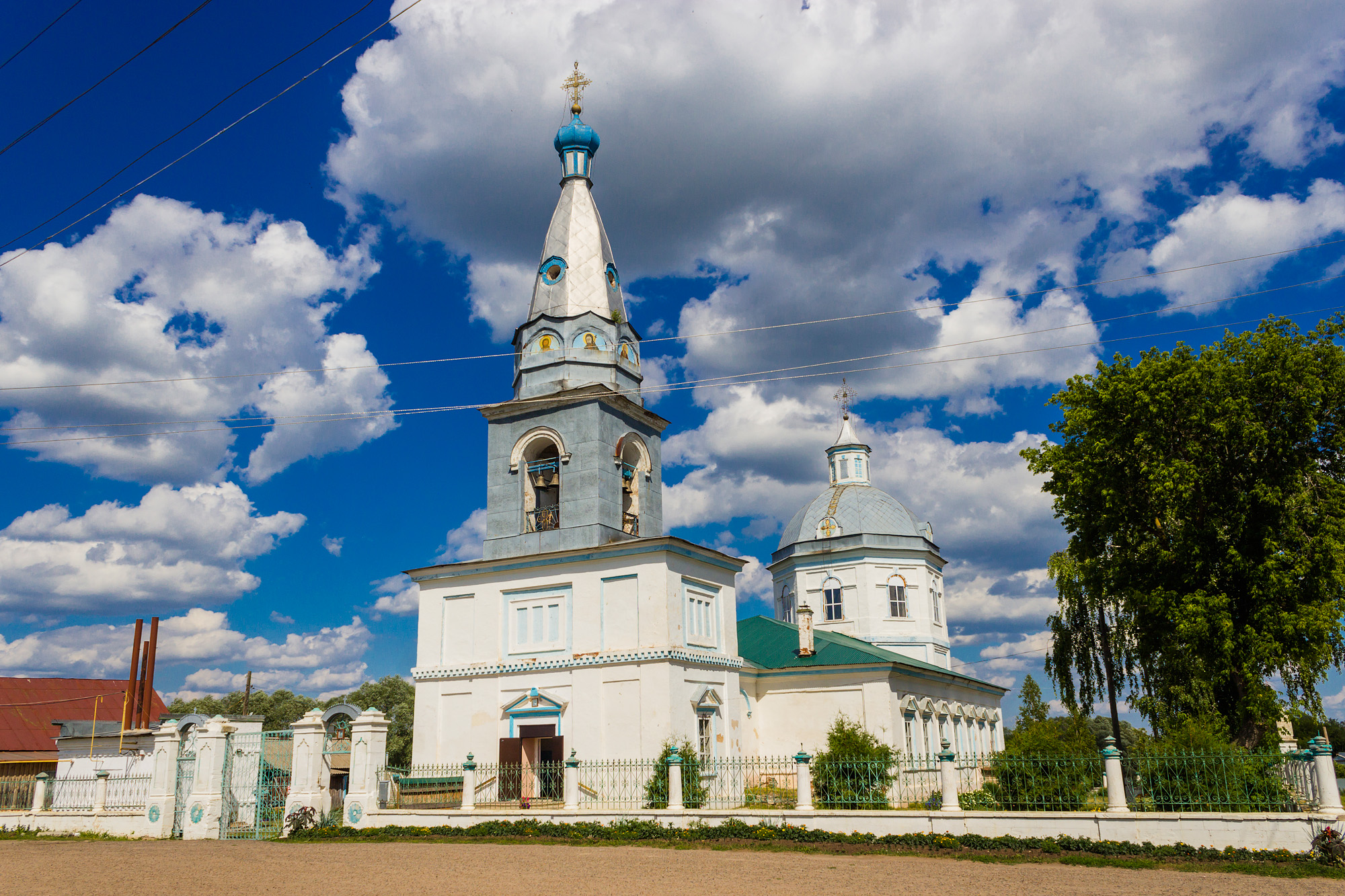
- Epiphany Cathedral, Malmyzh

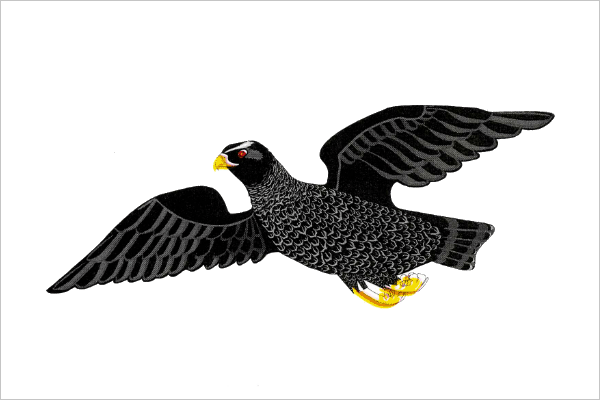
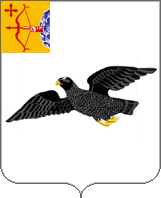
- Flag Coat of arms
- Interactive map of Malmyzh
- Location of Malmyzh Malmyzh (Kirov Oblast)
- Coordinates: 56°32′N 50°41′E
- Country: Russia
- Federal subject: Kirov Oblast
- Administrative district: Malmyzhsky District
- TownSelsoviet: Malmyzh
- First mentioned: 15th century
- Town status since: 1780
- Elevation: 100 m (330 ft)

Population (2010 Census)
  - Total: 8,265
  - Estimate (2021): 6,931 (−16.1%)

Administrative status
  - Capital of: Malmyzhsky District, Town of Malmyzh

Municipal status
  - Municipal district: Malmyzhsky Municipal District
  - Urban settlement: Malmyzhskoye Urban Settlement
  - Capital of: Malmyzhsky Municipal District, Malmyzhskoye Urban Settlement
- Time zone: UTC+3 (MSK)
- Postal codes: 612920, 612921
- OKTMO ID: 33623101001

Malmyzh (Russian: Малмы́ж; Mari: Малмыж, occasionally called Malmış/Малмыш in Tatar) is a town and the administrative center of Malmyzhsky District in Kirov Oblast, Russia, located on the Shoshma River (Vyatka's tributary), near its confluence with the Zasora, Moksha, and Krupny Lach Rivers, 294 kilometers (183 mi) southeast of Kirov, the administrative center of the oblast. Population: 8,265 (2010 census); 9,318 (2002 census); 10,699 (1989 Soviet census).

== History ==
It was first mentioned as the Mari village of Malmyzh in the 15th century. Malmyzh was the capital of Mari Malmyzh principality subordinated to Kazan. Mari prince Boltush (Poltysh) offered resistance to Russian offensive and was killed by a cannonball on April 26, 1553. Russian fortress was built here in 1584 to suppress recalcitrant Mari people. It was granted town status in 1780.

== Administrative and municipal status ==
Within the framework of administrative divisions, Malmyzh serves as the administrative center of Malmyzhsky District. As an administrative division, it is incorporated within Malmyzhsky District as the Town of Malmyzh. As a municipal division, the Town of Malmyzh is incorporated within Malmyzhsky Municipal District as Malmyzhskoye Urban Settlement.
