= Special Battalions Vostok and Zapad =

Military units

Special Battalion Vostok Special Battalion Zapad
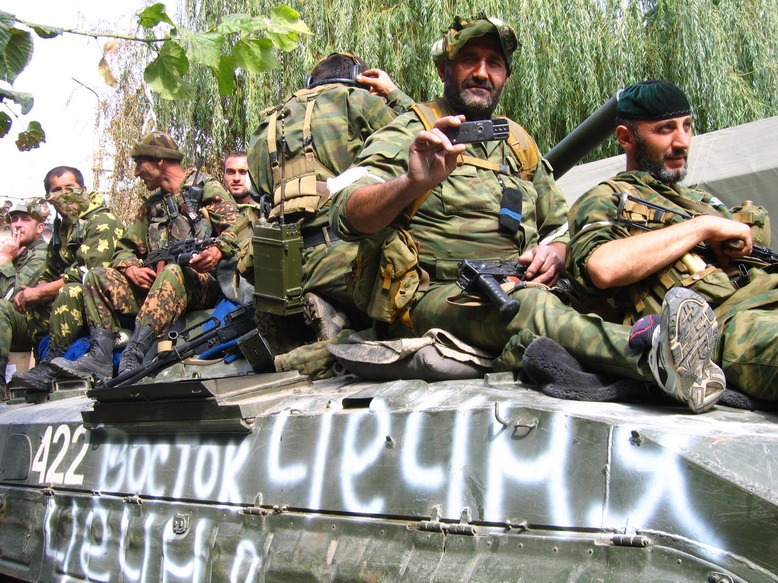
- Battalion Vostok soldiers in Georgia in 2008
- Active: 2003–2008
- Country: Russia
- Branch: GRU (direct subordination); 42nd Guards Motor Rifle Division (operational command)
- Type: Spetsnaz
- Size: 1,200–1,800 active personnel
- Garrison/HQ: Eastern Chechnya (Vostok); Western Chechnya (Zapad)
- Engagements: Second Chechen War; Russo-Georgian War

Special Battalions '"Vostok" and "Zapad"(Russian: Специальные батальоны "Восток" и "Запад", lit. "East" and "West") were two spetsnaz units of the GRU, the military intelligence agency of Russia, based in Chechnya. The overwhelming majority of the personnel were ethnic Chechens, while the command personnel were mixed ethnic Russians and Chechens. The Special Battalions were formed during the Second Chechen War as a force of Chechen volunteers under the direct control of the Russian government to perform combat patrols, combined arms, and irregular warfare operations in the mountain forests of Chechnya. The two units operated independently from each other, with Zapad covering the western half of Chechnya and Vostok covering the eastern half, and their own commanders subordinate to the GRU but under the command network of the 42nd Guards Motor Rifle Division.

The Special Battalions Vostok and Zapad operated for most of the Second Chechen War, and were briefly deployed by Russia in conflicts outside of Chechnya, until they were disbanded in 2008.

== Organization ==
Vostok and Zapad were organized at the end of 1999, initially as two special companies formed in the structure of the Mountain Grouping of the Russian Ministry of Defence; they were assigned to the commandant's offices (kommendantura) established on the territory of the Chechen Republic in 2002. The Chechen personnel were of diverse origins. Zapad servicemen were loyal to the Russian government, while the core of Vostok were former separatist fighters of the 2nd Battalion of the National Guard of Ichkeria from Gudermes, who had fought against Russian troops in the First Chechen War of 1994–1996; they then switched to the federal side and swore allegiance to Russia. The units were directly subordinate to the GRU, but operationally they were included in the structure of the 42nd Guards Motor Rifle Division. Following the 2006 Lebanon War, members of both units were sent to protect Russian field engineers on a peacekeeping mission in Lebanon.

The two battalions (each about 600-900 strong) were the only ethnic Chechen units in the structure of the Russian Ministry of Defence and outside the control of the Chechen government, which was increasingly dominated by the Chechen militia leader Ramzan Kadyrov. Zapad was commanded by career officer Said-Magomed Kakiyev while Vostok was controlled by the controversial Yamadayev clan (thus earning them the name of Yamadaevtsy, or "Yamadayev men"), which was powerful enough to rival Kadyrov. Kakiyev and three of the Yamadayev brothers received the Hero of the Russian Federation award. The brothers owned their TV station, Vostok, and several other businesses in Chechnya and Moscow. One of the brothers, Ruslan Yamadayev, became a State Duma deputy representing Chechnya. On the other hand, Kakiyev kept a low profile.

In April 2008 escalating tensions between Ramzan Kadyrov (by then the Chechen president) and the Yamadayevs—including occasional armed clashes—erupted into an open and violent conflict. The Vostok unit's leaders were accused by the Chechen government, members of the public, and human rights groups of many crimes including forced disappearances, kidnappings for ransom and murders. Soon hundreds of Vostok fighters reportedly deserted their unit and joined Kadyrov's formations, and in June the Russian army announced it would transform both special battalions into regular motorized-rifle companies. Both Vostok and Zapad were involved in the conflict in South Ossetia in August 2008, with Vostok commanded by Sulim Yamadayev, (despite his official dismissal from the post and his status as a wanted man). Reportedly, the Vostok detachment suffered losses in Georgia but were not accused of committing any crimes there.

In November 2008, both battalions were disbanded under continued pressure from Kadyrov. It was also announced that a special commission set up by the Ministry of Defence, together with the Military Prosecutor's Office, would investigate the alleged crimes of their former servicemen. The Yamadayevs and their loyalists were chased out of Chechnya, and Ruslan Yamadayev was shot dead in Moscow. Their houses were ransacked and burned, and the mosque they built in Gudermes was dismantled. Four months later, Sulim Yamadayev was assassinated in exile in Dubai—according to the UAE authorities, by order of Kadyrov's right-hand man Adam Delimkhanov. Kadyrov in turn accused the former commanders of Vostok of repeated attempts to kill him and of complicity in the 2004 assassination of his father, Chechen president Akhmad Kadyrov, responsibility for whose killing had been officially claimed by separatist commander Shamil Basayev. Kakiyev managed to avoid the fate of the former Vostok leaders by agreeing to resign his command of the Zapad battalion in 2007, since then, he has kept a formal position in the Russian military structure in Chechnya.

== Gallery ==
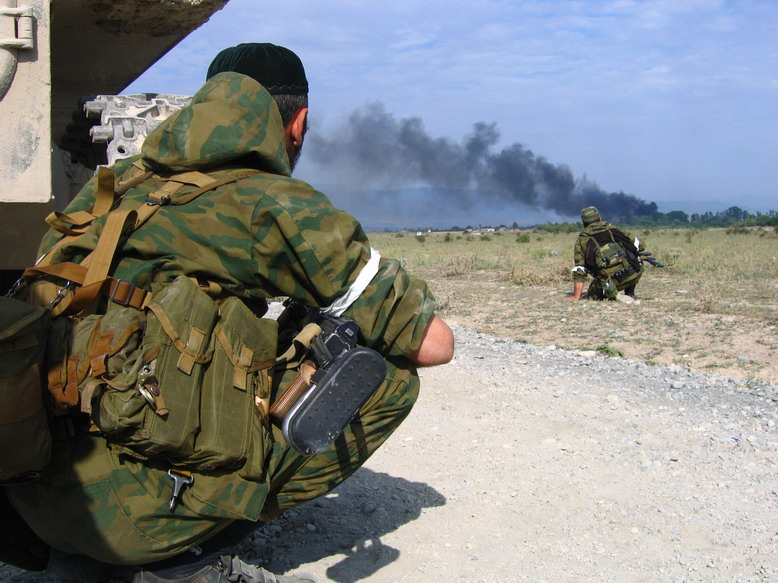
Soldiers of the Vostok Battalion in South Ossetia during the Russo-Georgian War in 2008

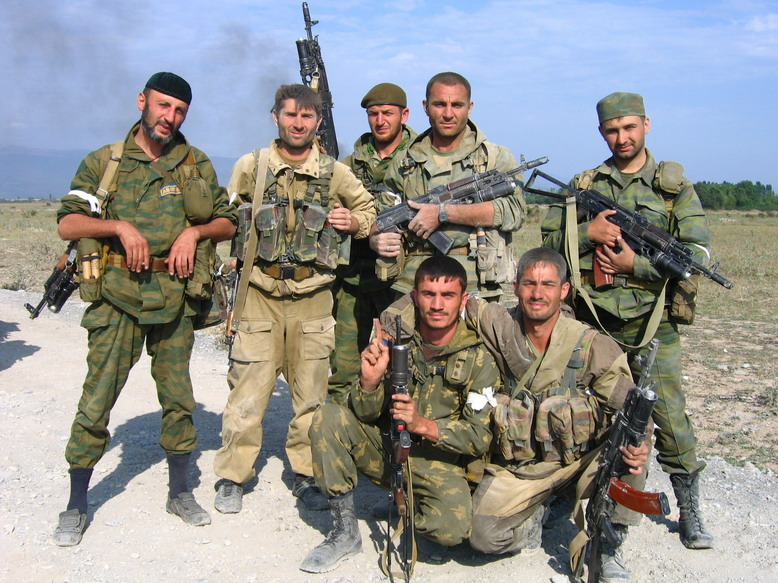
Battalion Vostok in South Ossetia in 2008

== See also ==
- Borozdinovskaya operation
- Dzhabrail Yamadayev
- Sulim Yamadayev–Ramzan Kadyrov power struggle
- Kadyrovtsy
