= Malmyzhsky District =

Malmyzhsky District Малмыжский район (Russian)
- District
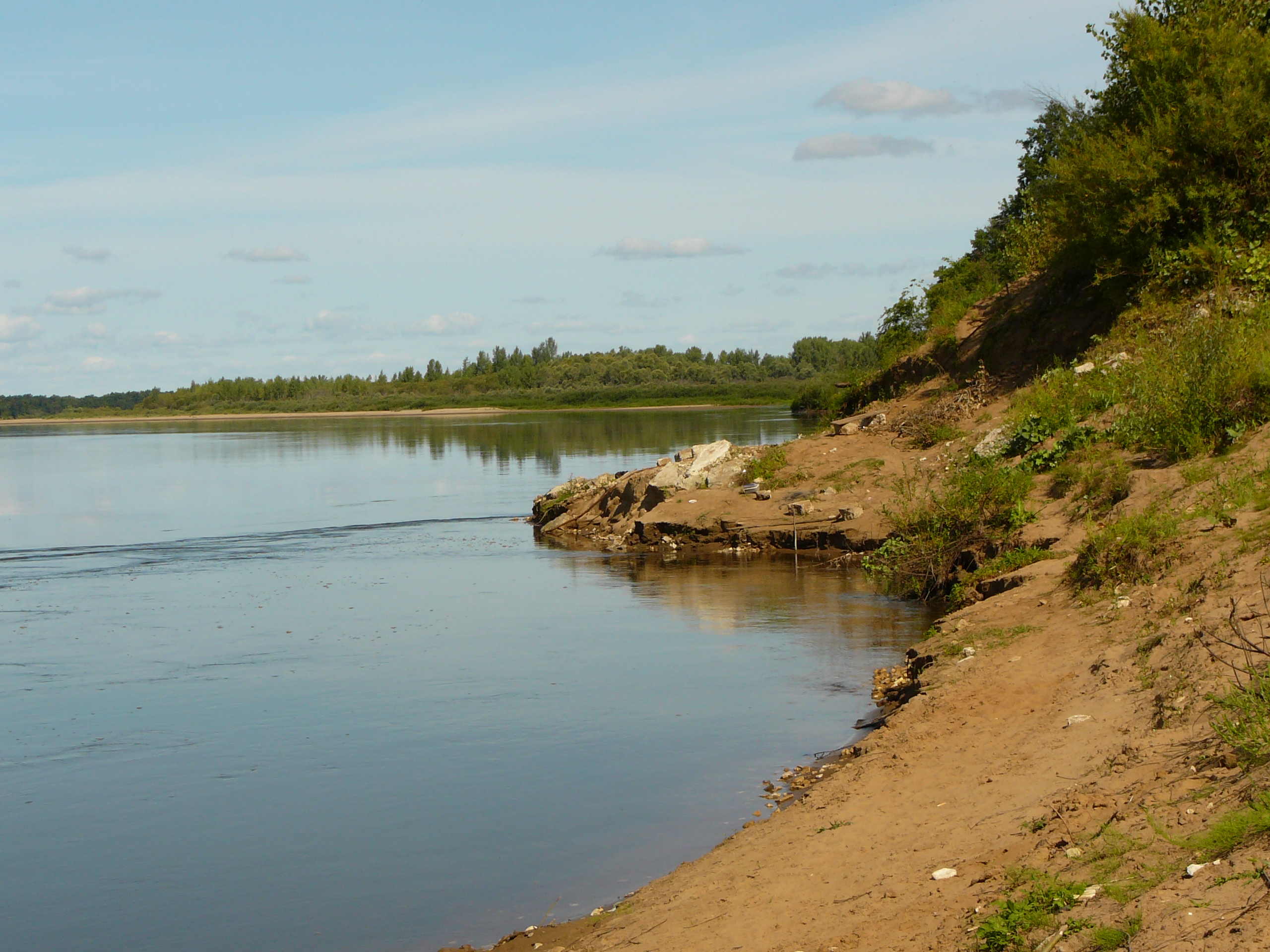
- Banks of Vyatka River, Malmyzhsky District

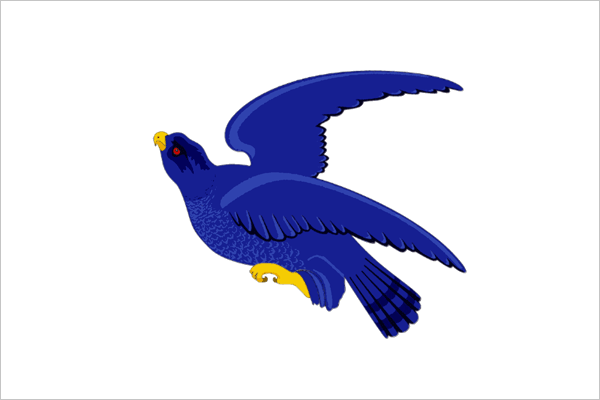
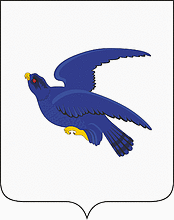
- Flag Coat of arms
- Location of Malmyzhsky District in Kirov Oblast
- Coordinates: 56°31′N 50°40′E
- Country: Russia
- Federal subject: Kirov Oblast
- Established: 29 July 1929
- Administrative center: Malmyzh

Area
  - Total: 2,190 km^{2} (850 sq mi)

Population (2010 Census)
  - Total: 26,757
  - Density: 12.2/km^{2} (31.6/sq mi)
  - Urban: 30.9%
  - Rural: 69.1%

Administrative structure
  - Administrative divisions: 1 Towns, 17 Rural okrugs
  - Inhabited localities: 1 cities/towns, 103 rural localities

Municipal structure
  - Municipally incorporated as: Malmyzhsky Municipal District
  - Municipal divisions: 1 urban settlements, 17 rural settlements
- Time zone: UTC+3 (MSK)
- OKTMO ID: 33623000
- Website: http://malmyzh43.ru/

Malmyzhsky District (Russian: Малмыжский райо́н) is an administrative and municipal district (raion), one of the thirty-nine in Kirov Oblast, Russia. It is located in the south of the oblast. The area of the district is 2,190 square kilometers (850 sq mi). Its administrative center is the town of Malmyzh. Population: 26,757 (2010 census); 32,070 (2002 Census); 35,618 (1989 Soviet census). The population of Malmyzh accounts for 30.9% of the district's total population.
