= Ruslan Yamadayev =

Chechen warlord (1961–2008)

- Руслан Ямадаев
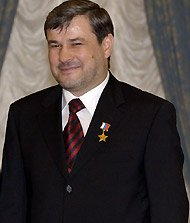
- Ruslan Yamadayev after receiving the Hero of the Russian Federation award in 2004.
- Born: 10 December 1961; Gudermes, Chechen-Ingush ASSR, USSR
- Died: 24 September 2008 (aged 46); Moscow, Russia
- Military career
- Allegiance: Chechen Republic of Ichkeria; Russian Federation
- Rank: Colonel
- Conflicts: First Chechen War; Second Chechen War
- Awards: Hero of the Nation; Hero of the Russian Federation

Ruslan (Khalid or Halid) Bekmirzayevich Yamadayev (Russian: Руслан (Халид) Бекмирзаевич Ямадаев) (10 December 1961 – 24 September 2008) was a Chechen military leader and politician. A member of the high-profile Yamadayev family, he was assassinated in Moscow in 2008. He was one of Kremlin's most loyal allies.

== Biography ==
Ruslan Yamadayev belonged to the Gudermes-based Chechen Benoi teip. Along with his brothers Sulim Yamadayev and Dzhabrail Yamadayev, he fought against the Russian forces during the First Chechen War before turning to Russia's side in 1999.

For his struggle against the separatists in the Second Chechen War, Yamadayev was promoted to the rank of colonel and granted the title of Hero of the Russian Federation. From 2003 to 2007, he was a deputy to the State Duma from Chechnya. In 2004, he was nominated for the Chechen presidency. He and his brothers ran several businesses, including a car market, a construction company, and a concrete factory, in Chechnya.

== Murder ==
On 24 September 2008, Ruslan Yamadayev was assassinated on Smolenskaya Embankment in central Moscow near the Russian White House when returning from a meeting in the Kremlin. He was shot ten times while sitting in a car owned by his brother Sulim Yamadayev. Initially, it was reported the name of the victim as Sulim, which was corrected later. The other victim of the shooting, the former military commandant of Chechnya and retired Colonel General Sergei Kizyun, was hospitalized in grave condition. The Russian police launched a criminal case on charges of murder and attempted murder.

The pro-Moscow president of Chechnya Ramzan Kadyrov who had, in the months prior to the assassination, engaged in a bitter rivalry with the Yamadayevs denied accusations of being behind the killing, and suggested that he fell victim of a blood feud. Sulim Yamadayev also accused Kadyrov and promised to take revenge. He also denied the Kadyrov's claims, saying that his brother did not have any blood feud or business clashes that could have caused his assassination.

== Aftermath ==
Sulim himself was reported killed on 29 March 2009 in Dubai.

In April 2009, a court in Moscow convicted two Chechens of the assassination of Yamadayev. Aslanbek Dadayev, Yamadayev's murderer, was sentenced to 20 years' imprisonment and Elimpasha Khatsuev, who drove the car, was sentenced to 15 years in prison.

== See also ==
- List of Heroes of the Russian Federation
- Movladi Baisarov
