= Dzhabrail Yamadayev =

Chechen warlord

Dzhabrail Bekmirzayevich Yamadaev
- Yamadayev posing with a handgun
- Born: 16 June 1970; Gudermes, Chechen-Ingush ASSR, Russian SFSR, USSR
- Died: 5 March 2003 (aged 32); Dyshne-Vedeno, Chechnya
- Military career
- Allegiance: Chechen Republic of Ichkeria; Russia (1999–2003)
- Branch: GRU
- Rank: Brigadier general (Ichkeria)
- Commands: Special Company Vostok
- Conflicts: First Chechen War (separatist side); Second Chechen War (unionist side)
- Awards: Hero of the Russian Federation

Dzhabrail Bekmirzayevich Yamadayev (16 June 1970 – 5 March 2003) was a Chechen rebel field commander during the First Chechen War. He switched sides together with his brothers, Ruslan and Sulim in 1999 during the outbreak of the Second Chechen War and then became the commander of the Russian special forces unit Vostok. Yamadayev was assassinated by a bomb blast in March 2003.

== Biography ==
During the First Chechen War the five Yamadayev brothers fought against the Russian troops and enjoyed great influence as field commanders. Dzhabrail held the rank of brigadier general in the separatist forces of Chechen Republic of Ichkeria.

When the second war in Chechnya broke out in 1999, the Yamadayevs (including Dzhabrail, Sulim and Ruslan) voluntarily defected to Moscow's side. Since then, Dzhabrail became a prominent supporter of Akhmad Kadyrov, leading an elite special force with a core of several dozen former National Guards of ChRI, then a company-sized local special unit directly answerable to the General Staff of the Russian Army.

He also held the position of deputy military commandant of Chechnya. The guerrillas nicknamed him "Dzhaba", meaning "bullfrog" in Russian.

== Assassination ==
On 5 March 2003, Dzhabrail Yamadayev was killed along with three of his bodyguards in his own house in the village of Dyshne-Vedeno by a bomb planted under a couch that he slept on after returning from a two-day operation in the mountains. The explosion was so powerful that the house was almost completely destroyed. President of Russia Vladimir Putin awarded Dzhabrail a posthumous medal and title of the Hero of the Russian Federation, while Dzabrail's brother Sulim took over his command (which in the fall of 2003 was upgraded to a spetsnaz battalion Vostok subordinated to GRU, the Russian military intelligence).

According to the 2006 statement by the rebel leader Abdul-Halim Sadulayev, pro-Moscow Chechen leader Ramzan Kadyrov and his father Akhmad were behind the killing of Dzhabrail Yamadayev, and his brother Sulim later killed four of Dzhabrail's personal bodyguards who were involved in his murder. In May 2008, remains belonging to Vakharsolt Zakayev, a former Vostok officer (platoon leader) who had disappeared about six months after that incident and was assumed to have been executed by his colleagues on suspicion in taking part in assassination, were found in the outskirts of Gudermes.

== See also ==
- List of Heroes of the Russian Federation
- Ruslan Yamadayev
- Sulim Yamadayev
