= Said-Magomed Kakiyev =

Russian colonel (born 1970)

Said-Magomed Shamaevich Kakiyev
- Born: 22 February 1970 (age 56); Ken-Yurt, Nadterechny District, Chechen-Ingush ASSR, Russian SFSR, USSR
- Military career
- Allegiance: USSR; Russia
- Branch: Spetsnaz GRU (direct subordination)
- Service years: 1989–2007
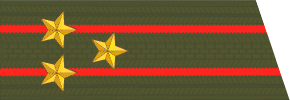
- Rank: Colonel
- Commands: Special Battalion Zapad
- Conflicts: First Nagorno-Karabakh War; Battle of Grozny (November 1994): First Chechen War; Battle of Grozny (1994–1995); Battle of Grozny (August 1996); Second Chechen War; Battle of Grozny (1999–2000); Battle of Komsomolskoye
- Awards: Hero of the Russian Federation; Order of Courage (2); Honorary weapons (2)

Said-Magomed Shamaevich Kakiyev (Russian: Саид-Магомед Шамаевич Какиев, also spelled Kakiev; born 22 February 1970) is a colonel in the Russian Army, who was the leader of the GRU Spetsnaz Special Battalion Zapad ("West"), a Chechen military force, from 2003 to 2007. Inside Chechnya his men were sometimes referred to as the Kakievtsy. Unlike the other Chechen pro-Moscow forces in Chechnya, Kakiyev and his men are not former rebels and during the First Chechen War were some of the few Chechen militants who fought on the Russian side.

Kakiyev has been declared a Hero of the Russian Federation, has twice received the Order of Courage and was awarded two specially engraved guns by the Russian Minister of Defense. He had been engaged in power struggles for overall military authority with the president of Chechnya Ramzan Kadyrov and the commander of the Special Battalion Vostok ("East") Sulim Yamadayev. In 2007, having left the post of battalion commander, he was appointed deputy military commissar of Chechnya for military-patriotic education of youth.

== Before the First Chechen War ==
Said-Magomed Kakiyev was born on 22 February 1970 in the village of Ken-Yurt, Nadterechny District, Checheno-Ingush Autonomous Soviet Socialist Republic. He belongs to the teip Zandakhoy. After he finished a Grozny vocational school in 1989 he went to serve in the Soviet Army from 1989 to 1991 in a reconnaissance battalion of the Transcaucasian Military District. He was assigned to Nagorno-Karabakh where he witnessed at first hand the devastating aftermath of the Soviet Union collapse. In the First Nagorno-Karabakh War, he acquired the rank of Major.

He came home to a Chechnya in turmoil. Dzhokhar Dudayev had started a rebellion against Soviet, later Russian rule, but the northern part of Chechnya where Kakiyev hailed from was not so enthusiastic about the secession. After allegedly witnessing atrocities, Kakiyev joined the opposition against Dudaev. In 1992, he organized a militia unit on the territory of the Nadterechny District, then headed by Umar Avturkhanov, leader of the anti-Dudayev coalition. In 1993 he was seriously hurt when his grenade launcher exploded during an assassination attempt on Dudayev. He lost his left hand, an eye, and his nose and had to have his face reconstructed beyond recognition at a hospital in Moscow.

In 1994, Said-Magomed returned to Chechnya to fight on the federal side in the increasingly heated conflict. In November 1994, he participated in the failed assault on Grozny by the Chechen opposition to Dudayev. Kakiev's detachment managed to seize the building of the republican television center, but then they had to retreat, with the detachment losing 80 people while breaking through.

== First Chechen War ==
At the beginning of the First Chechen War, in January 1995, Kakiyev took part in the storming of Grozny by the federal forces. The most formative event in his life was the Dagestanskaya Street massacre on 6 August 1996 during the separatists retaking of Grozny, when 30 pro-federal fighters and militia officers defending the city mayor's office were shot and killed despite promises of free passage through the city. Kakiyev alone managed to escape. Kakiyev has consistently blamed Doku Umarov and Ruslan Gelayev for the Dagestanskaya massacre.

== Between the wars ==
At the end of 1996, Aslan Maskhadov declared Kakiyev an outlaw and put a price on his head: whoever killed him would receive the title of Hero of Ichkeria. Kakiyev had to take his relatives into hiding in his birth village Ken-Yurt, which has never been under separatist control, and live in Moscow for almost three years. During this time he studied at the Tax Police Academy in Moscow. (He also earlier briefly studied at Alma Ata University through distance learning.) Then he moved to Rostov and enlisted as a contractor in the 22nd brigade of the Russian Ministry of Defense. According to some sources during this time he performing GRU duties in Ingushetia and Dagestan.

== Battle phase of the Second Chechen War ==
When in September 1999, the Russian army entered Chechnya after the Chechen incursion in Dagestan and the Russian apartment bombings, Said was able to return to Northern Chechnya. He was appointed deputy head of the Nadterechny district administration. In December 1999 he joined the Russian army. With some of his fellow anti-Maskhadov rebels, he formed a special-purpose company of the 42nd motorized rifle division of the Russian army (the first Chechen unit on the Russian side in the Second Chechen War) and entered Grozny. Kakiyev claimed his unit was the first to hoist the Russian flag in Grozny. During the March 2000 Battle of Komsomolskoye, forces commanded by Kakiyev managed to surround forces commanded by Ruslan Gelayev.

== Insurgency phase of the Second Chechen War ==
On 14 October 2002, by a presidential decree, Kakiev was awarded the title of Hero of Russia "for courage and heroism shown in the performance of military duty in the North Caucasus region."

On 9 September 2003, his APC was blown up by a bomb laid by Gelayev militants. A cousin of Said-Magomed was killed, 15 people were injured, including Kakiev himself (25 bomb fragments had hit him). Kakiyev was involved in hunting down Gelayev during the winter of 2003–2004, the operation which resulted in Gelayev's death.

After the active phase of the war, Kakiyev was the leader of the GRU Spetsnaz Special Battalion Zapad ("West"), reorganized from his special-purpose company, from November 2003 to 2007. Zapad, unlike other pro-Moscow factions, did not include former rebels.

Disliking the Kadyrov clan, he supported Hussein Jabrailov, Akhmad Kadyrov opponent, during the 2003 President of Chechnya election campaign.

Kakiyev, who became a devout Sufi Muslim after his two escapes from death, was believed to be one of the more effective and disciplined of Grozny's commanders, and resented any suggestion of subordination to Ramzan Kadyrov or Sulim Yamadayev, themselves both powerful commanders loyal to Grozny. In interviews, he went so far as to put the Kremlin policy of amnesty for all defecting rebels into question.

After he left the command of Zapad, at the end of 2007 he was appointed deputy military commissar of Chechnya for military-patriotic education of youth.

== See also ==
- List of Heroes of the Russian Federation
