= Battle of Grozny (March 1996) =

3rd Grozny

Second Battle of Grozny
- Part of the First Chechen War
Date	March 6–10 1996
Location	Grozny, Chechnya 43.31°N 45.69°E
Result	Chechen strategic operational success & retreat

Belligerents
Russia	Chechen Republic of Ichkeria

Commanders and leaders
Vyacheslav Tikhomirov; Vyacheslav Ovchinikov	Dzokhar Dudayev; Aslan Maskhadov; Shamil Basayev; Ruslan Gelayev; Aslanbek Ismailov; Magomed Khanbiev

Strength
Unknown	Russian military: 150 to 1,500 fighters Unofficial data: 130–150 fighters

Casualties and losses
Official figure: 110–200 soldiers killed Hundreds wounded Unknown missing	Russian claim: 190 fighters killed

The Third Battle of Grozny, also known as Operation Retribution, was a three-day surprise attack by Chechen fighters who stormed the capital city of Grozny that was occupied by Russian Armed Forces.

== Background ==
By June 1995 the Chechens had lost all the major cities and towns. On General Aslan Maskhadov's orders, the Chechen resistance shifted from conventional warfare to guerrilla warfare, relying on the mountains.

== Battle ==
On March 6, 1996, Chechen fighters launched a surprise attack on Grozny, striking from three directions and encircling outlying Russian posts and local pro-Moscow Chechen police stations, catching Russian troops off guard, inflicting significant losses, overrunning much of it and capturing weapons and ammunition stores. The attack was supposedly intended to show that the Chechens could still operate against Russian forces.

== Aftermath ==
Three days later, after the Chechens left the city, fighting in the Grozny continued for several more days; the Russian units that entered Grozny periodically engaged in battle with one another, mistaking each other for the enemy.

President Dzokhar Dudayev allegedly called the attack a "little harassing operation". The attack was only a rehearsal for a much larger operation that took place in August 1996.

== See also ==
- Battle of Grozny (disambiguation)
- Battle of Grozny (August 1996)

== Sources ==
- "HEAVY FIGHTING ERUPTS IN GROZNY". Radio Free Europe/Radio Liberty.
- Specter, Michael (March 7, 1996). "Rebels Burst Into Chechen Capital, Retaking Part of City". The New York Times.
- https://reliefweb.int/report/russian-federation/chechnya-russian-federation-situation-report-1-february-14-march-1996
