= Vyacheslav Tikhomirov =

Russian military officer (1945–2014)

- Вячеслав Тихомиров
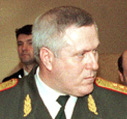
- Tikhomirov in 2000

Commander-in-Chief of the Internal Troops of Russia
- In office 22 January 2000 – 19 July 2004
- Preceded by: Vyacheslav Ovchinnikov
- Succeeded by: Nikolai Rogozhkin

Personal details
- Born: 8 March 1945 Michurinsk, Soviet Union
- Died: 3 December 2014 Moscow, Russia
- Resting place: Troyekurovskoye Cemetery
- Education: Tashkent Higher All-Arms Command School; Frunze Military Academy; General Staff Military Academy

Military service
- Allegiance: Soviet Union; Russia
- Branch/service: Soviet Armed Forces; Russian Armed Forces Internal Troops
- Years of service: 1963–2005
- Rank: Army general
- Commands: Internal Troops of Russia; Ural Military District
- Battles/wars: Transnistria War; First Chechen War; Second Chechen War

Vyacheslav Valentinovich Tikhomirov (Russian: Вячеслав Валентинович Тихомиров; March 8, 1945, Michurinsk, Tambov Oblast – December 3, 2014, Moscow) was a Soviet and Russian military officer who served as Deputy Minister of Internal Affairs and Commander-in-Chief of the Internal Troops of Russia. He held the rank of General of the Army.

== Biography ==
He was born in the city of Michurinsk Tambov Oblast, RSFSR. He graduated from 10th grade in the evening school for working youth in 1963 and at the same time Railway School No. 3 in Michurinsk.

He was conscripted to the Soviet Armed Forces in August 1963. He graduated from the Tashkent Higher All-Arms Command School (1967), the Frunze Military Academy (1979), the Voroshilov Military Academy of the General Staff (1988).

Served in the motorized rifle troops as a platoon commander of the Guards Motorized Rifle Regiment, from 1971 as a company commander in the Group of Soviet Forces in Germany. From 1973 to 1976 he served as commander of a motorized rifle company, chief of staff and commander of a motorized rifle battalion in the Odessa Military District. From 1979 he served in the Transbaikal Military District and commander of a training motorized rifle regiment, from 1982 he served as deputy commander of a motorized rifle division. Then until 1986 he was deputy commander of a motorized rifle division in the Transcaucasian Military District. He took part in the liquidation of the consequences of the disaster at the Chernobyl Nuclear Power Plant. From 1988 he served as commander of a tank division in the Central Group of Forces on the territory of Czechoslovakia, carried out its withdrawal to its homeland in the Moscow Military District.

Since March 1992, he served as chief of staff and first deputy commander of the 14th Guards Combined Arms Army, stationed in Transnistria, an unrecognized breakaway region of Moldova. The army's units were at the center of the Transnistria conflict at that time. He was the closest assistant to the army commander General Alexander Lebed.

In May 1995, he was appointed deputy commander of the North Caucasus Military District for combat training, being responsible for conducting military operations in Chechnya during the First Chechen War. In October 1995, he was appointed commander of the troops of the Ministry of Defence as part of the United Group of Forces in Chechnya. From January to December 1996, he was commander of the United Group of Forces in Chechnya. According to the memoirs of Novaya Gazeta military observer Vyacheslav Izmailov, when Tikhomirov was informed of this by telephone, he threw his general's cap on the floor in anger, since he did not want this appointment. During 1996, the group's troops were subjected to several powerful attacks by Chechen separatists, suffering significant losses (for example, the militants' breakthrough into Grozny in March 1996 and the defeat of a military column in April 1996). In August 1996, significant forces of Chechen militants secretly approached Grozny and simultaneously broke into the city from different directions. Russian military, Militsiya and other units were blocked in their locations with significant losses in men and equipment, the city itself essentially came under enemy control (Operation Jihad). Tikhomirov himself was on vacation at that time, which does not relieve him of responsibility for the complete unpreparedness of the troops for such a development of the situation. After the signing of the Khasavyurt Accord, Tikhomirov tried to delay the withdrawal of Russian troops from Chechnya until a complete Prisoner exchange.

From March 1997 he served as chief of staff and First Deputy Commander of the Ural Military District. On December 30, 1999, he was appointed commander of the Ural Military District, Colonel General (15.01.2000). However, he commanded the district for less than a month. On January 22, 2000, in accordance with decree of the President of Russia Vladimir Putin, he was appointed Commander-in-Chief of the Internal Troops of the Ministry of Internal Affairs and Deputy Minister of Internal Affairs of the Russian Federation. As Vyacheslav Valentinovich himself recalled in an interview with Svetlana Sorokina in the program Hero of the Day on NTV on January 27, 2000, he was offered to become the commander of the Internal Troops of the Ministry of Internal Affairs three times. At first, this was at the level of preliminary conversations with Anatoly Kulikov, then with Sergei Stepashin, when they were ministers of the Ministry of Internal Affairs. He carried out significant work to strengthen and rearm the internal troops, proposed a plan for their reorganization which was subsequently implemented. He was in the Chechen Republic many times during the Second Chechen War. In accordance with decree of the President of Russia of November 6, 2002, he was awarded military rank of General of the Army.

On July 19, 2004, he was dismissed from his post along with the Chief of the General Staff of the Russian Armed Forces Anatoly Kvashnin and a number of other high-ranking generals. The reason for his dismissal was said to be the inaction of the internal troops during the breakthrough of Chechen militants into Ingushetia. Tikhomirov himself categorically disagreed with such accusations and, in protest, submitted a report on dismissal from military service, which was immediately satisfied. After a short period of time at the disposal of the Minister of Internal Affairs of the Russian Federation, he was dismissed on January 17, 2005 with the wording "for health reasons".

He lived in Moscow. He was married and had two children (his son was an officer who died in battle in the First Chechen War) [4]. He died on December 3, 2014. He was buried at the Troyekurovskoye Cemetery.

== Awards ==
- Order "For Merit to the Fatherland" IV degree (1996)
- Order "For Personal Courage" (1992)
- Order of Military Merit (Russia)
- Order "For Service to the Homeland in the Armed Forces of the USSR" III degree (1990)
- Honorary firearms (2000)
