= Battle of Grozny (August 1996) =

Battle during the First Chechen War

- Part of First Chechen War
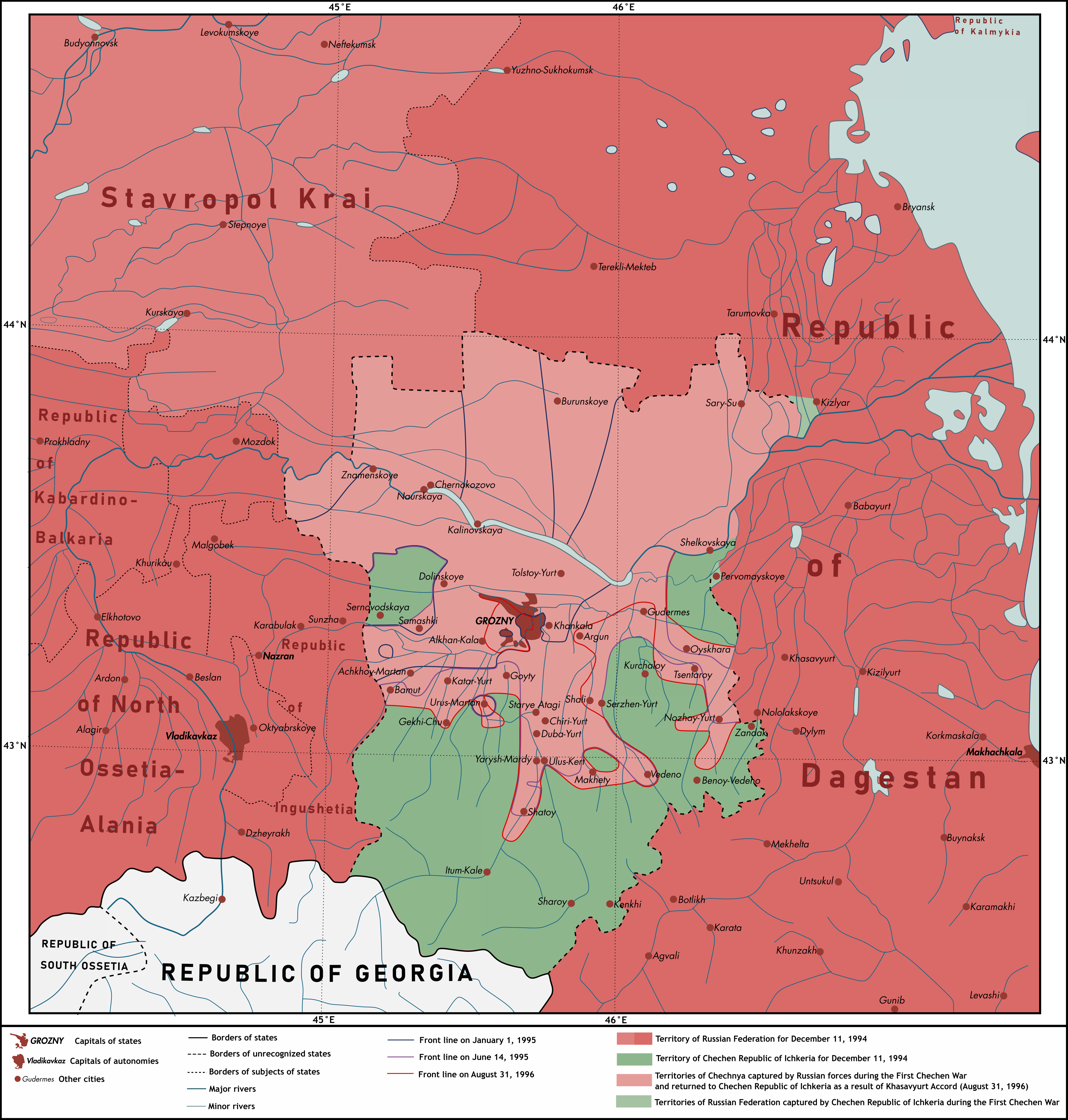
Date	August 6–20, 1996 (2 weeks)
Location	Grozny, Chechnya 43.31°N 45.69°E
Result	Chechen victory

Belligerents
Russia: Loyalist opposition	Chechen Republic of Ichkeria

Commanders and leaders
Konstantin Pulikovsky; Vyacheslav Ovchinnikov; Doku Zavgayev; Said-Magomed Kakiyev; Alu Alkhanov	Aslan Maskhadov; Shamil Basayev; Ruslan Gelayev; Doku Umarov; Akhmed Zakayev

Strength
7,000–12,000; 200 IFVs/APCs	Up to 1,500+ fighters 2 tanks, up to 10 IFVs/APCs

Casualties and losses
Russian military data: 687 soldiers killed 1,407 wounded 18 tanks destroyed 69 IFVs/APCs destroyed 4 helicopters destroyed	Unknown
- est. 2,000+ civilians killed

The Battle of Grozny of August 1996, also known as Operation Jihad or Operation Zero Option, when Chechen fighters regained and then kept control of Chechnya's capital Grozny in a surprise raid. Russian federal forces had captured the city in a previous battle that ended in February 1995, and subsequently posted a large garrison of federal and republican Ministry of the Interior (MVD) troops in the city.

The much smaller Chechen forces infiltrated Grozny and either routed the MVD forces or split them into many pockets of encirclement. Chechen fighters then beat back the Russian Ground Forces units that had been sent to expel the fighters and rescue their own trapped forces. The final result was a ceasefire that effectively ended the First Chechen War of 1994–1996.

== Background ==
In July 1996, the Russian leadership abandoned the uneasy peace process in Chechnya and resumed large-scale military operations. Between July 9 and July 16, 1996, Russian forces attacked Chechen bases in the foothills and mountains in the south of the Chechen Republic. On July 20, Russian forces launched a large-scale campaign to pacify the southern highlands, moving most of their combat troops there.

On August 6, the very day of the offensive, Russian forces began a major operation in the village of Alkhan-Yurt by moving 1,500 paramilitary Internal Troops and pro-Moscow Chechen policemen of Doku Zavgayev's government out of Grozny.

== Battle ==
On August 6, 1996, Chechen units attacking Grozny consisted of around 1,500 fighters. Initially, Russian media reported that only 250 fighters had entered the city. The Russian garrison inside the city consisted of some 7,000-12,000 troops. To overcome the Russian numerical superiority, Chechen chief of staff Aslan Maskhadov employed infiltration tactics. Using their intimate knowledge of the city, Chechen units entered Grozny and avoided the network of Russian checkpoints and other positions in a carefully planned and highly coordinated rapid advance before attacking or blocking targets deep in Moscow-controlled territory.

Their main objectives were the command and control assets at the military airfield at Khankala and the militarised Severny Airport (Grozny Airport), along with the headquarters of the FSB and GRU security and military intelligence services. They also blocked roads and took up strategic positions on the approaches to the city. According to Chechen commander Turpal Ali-Kaimov, 1,500 Chechen fighters infiltrated the city, of which 47 were killed during the initial attack.

The Chechen forces attacked Grozny at 6:00am on August 6 in an operation that took three hours. Rather than trying to capture or destroy all individual fortified checkpoints (blokpost), barracks, police stations, and other Russian positions, the Chechen fighters cut off, isolated and encircled most of them, mining and booby trapping all roads including the entries and exits to prevent escape or reinforcements, and waited for the government troops to surrender. By August 9, Russian news agency Interfax put the number of surrounded troops at some 7,000. In addition to MVD and FSB troops and non-combat personnel, military troops were stationed in the city.

The largest military garrison was located at the government offices in the center of the city, including the interior ministry building and the republican FSB headquarters. A group of about 10 Russian journalists were trapped in a hotel near the compound. The pro-Russian Chechen government fled to Khankala military base, just outside the capital. In another part of the city, several garrisons of Russian troops took shelter at the Municipal Hospital 9, where they held approximately 500 civilians hostage until they were allowed to evacuate.

A number of Chechens deemed to be collaborators were rounded up, detained, and executed. According to the human rights organization Memorial, reliable sources stated that the execution list for one region of Grozny comprised more than 200 names. Said-Magomed Kakiyev was the only survivor of a group of 30 Chechen OMON special police officers who were executed by the fighters of Dokka Umarov and Ruslan Gelayev after defenders at the mayor's office surrendered on August 6, reportedly on the promise of free passage.

According to Gelayev, "Zavgayev had either 15 or 18 thousand 'Chechen policemen' [in all of Chechnya], but as soon as we entered Grozny in August 1996, they all scattered and went home, then they went over to the Mujahideen, except for a few dozens of those who were guilty of shedding Chechen blood."

On August 7, a large armored column from the 205th "Cossack" Separate Motor Rifle Brigade arrived to assist the trapped Russian forces. The day before, a Chechen separatist group led by Akhmed Zakayev had captured a large supply of RPO rocket launchers by seizing Grozny's main railway station (according to the 2002 indictment by the Russian government, Zakayev's fighters killed or wounded more than 300 MVD troops at the train station); as a result, Russian tanks became much easier targets for Chechen mobile units.

On August 10, the Russians launched a counteroffensive, which achieved some success, the Minutka Square was captured from the raid, and the garrisons surrounded in some parts of the city began to assist the attackers. As a result, by August 13, a significant part of the city had been recaptured, although with heavy losses for the Russian side. As military historian Evgeny Norin notes, by August 14, the Chechens had no chance to turn the situation in their favor. At the same time, the Russians captured about 40 fighters.

The head of the International Red Cross in Grozny said that "most of the city is mined, and there's a lot of aerial bombardments." The European Union called on both sides to cease fire immediately, without effect. Russian president Boris Yeltsin declared a day of mourning for the victims in Chechnya. Battles also continued on the outskirts of the city and elsewhere in the republic.

On August 19, Russian General Kostantin Pulikovsky surrounded the city and issued an ultimatum that the Chechen fighters should leave Grozny within 48 hours or face an all-out attack. The threat resulted in mass panic among the remaining civilian population, estimated by Human Rights Watch at 300,000. Strikes by aircraft and artillery commenced on August 20. In chaotic scenes, as the bombardment indiscriminately hit residential areas and at least one hospital, terrified refugees fled the city. Many of them were reportedly killed when their columns were hit by artillery fire. In all, about 220,000 refugees fled the city.

The number of those who remained in the city was estimated by Memorial at between 50,000 and 70,000, and males older than 11 were considered suspected fighters and not let through the Russian lines. Many refugees were also fired on at checkpoints, and Russian state television ORT journalist Ramzan Khadzhiev was shot dead by federal soldiers while trying to flee the city. Russian General Alexander Lebed managed to mostly avert further bloodshed in Grozny. Meanwhile, the Russian offensive in the southern mountains continued.

After returning to Chechnya on August 20, Lebed ordered a new ceasefire and re-opened direct talks with the Chechen leaders, aided by the Organization for Security and Co-operation in Europe (OSCE). On August 22, Russia agreed to withdraw of all its forces in Chechnya to their bases at Khankala and Severny. On August 30, 1996, Generals Lebed and Maskhadov signed the Khasav-Yurt Accord, an agreement that marked the end of the First Chechen War.

== Aftermath ==
The Khasav-Yurt Accord paved the way for the signing of two further agreements between Russia and Chechnya. In mid-November 1996, Boris Yeltsin and Aslan Maskhadov signed an agreement on economic relations and reparations to Chechens who had been affected by the 1994–96 war. On May 12, 1997, Presidents Maskhadov and Yeltsin signed the Russian–Chechen Peace Treaty, calling for "peace and the principles of Russian-Chechen relations." The incursion into Dagestan in the summer of 1999, however, led to a breach of these treaties and the start of the Second Chechen War.

In 2000, Pavel Felgenhauer commented: "In 1996, Russian generals insisted that they could 'liberate' Grozny only by totally destroying the city with massive heavy gun and aerial bombardments, but such an indiscriminate attack was not approved by the Kremlin. In 1996, the Russian public, military and political elite were fed up and opted to withdraw Russian troops. Anyway, the destruction of Grozny in August 1996 was hardly a reasonable option: Thousands of MVD troops were trapped in the city and most likely would have perished together with the Chechens. Today heavy bombs and guns are used against Chechen towns and villages without limitations."

The Russian defeat in the battle was considered Russia's "worst military defeat since the disasters of the Nazi invasion in 1941"

== See also ==
- Battle of Grozny (disambiguation)

== Sources ==
- Norin, Yevgeny (2025). Чеченская война [Chechen War] (in Russian). Vol. 1: 1994-1996. Moscow: Chernaya Sotnya.
- Bennett, Vanora (August 22, 1996). "Lebed Seeks to Avert Slaughter Of Civilians in Chechen Conflict". Los Angeles Times. Archived from the original on May 31, 2012.
- Bunker, Robert (2003). Non-State Threats and Future Wars. London: Frank Cass.
- "Chechen peace talks may resume; But civilian casualties mount in intensified fighting". CNN. July 22, 1996. Archived from the original on May 4, 2008.
- "Civilians flee besieged Chechen capital". CNN. August 11, 1996. Archived from the original on May 3, 2008.
- Evangelista, Matthew (2002). The Chechen Wars: Will Russia Go the Way of the Soviet Union?. Washington, D.C.: Brookings Institution Press. ISBN 0-8157-2498-5.
- Felgenhauer, Pavel (March–April 2000). "Russia's Forces Unreconstructed". Institute for the Study of Conflict, Ideology, and Policy. X (4). Boston University.
- "Fighting rages on in Chechnya; Situation said to be 'totally out of control'". CNN. August 9, 1996. Archived from the original on March 22, 2003.
- Knezys, Stasys; Sedlickas, Romanas (1999). The War in Chechnya. College Station, TX: Texas A&M University Press. ISBN 9780890968567.
- Orlov, Oleg Petrovich; Cherkasov, Aleksandr (1997). Behind Their Backs: Russian Forces' Use of Civilians as Hostages and Human Shields During the Chechnya War. Moscow: "Memorial" Human Rights Center. ISBN 978-5-88255-022-5.
- Orlov, Oleg Petrovich; Cherkasov, Aleksandr; Sokolov, A. V. "The Violation of Human Rights and Norms of Humanitarian Law in the Course of the Armed Conflict in the Chechen Republic". "Memorial" Human Rights Center. Archived from the original on December 15, 2016.
- "Prosecutor details accusations against Zakaev". RFE/RL Newsline. Hellenic Resources Network. November 5, 2002. Archived from the original on March 3, 2016.
- "Rebel attack on Grozny intensifies". CNN. August 7, 1996. Archived from the original on May 3, 2008.
- "Residents flee in panic as Grozny becomes a battleground". CNN. August 11, 1996. Archived from the original on June 18, 2002.
- "The Russian Federation: Human Rights Developments". World Report 1997. Human Rights Watch. 1997.
- Specter, Michael (August 14, 1996). "Risky Walk in Rebel-Held Chechen Capital". The New York Times.
- van der Laan, Nanette; Gedye, Robin (August 22, 1996). "Lebed calls off assault on Grozny". The Daily Telegraph. Archived from the original on November 20, 2002.
- "Yeltsin, Maskhadov sign peace agreement". RFE/RL Newsline. Friends & Partners. May 12, 1997. Archived from the original on November 17, 2015.
