= Tsuntinsky Clashes =

2003 conflicts in Chechnya, Russia

Tsuntisky Clashes
- Part of the Second Chechen War
Date	15 December 2003 – 28 February 2004
Location	Tsumadinsky District, Dagestan, Russia
Result	Russian Victory: Chechen units destroyed

Belligerents
Russia	(Chechen Republic of Ichkeria) Chechnya

Commanders and leaders
(Russia) Radim Khalikov † (Russia) Vladimir Streltsov	(Chechen Republic of Ichkeria) Ruslan Gelayev †

Units involved
(Russia) Russian Armed Forces	(Chechen Republic of Ichkeria) Chechen Militants

Strength
(Russia) Unknown	(Chechen Republic of Ichkeria) 36

Casualties and losses
(Russia) 15 Killed	(Chechen Republic of Ichkeria) 20–30 Killed

Clashes in the Tsuntinsky region also known as Operation Uragan-1 were a series of conflicts after the penetration of 36 militants from Chechnya on December 15, 2003 led by Ruslan Gelayev, which ended with the destruction of most of them, and a little later and with the death of Gelayev himself.

== The Attack ==
The goal of the militants was to cross the Chechen-Dagestan border unnoticed, and then the Russian-Georgian border in order to spend the winter in the Panki Gorge. A detachment of militants crossed the Chechen-Dagestan border, passed through the Tsumadinsky District in Dagestan and on the night of December 15 entered Tsumadinsky District to the village of Shauri, from which two roads lead to Georgia - through Opar and Butsi-Batsi. Kistijan was supposed to meet them in Shaura, but he didn't show up. Then the militants decided to spend the night there and return to Chechnya in the morning. According to the report of the local residents, the alarm group of the border guard "Mokok" under the command of its commander, Captain Radim Halikov was deployed on GAZ-66 vehicles. Gelaev, setting an example to his soldiers, went out on the road himself and opened fire from the machine gun of Degtyarëv on the outpost with the border guards wounding the border guards, Gelaev also shot his own soldier, who refused to do so: "The tenth victim of this battle was a young Avar fighter. Gelaev gave him a pike-knife and told him to cut off the head of a countryman - the wounded commander border, Captain Radim Khalikov. The fighter refused. ...". After this, the fighters rushed to the village of Shauri. In the morning, the bandits held hostage 11 inhabitants of the villages of Shauri and Galatli in the Cuntin district. Then, releasing the hostages, they split into several groups and entered the mountains.

== Russian Response ==
In the Cuntin district, an unusual situation was announced, for the elimination of militants and the release of hostages, plans "Hurricane-1" and "Hurricane-2" were put into action. To the scene of the incident, additional forces were urgently deployed from neighboring districts, including 35 militiamen and 290 OMON fighters. Representatives of the republic's law enforcement agencies began to lead the operation. Top officials of the Russian intelligence services and army, including the commander of the local department of the border service of the FSB of the Russian Federation, Vladimir Streltsov, was also sent to Dagestan. From the very beginning, federal troops adhered to non-contact combat tactics, using aircraft and artillery. On December 24, in the area of the high-mountain villages of Garbutl, Nakhada and Gunzib, Tsuntinsky district, several groups of militants were blocked. Missile and bomb attacks were carried out on the militants trapped in the Gorge. On December 27, three servicemen, while chasing militants, fell into an abyss near the village of Mikali, Tsuntinsky district.

== Aftermath ==
The main accomplishment was the death of Ruslan Gelayev on February 28, 2004, after his clash with two Dagestan border guards. In total, during the entire operation, 5 militants were captured, and the remnants of the gang were destroyed. Some of the militants were detained on the territory of neighboring Georgia by Georgian special services and subsequently handed over to the Russian side. According to Russian media, the militants lost 20-30 people killed, while the federal troops suffered 15 dead: 9 border guards killed by militants, 1 machine gunner shot by a Chechen sniper, 3 GRU special forces soldiers who fell into the abyss and 2 border guards killed in a shootout with Gelayev. The magazine “Soldier of Fortune” in No. 3 for 2005 (article “They stopped the Beast”) talks about many frostbitten conscripts of the North Caucasian Military District and riot policemen of the Republic of Dagestan who fell into the abyss.
