= Battle of Grozny (1994–1995) =

Battle of the First Chechen War

First Battle of Grozny
- Part of First Chechen War
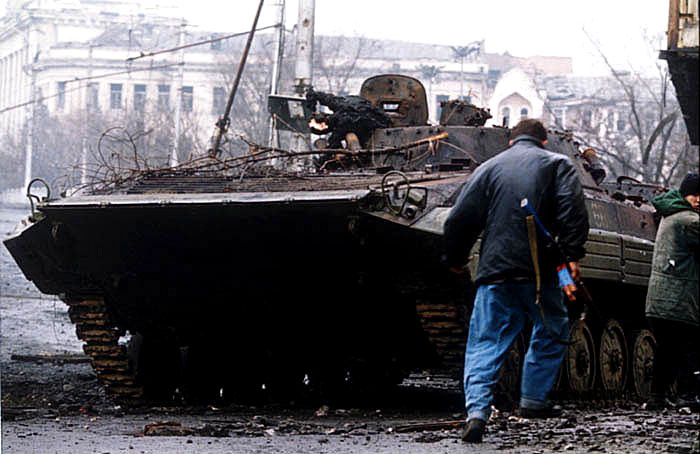
- Two Chechen militia fighters take cover behind a burned-out Russian BMP-2 armoured vehicle
Date	22 December 1994 – 6 March 1995 (3 months and 2 weeks)
Location	Grozny, Chechnya, Russia 43°19′N 45°43′E
Result	Russian victory
Territorial changes	Capture of eastern and northern Chechnya by the Russian federal forces

Belligerents
Russia	Chechen Republic of Ichkeria; UNA-UNSO

Commanders and leaders
Pavel Grachev; Ivan Babichev; Anatoly Kvashnin; Konstantin Pulikovsky; Lev Rokhlin; Vladimir Shamanov; Viktor Vorobyov †; Ivan A. Savin †	Dzhokhar Dudayev; Aslan Maskhadov; Shamil Basayev; Turpal-Ali Atgeriyev; Ruslan Gelayev; Salman Raduyev; Akhmed Zakayev; Apti Tokayev †; Ali Adayev †; Oleksandr Muzychko

Strength
15,000 or 40,000–60,000	1,000+ (2,500 according to one estimate); Per Russian Military: 12,000 fighters

Casualties and losses
Western estimate: 5,000+ soldiers killed Per Russia: 1,834 soldiers killed 4,670 wounded 96 captured (official figure); 62 tanks destroyed 163 other armored vehicles destroyed	Western estimate: low thousands killed (overall Grozny fighting period); Chechen sources: several hundred killed in the initial defence of Grozny (wartime claims) Russian claim: 6,000+ killed (overall Chechen losses in Grozny/early campaign period)
- >25,000+ civilians killed, including 5,000 children (estimated)

The First Battle of Grozny was the Russian Army's invasion and subsequent conquest of the Chechen capital, Grozny, during the early months of the First Chechen War. The attack would last from December 1994 to March 1995, which resulted in the military occupation of the city by the Russian Army and rallied most of the Chechen nation around the government of Dzhokhar Dudayev.

The initial assault resulted in considerable Russian casualties and demoralization in the Russian forces. It took another two months of heavy fighting, and a change in tactics, before the Russian Army was able to capture Grozny. The battle caused enormous destruction and casualties amongst the civilian population and saw the heaviest bombing campaign in Europe since the end of World War II.

== Tactics ==
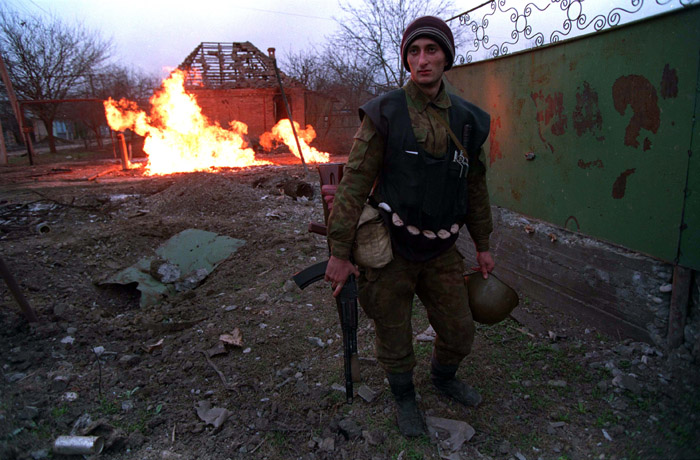
A Chechen fighter during the Battle of Grozny, January 1995

Chechen units were organized into combat groups, typically composed of around twenty personnel, further divided into three- or four-person fire teams. Each fire team consisted of an anti-tank gunner armed with Russian-made RPG-7s or RPG-18s, a machine gunner, and a rifleman. To effectively engage Russian armored vehicles in Grozny, multiple hunter-killer fire teams coordinated their actions on the ground level, as well as in second and third-story positions and basements. Snipers and machine gunners provided suppressive fire on the supporting infantry, while the anti-tank gunners engaged any armored vehicles.

The majority of Chechen fighters were irregulars and militia members who operated under the command of their respective leaders, often warlords. This arrangement complicated effective battle coordination for Colonel Aslan Maskhadov, Grozny's Chief of Staff. The Chechen forces, which included foreign volunteers, among them a group of Ukrainian nationalists, had limited access to heavy weapons. They possessed only a small number of T-62 and T-72 tanks, with the bulk of heavy weaponry being utilized by regular forces.

During the initial stages of the conflict, the Russian forces were taken by surprise as they encountered fierce resistance from Chechen combat groups. The armored columns, originally intended to swiftly seize the city, found themselves in a devastating battle reminiscent of the historic Battle of Budapest in late 1944. To address the immediate challenges, the Russian military implemented a short-term strategy by deploying self-propelled anti-aircraft guns such as the ZSU-23-4 and 9K22 Tunguska. These anti-aircraft guns were utilized due to the limitations of the tanks' main guns, which were unable to elevate or depress sufficiently to effectively engage the Chechen fire teams. Furthermore, the machine guns mounted on the armored vehicles proved inadequate in suppressing the simultaneous firepower unleashed by multiple fire teams. As a result, the Russian forces had to adapt their tactics to counter the determined and coordinated resistance put forth by the Chechen fighters.

Subsequently, the Russian forces implemented a strategy that involved reinforcing their infantry presence for a meticulous house-to-house advance within the city. Dismounted Russian infantry provided support to the armored units throughout the operation. To gain an advantage, the Russians strategically positioned themselves at ambush points and lured the Chechen fighters into carefully orchestrated traps by moving their armored vehicles towards them. In a similar fashion to Soviet tank crews during the Battle in Berlin in 1945, some of the Russian armored vehicles were equipped with 'field-expedient' cages made of wire mesh. These improvised structures were mounted approximately 30 centimeters away from the hull armor, aiming to counteract the shaped charges employed by the Chechen RPGs, and provide an additional layer of protection. Russian forces proportionally lost more tanks during the battle than they did during the Battle of Berlin in 1945.

== Battle ==
=== Air and artillery bombings ===
On 22 December 1994, at 5 am, the shelling of Grozny began, but only on 24 December did the Russian troops begin to drop leaflets from airplanes with explanations for the population. During these shelling and bombings, according to some reports (the Memorial Society, human rights activist S. Kovalev), several thousand civilians died and were injured. Aviation began the assault from the airfields of Yeysk, Krymsk, Mozdok and Budyonnovsk. Due to adverse weather conditions, the effectiveness of aviation operations was low. Simultaneously with the start of air strikes, artillery opened fire. On the morning of 31 December, the United Group of Federal Forces entered Grozny. The so-called "New Year's assault on Grozny" began.

=== New Year's Eve assault ===
Citizens of the city woke up at 5 am Moscow Time on New Year's Eve to a Russian bombardment. Bombs and shells hit oil tanks on the western side of the city, creating heavy black smoke. The Oil Institute, in the center of the city, was also set ablaze after coming under aerial bombardment, creating more smoke. Pamphlets urging the Chechens to surrender were air-dropped. Early in December, the Russian defense minister, General Pavel Grachev boasted he could seize Grozny in two hours with just one airborne regiment. Before the battle, Grachev said:

It is not a question of an assault in the classic sense of the word. What does an assault on a city mean? It means the use of all the forces and weapons in the country's arsenal. It primarily means heavy rocket preparation lasting several hours. It means heavy bombing raids on the whole city with the aim of disabling 60% of the defenders and de-moralizing the rest.

==== Plan and composition of the Russian Federal Forces ====
The plan for the Russian Federal Forces—invade the city in three columns: "Northern group", "Western group", and "Eastern group".

Because of unexpected heavy and mobile resistance of the Chechens, this was modified to Russian Federal Forces attacking in four columns:

- "Group North" (Север) – commanded by General Konstantin Pulikovsky

Staging area – in the foothills 3–5 km beyond "Severny" (northern) airfield on the northern outskirts of Grozny
Objective – "Severny" airfield and Maskhadov's "Presidential Palace"
Approach route – Altayskaya street to Staropromishlovskoye highway to Mayakovskogo street (for 131st MR Br); Khmel'nitzkogo to Pervomayskaya to Ordzhonikidze streets (81st Gd MR Regt.), with the two units converging in the Palace/Railway station area of the east Zavodskoy Rayon (Industrial Suburb)

81st Guards Motor-Rifle Petrokov Regiment (1st and 2nd battalions, Guards Subcolonels Perepelkin and Shilovsky commanding), 90th Guards Tank Division (Commander Colonel Yaroslavetz, Chief of Staff Colonel Burlakov)

3rd battalion, 6th Guards Tank Regiment, Commander Guards Major Zakhryapin

7th tank company – Commander Guards Senior Lieutenant Kovdrya
8th tank company – Commander Guards Captain Vechkanov
9th tank company – Commander Guards Captain Batretdinov

Personnel and equipment: 157 officers and 1,174 enlisted personnel, 96 BMPs, 2 BREM-1 recovery vehicles, 4 pontoon vehicles, 5 BRM-1Ks, 4 BRDM-2s, 31 T-80BV tanks, 4 Tunguska SP AA vehicles, and 24 guns. With the invasion of Afghanistan, the regiment was at half-strength, and lacked riflemen. One third of their officers and half of enlisted personnel were reserve with little training for the operation.

elements of the 131st Motor-Rifle Krasnodar Brigade (1st and 2nd battalions) (Colonel Savin)

Personnel and equipment: 1,469 officers and enlisted personnel, 42 BMPs, 20 tanks and 16 guns

276th Motor-Rifle Regiment (Colonel Bunin)

Personnel and equipment: 1,297 officers and enlisted, 73 BMPs, 31 tanks, 24 guns

- "Group West" (Запад) – commanded by General Ivan Babichev

Objectives – M-29 highway approach to the city, "Lenin Park", and Grozny Railway Central Station
Approach route – Industrialnaya street into Mayakovskogo street

693rd Motor-Rifle Regiment
503rd Motor-Rifle Regiment
237th Parachute Regiment

- "Group North-East" (Северо-Восток) – commanded by General Lev Rokhlin

Objective – Central Hospital Complex
Approach route – Petropavlovskoye highway

255th Guards Motor-Rifle Regiment
74th Independent Motor-Rifle Brigade
33rd Motor-Rifle Regiment

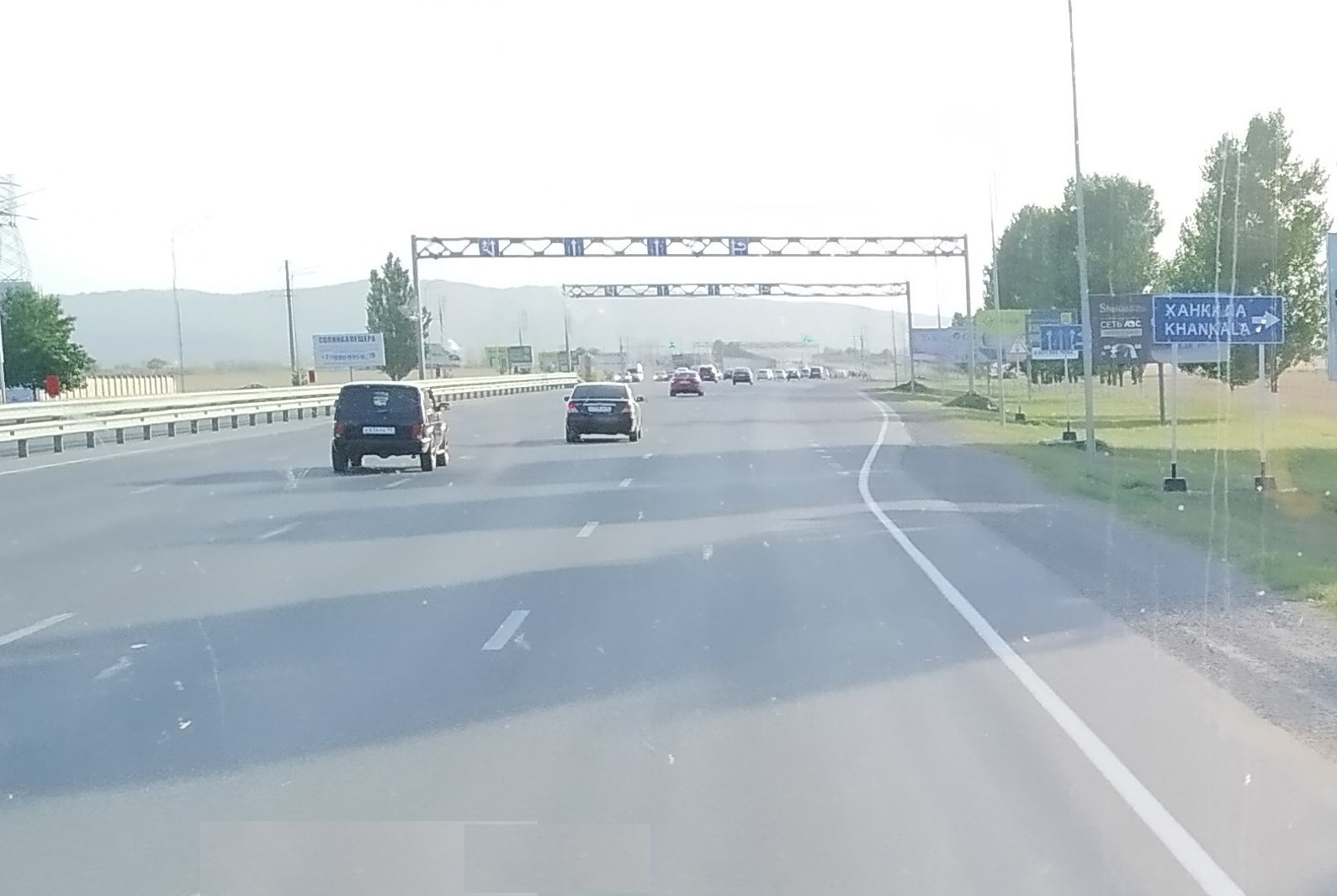
Road from Khankala ("Group East" route)

- "Group East" (Восток) – commanded by Major General Nikolai Staskov

Objectives – Grozny Airport and covering R-305/R-306 highway junctions
Approach routes – Gudermesskaya street and Khankal'skaya street

129th Guards Motor-Rifle Leningrad Regiment
133rd Guards Independent Tank Battalion
98th Guards Parachute Regiment

==== Russian advance ====
Map showing the Russian military's attack routes in Grozny

The Russian armored columns invading Grozny on 31 December 1994, were amalgamated from various army units, including untrained conscripted soldiers. The force's columns aimed to provide blunt firepower, hoping to intimidate the Chechens through the sheer scale of the armored operation. However, all armored and mechanized units were under-staffed and under-trained. Although the Russian forces enjoyed air superiority, weather kept the Russians from using their precision-guided munitions effectively. Advancing troops were supported only by Mi-24 attack helicopters, with the Group East losing five vehicles alone due to a friendly-fire incident by Russian air. The previous day, the Russian Air Force bombed nearby villagers, including those anti-Dudayev and pro-Russian. Simultaneously, Moscow made the implausible claim that Chechens blew up buildings in Grozny to simulate bomb-damage by Russian warplanes. From the ground, the assaulting troops were supported by hundreds of artillery pieces positioned on the hills near Grozny, including rocket artillery batteries such as the BM-27 Uragan and BM-21 Grad.

The Plan: Four Russian armoured columns were ordered to move in a sudden and co-ordinated attack, and, after defeating all defenders, were to meet at the Presidential Palace in the center of the city. The key to the plan was all four columns reaching the center of the city simultaneously. However, the 19th Motorized Rifle Division (MRD) was late arriving to the group West, commanded by Major General Ivan Babichev, and the bloated column could barely move, with disputed reports of friendly artillery fire. In the east, units of Major General Vadim Orlov's 104th Airborne Division did not join the 129th MRR from the Leningrad Military District after they moved on Grozny and were subsequently hit by friendly artillery fire, the 129th Regiment was badly demoralised and retreated the next day without accomplishing much. Lieutenant General Lev Rokhlin's forces of the 8th Corps from the city of Volgograd (formerly Stalingrad) attacked the Chechens from the north.

Following their plan, the Chechen command concentrated most of their regular forces against the Russian Main Assault Force commanded by Lieutenant General Anatoly Kvashnin. The MAF comprised the 131st Separate Motor Rifle Brigade and the 81st Guards Motor Rifle Regiment from the city of Samara. The 131st brigade's job was to move into the city from the north at dawn toward the train station. On the brigade's left flank, the 81st regiment drove down Pervomaiskaya Street.

==== Pervomaiskaya Ulitsa (Street) ====
One of the two assault groups of the 81st regiment drove toward Pervomaiskaya Street, stretching along the road for a mile. They were delayed while the advanced detachment removed demolition-charges at the River Neftyanka bridge along their route. The first casualty was a T-72 tank attached to the reconnaissance platoon at the crossroads of the Mayakovskogo and Khmel'nitzkogo streets just before the Pervomaiskaya street, with the gunner and driver killed from multiple RPG hits and internal ammunition detonation; the commander survived. Small-arms fire was also received, and one of the reconnaissance vehicles was disabled. Another was attacked from the school building at the start of Pervomaiskaya Street, while a third reconnaissance vehicle was abandoned.

As the reconnaissance platoon retreated into the column, the troopers were confused because they were followed by a truck, and there was hesitation to fire on it because Russian troopers were ordered only to return fire. However, the truck was approaching the leading tank platoon at high speed, so it was destroyed by the accompanying Tunguska. The huge detonation indicated it was a suicide truck bomb. Accompanying artillery fired into the area around the school building for about 45 minutes, and all incoming fire ceased.

At 2 pm, the leading assault group reached the Mayakovskogo street objective. However, while the first echelon was conducting artillery fire, the 1st echelon vehicles (81st Gd MR Regt.) were stationary, and this caused the leading vehicles of the second echelon (2nd Bn., 131st IMR Br.) to mingle with them due to lack of coordination. This lack of experience, including by the individual vehicle drivers, caused a considerable traffic jam at the Mayakovskogo and Khmelnitzkogo intersection for much of an hour. However, that intersection represented the objective for the first day of operation, and both battalion commanders prepared their command for a defensive over-night position.

Suddenly, Pulikovsky ordered them to resume the advance. Captain Arkhangelov, 81st Regiment's deputy for training with the 1st Company, 1st Motor Rifle Battalion, reported call-sign "Mramor" ordering them to advance into the city. In retrospect, some field troopers thought this call sign belonged to General Leonti Shevtsov, Chief of Staff of the Combined Group of Forces in the Chechen Republic.

At this point, the advance guard of the "North" Group reached their 'first day of operation' objective, and the columns of the two battalions of the 81st Guards Motor-Rifle Regiment arranged into a defensive position. Supporting artillery was tasked with firing into citizen defenders.

The Russians had no operational plan for an advance that day. After the order from "Mramor" came to continue the advance toward the Presidential Palace, the advancing column quickly formed during the lingering confusion from the Mayakovskogo and Khmelnitzkogo intersection fiasco. The elements of 1st battalion departed first, but, with them, elements of the 2nd battalion and some vehicles from supporting sub-units. Meanwhile, more vehicles arrived in the intersection, mostly stray detachments left to guard the route earlier including single vehicles recovered from break-downs.

The traffic jam was exacerbated by the elements of the 255th Guards Motor Rifle Regiment arriving as the second echelon of the "North" Group. This supported the decision for the first echelon to re-commence movement. The 255th proceeded to the Central Hospital Complex east of the Central Railway.

==== Dzerzhinsky and Ordzhonikidze squares ====
From the Mayakovskogo and Khmelnitzkogo intersection, the 1st battalion advanced toward the Dzerzhinskogo square via Dzerzhinskogo Street. They also used parallel streets in an attempt to reduce congestion in the column. Point elements reached the railway station just after noon. This column included the 3rd Company of the 1st Battalion with Colonel Perepelkin commanding. They were joined by the 4th company from the 2nd battalion plus the 7th tank company. At Dzerzhinskogo square, the 7th tank company was tasked with guarding the bridge from Krasnikh Frontovikov street. This column included about 40 BMPs, 9 to 12 tanks (including several 'strays') and at least one anti-aircraft vehicle.

From there, the column attempted to reach the Ordzhonikidze square, but came under intense fire from the Chechens. Colonel Yaroslavtzev, commanding the 81st Regiment, ordered all units to return to the Dzerzhinskogo square before sundown. All units in the Ordzhonikidze square received fire from all types of weapons from different directions, disabling several vehicles including tanks. The regimental and battalion radio signals were 'jammed', so the two battalion commanders in the square drove around to deploy their vehicles and coordinate defensive fire.

As the Russian point vehicles reached the Presidential Palace, they were ambushed by heavy fire from Chechen small arms and rockets from roofs and basements along the street. The Chechen ambush funneled the Russian armored columns, then the RPG gunners disabled the first and last vehicles in the line to trap the rest of the battalions in the middle. Relatively useless in urban combat compared to dismounted fighters, Russian tanks were unable to elevate their cannons high enough to engage the top floors of many buildings, or low enough to fire into the basements.

The brigade's deputy commander for training, Colonel Stankevich, took command of the largest group of the regiment's survivors after the bulk of the unit's armor was destroyed in the street; joined by some paratroopers, they eventually fought back to Russian lines. After obliterating most of the 81st, the Chechens foraged the Russians for weapons and ammunition. By the evening, the Russians gathered in the center of Grozny around the city's main marketplace, then moved toward the main train station.

==== Central Railway Station ====
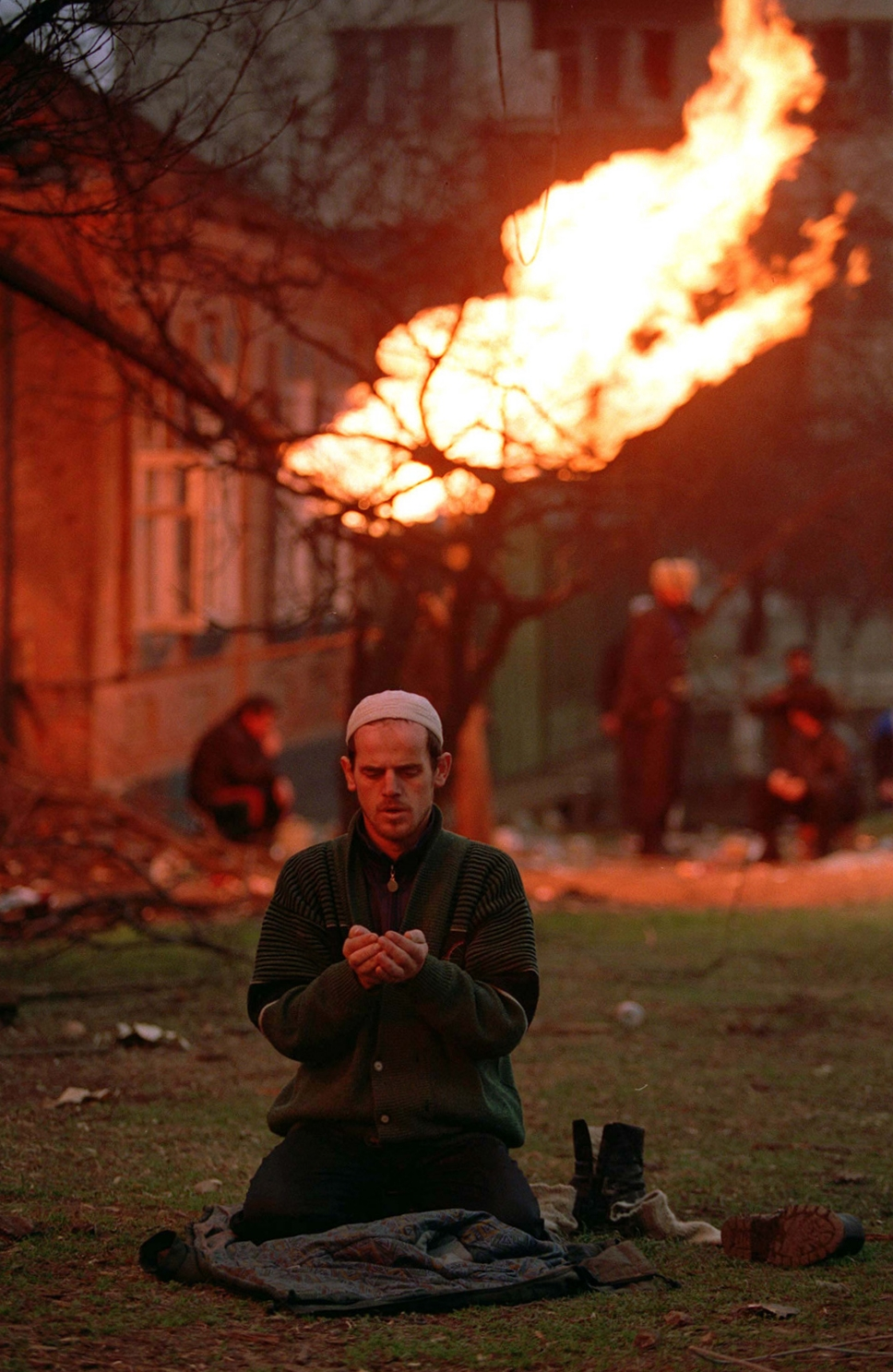
A Chechen civilian prays in Grozny, January 1995. The flame in the background is coming from a gas pipeline hit by air-burst shrapnel.

Mid-afternoon, the first battalion of the 131st MRB occupied the train station. Because of the radio black-out, they were unaware of the 81st MRR's situation. They separated from the second battalion from the freight station to the west, and from the third battalion on the outskirts of the city. The unit parked their tanks and armored personnel carriers around the station to wait for orders, around which time Ali "Lambada" Adayev, who was the Chechen commander opposing Russian Colonel Ivan Alekseevich Savin prior to the encounter and was worried about bloodshed on both sides, extended a desperate plea to Savin (nicknamed Alik by Adayev in the brief communication), proposing a negotiation for Savin to "withdraw his men and come to him as a guest", an offer which the latter had no choice but to reject due to having insufficient permission to call a ceasefire. Sometime after, a Russian communications officer heard the words "Welcome to Hell" on his headset. Shortly after, Chechen defenders in the depot buildings, the post office, and the five-story building surrounding the station opened devastating automatic and anti-tank fire. The surviving Russian troopers took cover inside the station, then the Chechens completed their ambush by setting it on fire. Colonel Savin radioed for help and artillery fire, but help never arrived.

Most distress calls from the 131st went unanswered. The second and third battalions of the brigade responded to the call for help, but were caught in layered ambushes before reaching the station. Both battalions were ordered to stay away from the Presidential Palace; this added to the trouble as the armored columns turned into alleyways, only to be destroyed by more of the layered ambushes. After a small element of the 503rd Motor Rifle Regiment received orders to move during the early hours of the day, they immediately received friendly fire from the other Russian forces bogged down under heavy fire; they fought each other for six hours (there were many more such incidents, some of them organized by the Chechens). The 8th Corps reached the city center from the north, but were unable to save the units fallen into the ambush. No Russian reinforcements reached the railway station.

At sundown, Colonel Savin decided to evacuate the wounded via the only working armored personnel carrier. After loading forty wounded troopers, the APC moved in the wrong direction (toward the center of the city). It eventually turned around to retreat along the same route, but was ambushed by Chechen anti-tank gunners; thirteen of the crew and passengers survived to be taken prisoner. On 2 January, Colonel Savin and his remaining officers abandoned the railway station. They found some abandoned Russian armored personnel-carriers. They attempted to escape, but were attacked by Chechen fighters. Savin died on the street from air-burst shrapnel beside his wrecked vehicle. By 3 January, the 131st Brigade lost twenty of twenty-six tanks and 102 of 120 other armored vehicles. The entire Maikop Brigade of over 1,000 men was wiped out in sixty hours.

During this debacle, General Grachev proclaimed "the entire city centre and several districts of the city and its outskirts are under complete control of Russian forces".

==== Summary of the New Year's Eve battle ====
The New Year's Eve battle was devastating for the Russians; the first Russian armoured column lost 105 of their 120 tanks and armoured personnel carriers. The entire first battalion of the Maikop Brigade, more than half of the 81st Regiment plus hundreds of men from the remaining units, were dead. A high-ranking Russian General Staff officer said "On January 2nd, we lost contact with our forward units." According to Maskhadov, some 400 Russian tanks and APCs were destroyed. Russian General Aleksandr Galkin reported 225 armored vehicles as unrepairable battle losses during the first month and a half of the invasion, including 62 tanks.

Most of the Russian 'Special Forces' surrendered to the Chechens "after wandering about hopelessly for three days without food, let alone any clear idea of what they were supposed to do." After returning home from captivity, a Russian lieutenant colonel said "the only order was to go forward, without explanations as to what they should do, where they should go, and whom they should capture."

Russian prisoners did not know where and why they were there; some were ordered to "protect roads," while others asked the reporters "who is fighting whom". After more captured Russian troopers were shown on television programming, the mothers of some went to Grozny to negotiate the release of their sons. Those negotiations took place in the center of the city without involving Russian government agents and while under Russian artillery bombardment; some of the prisoners were released on the promise they would never fight the Chechens again.

Unknown to the Russians and prior to the New Year invasion, Chechen President Dzhokhar Dudayev moved his headquarters to Shali, 25 kilometers south of Grozny. The Russian forces pulled back, abandoning many troopers. Morale dropped so low, units of the Interior Ministry and OMON forces outside town departed without orders.

=== Operations in the Grozny area after the New Year’s Eve battle ===
In the first days of January, Chechen forces not dealing with the remnants of the destroyed Russian units counterattacked against General Rokhlin's army group of some 5,000 men—who were now hastily entrenched in the north as the only organized Russian forces in Grozny at the time, unsuccessfully trying to drive it from the city. There were a handful of further Chechen attacks, but none successful.

On 4 and 5 January, the Chechens began retreating to villages south of Grozny with whatever combat vehicles they had at their disposal. These convoys were bombed by Russian air attacks. Though the Chechens were on the retreat, they still controlled much of the center of the city. Reinforcements from both sides arrived, including Chechen volunteers from the villages outside of Grozny and Russian Naval Infantry. The Russians proceeded to bombard Grozny with artillery, tank, and rocket fire as the rest of the battle centered on new tactics in which the Russians proceeded to destroy the city block by block. White phosphorus rounds and fuel-air explosive Shmel rockets were used by the Russian forces. They would then send in small groups of men sometimes spearheaded by special forces, making effective use of sniper teams. Two long weeks of costly bitter fighting ensued as the Russians moved to take the Presidential Palace.

==== Presidential Palace ====
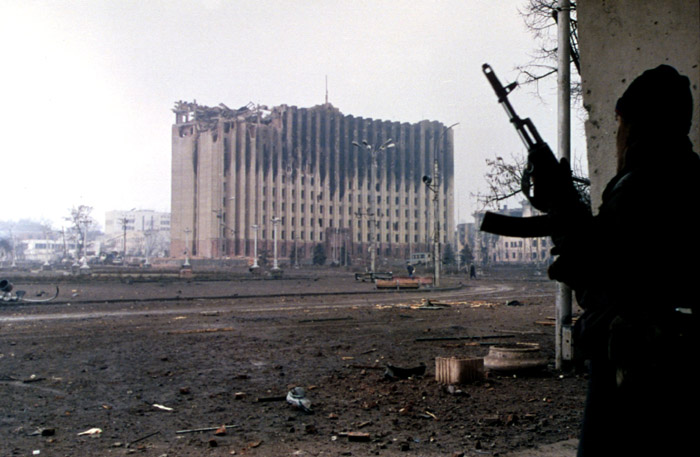
A Chechen fighter near the Presidential Palace in Grozny, January 1995

On 7 January, which is Christmas for East Orthodox Christians, the Russians concentrated their assault on the Chechen Presidential Palace, a large, concrete structure built in Soviet times as the local Chechen Communist party headquarters, including a blast shelter underneath. It was defended by 350 Chechen full-time fighters and an estimated 150 part-time militiamen.

The Russians launched heavy volleys of artillery and Grad rockets, setting buildings and the oil refinery ablaze. The Chechens held the Russians back, despite the upper floors of the building being on fire. Russian Major General Viktor Vorobyov (general) was killed by a mortar shell on the same day, becoming the first on a long list of Russian generals to be killed in Chechnya.

On 9 January, the Russians declared a ceasefire. Two hours after the ceasefire started, on 10 January, the Russians broke it and launched a heavy bombardment of the Presidential Palace and managed to position three tanks around the building, firing at point-blank range. Towards the middle of January, there was heavy fighting within 100–200 meters of the palace. As the Chechen resistance fell low on ammunition, food, and water, resistance proved ever more difficult for them.

On 18 January, Russian forces launched a massive air and artillery attack; by Chechen estimation, rockets were hitting the palace at a rate of one per second. Sukhoi Su-25 close air support aircraft dropped two bunker busters into the Palace. The bombs fell through all 11 floors and fell into the reinforced bunker below the building; one landed 20 meters from the HQ of General Maskhadov, but did not explode. Before midnight, the Chechen command left the Palace in three groups, Maskhadov being among the last to leave. These groups retreated to a hospital on the south side of the Sunzha river, while Russian helicopters flew over the city calling on Chechens to surrender with no effect.

==== Southern Grozny ====
For the next two days, the Russians lulled their bombardment to collect the dead and wounded in the streets. Russian president Boris Yeltsin prematurely declared that the "military stage of the operation" was over. General Lev Rokhlin, the commander of the unit that seized the palace was offered to be decorated with the order of the Hero of the Russian Federation, but he refused saying he saw nothing glorious in "fighting a war on my own land."

After losing so many men when taking the northern part of Grozny, the Russians concentrated their artillery heavily on the southern half, firing over 30,000 shells each day. For a time being there was no close combat, with the Chechens using mainly sniper rifles. After blowing up most of the bridges the Chechens used the Sunzha river as a newly established front line as all but the southern part of Grozny was now in the Russian control. The city, however, was not completely sealed off until 22 February 1995, and the Chechens routinely resupplied their forces through the corridor from Shali.

Eventually, Russians advanced within 200 meters of Maskhadov's HQ. Though he threw all his available forces against them, including the remaining three tanks, he could not manage to stop the offensive. It was at this point that they decided to move to abandon the positions along the Sunzha and retreat to the third line of defense along the mountain ridges that skirt Grozny.

==== Southern outskirts and mopping-up ====
On 25 January 1995, the Chechen leader Dzhokhar Dudayev said that no more Russian prisoners of war would be released until a ceasefire was signed. On 8 February, a truce was announced and most of the remaining Chechen forces, including all heavy equipment, withdrew from the devastated city. They moved their headquarters to the town of Novogroznensk, the first of several temporary capitals to follow.

On 13 February 1995, Russian and Chechen forces reached another ceasefire agreement limiting the use of heavy weapons, covering the use of aviation, artillery and mortars (however, the Russians returned to the large-scale artillery and aviation attacks in Chechnya a week later on 21 February). As the end of February approached, Shamil Basayev and his men were reduced to using small-scale hit-and-run tactics until they too finally pulled out by 6 March.

== Casualties ==
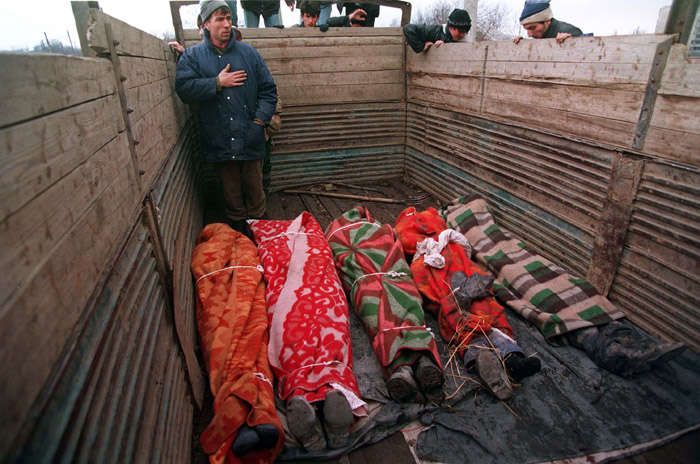
Bodies on a truck in Grozny

Military casualties are unknown, but are estimated to run into the thousands of killed and wounded on both sides. The officially released figures on the Russian losses were 1,376 killed in action and 408 missing in action, yet the actual figure could be higher.

Chechen fighters also suffered high losses. According to official Russian data, from December 11, 1994 to April 11, 1995, losses amounted to 6,690 killed and 471–600 captured. 500 units of combat equipment were lost: 78 tanks (64 destroyed and 14 captured), 132 infantry fighting vehicles (BMPs) (71 destroyed and 61 captured), 253 guns and mortars (108 destroyed and 145 captured), 16 BM-21 Grad MLRS.

As of the civilian casualties, Sergei Kovalev, the Russian Duma's commissioner for human rights, and Russian president Boris Yeltsin's aide on human rights, who had been in Grozny during part of the fighting, estimated 27,000 people, many of them ethnic Russians, died in five weeks of fighting, about 6% of the population. According to the World Peace Foundation at Tufts University,

sources estimate that a large percentage of civilian fatalities [during the First Chechen War] occurred during the invasion of Grozny between December 1994 and March 1995. From the beginning of the invasion to the middle of February, fatality estimates range from 25,000 to 30,000 civilian deaths. This range indicates that the majority of the civilian fatalities in the entire war occurred during a mere four-month window. Of the estimated 25,000 killed in the invasion of Grozny, it is estimated that 18,000 were killed by mid-January. According to General Dudayev, the first president of the Chechen Republic, 85 percent of civilians killed in the invasion (approximately 25,500) were ethnic Russians due to the fact that the Chechens were the first to evacuate the capital; this estimate is close to the figure put forward by Russian human rights campaigner Sergei Kovalyov, who estimated the number of ethnic Russian deaths at 24,000.

Anatol Lieven, who was also in Grozny during the battle, in his book Chechnya: Tombstone of Russian Power put his estimates lower at about 5,000 killed civilians, with some 500 more killed by the Russian air raids prior to the battle.

A report by the Human Rights Watch denounced indiscriminate bombings and shellings by Russian forces carried out against civilian populations, consistent targeting of civilian populations by ground forces and the destruction of three hospitals, one orphanage and numerous market areas. HRW estimates at least 350,000 people were forced to flee the region due to the conflict.

International monitors from the Organization for Security and Co-operation in Europe described the scenes as "unimaginable catastrophe," while German chancellor Helmut Kohl described the events as "sheer madness."

== See also ==
- Battle of Grozny (disambiguation)
- Battle of Grozny (November 1994)
- Battle of Grozny (August 1996)
- Battle of Grozny (1999–2000)
