= Nikolai Rogozhkin =

Russian general and government official

- Николай Рогожкин
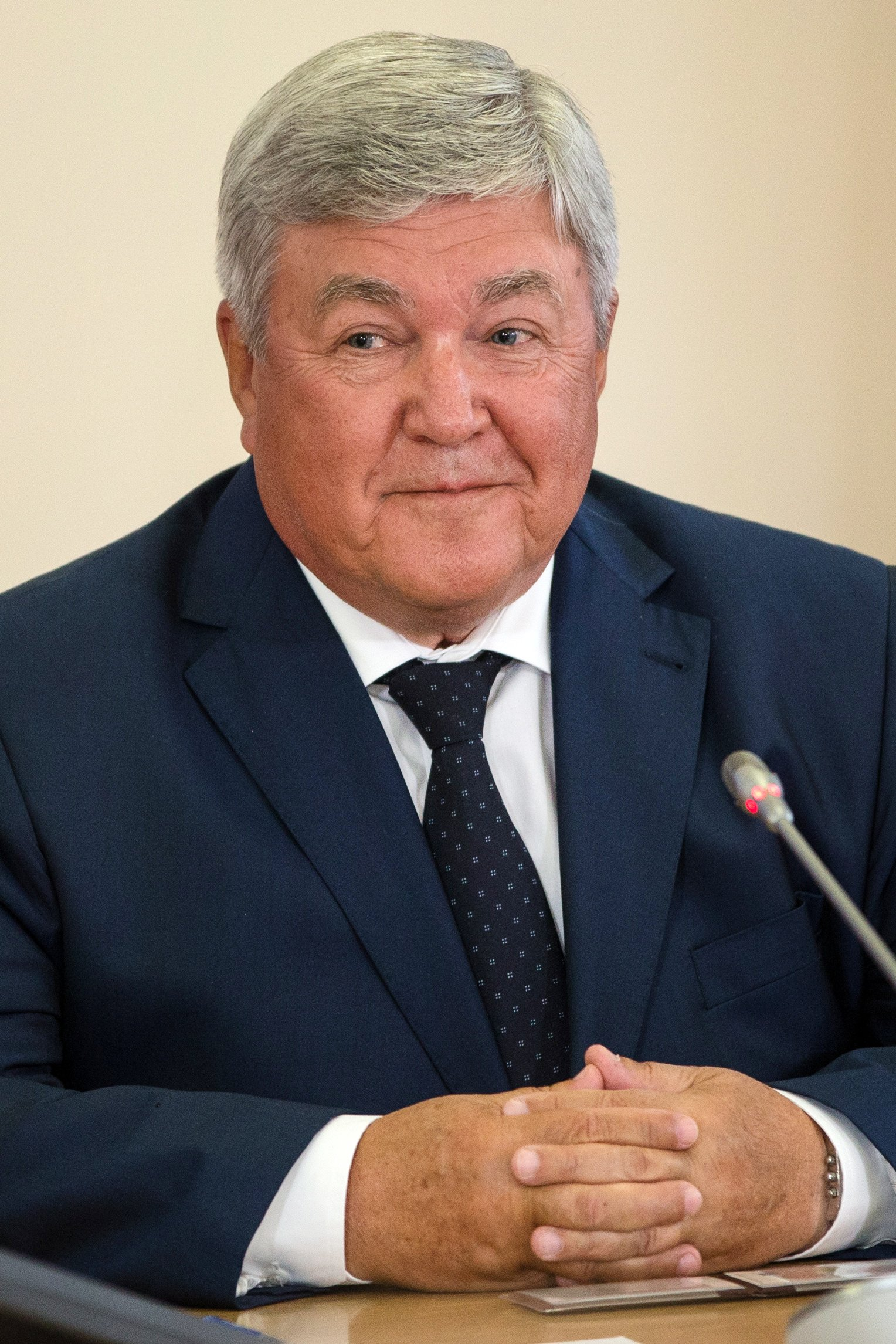
- Rogozkin in 2014

4th Presidential Envoy to the Siberian Federal District
- In office 12 May 2014 – 28 July 2016
- President: Vladimir Putin
- Preceded by: Viktor Tolokonsky
- Succeeded by: Sergey Menyaylo

Commander-in-Chief of the Internal Troops of Russia
- In office 13 August 2004 – 12 May 2014
- Preceded by: Vyacheslav Tikhomirov
- Succeeded by: Viktor Zolotov

Personal details
- Born: Nikolai Yevgenyevich Rogozhkin; 21 June 1952 (age 74) Michurinsk, Russia, Soviet Union
- Party: United Russia
- Education: Kharkov Higher Tank Command School; Malinovsky Military Armored Forces Academy; Russian General Staff Academy

Military service
- Allegiance: Soviet Union (to 1991); Russia
- Branch/service: Soviet Army; Russian Ground Forces
- Years of service: 1969–2014
- Rank: General of the army
- Commands: Internal Troops of Russia

General of the Army Nikolai Yevgenyevich Rogozhkin (Note: Russian: Николай Евгеньевич Рогожкин) (born 21 June 1952) is a Russian politician and military commander who last served as the Presidential Envoy to the Siberian Federal District from 2014 to 2016. Before that, he was Commander-in-Chief of the Internal Troops of the Ministry of Internal Affairs of Russia from 2004 to 2014. He was a general of the army since 23 February 2007.

He has the military rank of Army general and the federal state civilian service rank of 1st class Active State Councillor of the Russian Federation.

== Biography ==
=== Early life ===
Nikolai Rogozhkin was born in Michurinsk on 21 June 1952. His father, Yevgeny, worked at the locomotive repair plant in Michurinsk, and was a participant in the Great Patriotic War. His mother was the operator of the main post office in Michurinsk. He graduated from the 10th grade of secondary school in Michurinsk in 1969.

=== Military service in the Soviet Union ===
In August 1969, Rogozhkin began his military service in the Soviet Army. He graduated from the Kharkov Guards Higher Tank Command School named after the Supreme Soviet of the Ukrainian SSR in 1973, and the Malinovsky Military Armored Forces Academy in 1980.

Rogozhkin served in the 214th Motorized Rifle Regiment of the 75th Guards Heavy Tank Bakhmach Division of the Kyiv Military District as a tank platoon commander, starting in 1975. In 1977 he was promoted to chief of staff, and in 1978, he was promoted to tank battalion commander in the 42nd Tank Regiment of the Kyiv Military District. After graduating from the academy in 1980, he was appointed to the 20th Guards Motorized Rifle Carpathian-Berlin Division of the Group of Soviet Forces in Germany, as the chief of staff of the 1st Guards Tank Chertkovsk Regiment named after Marshal of Armored Forces Katukov. In 1984, he was the commander of the 40th Guards Tank Regiment, and in 1985, he was commander of the 1st Guards Tank Chertkovsk Regiment named after Marshal of Armored Forces Katukov. At the same time, he was appointed to the post of regiment commander with the military rank of major, and the rank of lieutenant colonel was awarded ahead of schedule in 1986. From 1986 to 1992 he was deputy commander and then commander of the 11th Guards Tank Carpathian-Berlin Division in the Turkestan Military District in Kushka), and the head of the district training center for junior specialists of motorized rifle troops in Ashgabat from 1992 to 1993.

=== Military service in Russia ===
Rogozhkin graduated the Military Academy of the General Staff of the Russian Armed Forces in 1995. After graduating, he was a senior lecturer in the military art department of the academy. In February 1996, he was Deputy Chief of the Main Staff of the Ground Forces, and in May 1998, he was promoted Deputy Chief of the Main Directorate of the Ground Forces. In 1996 he took part in the planning and conduct of military operations in the Chechen Republic. In 1996 to 1997 he was in Tajikistan, and took part in hostilities on the Tajik-Afghan border.

On 3 July 2000, Rogozkhin was transferred to the Internal Troops of the Ministry of Internal Affairs of Russia, and Deputy Commander-in-Chief of the Internal Troops of the Ministry of Internal Affairs of Russia. He was also the Head of the Combat Training Directorate of the Internal Troops of the Ministry of Internal Affairs. On January 15, 2001, he was made First Deputy Chief of the General Staff of the Internal Troops of the Ministry of Internal Affairs of Russia. On 10 April 2002, he was First Deputy Commander-in-Chief, and Chief of the General Staff of the Internal Troops of the Ministry of Internal Affairs of Russia.

On 13 August 2004, Rogozhkin was promoted Commander-in-Chief of the Internal Troops. On 23 February 2007 by the decree of Russian President Vladimir Putin, Rogozhkin was awarded the military rank of General of the Army. Subsequently, the status of the position of the Commander-in-Chief of the Internal Troops of the Ministry of Internal Affairs was increased and from 11 January 2009, General Rogozhkin was the Deputy Minister of Internal Affairs of Russia, and Commander-in-Chief of the Internal Troops of the Ministry of Internal Affairs of Russia.

On 12 May 2014, Rogozhkin was discharged from military service to the reserve.

=== Office of the Presidential Envoy to the Siberian Federal District ===
On 12 May 2014, Rogozhkin was the Presidential Envoy to the Siberian Federal District.

He was awarded Acting State Councilor of the Russian Federation, 1st class (2014).

Commenting on the forest fires in Siberia in April 2015, Rogozhkin made unfounded allegations that they could have been started by saboteurs consisting of organized opposition groups. He also advised the fire victims to start clearing the areas affected by the fires by their own hand over the unburned scrap metal.

==== Resignation ====
On 28 July 2016, Rogozhkin decided to leave his post, and was replaced by Sergey Menyaylo. After leaving the post of Plenipotentiary Representative of the President of the Russian Federation in the Siberian Federal District, he joined the public sector.

After leaving the reserve, he went to work as an assistant to the plenipotentiary representative of the President of the Russian Federation in the Central Federal District on a voluntary basis.

He is also the deputy chairman of the Dynamo society, the chairman of the Moscow city organization of the Dynamo sports society and the deputy head of the Proekt-Tekhnika concern.

He is the organizer and curator of a traditional hockey tournament, which has been held for several years in a row in the Michurinsk District.

Rogozkhin is a member of the Public Council under the Investigative Committee of Russia.

== Residence ==
Rogozhkin lives and works in Moscow and in the Michurinsk District of the Tambov Oblast.

=== Academic degrees and titles ===
He was candidate of Pedagogical Sciences (2004, dissertation "Formation of the readiness of future officers for management activities"). Rogozhkin is the Professor at the Academy of Military Sciences.

=== Family ===
Rogozhkin is married and has a son, who is an officer, serving in the Federal Security Service.
