= Akhmat Kadyrov Square =

Square in Grozny (Russia)

Coordinates: 43.3166°N 45.6925°E

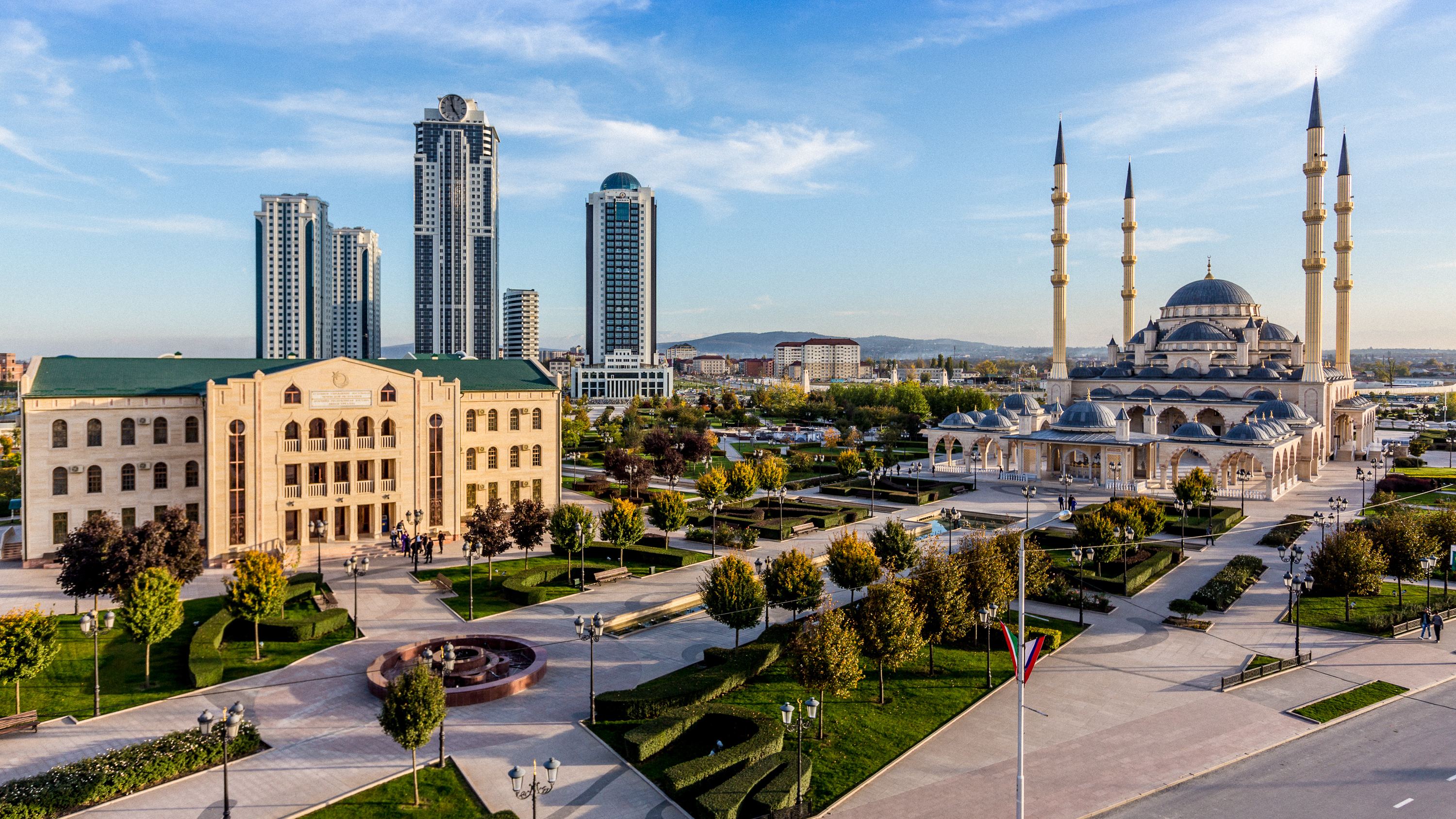
Akhmad Kadyrov Mosque

Akhmat Kadyrov Square (Russian: Площадь Ахмата Кадырова), also known as the Square named after the 1st President of the Chechen Republic (Russian: площади имени первого президента Чечни Ахмада-Хаджи Кадырова), is a public area in Grozny, Chechnya. It is located at the intersection of Vladimir Putin Avenue and Khusein Isaev Avenue. It is named in honor of the first leader of the Chechen Republic Akhmat Kadyrov.

== Description ==
A monument to police officers who died in the fight against terrorists and Wahhabis was erected on the square. On the square for the 200th anniversary of Grozny, a large map of the Chechen Republic was laid out from colored paving stones. On it, the boundaries of the subject were highlighted in gray, and the outlines of all areas are highlighted in black.

== History ==
In Soviet times, the square was named after Vladimir Lenin. After the collapse of the USSR, it was renamed Freedom Square. During the period of the de facto independence of Chechnya, the square was formerly named after Sheikh Mansur until 1996. Earlier on the site of the square was the Presidential Palace of Dzhokhar Dudayev. In 1996, the building was blown up by federal troops of the Russian Armed Forces, and later the ruins of the palace were turned into an open square that was later granted the name Kadyrov Square in honor of Chechen president Akhmat Kadyrov, who died in the 2004 Grozny stadium bombing.

== Events ==
Military parades have been held in the square many times, including one in 1997 dedicated to the anniversary of the 1994 Battle of Grozny. Modern parades are held on to commemorate the anniversary of the unconditional surrender of Nazi Germany on this day in 1945. During the parade in 2015, actors reenacted the Battle of Berlin on the square.

In 2017, Chechen Muslims rallied in Akhmat Kadyrov Square in support of those persecuted in the Rohingya genocide.
