= Presidential Palace, Grozny =

Former building in Grozny, Chechnya, Russia

Coordinates: 43°18′59.00″N 45°41′34.21″E

Presidential Palace
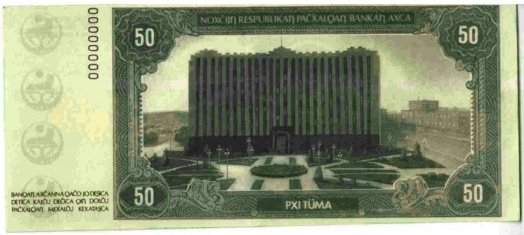
- The building featured on a Chechen 50 naxar
- Interactive map of the Presidential Palace area

General information
- Architectural style: Soviet architecture
- Location: Grozny, Chechnya
- Year built: 1982
- Demolished: 1996

Technical details
- Floor count: 11

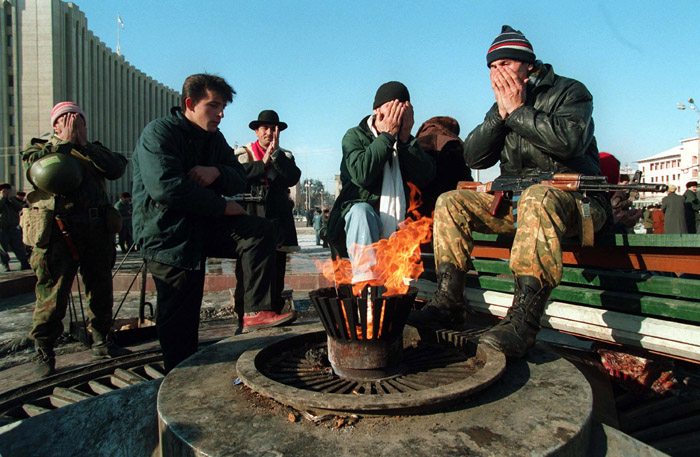
Dudayev's supporters in front of the Presidential Palace in Grozny, December 1994, just days before the battle for the city began. Photo by Mikhail Evstafiev

The former Presidential Palace in Grozny (Chechen: Mekx-Den ċaġalab Sölƶa-ġaleẋ; Russian: Президентский дворец в Грозном, romanized: Prezisentskiy dvoryets v Groznom) was a building in the center of the Chechen capital Grozny. The building became a symbol of resistance for the supporters of the Chechen Republic of Ichkeria during the early stages of the conflict in Chechnya. The building was damaged by repeated artillery and air strikes. The Russian army demolished it completely in 1996.

== History ==
The 11-floor building was originally the headquarters of the Communist Party of the Soviet Union in the Chechen-Ingush Autonomous Soviet Socialist Republic. Eventually General Dzhokhar Dudayev, the first leader of the Chechen Republic of Ichkeria, adopted it as his presidential palace and the main seat of his government (Dudayev's actual office was on the eighth floor of the building). During the period of de facto independence from Russia (November 1991-February 2000) the square outside the building was named in honour of Sheikh Mansur.

=== First Chechen War ===
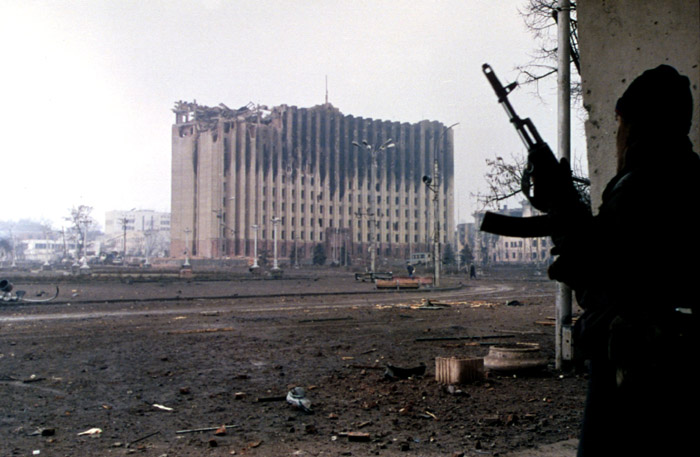
A Chechen fighter near the burned-out presidential palace during a short lull in fighting in Grozny, January 1995. Photo by Mikhail Evstafiev

The palace was the target of abortive attacks by the Russian-supported Chechen opposition forces through 1994 but was not targeted in the initial Russian bombing campaign. During the early phase of the 1994–1995 Battle of Grozny the palace was the primary objective of the disastrous New Year's Eve assault by the Russian forces, the place where columns of the Russian army were supposed to meet after advancing from various directions, as well as further Russian attacks. The soldier who would raise the flag of Russia over the building was promised to have become a Hero of the Russian Federation and the Russian Defense Minister Pavel Grachev even claimed his forces captured it during the initial storming.

Although Dudayev left Grozny early in the battle, the massive concrete structure of his presidential palace turned into the main Chechen stronghold in the city. It, together with the surrounding buildings, was fiercely defended by several hundred separatist fighters, including some of Dudayev's presidential guards and the battalion of Shamil Basayev. The basement under the palace became the battle headquarters of Aslan Maskhadov, the Chechen chief of staff, shared with a field hospital and an improvised prisoner-of-war camp for captured Russian soldiers. Sergei Kovalev (Boris Yeltsin's human rights commissioner), six other State Duma deputies, as well as several journalists and aid workers (including Viktor Popkov) were also trapped in the bunker for days following the initial Russian attack.

The Russian forces shelled the building for nearly three weeks, scoring hundreds of direct artillery hits, including with mortars, point-blank tank fire and a particularly devastating salvo of BM-21 rockets. They deployed thousands of troops for some two weeks of fierce fighting that completely destroyed many of the municipal buildings and houses near the palace and reduced it to little more than a gutted shell. Eventually, by January 16 the Russians managed to surround the burning building on three sides (the fourth being the Sunzha River), but still failed to dislodge the defenders.

On January 17, 1995, two enormous nine-ton bunker buster bombs were dropped, in a rare instance of the use of precision-guided munitions by the Russian Air Force in Chechnya. One of them penetrated the building and exploded in the underground hospital, killing at least 50–60 people including many of the prisoners; the second one, which landed just metres from Maskhadov's command post, failed to explode and Maskhadov escaped unhurt. After midnight on January 18, the ruined building was abandoned by the last defenders, who crossed a bridge to the other side of the river under cover of darkness, and was finally seized by the Russians the next day.

The site was a scene of a massive peace demonstration in February 1996. The rally ended in bloodshed when the Russian government forces fired on the demonstrators, killing several people. The Russians then completely, permanently demolished the ruins soon afterwards.

=== Post-war and reconstruction ===
The site where the building once stood is now the site of the Akhmat Kadyrov Square. With funds from the Federal Government the area has been redeveloped. It is now home to the Akhmad Kadyrov Mosque, the second largest mosque in Russia.
