= Battle of Grozny =

There were several battles of Grozny:

- Siege of Grozny (1917) by Chechen branch of Savage Division
- Siege of Grozny (1918) by Terek Cossacks
- Battle of Grozny (1919) between Denikin and allied Bolsheviks and Islamists
- Battle of Grozny (1920) between White and Red armies
- Battle of August (August 1994) – a failed attempt by Provisional Council of the Chechen Republic to take the city from Chechen separatists
- Battle of Grozny (24 September – 2 October 1994) – a failed attempt by Provisional Council to take the city
- Battle of Grozny (14 – 16 October 1994) – a failed attempt by Provisional Council to take the city
- Battle of Grozny (November 1994) – a failed attempt by Provisional Council to take the city
- Battle of Grozny (1994–1995) – Russian army takes the city from Chechen separatists
- Battle of Grozny (March 1996) – a three-day siege laid on the Russians by Chechen attackers
- Battle of Grozny (August 1996) – a successful retaking of the city by Chechen separatists
- Battle of Grozny (1999–2000) – Russian army takes the city from Chechen separatists
