= Ruslan Labazanov =

Chechen mob boss and warlord

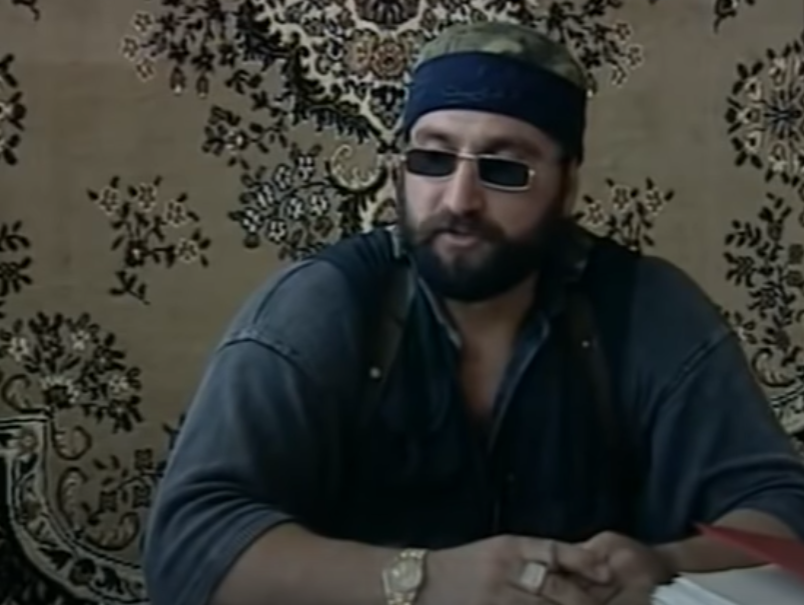
- Labazanov in 1996, shortly before his disappearance
- Born: 1967; Kazakh SSR, Soviet Union (now Kazakhstan)
- Disappeared: 1 June 1996 (age 29); Tolstoy-Yurt, Chechen Republic of Ichkeria
- Status: Missing for 30 years, 4 months and 10 days, Likely dead

Ruslan Khamidovich Labazanov (1967 – disappeared 1 June 1996) was a pro-Russian Chechen mob boss turned warlord who led the Russian-supported Chechen anti-Dzhokhar Dudayev faction in the First Chechen War.

== Early life ==
Labazanov was born in internal exile in Kazakhstan in 1967 in the Chechen family of a teyp Nohch-Keloy (clan). He became an Eastern martial arts expert and served in the Soviet Red Army as a physical training instructor. After leaving the army, he became known as a flamboyant, charismatic and extremely violent gangster. In 1990, he was convicted of murder in Rostov-on-Don and sentenced to death before escaping from prison in 1991. According to himself, he actually escaped from Grozny pretrial detention center: "During the 1991 coup, I freed the whole prison, nearly 600 men, ahead of time. They obeyed me."

== Biography ==
In 1992, Labazanov aligned closely with the Chechen President Dzhokhar Dudayev, eventually becoming the chief of Dudayev's personal Presidential Guard and holding a rank of captain in the Chechen National Guard (in 1992–1993 he had also been engaged in illegal arms trade) before failing out with him after a year-and-half during the 1993 Chechen constitutional crisis. After a bloody two-day clash between his followers and allies, including Chechen mafia boss Nikolay Suleimanov, and Dudayev's loyalists in the centre of the Chechen capital Grozny on June 13–14, Labazanov fled the city and promptly declared a blood feud against Dudayev for the death of his relative (either a brother or a cousin), whose head was publicly displayed among the heads of three of his other henchmen.

Labazanov then joined Umar Avturkhanov and the other criminal leader and one-time Dudayev supporter Beslan Gantamirov (the ex-mayor of Grozny) in the anti-Dudayev opposition, called the Chechen Provisional Council, operating as commander of his own paramilitary outfit, the Niiso (Justice) movement, partially controlling the Shalinsky and Vedensky districts of southern Chechnya. Labazanov assumed a role of a "Chechen Robin Hood", a self-styled defender of the people against the oppressive authorities. His private army of about 200 men, mostly former convicts like himself, was based in and around the town of Argun and supplied with T-72 tanks and other heavy weapons provided by the Russian special services. They also provided personal security and other armed men for Ruslan Khasbulatov (freshly released from Russian prison following his defeat in the 1993 Russian constitutional crisis), and his abortive peacemaking initiative.

In the summer of 1994, Chechnya descended into a fierce civil war-style conflict between the Chechen government and the opposition forces. For the first two months the clashes were sporadic, but on September 4, Dudayev's forces attacked Labazanov's stronghold of Argun and after a fierce all-night battle during which dozens of fighters were killed on both sides succeeded in dislodging him out of the city. The fighting culminated in the November 26 attempted raid on Grozny by the Chechen opposition supported by the covert Russian federal forces, which resulted in the final defeat for the Provisional Council and the open intervention by Moscow. During the subsequent First Chechen War of 1994-1996, Labazanov sided with the invading Russian federal forces and promptly was given the rank of colonel in the Russian internal security service FSK (soon to be reorganized into the FSB).

On June 1, 1996, it was reported that Labazanov was slain together with a bodyguard at the village of Tolstoy-Yurt, 15 kilometres north of Grozny. He was reportedly gunned down at point-blank range in his fortified castle-like house, where he had been living with his three wives. The perpetrator was allegedly one of his own men. The Russians quickly implicated the Chechen separatist field commander Shamil Basayev in the killing. According to another version, Labazanov fell victim to blood vengeance by the relatives of a killed Chechen police officer.

== See also ==
- List of unsolved murders (1980–1999)
