= Russia–Chechnya Peace Treaty =

1997 agreement ending the First Chechen War

- Type: Peace treaty
- Signed: 12 May 1997; 29 years ago
- Location: Moscow
- Signatories: Boris Yeltsin; Aslan Maskhadov

The Russia–Chechnya Peace Treaty of 1997, also known as the Moscow Peace Treaty, was a formal peace treaty "on peace and the principles of Russian–Chechen relations" following the First Chechen War of 1994–1996. It was signed by the president of Russia Boris Yeltsin and the newly elected president of Chechnya Aslan Maskhadov on 12 May 1997, in the Moscow Kremlin.

== Events ==
The 1997 agreement was preceded by the Khasavyurt Accord signed by Maskhadov, then the chief of staff of Chechen separatist forces, and the Russian general Alexander Lebed on 30 August 1996, which had formally ended the war in Chechnya with the withdrawal of all federal forces and administration, and thus the return to uneasy status quo of 1991–1994. During the often-tense subsequent talks, the Russian negotiating team was headed by Ivan Rybkin, Lebed's replacement in the post of chief negotiator, and Boris Berezovsky and their Chechen counterparts Movladi Udugov and Akhmed Zakayev. In January 1997, Russia officially recognized the new Chechen government of president Maskhadov, paving the way for his meeting with Yeltsin. Shortly before flying off to Moscow, Maskhadov persuaded a renegade commander Salman Raduyev to cease his agitation and provocations against Russia.

In the short treaty the two sides agreed to reject "forever" the use of force or threat of force in resolving disputed issues, and to build bilateral relations between the Russian Federation and the Chechen Republic of Ichkeria "on the generally recognized principles and norms of international law". Besides Maskhadov and Yeltsin, former Chechen acting president Zelimkhan Yandarbiyev also took part in the signing, together with Zakayev and Udugov, and several Russian top government officials. According to Yeltsin, this was a "peace deal of historic dimensions, putting a full stop to 400 years of history [of the Chechen–Russian conflict]". It was then complemented by a longer intergovernmental economic agreement signed the same day by Aslan Maskhadov and the Russian prime minister Viktor Chernomyrdin, including the heated issue of how much Russia would pay the devastated republic in war damages.

The Moscow treaty caused great jubilation in Chechnya, but the key issue of independence was not resolved. According to the Khasavyurt Accord, all agreements on the relations between Grozny and Moscow should be regulated until the end of 2001, however in 1999 Moscow nullified the peace treaty and invaded the breakaway republic again, occupying its whole territory by the next year. In 2003, Russia created the new constitution for Chechnya, according to which the Chechen Republic is one of federal subjects of the Russian Federation.
