= Ruslan Gelayev =

Chechen military commander (1964–2004)

- Руслан Гелаев

Deputy Prime Minister of Ichkeria
- In office 1 January 1997 – February 1997
- Preceded by: Aslan Maskhadov
- Succeeded by: Aslan Maskhadov

Personal details
- Born: 16 April 1964 Komsomolskoye (Saadi-Kotar), Chechen–Ingush Autonomous Soviet Socialist Republic, Soviet Union
- Died: 28 February 2004 (aged 39) Near Bezhta, Dagestan, Russia
- Awards: Qoman Siy (1995)
- Nickname: Black Angel

Military service
- Allegiance: Confederation of Mountain Peoples of the Caucasus; Abkhazia; Chechen Republic of Ichkeria
- Years of service: 1992–1993 (Abkhazia); 1993–2004 (Chechnya)
- Rank: Brigadier General (demoted in 2000)
- Commands: Borz ("Gelayev's spetsnaz"); Sharia Guard
- Battles/wars: War in Abkhazia; First Chechen War; Second Chechen War; 2001 Kodori crisis

Ruslan Germanovich Gelayev (Russian: Руслан Германович Гелаев; Chechen: ГелаевгӀер Герман-воъ Руслан, romanized: Gelaevher German-vo' Ruslan; 16 April 1964 – 28 February 2004) was a Chechen military commander and prominent military figure of the Chechen resistance against Russia. Albeit a controversial figure, Gelayev was commonly viewed as an abrek and a well-respected, ruthless fighter. His operations spread well beyond the borders of Chechnya and even outside Russia and into Georgia. He was killed while leading a raid into the Russian Republic of Dagestan in 2004.

== Biography ==
Ruslan Gelayev was born in 1964 in the village of Komsomolskoye (Saadi-Kotar) near Urus-Martan, 10 years after his parents had returned from the Stalinist deportation of Chechens into Central Asia. He was from Chechen Highland teip Gukhoy. Gelayev lived for several years outside Chechnya in the Russian Soviet Federative Socialist Republic, held various jobs and, at one point, served in the Soviet Army.

=== Georgian-Abkhazian conflict ===
In 1992–1993, Gelayev fought in the War in Abkhazia, on the side of separatists battling the Georgian government. He fought as a volunteer for the Confederation of Mountain Peoples of the Caucasus militia, which had been initiated by Russian intelligence, serving under Shamil Basayev. Together with the Chechen Battalion, Gelayev took part in the Battle of Gagra, which marked a turning point in the war.

After his return to Chechnya, he joined the forces of the Chechen Republic of Ichkeria's president, Dzhokhar Dudayev, taking command of the special forces regiment Borz (Борз, "Wolf" in Chechen) made up of veterans of the Abkhaz conflict. During the subsequent war with Russia, Timur Mutsurayev wrote a song dedicated to the unit, "Gelayev's Spetsnaz!" (Гелаевский спецназ!), which became popular in Chechnya. In 1993–1994, the unit took part in combat actions against the anti-Dudayev Chechen opposition forces of Ruslan Labazanov and Beslan Gantamirov who were later being aided by Russian covert operations operatives and mercenaries recruited by the Russian secret service FSK from the ranks of the Russian Army.

=== First Chechen War ===
Gelayev fought against the Russian federal forces in the First Chechen War of 1994–1996, notably as a senior commander in the Battle of Grozny, for which he became one of the first to be awarded the Chechnya's highest medal Kioman Syi (Honor of the Nation). In early 1995, he became the commander of the South-Western Front for the separatist forces, tasked with defense of the Argun Gorge area. The Russians nicknamed him the "Black Angel" (Чёрный ангел), after his radio communications call sign, "Angel".

Following the fall of Grozny and the Russian push into the highlands, Gelayev personally led the defense of the mountain village of Shatoy, where he was wounded several times. Mumadi Saidayev then took over the command of the front. During this battle, on 27 May 1995, Gelayev announced that if the aerial bombing of the village continued, a number of captive Russian military aviation officers would be killed every day and, according to the Russian human rights group Memorial, eight Russian POWs were executed as Gelayev carried out this threat. The later President of Ichkeria (and still later the self-proclaimed leader of the Caucasus Emirate) Dokka Umarov initially served under his command, together with Akhmed Zakayev, before they left it to form their own units.

On 16 April 1996, Gelayev and Saudi Arabian pan-Islamist militant Ibn al-Khattab ambushed and destroyed a large convoy of Russian armored vehicles in the famous Shatoy ambush, killing scores - or possibly hundreds - of federal soldiers, almost all of them within the first 15 minutes of the attack, with minimal losses on their own side. Previously, on 6 March 1996, Gelayev had led a surprise raid on Grozny, seizing large parts of the city for two days and inflicting serious losses on Russian forces, before leaving with more than 100 civilian hostages. This was seen as a rehearsal before the recapture of the city in the Battle of Grozny (August 1996), in an operation led by Basayev in which Gelayev also participated, and that ended the war.

After the war, Gelayev became a deputy prime minister under the new Chechen President Aslan Maskhadov in April 1997. He went on a Hajj pilgrimage to Mecca and took the name Hamzat. The following year, in January 1998, he was appointed the defence minister of Chechnya, a largely honorific post which he held until he was replaced by Magomed Khambiyev in July 1999. Gelayev became the first deputy defense minister in charge of security forces, including personal command of the Sharia Guard. Gelayev, however, maintained links with both Maskhadov and his rivals, in particular with Zelimkhan Yandarbiyev and Salman Raduyev.

=== Second Chechen War ===
At the start of the Second Chechen War in late 1999, Gelayev commanded a force of some 1,500 fighters in the siege of Grozny, charged with defense of the south-western sector of the city. However, he and most of his men left the city without orders in January 2000, which left it open to attack. Following Gelayev's unauthorized withdrawal from Grozny, Maskhadov demoted him from the rank of brigadier general to a private and stripped him of all military decorations.

In February–March 2000, Gelayev's forces took heavy losses as they withdrew from Grozny to the mountains of southern Chechnya, where they discovered that their mountain bases had been destroyed by Russian aircraft, leaving them starving, freezing, and low on ammunition. At that point, the notorious Chechen warlord Arbi Barayev contacted Gelayev, promising him aid and transportation to a safe area. When Gelayev's forces arrived at the specified meeting place, where buses were supposed to be waiting to evacuate their wounded, they were ambushed by a large number of Russian troops. They retreated to Gelayev's native village of Komsomolskoye (Saadi-Kotar). There, around a thousand or more rebels were trapped and the village was pounded for weeks by the federal forces in the Battle of Komsomolskoye, one of the bloodiest battles of the war, ending with hundreds of Chechen fighters and civilians dead, along with more than 50 government troops (according to Russian figures). Gelayev escaped, but with only a fraction of his men, and many of demoralized survivors decided to give up the fight. Anna Politkovskaya wrote, "How could he ever think of taking the war home, to Komsomolskoe, knowing in advance that his own home village would be destroyed!"

Some time after this crushing defeat at Komsomolskoye, the Russian government attempted to negotiate with Gelayev, since he was believed to be in conflict with the other Chechen commanders (especially with Barayev, against whom Gelayev fought a brief personal war following Barayev's apparent betrayal of him at Komsomolskoye). In November 2000, a Kremlin envoy confirmed that Russian federal authorities were involved in talks with Gelayev, but this information was refuted later. In 2002, pro-Moscow Chechen government leader Akhmad Kadyrov said to Politkovskaya that he had sent his envoys to negotiate with Gelayev several times. In 2003, Gelayev publicly denounced Kadyrov's claims as "blatant lies" from a "despicable traitor". According to The Independent, Gelayev's alleged secret talks with Kadyrov "broke down in early 2001 when Moscow refused to guarantee Gelayev's safety if he laid down his arms" and there were also rumours of earlier secret collaboration between Gelayev and the Russians, including the circumstances of his withdrawal from Grozny and his escape from Komsomolskoye. In 2002, a critical article in The Moscow Times called him "the rebel who rides to Russia's rescue".

In 2001, Gelayev decided to rebuild his forces in the remote Pankisi Gorge across the Georgian border. There, Gelayev had built up a significant armed force from hundreds of Chechen refugees, local Kists (Georgian Chechens), and Ingush and Dagestani volunteers, as well as scores of international mujahideen who had travelled there (mostly Azeris, Turks and Arabs). In August 2001, Gelayev played a crucial role in releasing Russian human rights activist Svetlana Kuzmina, who had been held in Chechen captivity for more than two years. Gelayev acted upon the request of Louisa Islamova, the wife of his friend and rebel commander Lechi Islamov, who was being held in Moscow's Lefortovo prison pending trial (Islamov died there, allegedly poisoned.) Islamova had tracked down Vyacheslav Izmailov, a former federal military officer turned a journalist for Novaya Gazeta, and offered to try to persuade the rebels to free hostages if Izamailov would help her try to secure her husband's release in court. Gelayev wrote a note warning Kuzmina's captors that if they did not free the woman, they would become his deadly enemies. Meanwhile, Georgian authorities were accused of negotiating a deal to supply and arm Gelayev's force in return for Gelayev's leading a raid on behalf of Georgia into the disputed Kodori Gorge in Abkhazia (the October 2001 Kodori crisis). Gelayev earned admiration from senior Georgian politicians, despite the failure of the attempt during which at least 40 people were killed (including five UN observers in a shot down helicopter). Responding to Russian accusations, Georgian president Eduard Shevardnadze said publicly that he had seen no evidence Gelayev was a terrorist, and described him as an "educated person."

From his bases in Pankisi, Gelayev organised a series of cross-border hit-and-run attacks into Russia. He would not perform any large-scale raid into Chechnya because he wanted to avoid clashes with fellow Chechens serving in pro-Moscow forces and because of his strained relations with Maskhadov and Basayev. However, more than 100 Chechen fighters left his group and returned to Chechnya under the command of Umarov in 2002. Many Dagestani and Kabarday fighters also split from Gelayev and returned to their own republics, Dagestan and Kabardino-Balkaria, launching the local insurgencies there. In September 2002, Gelayev personally led an incursion into the Russian republic of Ingushetia, capturing the villages of Tarskoye and Galashki, but his fighters became surrounded, took large losses and were dispersed. According to Russia, 30-40 Chechen fighters were killed in shootouts and air attacks and five were captured (though Chechen sources said that seven fighters were killed and five were missing). 17 Russian servicemen were also reported killed. Among those killed was Roddy Scott, a British freelance reporter who travelled with the rebels and was allegedly shot by a Russian sniper while attempting to surrender. Gelayev himself was severely injured and for a time being was out of action. In an October 2002 interview, he said he would "continue to fight until not only our country but all the nations of the Caucasus are freed from the double-headed eagle [of Russia]."

=== Death ===
In the winter of 2003–2004, Gelayev led a raid from Georgia into the mountainous Tsuntinsky District region of the Russian republic of Dagestan, during which 20-30 of his fighters (Chechen and Dagestani, reportedly including Khozh-Ahmed Noukhayev) and 15 Russian servicemen were reported to have died in the fighting and landslide accidents, while five rebels were captured. According to the official story, Gelayev died on 28 February 2004, following a skirmish with a two-man patrol of the Border Guard Service of Russia that he had encountered while attempting to cross the border into Georgia alone. Gelayev shot and killed both guards (First Sergeant Mukhtar Suleimanov and Sergeant Abdulkhalik Kurbanov, both from Dagestan, who were posthumously awarded the title of Hero of the Russian Federation), but he himself then died soon after as a result of a serious injury he suffered during the shootout, having been hit by a rifle burst in his left arm. After walking about 100 meters, Gelayev cut off his own mangled hand, but died from blood loss.

However, according to the Kavkaz Center version, Gelayev fought against a larger group of Russian troops and was killed after his arm was shot-off by heavy machine gun fire from a helicopter. In 2013, a retired Spetsnaz GRU Colonel Alexander Musienko claimed that he was aboard a helicopter which killed Gelayev and another Chechen fighter with gunfire and an avalanche caused by rockets already on 28 December 2003, but the corpse of Gelayev was only identified after being dug up from the snow in February 2004. According to Musienko, 20 Chechen fighters were killed and nine were captured and nine Spetsnaz GRU commandos under his command died in this battle, and that the official story of Gelayev's death after the clash with border guards was completely invented. A supposed death of Gelayev in the firefight "that left nine Russian soldiers dead in December" was actually officially reported at the time, but later refuted and assumed to be incorrect after the new version was announced on 2 March 2004.

The corpse was positively identified by the FSB, but was not released to his relatives because Gelayev was classified as a terrorist by Russian authorities. His family has since been campaigning for the release of his remains or disclosure of what happened to the body, including attempts to buy it back.

== Family ==
Gelayev's eldest son, Rustam, was born in 1988 in Omsk, Russia, where his father lived during the 1980s when he was married to a local ethnic Russian woman Larisa Gubkina. After living most of his life outside of Chechnya, in Russia, Rustam moved to Belgium and then to Egypt to study Islam, before allegedly joining the Syrian civil war to fight alongside Syrian rebels (according to the sources sympathetic to the uprising, like Kavkaz Center). Around 12 August 2012, the 24-year-old Rustam Gelayev was reportedly killed by an artillery attack during the Battle of Aleppo. His body was taken to Chechnya, where he was buried on 17 August. Kommersant, however, cited a relative of Gelayev as saying Rustam had been only studying in Syria and was killed on his way to Turkey while fleeing from the war.
