= Khasavyurt Accord =

1996 agreement marking the end of First Chechen War

Khasavyourt Joint Declaration and Principles for Mutual Relations
- Signed: 30 August 1996
- Location: Khasavyurt, Dagestan, Russia
- Mediators: Organization for Security and Co-operation in Europe
- Signatories: Aslan Maskhadov; Said-Khasanom Abumuslimov; Alexander Lebed; Sergey Kharlamov; Tim Guldimann
- Parties: Chechen Republic of Ichkeria; Russia

The Khasavyurt Accord (Chechen: Хаси-Эвлан Барт, Russian: Хасавюртовские соглашения), formally the Khasavyourt Joint Declaration and Principles for Mutual Relations, was an agreement that marked the end of the First Chechen War, signed in Khasavyurt in Dagestan on 30 August 1996 between Alexander Lebed and Aslan Maskhadov.

== Background ==
By the time the Khasavyurt Accord was signed, Russia had suffered a significant defeat with the recapture of Grozny, the Chechen capital, by Chechen forces. With mediation by Organization for Security and Co-operation in Europe representative Tim Guldimann, Russian Security Council secretary Alexander Lebed and lieutenant general Konstantin Pulikovsky began mediating with Ichkerian chief of staff Aslan Maskhadov on ceasefire agreements. However, these ceasefires failed to take hold until an agreement was drafted on 22 August 1996. The agreement, signed in Novye Atagi, included the demilitarisation of Grozny, the withdrawal of both Chechen and Russian forces from the city, and the establishment of a jointly-run command to prevent looting. Eight days later, after hours of negotiations, the Khasavyurt Accords were signed.

== Contents ==
The accord consisted of four points: the establishment of relations between Russia and Chechnya, the creation of a joint Russo-Chechen committee to restore Chechen social order and prevent crime, the ensurance of legislation guaranteeing human rights and rights for ethnic minorities in Chechnya, and a guarantee that problems between Russia and Chechnya would be solved by mutual agreement. Crucially, the accord stipulated that any de jure recognition of Chechen independence by Russia would not have to be taken until late 2001.

== Aftermath ==
The Khasavyurt Accord was followed by two agreements between Ichkeria and Russia. The first, signed in mid-November 1996 by Maskhadov and Russian president Boris Yeltsin, focused on financial compensation and bilateral economic relations, while the second, signed on 12 May 1997 by Yeltsin and Maskhadov, formally established peace between Russia and Chechnya. Maskhadov said at the time that "any basis to create ill-feelings between Moscow and Grozny" would cease to exist as a result of the agreements. However, Maskhadov's government was undermined by Islamic extremists over the next two years, eventually resulting in Chechen commander Shamil Basayev invading Dagestan in 1999, an event that led to the start of the Second Chechen War.

== See also ==
- Russia–Chechnya Peace Treaty
