= Battle of Grozny (November 1994) =

Attempted coup d'état

November 1994 Battle of Grozny
- Part of the Chechen–Russian conflict
Date	26 November 1994
Location	Grozny, Chechnya
Result	Chechen separatist victory

Belligerents
Provisional Council Russian Federation: Russian contract soldiers; FSK	Chechen Republic of Ichkeria

Commanders and leaders
Alexander Kotenkov; Mikhail Kolesnikov; Gennady Zhukov; Ruslan Labazanov; Umar Avturkhanov	Dzhokhar Dudayev; Aslan Maskhadov; Shamil Basayev

Strength
1,500–3,000	3,000+

Casualties and losses
500 killed 70 Russian mercenaries captured 20–23 tanks destroyed 20 tanks captured 4 Russian helicopters downed 1 Sukhoi Su-25 downed	Unknown

The November 1994 Battle of Grozny was a covert attempt by Russian Intelligence services to oust the Chechen government of Dzhokhar Dudayev, by seizing the Chechen capital of Grozny. The attack was conducted by armed formations of the opposition Provisional Council, led by Umar Avturkhanov, with a clandestine support of Russian Federation armor and aircraft on 26 November 1994. The fighting subsided after the first 10 hours, with the Chechen Republic of Ichkeria decisively repelling the assault.

The Russian government officially denied military involvement in the operation, but openly supported the Provisional Council. The attack ended in a decisive failure, with hundreds of militiamen being killed or captured, in addition to 70 Russians killed and 35 to 120 captured. Dudayev threatened to execute the prisoners in an attempt to get an admission from Russia in regards to their involvement, prompting the government in Moscow to demand that Armed forces of Ichkeria free the captives and lay down their arms within 48 hours or face military intervention. The incident led to the large-scale military invasion of the republic that began in December 1994.

== Background ==
In the summer of 1994 the FSK (the former KGB and future FSB) began an active co-operation with leaders of the Chechen internal opposition against Dudayev, uniting them in a body named the Provisional Council of the Chechen Republic. Forces of Umar Avturkhanov (a former officer of the Soviet MVD) and Beslan Gantemirov (a former mayor of Grozny and Dudayev's ally-turned-enemy) received from Moscow not only money but also training and arms, including heavy weapons. The months of August and September saw the outbreak of fighting between the opposition and Dudayev's forces. By this time, the opposition had established a well armed force of several hundred men, equipped with armoured vehicles and covertly backed by Russian helicopters operating from an air base at Mozdok, Republic of North Ossetia–Alania. This military campaign climaxed in an attack on Grozny on 15–16 October, when the militias of Gantamirov (advancing north from the newly seized ChRI base at Gekhi) and Ruslan Labazanov (advancing south from Znamenskoye) unsuccessfully attempted to take the city by a joint assault for the first time (Labazanov alone had previously also attempted to enter Grozny on 24 August).

Disappointed by their failures and aware of their military weakness up to and after the October assault, the Chechen opposition, aided by an ethnic-Chechen former chairman of the State Duma, Ruslan Khasbulatov, intensified their lobbying with the FSK and Russian president Boris Yeltsin's staff in favour of more direct involvement on Moscow's part. As a result, Avturkhanov and Gantemirov, who by then have joined their militias, received all the weapons, instructors, training and media support they requested, setting the ground for the final assault. In October, Russia's Defense Minister General Pavel Grachev ordered the formation of a special task force of the Main Operations Directorate of the General Staff of the Armed Forces of the Russian Federation, led by the Deputy Chief of the Main Operations Directorate Anatoly Kvashnin and General Leontiy Shevtsov. Active duty tank crewmen from Russia's elite formations in the Moscow Military District, as well as other Russian personnel such as 18 helicopter crewmen from the North Caucasus Military District, were provided with fake documents and sent into Chechnya. A transport of 50 additional armored vehicles were also brought in by the FSK. The issues of recruitment (Russian tank commanders were reportedly offered an equivalent of $1,500 to participate in the coup) and transfer of weapons involved the deputy director of the FSK in charge of supervising the Caucasus, General Sergei Stepashin (his emissary to Chechnya was the FSK Colonel Khromchenko) and Russia's Deputy Minister for Nationalities, General Alexander Kotenkov, as well as his direct superior, Nikolai Yegorov.

== Attack ==
On 22 November, the Provisional Council began preparing their final assault on Grozny. A large group of Russian officers led by Chief of General Staff, Mikhail Kolesnikov, flew from Moscow to Mozdok, and the direct supervision of combat operations was entrusted to the deputy commander of Russia's 8th Guards Army Corps from Volgograd, General Gennady Zhukov. A convoy of Russian armored vehicles entered the territory of Chechnya. The first clash took place 10 kilometers from the border near Tolstoi-Yurt, when a small group of Dudayev's supporters ambushed the convoy and disabled two tanks. On the following day, en route towards Urus-Martan, the convoy was again attacked near the settlement of Alkhan-Kala (Yermolovka) resulting in a loss of another tank. In spite of this, the pro-Dudayev's forces in Grozny were believed to be unable to organize resistance to such a large-scale attack.

On the morning of 26 November, the Russian and their Chechen allies entered the capital in the motorised columns advancing from two directions, Nadterechny District and Urus-Martanovsky District, supported by several unmarked federal attack aircraft. According to Chechen commander Dalkhan Khozhaev, the coup force in Grozny numbered 42 T-72 main battle tanks, eight BTR-80 armoured personnel carriers, various other vehicles, a number of aircraft, and more than 3,000 men. Russian sources give similar figures of about 40–42 tanks (by one count, 14 of them manned by the Chechen opposition and the rest by Russians), supported from air by six helicopters and six Sukhoi Su-27 air superiority fighters, but give much lower figures of no more than 1,000–1,500 allied Chechen militiamen (including Labazanov's 30 remaining fighters after his militia was defeated at Argun). The attack was met with an improvised but fierce defense by the Chechen government forces and loyalist militias (prominently the battle-hardened Abkhaz Battalion made of veterans of the War in Abkhazia and led by Shamil Basayev) in the city center, including an ambush near the Chechen presidential palace and the fighting at the State Security headquarters, the railway station and the television center. Soon the assault turned into a disaster as the defenders burned or captured most of the attacking armored vehicles, capturing scores of Russian servicemen in the process (mostly after having trapped a large group of them in Kirov Park, Leninsky district), and completely routed the opposition.

== Casualties ==
- According to Russian sources, 40–50 men were taken prisoner (mostly Russian soldiers) and all but 18 tanks were lost. By one Russian count, the pro-Moscow forces suffered 40 killed and 168 wounded on the first day; another Russian source alleged that 70 opposition fighters from Ken-Yurt who had surrendered at the TV station were then executed by Dudayev's National Guard. All that remained of the Russian tank force and the Chechen opposition formations had left the city on the same day.
- Dudayev's loyalists claimed killing 350 attackers, destroying about 20 tanks and capturing four or five after the crews surrendered or fled.
- A 2010 count by Kavkaz Center estimated that 300–450 opposition militia and 70 Russian mercenaries were killed, hundreds more wounded and 150–200 taken prisoner (including approximately 35 officers of the Guards divisions Tamanskaya and Kantemirovskaya). In addition, 20 tanks, 23 armoured personnel carriers and 18 infantry fighting vehicles were estimated to have been destroyed and three tanks, eight APCs and four IFVs captured.
- According to Western sources, over 300 people died and the attackers lost most of their vehicles; in addition, four Russian helicopter gunships and one Sukhoi Su-25 close air support aircraft were reportedly downed. According to the figures cited by Human Rights Watch and Armor, between 70 and 120 Russian service personnel were taken prisoner.

== Aftermath ==
This defeat was catastrophic, not only in military but also in political terms. Any Russian complicity and knowledge of the operation was at first denied by Moscow, but then acknowledged after 20 captured Russian servicemen were paraded before television cameras and Dudayev threatened to shoot them if Yeltsin would not recognise his own soldiers. On 1 December, Yeltsin vowed to help the Russian prisoners, the first indirect acknowledgement of Russian involvement.

A failure of the coup attempt exhausted Russia's means of waging war against Dudayev by proxy and led to Russia launching an all out direct invasion in December 1994. On 28 November, the Security Council of Russia met in an emergency meeting, adopting a secret decision to prepare a plan for a military operation in Chechnya within 14 days, and Russia's Prime Minister Viktor Chernomyrdin called on for Yeltsin to "restore the constitutional order in the Chechen Republic". On the same day, a large air strike by the Russian military aviation eliminated every military and civilian aircraft available to Dudayev's government and destroyed the runways at both airfields near Grozny (the Khankala air base and at the Grozny Airport). On 29 November, Yeltsin gave Chechnya 48 hours to disband all "illegal armed formations", disarm, and release all prisoners. On 10 December 1994, tens of thousands of Russian regulars were ordered to move towards Grozny from Dagestan, Ingushetia and North Ossetia, and the First Chechen War officially began.

== See also ==
- Battle of Grozny (disambiguation)
