= Aslan Maskhadov =

Chechen politician and military commander (1951-2005)

- Ӏалларойн ӏела-воӏ Аслан
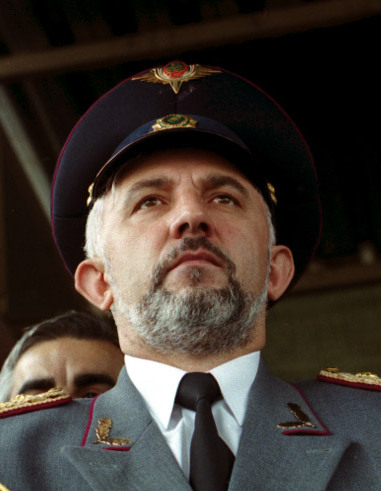
- Maskhadov in 1999

3rd President of the Chechen Republic of Ichkeria
- In office 12 February 1997 – 27 January 2002 (Note: Maskhadov's term legally expired, per the Constitution of the ChRI) / 8 March 2005 (Note: Maskhadov killed near Tolstoy-Yurt, from 2002-2005 Maskhadov was the de facto leader of the resistance.)
- Vice President: Vakha Arsanov; Abdul-Halim Sadulayev
- Preceded by: Zelimkhan Yandarbiyev (acting)
- Succeeded by: Abdul-Halim Sadulayev (acting)

Prime Minister of Ichkeria
- In office 16 October 1996 – 1 January 1997
- Preceded by: Zelimkhan Yandarbiyev
- Succeeded by: Ruslan Gelayev
- In office February 1997 – 1 January 1998
- Preceded by: Ruslan Gelayev
- Succeeded by: Shamil Basayev
- In office 3 July 1998 – 8 March 2005
- Preceded by: Shamil Basayev
- Succeeded by: Abdul-Halim Sadulayev

Personal details
- Born: 21 September 1951 Karaganda, Kazakh SSR, Soviet Union (now Kazakhstan)
- Died: 8 March 2005 (aged 53) Tolstoy-Yurt, Chechnya, Russia
- Party: National Independence Party
- Spouse: Kusama Maskhadova
- Children: 2
- Profession: Officer (armed forces)

Military service
- Allegiance: Soviet Union; Chechen Republic of Ichkeria
- Branch/service: Armed Forces of Ichkeria
- Rank: Major General
- Battles/wars: First Chechen War; First Battle of Grozny; Second Chechen War; Battle of Grozny

Aslan Aliyevich Maskhadov (Russian: Асла́н (Хали́д) Али́евич Масха́дов; Chechen: ӏалларойн Али-воӀ Аслан, romanized: Jallaroyn Ali-voj Aslan; 21 September 1951 – 8 March 2005) was a Soviet and Chechen politician and military commander who also served as the third president of the unrecognized Chechen Republic of Ichkeria.

He was credited by many with the Chechen victory in the First Chechen War, which allowed for the establishment of the de facto independent Chechen Republic of Ichkeria. Maskhadov was elected President of Chechnya in January 1997. Following the start of the Second Chechen War in August 1999, he returned to leading the guerrilla resistance against the Russian army. The republic ceased to exist territorially at the beginning of 2000. Until his death, Maskhadov was President in exile. He was killed in Tolstoy-Yurt, a village in northern Chechnya, in March 2005.

== Biography ==
=== Early life ===
On 21 September 1951, Aslan Aliyevich Maskhadov was born in Karaganda Region of the Kazakh Soviet Socialist Republic (SSR) of the Soviet Union, in the small village of Shakai, during the mass deportation of the Chechen people ordered in 1944 by Joseph Stalin. His family was from the Alaroy teip (of the Alkhan nek'e branch). In 1957, his family returned to Chechnya, where they settled in Zebir-Yurt, Nadterechny District.

Maskhadov joined the Soviet Army, trained in the neighbouring Georgian SSR and graduated from the Tbilisi Artillery School in 1972. He then graduated with honours from the Leningrad Kalinin Higher Artillery in 1981. He was posted to Hungary with a self-propelled artillery regiment until 1986 and then from 1986 in the Baltic Military District. He served from 1990 as the chief of staff of Soviet missile and artillery forces in Vilnius, capital of the Lithuanian SSR. In January 1991, Maskhadov participated in the January Events, the seizure of the television tower by Soviet troops (which he regretted later), but did not participate in the assault itself. During his service in the Soviet Army, he was presented with two Orders For Service to Homeland. Maskhadov retired from the Soviet Army in 1992 with the rank of a colonel and returned to his native land. He was at the head of ChRI civil defence from late 1992 to November 1993.

After the dissolution of the Soviet Union, in the summer of 1993, Maskhadov took part in raids on the armed opposition against the government of Dzhokhar Dudayev in the Urus-Martan, Nadterechny, and Gudermes districts. An unsuccessful anti-Dudayev mutiny in November 1993 resulted in the dismissal of Viskhan Shakhabov as chief of staff of the Chechen armed forces, Maskhadov was appointed as the acting chief of staff and, in March 1994, as the chief of staff.

=== First Chechen War ===
In December 1994, when the First Chechen War broke out, he was the senior military figure on the Chechen side during the war and was widely seen as being instrumental to the Chechen victory over the Russian forces. As the First Deputy Chairman of the ChRI State Defence Council (ChRI President Dudayev was the chairman) and the chief of staff, Maskhadov organised defence of the Chechen capital during the Battle of Grozny. Maskhadov commanded the city from the Presidential Palace in Grozny, where on one occasion a Russian bunker buster bomb landed 20 meters from him but failed to explode. In February 1995, Dudayev promoted Aslan to divisional general.

Beginning in June 1995, Maskhadov took part in peace talks in Grozny to resolve the crisis in Chechnya. In June 1996, at the negotiations in Nazran, Ingushetia, Maskhadov, on behalf of the ChRI administration, signed the Protocol of the Commission's Meeting on Ceasefire and Measures to Resolve the Armed Conflict in the CRI. In August 1996, after Grozny's seizure by Chechen units he repeatedly held talks with Alexander Lebed and on 31 August 1996, the signing of the Khasav-Yurt Accord took place, a ceasefire agreement, and peace treaty which marked the end of the First Chechen War.

=== President of the Chechen Republic of Ichkeria ===
Aslan Maskhadov and Boris Yeltsin shake hands after signing the Moscow peace treaty.

On 17 October 1996, Maskhadov was appointed Prime Minister of Ichkeria, while he also remained chief of staff and defence minister.

Running with Vakha Arsanov, who became his vice president, Mashkadov won a majority of 60% of the votes and was congratulated by the Russian president Boris Yeltsin, who pledged to work towards rebuilding relations with Chechnya. Maskhadov was inaugurated on 12 February 1997, and at the same time he assumed the office of prime minister and abolished the office of Defence Minister he had occupied since late 1996. Maskhadov remained commander-in-chief of the republican armed forces. On 12 May 1997, Maskhadov then attained the apex of his political career when he signed a peace treaty with Yeltsin at the Kremlin.

By the end of 1996, when Maskhadov assumed his office, nearly half a million people (40% of Chechya prewar population) had been internally displaced and lived in refugee camps or overcrowded villages. The economy was destroyed and the warlords had no intention to disband their militias. Under such circumstances, Maskhadov's political fortunes began to wane. His political standing within Chechnya became increasingly insecure as he lost control to Basayev and other warlords. Even his Vice-President Arsanov became his political enemy. Just like in the years before the First Chechen War under Dudayev, the years of Chechen independence were notorious for organized crime, including kidnapping, leading to several public executions of criminals.

Maskhadov attempted with only limited success to curb the growth of Wahhabism and other Islamist groups supported by Basayev, producing a split in the Chechen separatist movement between Islamist and secular Chechen nationalists. In February 1999, as a concession to radical Islamists, Maskhadov introduced Islamic Sharia law. The Sharia courts that were established sentenced people to death, flogging, executing people for crimes such as adultery.

Maskhadov survived assassination attempts on his life three times, on 23 July 1998 and 21 March and 10 April in 1999, in which the attackers used anti-tank missiles and bombs. Russian secret services were officially blamed.

=== Second Chechen War ===
In the summer of 1999, Maskhadov condemned an attempt by Basayev and Ibn Al-Khattab to spread war to the neighboring republic of Dagestan (known as the Invasion of Dagestan). This raid, and the Russian apartment bombings, sealed the fate of the Chechen Republic of Ichkeria. On 1 October 1999, the then Russian prime minister Vladimir Putin declared the authority of President Maskhadov and his parliament illegitimate. Putin sent Russian forces into Chechnya, and his promise of a quick and decisive victory propelled him to the Russian Presidency.

On 11 October 1999, Maskhadov outlined a peace plan offering a crackdown on renegade warlords, the offer was rejected by the Russian side. In response, President Maskhadov declared a gazavat (holy war) to confront the approaching Russian army.

Maskhadov was one of the main commanders in the Battle of Grozny (1999–2000) along with Shamil Basayev, Ruslan Gelayev, Ibn Al-Khattab, Aslambek Ismailov, and Khunkarpasha Israpilov. Maskhadov along with his men launched daring counter-attacks against the Russian troops while fighting in Grozny and also effectively used the sewer systems to attack Russian troops from behind. After a meeting with top rebel commanders, Maskhadov and others agreed to withdraw from Grozny and continue to attack Russian forces in the cities and towns surrounding the city. Maskhadov was the first to withdraw because of his importance to the rebel cause and because he was the official President of Chechnya. As Maskhadov and his men retreated, they set up a vast amount of booby traps and landmines to hinder Russian forces and make most of Grozny impassable.

After Chechen forces' withdrawal from Grozny following another battle for the city, Maskhadov returned to a life of a guerrilla leader, living in hiding as Russia's second most wanted man after Basayev, with Russia placing a $10 million bounty on his capture. He was seen as the official political leader of the separatist forces during the war, but it is unclear what kind of a military role he played. Maskhadov offered his readiness for unconditional peace talks with Moscow several times in 2000 alone, continuing in the following years, but his appeals for a political solution were always ignored by the Russian side.

Maskhadov advocated armed resistance to what he saw as a Russian occupation of Chechnya but condemned attacks on civilians. He allegedly supported the assassination of pro-Russian Chechen President Akhmad Kadyrov in Chechnya, whilst condemning the Russian assassination of Chechen separatist ex-President Zelimkhan Yandarbiyev in Qatar in 2004. Maskhadov often denied responsibility for the increasingly brutal terrorist acts against Russian civilians by Basayev's followers, continually issuing denunciations of such incidents through spokesmen abroad, such as Akhmed Zakayev in London. However, on 24 October 2002, radio communications were intercepted from Maskhadov's messages wherein he called for intensification of terrorist activities and sabotage in Russian territory. Evidence for Maskhadov's complicity in the 2002 Moscow theater hostage crisis was provided by its two principal perpetrators, Movsar Barayev and Abu Said. Although he initially denied responsibility for the 2004 Nazran raid, in which 98 police officers/troops were killed, in July 2004 Maskhadov publicly accepted responsibility for the attacks. In the same month, Maskahdov promised similar attacks would happen, and vowed that the winner of Chechnya's upcoming presidential election would be illegitimate and would be attacked if necessary. He described the rebels behind the Beslan school siege as "madmen" driven out of their senses by Russian acts of brutality and called the terrorist attack an atrocity.

On 15 January 2005, Maskhadov issued a special order to stop all military operations except those in self-defense, both inside and outside Chechnya, until the end of February (the date marking the anniversary of the Stalin's Vainakh deportations of 1944) as a gesture of good will, and again called for a negotiated end to the Chechen conflict. Umar Khambiev, his designated negotiator, said that the separatists were no longer seeking independence, but only "guarantees for the existence of the Chechen nation". This surprise, unilateral ceasefire was supported by Basayev but flatly rejected by the Russian and pro-Russian leaders who, once again, refused to negotiate. Maskhadov's order to temporarily cease all offensive actions was largely followed by the rebel movement, except in Dagestan.

=== Death ===
As of 2005, different versions of Maskhadov’s death existed. According to an official one announced on 8 March 2005 by the head of the Federal Security Service of the Russian Federation (FSB) Nikolai Patrushev, less than a month after Maskhadov announced the cease-fire, a special forces unit of FSB had:

"… carried out an operation in the settlement of Tolstoy-Yurt, as a result of which the international jihadist and leader of armed groups Maskhadov was killed, and his closest comrades-in-arms detained."

He said the special operations unit had intended to capture Maskhadov alive for interrogation but killed him accidentally with a grenade thrown into a bunker where Maskhadov was hiding.

Akhmed Zakayev, one of his closest allies who acted as his spokesman and foreign minister, told a Russian radio station that it was probable that Maskhadov had indeed been killed; he indicated later that a new Chechen leader could be chosen within days. Vladimir Putin awarded those responsible for the assassinations with medals. Shortly after Maskhadov's death, the Chechen rebel council announced that Abdul-Halim Sadulayev had assumed the leadership.

Four Chechens, Vakhit Murdashev, Viskhan Hadzhimuradov, Skanarbek Yusupov, and Ilias Iriskhanov, were captured in the raid. According to ballistic evidence at their trial in the Supreme Court of the Chechen Republic, Maskhadov was allegedly killed by a shot from the pistol of Viskhan Hadzhimuradov, his nephew and bodyguard. Hadzhimuradov, however, had testified that he does not remember whether he shot Maskhadov or not since he was stunned by an explosion but after the capture, Hadzhimuradov reportedly said: "My uncle always told me to shoot him if he is wounded and his capture is imminent. He said that if he is taken prisoner, he would be mistreated like Saddam Hussein had been".

A year later in 2006, a son of Maskhadov, Anzor, in an interview with Caucasian Knot allegedly claimed that his father was tracked down by a phone IMEI within 2 days before the raid took place. He was found in a hideout (an underground bunker) of one of his relative's buildings. Shortly after a standoff with Russian special forces he fired his hand weapon, was hit by a stun grenade, and then shot dead. He also expressed the belief that special forces intended to take him alive but failed.

== Unmarked grave ==
On 24 April 2006, the General Procurator's Office of Russia refused to return Maskhadov's body to his relatives for burial. The refusal was described as legal:

Maskhadov A. A., in connection with terrorism, was criminally responsible for many separate serious crimes on the territory of the Russian Federation. Taking this into account, it was decided to suppress Maskhadov's activities and Maskhadov was being pursued for our protection. The burial of such persons is carried out in accordance with the rules concerning the burial of those whose death was a result of the suppression of their terrorist actions, affirmed by the government of the Russian Federation on 20 March 2003, in Order No. 164. In this case, the body is not handed over for burial, and the location of the burial is not communicated.

Maskhadov's family has been campaigning for the release of his remains or a disclosure of what happened to his body. In 2006, they lodged a complaint to the Parliamentary Assembly of the Council of Europe on "illegal" refusal by Russian authorities at the time to return Maskhadov's body back to the family.

== Family life ==
He married at the age of 17. His wife Kusama holds a graduate degree in teaching. They had two children: a son, who took part in military action during the First Russian-Chechen War, and a daughter.

== Notes ==
Political offices
Preceded by Zelimkhan Yandarbiyev	President of the Chechen Republic of Ichkeria 1997–2005	Succeeded by Abdul-Halim Sadulayev
