= Timeline of Grozny =

The following is a timeline of the history of the city of Grozny, Chechen Republic, Russia.

== Prior to 20th century ==
- 1819 – Groznaya fort built by Russian Aleksey Petrovich Yermolov.
- 1870 – Grozny granted town status in Terek Oblast.
- 1876 – Population: 6,000 (approximate).
- 1893 – Oil discovered in Grozny area.
- 1897 – Population: 15,599.
- 1900 – Synagogue opens.

== 20th century ==
- 1913 – Population: 34,067.
- 1917 – Groznensky Rabochy newspaper begins publication.
- 1926 – Population: 97,000.
- 1928 – Grozny–Tuapse oil pipeline launched.
- 1929 – City becomes capital of the Chechen Autonomous Oblast.
- 1932 – Electric tramway begins operating.
- 1936 – Chechen-Ingush Philharmonic Society active.
- 1937 – Grozny Music College opens.
- 1938 – Grozny University founded.
- 1939 – Population: 175,000.
- 1944 – Vainakh people in North Caucasus expelled.
- 1946 – Stadium built.
- 1958 – August: 1958 Grozny riots.
- 1965 – Population: 314,000.
- 1973 – January: Ingush demonstrations at Lenin Square.
- 1977 – Grozny Airport terminal built.
- 1980 – Chechen State Teacher Training College founded.
- 1985 – Population: 393,000.
- 1991
  - City becomes capital of the Chechen Republic of Ichkeria.
  - Beslan Gantemirov becomes mayor.
  - Lenin Square renamed "Sheikh Mansur Square."
  - 9 November: Pro-Chechnya demonstration at Freedom Square.
- 1993 – 15 April: Demonstration against Dzhokhar Dudayev.
- 1994
  - 13 June: Conflict.
  - 15 October: "Opposition forces attack" city.
  - 26–27 November: Battle of Grozny.
  - 28 December: Battle of Khankala occurs near city.
  - 31 December: Battle of Grozny (1994–95) begins.
  - Population: 370,000 (estimate).
- 1995
  - January: Battle of Grozny.
  - 19 January: Presidential Palace captured by Russian forces.
  - Population: 60,000 (approximate).
- 1996
  - Presidential Palace, Grozny demolished.
  - May: Conflict.
  - 6–20 August: Battle of Grozny.
  - Mayor Beslan Gantemirov arrested for embezzlement.
  - Islamic Youth Centre opens (approximate date).
- 1997
  - City renamed "Dzhokhar-Ghala."
  - June: Mayoral election declared invalid.
- 1999
  - 1999 Russian bombing of Chechnya.
  - 21 October: Grozny ballistic missile attack.
  - 3 December: Refugee convoy shooting occurs near city.
  - 25 December: Battle of Grozny (1999–2000) begins.
- 2000
  - 30 January: Mayor Lecha Dudayev killed.
  - February: Russian forces take city.
  - 5 February: Novye Aldi massacre occurs near city.
  - 14 February: City "sealed."
  - 2 March: Grozny OMON fratricide incident.
  - April: Land mines cleared; civilians begin returning to city.
  - Grozneftegaz oil company headquartered in Grozny.

== 21st century ==
- 2001 – 17 September: Mi-8 crash.
- 2002
  - 18 April: 2002 Grozny OMON ambush.
  - 30 June: Peace rally at Teatralnaya Square.
  - 19 August: 2002 Khankala Mi-26 crash near city.
  - 27 December: Truck bombing.
  - Population: 205,000.
- 2003 – Movsar Temirbayev becomes mayor.
- 2004
  - 9 May: Explosion at stadium; Akhmad Kadyrov killed.
  - 21–22 August: 2004 Grozny raid.
- 2006 – Population: 240,000 (estimate).
- 2007 – Muslim Khuchiyev becomes mayor.
- 2008
  - Akhmad Kadyrov Mosque opens.
  - 11 October: The 5.8 M_{w} Chechnya earthquake shook the area with a maximum Mercalli intensity of VII (Very strong). Damage was limited in Grozny, but 13 were killed and 116 were injured in the districts of Gudermes, Shalinsky and Kurchaloyevsky.
  - Victory Avenue renamed "Putin Avenue."
- 2010
  - 19 October: Chechen Parliament attack.
  - Population: 271,600 (estimate).
- 2011 – Grozny-City Towers and Terek Stadium built.
- 2012
  - Islam Kadyrov becomes mayor.
  - Lermontov Drama Theatre rebuilt.
- 2013 – 3 April: Fire in Olympus Tower.
- 2014 – 4 December: 2014 Grozny clashes.
- 2015 – March: Rally in support of the annexation of Crimea by the Russian Federation.

== See also ==
- Grozny history (ru)
- Administrative divisions of Chechnya
- Other names of Grozny
- Timelines of other cities in the North Caucasian Federal District of Russia: Makhachkala

== Bibliography ==
Published in 19th–20th centuries

- "Groznaya", Hand-book for Travellers in Russia, Poland, and Finland (4th ed.), London: J. Murray, 1888
- "Grosnyi". Brockhaus' Konversations-Lexikon (in German) (14th ed.). Leipzig: Brockhaus. 1908.
- "Groznyi" . Encyclopædia Britannica. Vol. 12 (11th ed.). 1910. p. 638.

Published in 21st century

- "New Violence May Cut Short Chechnya's Modest Progress". Washington Post. 12 May 2004.
- Seth Mydans (1 June 2004). "In a Ruined City, Even the Rubble Is Taken From Them". New York Times.
- C.J. Chivers (19 October 2008). "Grozny, and Chechen History, being Reconstructed". New York Times.
- I. Demchenko (2013). "The Illusion of Peace: The Reconstruction of Grozny and the New Chechen Identity". In Sarah Moser (ed.). New Cities in the Muslim World. London: Reaktion. ISBN 978-94-007-4684-8.
- Margaret Evans (11 February 2013). "Grozny's makeover can't mask Chechen menace". CBC News. Canadian Broadcasting Corporation.
