= Grozny attack =

Grozny attack may refer to:

- 1999 Grozny ballistic missile attack
- 1999 Grozny refugee convoy shooting
- 2000 Novye Aldi massacre, suburb of Grozny
- 2000 Grozny OMON fratricide incident
- 2002 Grozny truck bombing
- 2004 Grozny stadium bombing
- 2010 Chechen Parliament attack

== See also ==
- Suicide attacks in the North Caucasus conflict
- 1958 Grozny riots
- Battle of Grozny (November 1994)
- Battle of Grozny (1994–95)
- Battle of Grozny (August 1996)
- 1999 Russian bombing of Chechnya, including Grozny
- Battle of Grozny (1999–2000)
- 2004 raid on Grozny
- 2014 Grozny clashes
