= 2026 Tuapse oil terminal attack =

Part of Russo-Ukrainian War

- Part of Deep strike campaign, Russo-Ukrainian War
- A fire in Tuapse, caused by Ukrainian drones

- Location within Krasnodar Krai Location within European Russia Location within Black Sea
- Date: 16 April 2026 – present
- Location: Tuapse, Krasnodar Krai, Russia; 44°06′07″N 39°05′56″E
- Also known as: 2026 Tuapse oil refinery fire
- Type: Industrial fire, environmental disaster, wartime infrastructure strike
- Theme: Air pollution, toxic emissions (benzene, xylene, soot), acid rain in surrounding areas
- Cause: Ukrainian drone attacks during the Russo-Ukrainian War
- Target: Tuapse oil terminal, Tuapse Refinery
- Outcome: Major fire, shutdown of Tuapse oil refinery and terminal operations, environmental contamination
- Deaths: 2 (first wave) + 1 (second wave)
- Injuries: 7 (first wave) + 3 (second wave)
- Property damage: Severe damage to refinery, storage tanks, pipelines, and port infrastructure

Between 16 April and 27 May 2026, Ukrainian drone strikes hit the Tuapse Refinery and Tuapse oil terminal amid a series of Ukrainian attacks in Russia. The attacks aimed at reducing Russian oil revenue following the 2022 Russian invasion of Ukraine. They damaged the refinery and terminal, a major oil export hub, starting large fires and forcing them to suspend operations. At least three people were killed, and there is significant environmental pollution in the area, including black rain and an oil spill.

== Background ==
The multi-day attacks took place at the Tuapse Refinery, a major oil-processing and export facility operated by Rosneft, with an annual capacity of around 12 million tonnes of crude oil. The refinery and associated marine terminal form a key part of Russia's petroleum export infrastructure on the Black Sea.

Tuapse had previously been targeted multiple times during the war due to its strategic importance for exporting refined petroleum products and generating revenue for the Russian economy.

== Events ==
On 16 April 2026, Ukrainian UAVs struck the Tuapse oil refinery and adjacent terminal facilities, igniting a large fire that spread across fuel storage areas and port infrastructure. The blaze burned for three days and forced a complete halt of refinery operations due to the inability to ship products. Emergency services deployed hundreds of personnel and dozens of vehicles to contain the fire, which produced a massive plume of smoke visible over long distances.

On 20 April, a second wave of strikes further damaged infrastructure, reignited fires, and intensified the scale of destruction at the site.

On 28 April, а third wave of strikes took place before flames from previous strikes were extinguished. Due to an air attack, residents of surrounding buildings were evacuated. More than 160 firefighters were deployed to extinguish the blaze.

On 2 May, The Guardian reported a fourth wave of strikes, and the Ukrainian SBU said that drones had again struck the seaport and the refinery. Local Russian officials said a major operation was under way to put out a fire, but reported no casualties.

Another attack was on the night of 26–27 May.

== Impact ==
The attack caused at least one confirmed death and multiple injuries. Significant damage was reported to port infrastructure, oil storage facilities, and nearby civilian buildings. The refinery suspended operations indefinitely, disrupting oil exports and logistics in the region.

The fires released hazardous substances into the atmosphere, including benzene and xylene, leading to severe air pollution around Tuapse. Authorities advised residents to remain indoors due to toxic conditions. Rainfall mixed with combustion byproducts created a phenomenon described as "black rain," depositing oily residue and soot across the city and surrounding areas. Satellite and environmental monitoring indicated the formation of an oil slick in the Black Sea near Tuapse, raising concerns about marine pollution and ecological damage.

The attack significantly disrupted operations at one of Russia's key export-oriented refineries, reducing throughput and forcing the diversion of tanker traffic to alternative ports such as Novorossiysk. Given the refinery's role in exporting petroleum products, the incident affected regional logistics and contributed to broader disruptions in Russia's energy export network.

A correspondent from the "Bereg" reported that a strong smell of oil is present in the city, making it difficult to breathe.

The resultant fires and smoke plume were so intense that the aftermath was commonly referred to as resembling a volcano.

By late April 2026, the environmental impact had intensified significantly. Large-scale oil spills and toxic smoke from repeated strikes led to severe contamination of air, soil, and coastal waters. Russian authorities reported that more than 13,000 cubic meters of fuel oil and contaminated soil had been removed from affected areas, while beaches along the Black Sea coastline were heavily polluted and in some cases rendered unusable. Residents were advised to remain indoors, keep windows closed, and rely on bottled water due to concerns over air and water safety.

Environmental experts, including Yevgeny Vitishko and Dmitry Lisitsyn, raised concerns about the broader ecological impact of the strikes. They noted risks related to air pollution, soil contamination, and the spread of oil products into marine ecosystems, warning that the full extent of the environmental damage may take time to assess.

== Emergency response ==
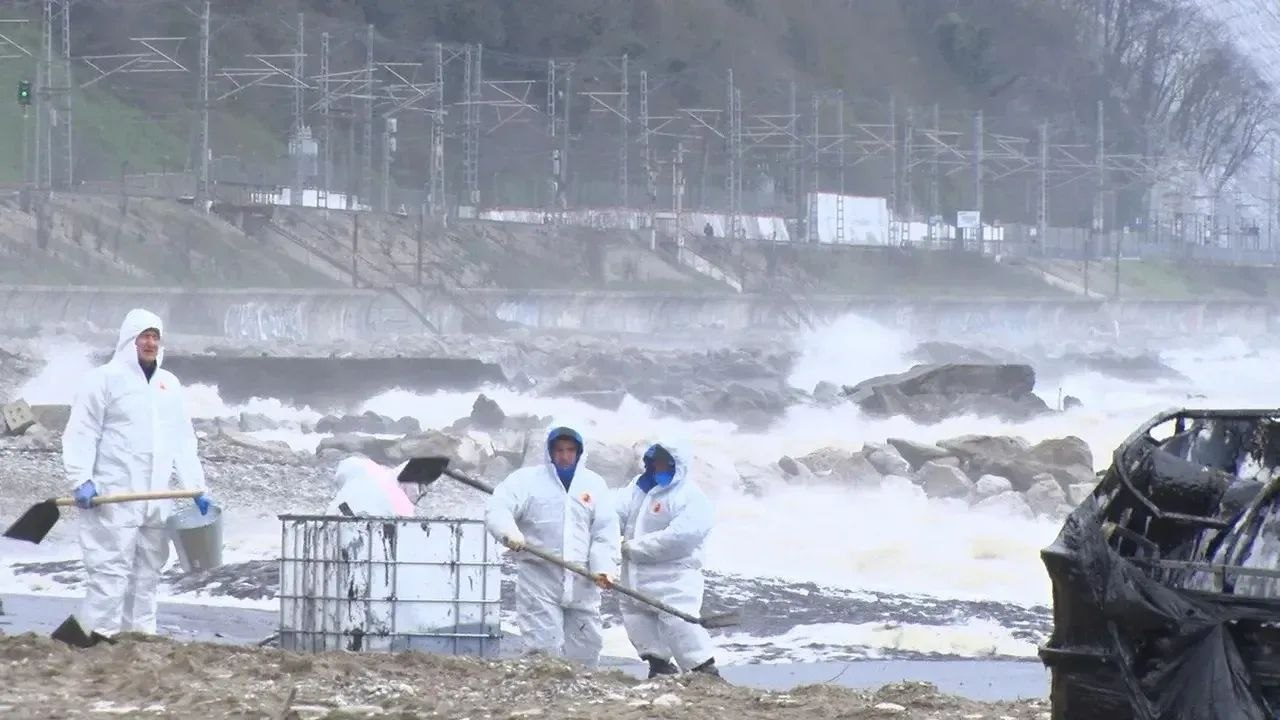
Elimination of oil spill in Tuapse

Local authorities declared a state of emergency following the initial strike on 20 April, closing schools and mobilizing firefighting units to contain the blaze.

Firefighting operations continued for days after the initial strike, with open flames eventually brought under control in three days.

According to the Krasnodar operational headquarters on 26 April, city services were working around the clock to clean oil contamination from the beaches. Authorities reported that as of April 26, over 2,500 cubic meters of contaminated soil have been removed, with 132 people and 26 pieces of equipment involved in the disaster response. Local residents were also assisting city services in cleaning the beaches. On 29 April, the Krasnodar-based outlet Anapa Region published an article that contained statements by Krasnodar Krai governor Veniamin Kondratyev, including him saying that the Tuapse situation was "under full control" and that footage of large scale fires was a "psychological attack", accusing Ukraine of using "insidious innovative" tactics involving fuel tanks attached to drones for dramatic effect. The article was deleted shortly after it was published, and the outlet said its website had been hacked to plant the interview.

On 29 April, Russia's minister of emergency situations, Aleksandr Kurenkov, said the spill of burning oil had been contained, and called the situation "difficult but under control." Russian president Vladimir Putin commented on the situation only after the third strike, referring to Kurenkov's report and highlighting potential environmental damage.

== See also ==
- 2026 Perm refinery attack
- 2025 Russian fuel crisis
- Environmental impact of the Russian invasion of Ukraine
- Attacks in Russia during the Russo-Ukrainian war (2022–present)
- Deep strike campaign
