= Musa Muradov =

Russian journalist (born c.1958)

- Born: c. 1958 (age 67–68); Grozny, Chechnya, Russia
- Occupation: reporter
- Organization(s): Groznensky Rabochy, Kommersant, Die Welt
- Known for: Coverage of First and Second Chechen Wars
- Awards: International Press Freedom Award (2003)

Musa Kaimovich Muradov (Russian: Муса Каимович Мурадов; born c. 1958, in Grozny, Russia) is an ethnic Chechen Russian journalist. In 2003, he was awarded the International Press Freedom Award of the Committee to Protect Journalists for his reporting on the Second Chechen War.

== Background ==
Muradov was born around 1958 in Grozny. He studied journalism at Moscow State University, graduating in 1982. He then joined the staff of Groznensky Rabochy, a weekly newspaper in Grozny that had been established in 1917. After the dissolution of the Soviet Union in 1991, Muradov became the paper's editor-in-chief. Initially, the newspaper, formerly controlled by the Communist Party, was independent. However, in 1993 Dzhokhar Dudayev, president of Chechnya's new, unrecognized secessionist government, attempted to convert the paper into an official publication of his party. In reaction, Muradov and most of his staff quit, leading the newspaper to shut down. Muradov found work for a time teaching journalism at a local university, as well as reporting for a small regional publication. In 1994, amid the growing violence of the First Chechen War, he and his family left Grozny for the relative safety of Moscow.

== Return of Groznensky Rabochy ==
Muradov and his family returned to Grozny in 1995, and Groznensky Rabochy resumed publishing as an independent newspaper in May, again with Muradov as its editor-in-chief. The work was dangerous, as the staff was reporting and publishing in the combat zone of Grozny. On 1 August 1996, Ivan Gogun, one of the paper's reporters, was killed in a crossfire in the Third Battle of Grozny. Muradov himself was trapped in a basement by damage from an artillery shell, remaining there for fourteen days.

The paper continued reporting through the Second Chechen War. Long-time Groznensky Rabochy correspondent Supian Ependiyev was killed covering the aftermath of a rocket attack on a Grozny bazaar on 27 October 1999; while he was conducting his interviews, a second round of rockets struck the bazaar, leaving him with fatal shrapnel injuries. At around this time, the paper was struggling financially, and its building was destroyed in a Russian bombing. The staff relocated to Nazran in nearby Ingushetia, a federal subject of Russia that borders Chechnya. They nonetheless continued reporting on the conflict, shipping the paper back to Grozny on a weekly basis. They also took turns serving week-long shifts reporting from Grozny. According to Muradov, the Russian military had placed a number of restrictions on foreign journalists, limiting their access strictly to military bases and escorted tours, but as local Chechens, Muradov and his staff could evade these requirements and speak directly to Grozny's civilians.

By 2001, however, both sides of the conflict had grown angry with Groznensky Rabochy's attempted neutrality, perceiving it as an implied endorsement of the opposing side. The Nazran offices of Groznensky Rabochy were searched by Russia's Federal Security Service and Ministry of Internal Affairs, while Wahhabi Chechen extremists declared a sentence of death for the paper's staff under Sharia law and began a series of threatening phone calls to the office. Muradov again moved with his family to Moscow to avoid the threats, and the remainder of the Groznensky Rabochy staff spread out across Russia. Muradov later stated that the strain of his reporting took a great toll on his family, nearly causing his wife and children to leave him.

== Post-war reporting ==
After the war, Groznensky Rabochy soon went bankrupt. Muradov became a full-time correspondent for Kommersant, a Russian business daily, while continuing to contribute to the German paper Die Welt. In 2004, he made international news when he succeeded in voting four times in the 2004 presidential election for a story on election irregularities. He wrote that he was confident that he could have voted more times had he not had to file his story.

In 2009, Dukvakha Abdurakhmanov, Speaker of the Chechen Parliament and ally of Chechen President Ramzan Kadyrov, denounced Muradov as "a scoundrel and a traitor to the Chechen people" who "has committed a crime against Chechen history", after Muradov published an interview with head of the Chechen Republic Ichkeria government-in-exile Akhmed Zakayev. In the interview, Zakayev had alleged that despite a year of Kadyrov saying publicly that he had invited Zakayev to return to Chechnya, Kadyrov had not extended the invitation in either of their conversations.

== International recognition ==
In 2003, Muradov was awarded the International Press Freedom Award of the Committee to Protect Journalists, "an annual recognition of courageous journalism". The award citation praised Groznensky Rabochy as a "rare voice of reason" in the violence and distorted coverage of Chechnya, as well as Muradov's "refusal" to "become a mouthpiece for either side".
