= Black rain =

Rain with dark particles like soot and ashes

Black rain is liquid precipitation polluted with dark particulates, especially soot and ashes (including coal ash) resulting from wildfires, coal combustion, or nuclear explosions (a liquid type of nuclear fallout).

== Notable incidents ==
The most notable cases of black rain were after the atomic bombings of Hiroshima and Nagasaki, Japan on August 6 and 9, 1945, respectively, in which more than 200,000 people died. In both instances, the enormous amount of airborne irradiated materials had the effect of "seeding" clouds, which led to rainfall in both cities within 30-90 minutes after the explosions. The irradiated rain mixed with carbon residue from the intense heat and firestorms, and fell to the ground as a black tar-like substance that was highly radioactive. Many survivors of the immediate bombing, desperate for water because of the heat and their burns, welcomed and drank the rain, unwittingly making their plight worse. The black rain eventually contaminated food and water, got into peoples’ clothing and skin and caused widespread radiation poisoning.

During the 2026 Iran war, an Israeli airstrike against Iranian fuel storage depots caused black rain that engulfed Tehran. Surfaces around the city were covered in black, sooty residue as a result.

=== Incidents during the Ukraine war ===
In April 2026 during the Russo-Ukrainian war, amidst the Deep Strike Campaign on the Russian Federation and their petroleum industry, Ukraine repeatedly attacked the oil terminal at Tuapse, which has led to black rain being seen in the town of Tuapse.

Similarly to Tuapse also in April 2026 amidst further Ukrainian drone strikes also led to black rain being seen in the city of Perm.

Amidst further drone strikes in Russia as part of the aforementioned campaign black rain was seen in Moscow following strikes on Moscow refinery where residents complained about black rain.

== See also ==
- Rain dust
- Red rain
