= Maksharip Muzhukhoev =

Ingush scientist

- Мужахой Машкарип
- Pronunciation: Russian pronunciation: [məkʂərʲɪp mʊʐʊxə(j)ɪf]
- Born: 25 December 1942; Grozny, Checheno-Ingush ASSR, RSFSR, Soviet Union
- Died: 16 July 2015 (aged 72)
- Education: Chechen-Ingush State Pedagogical institute
- Spouse: Elza Muzhukhoeva
- Father: Bagaudin
- Awards: honored worker of science of the Chechen-Ingush ASSR and Ingushetia, honorary worker of higher professional education of the Russian Federation, the Order of Merit (Note: Russian: За заслуги, romanized: Za zaslugi; the highest award in Ingushetia.)
- Scientific career
- Fields: History, Archaeology
- Workplaces: Chechen-Ingush Scientific and Research Institute of History, Language and Literature
- Thesis: Medieval Cult Monuments of the Central Caucasus (1987)
- Academic advisors: Evgeny Krupnov (until 1969), Svetlana Pletnyova (after 1969)

Maksharip Bagaudinovich Muzhukhoev (Note: Russian: Макшарип Багаудинович Мужухоев, IPA: [məkʂərʲɪb bəɡəʊdʲɪnəvʲɪt͡ɕ mʊʐʊxə(j)ɪf]; Ingush: Мужахой Бахьаудина Макшарип, romanized: Muzhaxoi Bahwaudina Maksharip) (23 December 1942 – 16 July 2015) was a Soviet and Russian (ingush) historian, archaeologist.

Born on 12 December 1942 in Grozny in Checheno-Ingush ASSR, Muzhukhoev spent his childhood and youth in the village of Chulaktau, Kazakh ASSR, as a result of the deportation of the Chechens and Ingush in 1944. In 1960, he, together with his family, returned to Grozny. In 1962 the future scientist entered the Faculty of History and Philology of the Chechen-Ingush State Pedagogical Institute, from which he graduated in 1967 and began teaching at a school in the village of Plievo. From 1968 to 1991, Muzhukhoev worked at the Chechen-Ingush Scientific and Research Institute of History, Language and Literature. In 1988, he was appointed the head of the History Department of Chechen-Ingush State University, achieving the title of professor in 1990. From 1994 to 1998 Muzhukhoev directed the Ingush Research Institute for the Humanities named after Chakh Akhriev.

In 1969 his first work, dedicated to the mountainous Assa basin of Ingushetia, was published. In 1972 the historian defended his candidate thesis on the topic "Medieval material culture of mountainous Ingushetia (13th – 17th centuries)". In 1987 Muzhukhoev defended his doctoral thesis on the topic "Medieval Cult Monuments of the Central Caucasus", becoming the first Ingush to achieve the title of doctor of historical sciences.

== Early life ==
Maksharip was born on 12 December 1942 in Grozny in Checheno-Ingush ASSR to an Ingush family. Maksharip's father worked in Grozny at a chemical plant while his mother was a housewife. In his family, he was the second child, having two younger brothers and an older sister. Together with his parents and grandparents, his family consisted of 9 people.

As a result of the deportation of the Chechens and Ingush in 1944, he spent his childhood and youth in the village of Chulaktau, Kazakh ASSR. There in Kazakhstan, Maksharip attended kindergarten and later a secondary school. After the secondary school, he got himself a job at a local pit mine. Because his family planned on returning to their homeland, admission to the university had to be postponed for some time. So in 1960, Maksharip, together with his family, returned to Grozny.

== Career ==
Muzhukhoev at first considered applying to a medical faculty but in 1962 he entered the Faculty of History and Philology of the Chechen-Ingush State Pedagogical Institute. In 1967, he graduated from it and he started teaching at a school in Plievo.

In 1968 Muzhukhoev went to work at the Chechen-Ingush Scientific and Research Institute of History, Language and Literature. At first he worked in sector of the economy, but with the advent of vacancies he was transferred to the sector of archeology and ethnography. In 1969 his first work, which was about the mountainous Assa basin of Ingushetia, was published.

In 1972 Muzhukhoev defended ahead of time his candidate thesis on the topic "medieval material culture of mountainous Ingushetia (13th – 17th centuries)". He was the one who for the first time write about the relationship of the Ingush material and spiritual culture with Georgian, Chechen and Ossetian.

In February 1987 Muzhukhoev defended his doctoral thesis on the topic "Medieval Cult Monuments of the Central Caucasus", becoming the first Ingush to achieve the title of doctor of historical sciences. The thesis was later published as a monograph in 1989.

In 1988 Muzhukhoev was elected to the position of head of the history department of Chechen-Ingush State University. In 1990, he achieved the title of professor.

== Works ==
- Muzhukhoev, M. B.; Pliev, A. A. (1976). "Об одной попытке определения места первоначального расселения гребенских казаков" [About one attempt to determine the place of the initial settlement of the Greben Cossacks]. In Dzeytov, Kh. Kh.; et al. (eds.). Вопросы истории Чечено-Ингушетии [Issues of the history of Checheno-Ingushetia] (in Russian). Vol. 10. pp. 351–358.
- Muzhukhoev, M. B. (1977). Pletneva, S. A. (ed.). Средневековая материальная культура горной Ингушетии (XIII—XVII вв.) [Medieval material culture of mountainous Ingushetia (13th to 17th centuries)] (in Russian). Grozny: Chech.-Ing. kn. izd-vo. pp. 1–180.
- Muzhukhoev, M. B. (1979). "Проникновение ислама к чеченцам и ингушам" [Penetration of Islam to the Chechens and Ingush]. In Muzhukhoev, M. B. (ed.). Археологические памятники Чечено-Ингушетии [Archaeological monuments of Checheno-Ingushetia] (in Russian). Grozny: ChI in-t istorii, sotsiologii, filologii. pp. 125–150.
- Muzhukhoev, M. B. (1980). "Таргимский храм" [Targim temple]. Северный Кавказ в древности и в средние века [North Caucasus in antiquity and in the Middle Ages] (in Russian). Moskva: Nauka. pp. 177–183.
- Muzhukhoev, M. B. (1981). "Проникновение христианства к вайнахам" [Penetration of Christianity to the Vainakhs]. Этнография и вопросы религиозных воззрений чеченцев и ингушей в дореволюционный период: Сб. науч. трудов [Ethnography and issues of religious beliefs of the Chechens and Ingush in the pre-revolutionary period: Coll. of scientific works] (in Russian). Grozny: Chech.-Ing. kn. izd-vo. pp. 23–45.
- Muzhukhoev, M. B. (1984). "К истории позднесредневекового зодчества Центрального Кавказа (по материалам полевых исследований автора в Чечено-Ингушетии и Северной Осетии)" [On the history of late medieval architecture of the Central Caucasus (based on the author's field research in Chechen-Ingushetia and North Ossetia)]. In Vinogradov, V. B.; Muzhukhoev, M. B.; et al. (eds.). Поселения и жилища народов Чечено-Ингушетии [Settlements and dwellings of the peoples of Checheno-Ingushetia] (in Russian). Grozny: Chech.-Ing. kn. izd-vo. pp. 94–106.
- Muzhukhoev, M. B. (March–April 1985). "Из истории язычества вайнахов (пантеон божеств в позднем средневековье)" [From the history of Vainakh paganism (pantheon of deities in the late Middle Ages)]. Sovetskaia Etnografia (in Russian) (2). Moskva: Nauka: 99–108.
- Muzhukhoev, M. B. (1985). "К вопросу об интерпретации некоторых культурных памятников Северной Осетии эпохи Средневековья" [On the issue of interpretation of some cultural monuments of North Ossetia from the Middle Ages]. In Bliev, M. M. (ed.). Вопросы историко-культурных связей на Северном Кавказе [Issues of historical and cultural relations in the North Caucasus] (in Russian). Ordzhonikidze: Severo-Osetinskiy gos. un-t. pp. 72–82.
- Muzhukhoev, M. B. (1988). "Трансформация погребального обряда с проникновением Ислама на территорию Чечено-Ингушетии" [Transformation of the funeral rite with the penetration of Islam into the territory Checheno-Ingushetia]. In Mamaev, Kh. M.; Muzhukhoev, M. B.; Chakhkiev, D. Yu. (eds.). Новые археолого-этнографические материалы по истории Чечено-Ингушетии [New archaeological and ethnographic materials on the history of Checheno-Ingushetia] (in Russian). Grozny: Tip. im. I. I. Zabolotnogo. pp. 85–95.
- Muzhukhoev, M. B. (1988-09-22). "Религии приходят и уходят..." [Religions come and go...]. Groznensky rabochy (in Russian). Grozny: Groznensky rabochy. p. 3.
- Muzhukhoev, M. B. (1989). Gapaev, A. S. (ed.). Средневековые культовые памятники центрального Кавказа: К истории религиозных верований в X—XIX веках [Medieval Cult Monuments of the Central Caucasus: On the History of Religious Beliefs in the 10th to 19th Centuries] (in Russian). Grozny: Книга. pp. 1–224. ISBN 5-7666-0270-7.
- Muzhukhoev, M. B. (1991). "Этнические процессы на Центральном Кавказе в древности и в средние века" [Ethnic processes in the Central Caucasus in antiquity and the middle ages]. In Bagaev, M. Kh.; Vagapov, Ya. S.; Muzhukhoev, M. B. (eds.). Проблемы происхождения нахских народов: Всесоюзная научная конференция: Тезисы докладов и сообщений [Problems of the origin of the Nakh peoples: All-Union Scientific Conference: Abstracts of reports and messages] (in Russian). Shatoy: Ministerstvo ChIR. pp. 22–24.
- Muzhukhoev, M. B. (1991-01-15). "Орстхойцы. Кто они?" [Orstkhoys. Who are they?]. Golos Checheno-Ingushetii (in Russian). Grozny: Groznensky rabochy. p. 4.
- Muzhukhoev, M. B. (1992-10-21). "Возрождение" [Renaissance]. Golos Checheno-Ingushetii (in Russian). Grozny: Groznensky rabochy. p. 3.
- Muzhukhoev, M. B. (1992-12-18). "Проблема орстхойцев. Почему она возникла?" [The problem of the Orstkhoys. Why did it arise?]. Respublika (in Russian). Grozny. p. 5.
- Muzhukhoev, M. B. (1992-12-25). "Проблема орстхойцев. Почему она возникла?" [The problem of the Orstkhoys. Why did it arise?]. Respublika (in Russian). Grozny. p. 4.
- Muzhukhoev, M. B. (March 1994). "К вопросу о языке орстхойцев" [On the question of the language of the Orstkhois]. Orstkho (in Russian). Vol. 9, no. 25. Achkhoy-Martan: Achkhoy-Martanovskaya tip.
- Muzhukhoev, M. B. (March 1994). "Расселение орстхойцев на плоскости в позднем средневековье и в XVIII—XIX веках" [Settlement of the Orstkhois on the Flat in the Late Middle Ages and in the 18th to 19th Centuries]. Orstkho (in Russian). Vol. 10, no. 26. Achkhoy-Martan: Achkhoy-Martanovskaya tip.
- Keligov, M. Yu.; Muzhukhoev, M. B.; Muzhukhoeva, E. D. (1994). "Ингуши" [The Ingush]. In Tishkov, V. A.; et al. (eds.). Narody Rossii (in Russian). SPb.: Bolshaya rossiyskaya entsiklopediya. pp. 161–164. ISBN 5-85270-082-7.
- Muzhukhoev, M. B. (1995-02-08). Владикавказ (краткая историческая справка) [Vladikavkaz (brief historical background)] (in Russian).
- Muzhukhoev, M. B. (1995). Ингуши: Страницы истории, вопросы материальной духовной культуры [The Ingush: Pages of history, issues of material spiritual culture] (in Russian). Saratov: Detskaya kniga. pp. 1–122. ISBN 5-8270-0158-9.
- Muzhukhoev, M. B. (1998). "Изучение храма Алби-Ерды в Горной Ингушетии" [Exploring the Albi-Erdy Temple in Mountainous Ingushetia]. In Chakhkiev, D. Yu.; et al. (eds.). Новое в археологии и этнографии Ингушетии: Сборник статей [New in archeology and ethnography of Ingushetia: Collection of articles] (in Russian). Nalchik: El-Fa. pp. 5–14. ISBN 5-88195-312-6.

== Assessment ==
Russian historian Victor Schnirelmann wrote that:

Over the past fifteen years, a number of Orstkhoy intellectuals have done everything to revive the Orstkhoy identity. The head of the Department of History of the USSR at the Chechen-Ingush State University, archaeologist M.B. Muzhukhoev, was engaged in this with particular energy. He argued that the Orstkhoy were a separate Vainakh people and that, despite the assimilation processes of the 20th century, they retained their special identity.

== Bibliography ==
=== Russian sources ===
- Badzeeva, Elena (2004). Заслуженный деятель науки (Макшарип Багаудинович Мужухоев): Библиографический указатель [Honored Scientist (Maksharip Bagaudinovich Muzhukhoev): Bibliographic index]. Научная мысль Ингушетии (in Russian). Vol. 4. Ordzhonikidzevskaya: National Library of the Republic of Ingushetia. pp. 1–24.
- Goygova, R. "Биография Макшарипа Багаудиновича Мужухоева" [Biography of Makhsarip Bagaudinovich Muzhukhoev] (in Russian).
- Muzhukhoev, M. B. (1977). Pletneva, S. A. (ed.). Средневековая материальная культура горной Ингушетии (XIII—XVII вв.) [Medieval material culture of mountainous Ingushetia (13th to 17th centuries)] (in Russian). Grozny: Chech.-Ing. kn. izd-vo. pp. 1–180.
- Ozdoeva, M. (2022-12-26). "Умение видеть главное: К 80-летию со дня рождения ученого-археолога Макшарипа Мужухоева" [The ability to see the main point: On the 80th anniversary of the birth of archaeologist Maksharip Muzhukhoev]. Ingushetia (in Russian). GAU red. gazety "Ingushetia".
- Yandieva, А. И.; Khamkhoeva, А. З. (2022). "Жизнь, посвященная археологии (к 80-летию со дня рождения ингушского ученого Мужухоева Макшарипа Багаутдиновича)" [Life dedicated to archeology (on the 80th anniversary of the birth of the Ingush scientist Muzhukhoev Maksharip Bagautdinovich)]. Sovremennaya nauchnaya mysl (in Russian) (6). Moskva: ANO "Nauchno-issledovatelsky institut istorii, ekonomiki I prava": 241–246. doi:10.24412/2308-264X-2022-6-241-246. ISSN 2308-264X.
- Shnirelman, V. A. (2006). Kalinin, I. (ed.). Быть Аланами: Интеллектуалы и политика на Северном Кавказе в XX веке [To be Alans: Intellectuals and Politics in the North Caucasus in the 20th Century] (in Russian). Moskva: Novoe literaturnoe obozrenie. pp. 1–348. ISBN 5-86793-406-3. ISSN 1813-6583.
