= Dudayev (disambiguation) =

Dzhokhar Dudayev (1944–1996) was the first president of a declared independent Chechnya, now a part of Russia.

Dudayev may also refer to:

== People ==
- Alan Dudayev, Russian world champion in men's freestyle wrestling, 2005
- Aslambek Dudayev, Russian businessman and politician
- Dik Dudyaev, former manager of FC Akhmat Grozny
- Inal Dudayev, Russian soccer player on FC Alania-2 Vladikavkaz
- Lechi Dudayev, Chechen militant and former mayor of Grozny
- Yury Dudayev, Russian soccer player on PFC Dynamo Stavropol

=== Fictional characters ===
- Amira Dudayev, a character from 24: Legacy
- Ansore Dudayev, a character from Jack Ryan (TV series)
- Sergei Viktor "Serg" Dudayev, a character from Flight of the Endeavour; see List of fictional astronauts (modern period, works released 2000–2009)

== Other uses ==
- Dzhokhar Dudayev Battalion, part of the Free Chechen Army; also participating as part of the Ukrainian Foreign Legion in the 2022 Ukraine-Russia War
- Dudayev Park, Darıca, Kocaeli, Marmara, Turkiye
