= Grozny–Tuapse oil pipeline =

The Grozny–Tuapse oil pipeline is a 618 kilometres (384 mi) long pipeline connecting oil fields near Grozny, Russia, with the sea port Tuapse oil terminal.

== Background ==
The pipeline was launched in 1928, designed by Vladimir Shukhov. The annual throughput of the pipeline along with its 11 pumping stations was 1.5 million tons. It used 10 inches (250 mm) pipes, both welded and weldless. In 1938, oil extraction in Krasnodar territory near Maykop began. The main pipeline was used as a products pipeline, while its end part transported oil from the Krasnodar fields to Tuapse.

The pipeline was built in a move for the country to export as much oil as possible to bring in foreign currencies, as part of the First Five-Year Plan. Since 1894, the oil had been transported out of Grozny through train carriage.

== See also ==
- Timeline of Grozny
- Petroleum industry in Russia
