= Groznensky Rabochy =

Newspaper of the Chechen Republic

- Type: Weekly newspaper
- Editor-in-chief: Musa Muradov (1991-92, 1994-2001)
- Founded: 1917
- Ceased publication: 2001
- Language: Russian
- Headquarters: Grozny (1917-99); Nazran (1999-2001)

Groznensky Rabochy (Russian: Грозненский рабочий) was a Russian weekly newspaper based in Grozny, Chechnya from 1917 to 1992, and from 1994 to 2001.

== Post-Soviet era ==
During the Soviet Era, Groznensky Rabochy was then controlled by the Communist Party. After the 1991 dissolution of the Soviet Union, Grozny native Musa Muradov became the paper's editor-in-chief. However, Dzhokhar Dudayev, president of Chechnya's new, unrecognized secessionist government, soon attempted to make the paper an official publication of his party, and Muradov and most of his staff quit. Muradov briefly fled the violence of the First Chechen War with his family, but unable to find work in Moscow, returned to restart the paper in 1995.

== Refounding ==
Groznensky Rabochy resumed publishing as an independent newspaper in May 1995, again with Muradov as its editor-in-chief. The work was dangerous, as the staff was reporting and publishing in the combat zone of Grozny. On 1 August 1996, Ivan Gogun, one of the paper's reporters, was killed in a crossfire in the Third Battle of Grozny. Muradov himself was trapped in a basement by an artillery shell, remaining there for fourteen days.

The paper continued reporting through the Second Chechen War. Long-time Groznensky Rabochy correspondent Supian Ependiyev was killed covering the aftermath of a rocket attack on a Grozny bazaar on 27 October 1999; while he was conducting his interviews, a second round of rockets struck the bazaar, leaving him with fatal shrapnel injuries. At around this time, the paper was struggling financially, and its building was destroyed in Russian bombing. The staff relocated to Nazran in nearby Ingushetia, a federal subject of Russia that borders Chechnya. They nonetheless continued reporting on the conflict, shipping the paper back to Grozny on a weekly basis. They also took turns serving week-long shifts reporting from Grozny. According to Muradov, the Russian military had placed a number of restrictions on foreign journalists, limiting their access strictly to military bases and escorted routs, but as local Chechens, Muradov and his staff could evade these requirements and speak directly to Grozny's civilians.

By 2001, however, both sides of the conflict had grown angry with Groznensky Rabochy's attempted neutrality, perceiving it as an implied endorsement of the opposing side. The Nazran offices of Groznensky Rabochy were searched by Russia's Federal Security Service and Ministry of Internal Affairs, while Wahhabi Chechen extremists declared a sentence of death for the paper's staff under Sharia law and began a series of threatening phone calls to the office. Muradov again moved with his family to Moscow to avoid the threats, and the remainder of the Groznensky Rabochy staff spread out across Russia. With the staff disbanded, the paper soon went bankrupt.

== Recognition ==
In 2003, Muradov was awarded the International Press Freedom Award of the Committee to Protect Journalists, "an annual recognition of courageous journalism". The award citation praised Groznensky Rabochy as a "rare voice of reason" in the violence and distorted coverage of Chechnya, as well as Muradov's "refusal" to "become a mouthpiece for either side".
