= Ramzan Mezhidov =

Freelance Chechen cameraman

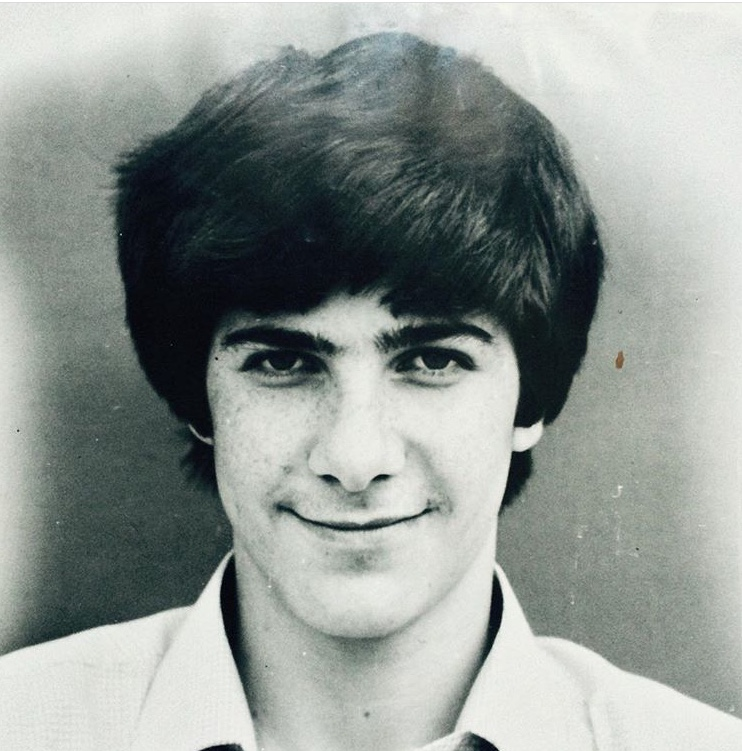

Ramzan Mezhidov (1967–1999), was a freelance Chechen cameraman. On October 29, 1999, together with Shamil Gigayev, a cameraman for independent Nokh Cho television station in Grozny, he was killed during a Russian air strike on refugees fleeing Chechnya.

Before working for Moscow-based Centre TV, Mezhidov had worked as a freelance for the German ARD between the Chechen conflicts. During the First Chechen War, Mezhidov had been a valuable asset to the Centre TV throughout the Northern Caucasus, particularly in the Republic of Dagestan.

On October 29, 1999, together with other journalists he was covering a large refugee convoy from Grozny to Nazran in neighboring Ingushetia en route along the Baku-Rostov highway. As the convoy approached the Chechen town of Shami-Yurt, a Russian fighter bomber fired several air-to-ground missiles, hitting a busload of refugees. Despite warnings from colleagues traveling with them, Mezhidov and Gigayev left their vehicle to film the carnage. As they approached the bus, another Russian rocket hit a nearby truck, fatally wounding both journalists. The Russian air force pilot reportedly saw Mezhidov with a television camera on the aircraft's second run and fired at him. It is unclear whether the pilot believed his camera to be a weapon or was trying to prevent him from filming. Mezhidov was not killed immediately but mortally wounded and left on the road. He was eventually taken to hospital in Urus-Martan where he died from shock and blood loss.
