= Baku–Rostov highway bombing =

1999 airstrike

- Location: near Shami-Yurt, Chechnya
- Date: October 29, 1999
- Target: Refugee and Red Cross convoy, Baku-Rostov highway
- Attack type: Indiscriminate bombing
- Deaths: Some 25 civilians according to the Red Cross; 16 according to the Russian government
- Injuries: Over 70
- Perpetrator: Russian Air Force

The Baku–Rostov highway bombing was an incident which occurred near the village of Shaami-Yurt in Chechnya, on October 29, 1999. Two low-flying Russian aircraft carried out repeated rocket attacks on a large convoy of refugees trying to enter the Russian republic of Ingushetia through a supposed "safe exit" route. The attacks killed or injured scores of people.

== Incident ==
The incident took place after it was officially announced that the border between Chechnya and Ingushetia would re-open following a week's closure. However, the convoy of more than 1,000 vehicles heading to safety was not permitted to cross the border and ordered to turn back by an unidentified senior Russian military officer (the area was under responsibility of Gen. Vladimir Shamanov), and subsequently attacked on their way back to the besieged Chechen capital Grozny.

According to the Amnesty International report, "at the time of the Russian attacks there were no legitimate military targets in the area. Eyewitness accounts of this incident would seem to indicate that the Russian forces had deliberately targeted civilians and civilian objects, despite some of them being marked with the Red Cross emblem, in violation of international humanitarian law."

The victims included local International Red Cross and Red Crescent Movement workers, two killed Chechen journalists (including Ramzan Mezhidov), and numerous women and children, some of them reportedly burned alive while trapped in their vehicles. Russian authorities have at first officially denied responsibility, and the later military investigations were not meaningful.

== Similar incidents ==
A similar aerial attack on a large column of refugees fleeing Grozny fighting took place in August 1996. A number of other attacks on "humanitarian corridor" refugee convoys and foot columns were also reported later in 1999-2000, including a December 3 incident in which about 40 people were shot to death at a Russian police checkpoint. In 2008 a suspected mass grave of some 300 persons was uncovered near Grozny, likely containing remains of victims of an artillery attack on a "green corridor" in October 1999.

== ECHR judgement ==
On February 24, 2005, the European Court of Human Rights found Russia guilty of violation of the right to life and other human rights violations in the case of the attack on the "safe passage" convoy after a joint complaint was submitted to the Court by three various survivors in 2003, summing up the established facts in its verdict:

183. The applicants, Red Cross workers and other witnesses to the attack unanimously testified about being aware in advance of the "safe passage" or "humanitarian corridor" to Ingushetia for the Grozny residents on 29 October 1999. This exit was prepared and foreseen by the residents fleeing from heavy fighting. They collected their belongings and arranged for transportation in advance, and started early in the morning of 29 October 1999 in order to reach safety. The first and second applicants and their families arranged for a minivan with a driver. They submitted that on 28 October 1999 they attempted to cross the administrative border, but the military at the roadblock ordered them to return the next day. The third applicant and her family had been waiting since 26 October 1999 for the announced "safe exit" in the village of Gekhi, because the shelling of Grozny had become too severe (see §§ 14-16 above). Ms Burdynyuk and her husband were aware of the "corridor" and ordered in advance a truck from a transport agency to take them and their household items out (see § 55 above). The Red Cross workers testified that they planned the evacuation of the offices for 29 October 1999 to benefit from the announced "safe passage", of which they had informed their headquarters in Nalchik and obtained a permit to travel from the local [Chechen] rebel commander (see §§ 46-48 above).

184. The presence of a substantial number of civilian cars and thousands of people on the road on that day is further confirmed by the statements of the applicants and the statements by the Red Cross workers and other witnesses, who testified that there had been a line of cars several kilometres long. The Government in their submission of 28 March 2003 explained that on 29 October 1999 the roadblock "Kavkaz-1" on the administrative border between Chechnya and Ingushetia had been closed, because it could not cope with the substantial number of refugees wishing to cross (see § 26 above).

185. The applicants and the Red Cross workers refer to an order from a senior military officer at the roadblock to clear the road and to return to Grozny, which came at round 11 a.m. It appears that the civilians in the convoy were fearful for their safety on the return journey, and they referred to assurances of security given by that senior officer (see §§ 17 and 48 above). As the applicants and other witnesses submit, the order to return caused a traffic jam on the road, filled with cars, buses and trucks. Some had to wait as long as about an hour to be able to start moving and the progress was very slow, at least initially (see §§ 17, 18 and 48 above).

186. All this should have been known to the authorities who were planning military operations on 29 October 1999 anywhere near the Rostov-Baku highway and should have alerted them to the need for extreme caution as regards the use of lethal force.

187. It transpires from the testimony given by the air controller identified as "Sidorov" that he was given the mission order for 29 October 1999 on the previous evening. The mission was to prevent movement of heavy vehicles towards Grozny in order to cut supplies to the insurgents defending the city. Neither he, nor, apparently, the pilots had been informed of the announcements of a "safe passage" for that day, of which the civilians were keenly aware. Nor had they been alerted at any moment by the military manning the "Kavkaz-1" roadblock to the massive presence of refugees on the road, moving towards Grozny on their orders (see § 79-80 above).

188. It appears from the air controller's evidence that forward air controllers are normally taken on board when a mission is perceived as taking place close to federal positions. The absence of a forward air controller on the mission of 29 October 1999 meant that, in order to receive permission to use weapons, the pilots had to communicate with a controller at the control centre, who could not see the road and could not be involved in any independent evaluation of the targets.

189. All this had placed the civilians on the road, including the applicants, at a very high risk of being perceived as suitable targets by the military pilots.

190. The pilots in their testimonies presented to the Court submitted that they had attacked two solitary Kamaz trucks on the stretch of road between Shaami-Yurt and Kulary villages, which are about 12 kilometres apart. They stated that at that time the road was empty save for these two trucks. No questions were put to them to explain the civilian casualties (see §§ 81-85 above). From the document dated 5 May 2004 it appears that at some point after March 2003 the pilots were questioned again, and submitted that after they had fired at the first truck another truck appeared out of the forest and drove into the impact radius of the missile (see §§ 92-93 above).

191. The air controller in his testimony stated that he had not been aware of any civilian casualties until the day of the interview, i.e. until a year after the incident (see § 79 above). The Court finds this difficult to accept, because the Red Cross immediately communicated information about the casualties to the relevant authorities, which had already in November 1999 started some form of investigation of the incident. The press release from the Russian military air force announced the destruction of a column of trucks with fighters and ammunition on the road towards Grozny on 29 October 1999 and denied the allegations that civilians could have been injured by the air strikes (see § 32 above).

192. The Court finds insurmountable the discrepancy between the two pilots' and the air controller's testimonies that the aircraft directed their missiles at isolated trucks and the victims' numerous submissions about the circumstances of the attack. The Government explained the casualties by submitting that in the very short time between firing of the missiles at the trucks and the moment they hit them, the convoy, previously unseen by the pilots, appeared on the road and was affected due to the wide impact radius of the missiles used. The Court does not accept this reasoning, which does not begin to explain the sudden appearance of such a large number of vehicles and persons on the road at the time. Moreover, the Government's contentions are contradicted by a substantial mass of other evidence presented to the Court.

193. First, it follows from the witnesses' accounts that several vehicles in the convoy were directly hit by the explosions – the Mercedes truck used by the Red Cross, the cabin of which had been destroyed, the PAZ bus and a Kamaz truck filled with refugees. The third applicant submits that her GAZ car with possessions was destroyed by a direct hit. This excludes accidental damage by shrapnel due to a large impact radius.

194. Second, the applicants, the Red Cross workers and other witnesses submitted that the attacks were not momentaneous, but lasted for several hours, possibly as many as four. The pilots and the air controller gave the timing of the first attack as about 2.05 - 2.15 p.m., but they failed to indicate, even approximately, the timing of the second attack. In their submissions on the admissibility of the applications, the Government indicated the timing of the attack as 2.05 – 2.20 p.m. and 3.30 – 3.35 p.m. (see § 28). Assuming that the initial missile was fired about 2 p.m. at what the pilots had perceived as a "solitary" vehicle on an otherwise empty road, further launches, which took place at least an hour and a half later, could not have failed to take into account other vehicles. It is established that, during that quite significant stretch of time, the pilots made several passes over the road, descending and ascending from 200 to 2000 metres. They had the benefit of good visibility conditions and thus could not have failed to see the numerous cars on the road. The air force press release, issued soon after the events, spoke of a "column of trucks with fighters and ammunition" and not of two solitary vehicles (see § 32 above).

195. The military used an extremely powerful weapon for whatever aims they were trying to achieve. According to the conclusions of the domestic investigation, 12 S-24 non-guided air-to-ground missiles were fired, six by each plane, which is a full load. On explosion, each missile creates several thousand pieces of shrapnel and its impact radius exceeds 300 metres (or 600-800 metres, as suggested by some documents – see §§ 30 and 88 above). There were thus several explosions on a relatively short stretch of the road filled with vehicles. Anyone who had been on the road at that time would have been in mortal danger.

196. The question of the exact number of casualties remains open, but there is enough evidence before the Court to suggest that in these circumstances it could be significantly higher than the figures reached by the domestic investigation. The Court also bears in mind the report produced by Human Rights Watch concerning this and other incidents where civilians were attacked when fleeing from fighting. The Court does not find any difference between the situations of the three applicants in view of the level of danger to which they were exposed.

197. The question of the apparent disproportionality in the weapons used was also raised by the Bataysk Garrison Court in its decision of 14 March 2003, by which the decision to close the investigation was quashed and a new investigation ordered.

198. In addition, the fact that the Government failed to invoke the provisions of domestic legislation at any level which would govern the use of force by the army or security forces in situations such as the present one, while not in itself sufficient to decide on a violation of the positive obligation of the State to protect the right to life, in the circumstances of the present case is also directly relevant to the proportionality of the response to the alleged attack (see, mutatis mutandis, the above-mentioned McCann judgment, § 156).

199. To sum up, even assuming that the military were pursuing a legitimate aim in launching 12 S-24 non-guided air-to-ground missiles on 29 October 1999, the Court does not accept that the operation near the village of Shaami-Yurt was planned and executed with the requisite care for the lives of the civilian population.
