= Timeline of Makhachkala =

The following is a timeline of the history of the city of Makhachkala, Dagestan, Russia.

== 19th century ==
- 1844 - Anji Fortress built by Russians.
- 1852 - Petrovsky lighthouse built.
- 1857 - Petrovsk-Port granted town status.
- 1870 - Harbor constructed.
- 1896 - Rostov-Baku railway built.
- 1897 - Population: 9,806.

== 20th century ==
- 1919
  - No. 221 Squadron RAF and No. 266 Squadron RAF of the United Kingdom based in Petrovsk.
  - Population: 18,000.
- 1920 - 30 March: Red Army takes city.
- 1921 - 14 May: City becomes capital of Dagestan Autonomous Soviet Socialist Republic.
- 1922 - Petrovsk renamed "Makhachkala."
- 1925 - Russian Drama Theatre established.
- 1927 - Dynamo Stadium (Makhachkala) opens.
- 1931 - Teachers' Training Institute founded.
- 1932 - Dagestankaya Pravda newspaper in publication.
- 1937 - "Tanker basin" built.
- 1939 - Population: 86,836.
- 1944 - Spiritual Directorate of the Muslims of the North Caucasus headquartered in Makhachkala (approximate date).
- 1946 - Football Club Dynamo Makhachkala formed.
- 1957 - Dagestan State University established.
- 1958 - Dagestan Museum of Fine Arts opens.
- 1965 - Population: 152,000.
- 1970
  - 14 May: Earthquake.
  - Population: 185,863.
- 1980 - Mountain Botanical Garden of the Dagestan Scientific Centre established.
- 1985 - Population: 301,000.
- 1990 - Dagestan Scientific Centre established.
- 1991
  - City becomes capital of the Dagestan Republic.
  - Football Club Anzhi Makhachkala formed.
  - 13 June: Muslim demonstration.
- 1995 - Football Club Anzhi-Bekenez Makhachkala formed.
- 1996 - August: Bombing.
- 1998
  - Said Amirov becomes mayor.
  - Makhachkala Grand Mosque consecrated.

== 21st century ==
- 2001 - November: Trial of Salman Raduyev begins.
- 2002
  - 18 January: Bombing.
  - Population: 462,412.
- 2003 - Chernovik newspaper begins publication.
- 2005 - 1 July: Makhachkala Rus bombing.
- 2006 - City flag and coat of arms designs adopted.
- 2009 - 15 January: Aircraft collision.
- 2010 - Population: 572,076.
- 2011
  - 22 November: Bombings.
  - 25 November: Protest.
- 2012 - 3 May: Bombings.
- 2013 - 1 June: Mayor Said Amirov arrested.
- 2018-Khabib Nurmagomedov becomes ufc lightweight champ
- 2023 anti-Jewish unrest in the North Caucasus

== See also ==
- History of Makhachkala
- Administrative divisions of Makhachkala
- History of Dagestan
- History of the Jews in Makhachkala
- Timelines of other cities in the North Caucasian Federal District of Russia: Grozny

== Bibliography ==
- "Petrowsk". Brockhaus' Konversations-Lexikon (in German) (14th ed.). Leipzig: Brockhaus. 1908.
- "Petrovsk (Daghestan)" . Encyclopædia Britannica. Vol. 21 (11th ed.). 1910. p. 335.
- "Petrovsk", Russia, Leipzig: Karl Baedeker, 1914, OCLC 1328163
- "Caucasus: Makhachkala", Russia, Ukraine & Belarus, Lonely Planet, 1996, p. 656+, OL 16478112W
- Svetlana Anokhina and Polina Sanaeva, ed. (2013). Был такой Город: Махачкала [There Was a City: Makhachkala] (in Russian). Dagestan.
