= Chechen =

Chechen may refer to:

- Chechens, an ethnic group of the Caucasus
- Chechen language, Northeast Caucasian language
- Metopium brownei, also known as the chechen, chechem, or black poisonwood tree
- Related to Chechnya (Chechen Republic), a republic within Russia
- Related to the former Chechen Republic of Ichkeria

== See also ==
- Ichkeria (disambiguation)
