= Moscow refinery =

Oil refinery in Moscow, Russia

Moscow Refinery
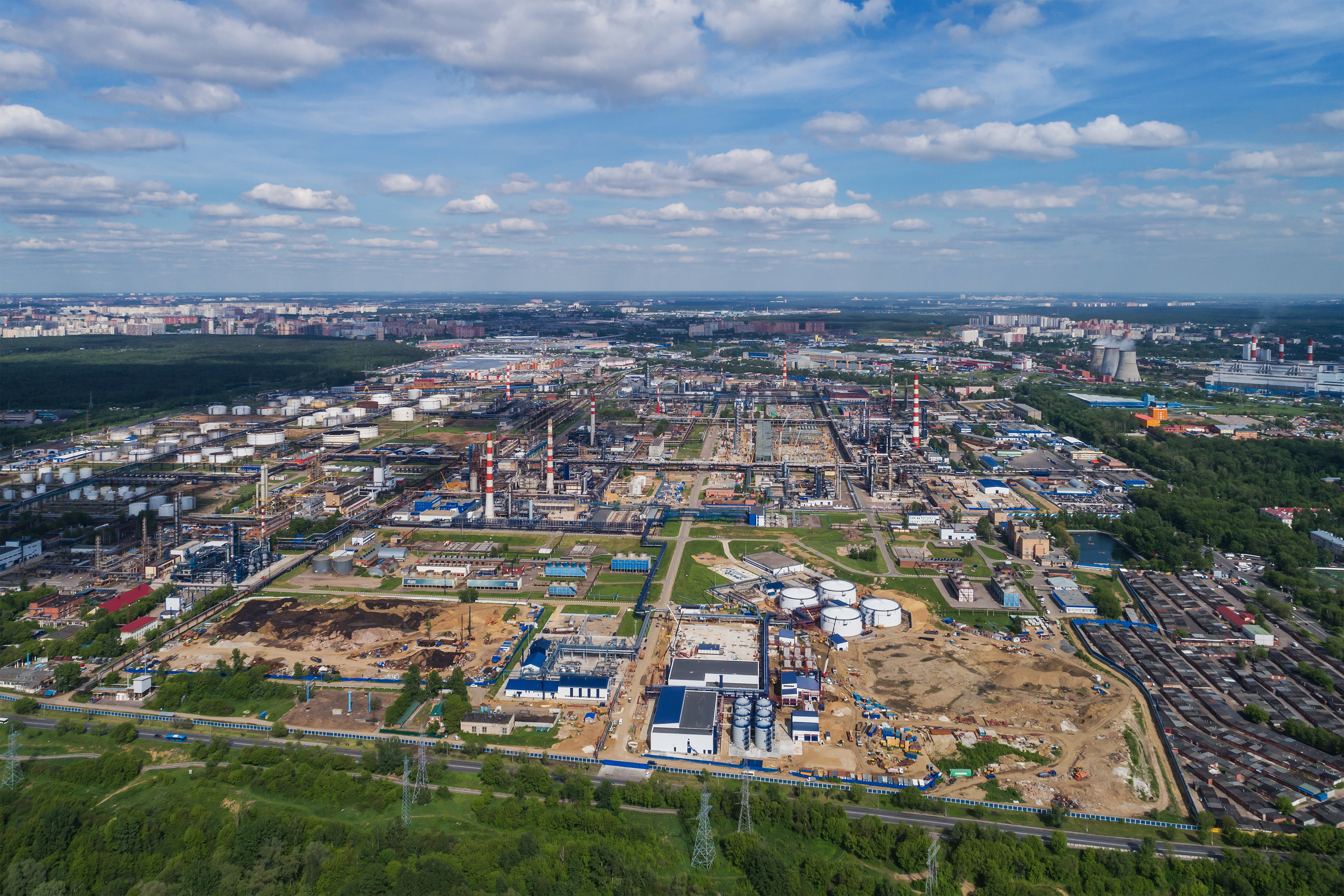

- Location within Moscow Ring Road Location within European Russia
- Interactive map of Moscow Refinery
- Location: Moscow; 55°39′00″N 37°48′36″E

Refinery details
- Operator: Gazprom
- Opened: 1938
- No. of employees: ~2,200
- Website: mnpz.gazprom-neft.ru

The Moscow Refinery (Russian: Московский нефтеперерабатывающий завод, МНПЗ, romanized: Moskovskiy neftepererabatyvayushchiy zavod, MNPZ, lit. 'Moscow Oil Refinery Plant') is an oil refinery plant in the southeast of the Russian capital of Moscow. It is also known as the Kapotnya Refinery, after the Kapotnya District in which it is located. This refinery has belonged to the Russian state-owned company Gazprom since 2011.

In June 2026, the refinery was heavily damaged during a large-scale wave of Ukrainian long-range drone attacks on Moscow, with additional damage caused by Russian air-defence operations. The damage forced the refinery to suspend operations, with production not expected to resume until 2027. Following the attack, reports of "black rain" emerged from parts of Moscow.

== History ==
=== Soviet era ===
Soviet industrialization in the 1930s meant that more oil refineries were needed to fill the increased need for fuel. In 1936, the People's Commissariat of Heavy Industry approved the construction of a new refinery near the Moskva River in the Moscow area, which began operation in 1938.

On the Eastern Front of World War II, the refinery was crucial to the Soviet war effort because it provided crucial fuel supplies for the Soviet military. Some of the facilities were moved to Siberia or Central Asia to prevent capture by Nazi forces. The Luftwaffe bombed the refinery frequently because of its importance to the war effort. The Soviets constructed a decoy refinery about 3km east of the real plant to protect the plant from bombing. Between 1941 and 1945, the refinery processed an estimated 2.8 million tons of oil.

In August 1960, a decree from the Presidium of Soviet Russia incorporated the refinery plant into the administrative boundaries of the city of Moscow.

Throughout the 1960s and 1970s, new units were added to the refinery to expand the production range, including for dehydrogenation, producing diesel fuel, polypropylene, and catalytic reforming. After this modernization process, the refinery's capacity rose to about 12 million tons of oil per year.

=== Russian Federation ===
In 1994, the refinery was organized into a joint-stock company during the privatization initiatives following the devolution of the Soviet Union. The plant was jointly operated by Sibir Energy and the Russian government.

In March 1998, a fire broke out at the refinery, which destroyed a refining unit.

In 2011, the state-owned Gazprom acquired Sibir Energy and the refinery became entirely state-owned.

==== Russo-Ukrainian war ====
Moscow Refinery on fire, 18 June 2026

On 1 September 2024, during the Russo-Ukrainian war, a fire broke out at the refinery, after reports of a massive Ukrainian drone attack.

On 16 June 2026, the refinery was set on fire by Ukrainian "FP-1, Liutyi, and Shahed-type drones".

On the morning of 18 June, the refinery was subject to one of the largest drone and missile strikes of the Russia-Ukraine war, with dozens of drones hitting the complex causing multiple fires to break out in multiple units and storage tanks of the refinery, as well as around the refinery, including at a nearby shopping market. The upper floors of a multi-story residential building were impacted in the attack, but it is unclear if by Ukrainian attack drone or a Russian air defense missile. Russian officials claimed that 17 people were injured, including two children. Around the same time, Ukrainian Armed Forces attacked the refinery again using long-range UAVs, causing flames and thick plumes of black smoke to rise from the burning oil depots, darkening the Moscow skyline. Black rain was reported in Moscow. A roof from a large storage tank was seen flying into the air amid an explosion, reportedly as the result of a Russian air defense missile. Reuters reported that the refinery's operations would be stopped until 2027 after the strike.

On 20 September 2026, as part of a series of major drone attacks on Moscow, the Kapotnya refinery was struck again, with multiple fires, and smoke rising that could be seen across the city. Moscow's mayor, Sergey Sobyanin, described the drone raid as the "largest ever", while stating that Russian air defenses intercepted over 1,600 drones in the previous day, 450 of which were aimed for Moscow.

== See also ==
- List of oil refineries
- Petroleum industry in Russia
