= Tuapse refinery =

Oil refinery in Tuapse, Russia

Tuapse Refinery
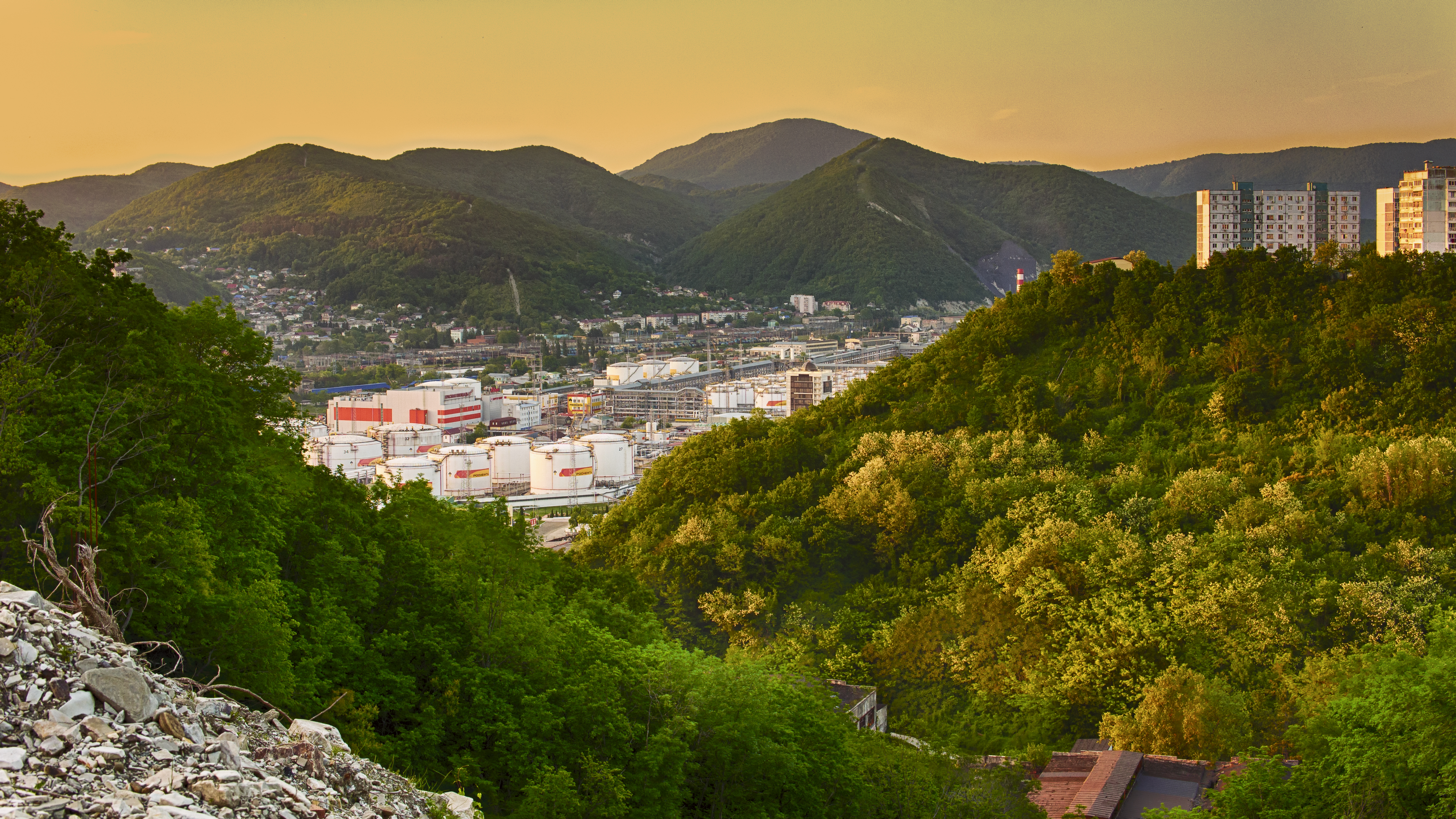

- Location within Krasnodar Krai Location within European Russia
- Interactive map of Tuapse Refinery
- Location: Tuapse, Russia; 44°06′15″N 39°05′55″E

Refinery details
- Operator: Rosneft
- Opened: 1958
- No. of employees: ~2,400
- Website: nnos.lukoil.ru

The Tuapse Refinery (Russian: Туапсинский нефтеперерабатывающий завод) is an oil refinery in the Russian city of Tuapse. It has belonged to the Russian state-owned company Rosneft since 1992.

== History ==
In 2013 a new unit at the refinery began service to expand the production capacity. In 2014, six new hydrocracking units were introduced, and the products would fulfill European emission standards. A similar unit was introduced in 2015, which produces diesel fuel based on European standards.

=== Russo-Ukrainian war ===
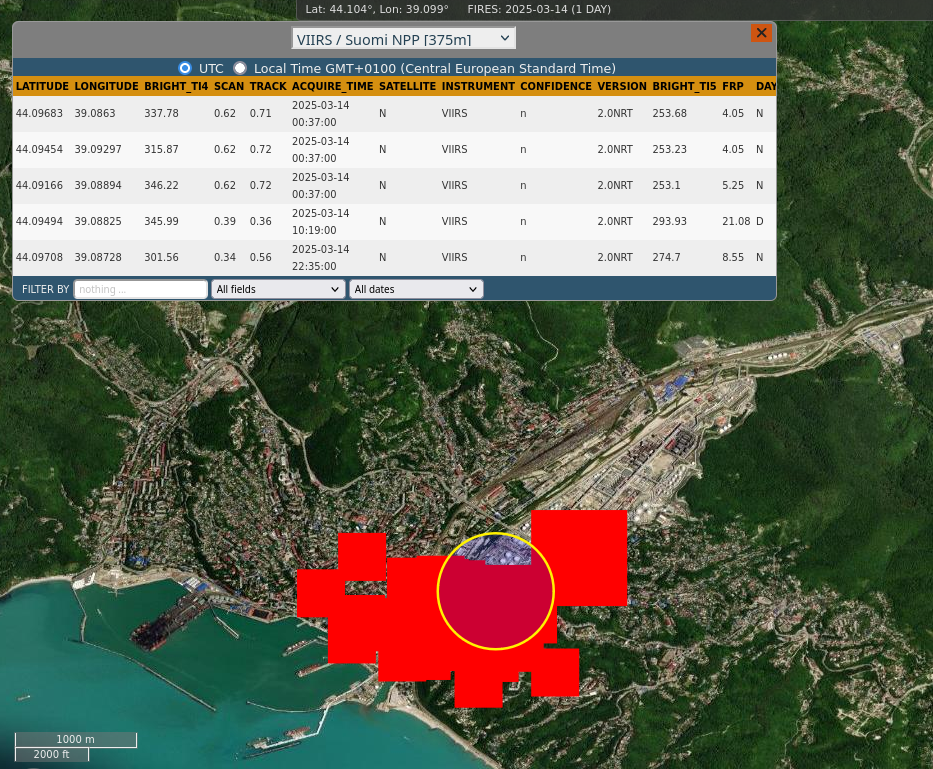
A refinery fire was detected by NASA's FIRMS at 00:37 (UTC) on March 14, 2025

During the Russo-Ukrainian war, the Ukrainian military conducted numerous attacks on Russian targets, especially oil refineries. The Tuapse refinery was struck on January 25, 2024, and again on May 17. The refinery had to cease operations after the January 2024 attack. On March 14, 2025, the refinery was struck again by Ukrainian drones, causing a reportedly 1,000 square meter fire detected by NASA's FIRMS. On November 2, 2025, the Tuapse oil terminal that serves the refinery was attacked by drones and caught fire.

Further attacks took place in 2026, causing fires. Reuters reported that two unnamed industry sources has told them that the attacks on April 16 had put the port out of operation, which in turn meant the refinery ceased to operate due to inability to ship its outputs.

== See also ==
- List of oil refineries
- Petroleum industry in Russia
