= Eduard Lusikyan =

Russian footballer

Personal information
- Full name: Eduard Sebovich Lusikyan
- Date of birth: 29 February 1984 (age 42)
- Place of birth: Tuapse, Krasnodar Krai, Russian SFSR
- Height: 1.73 m (5 ft 8 in)
- Position: Midfielder

Youth career
- DYuSSh-7 Sochi

Senior career*
Years	Team	Apps	(Gls)
2002–2003	FC Zhemchuzhina Sochi	65	(5)
2005	FC Sochi-04	9	(0)
2005–2006	FC Volgar-Gazprom Astrakhan	13	(1)
2007–2009	FC Gazovik Orenburg	81	(9)
2010	FC Mordovia Saransk	9	(1)
2011–2013	FC Torpedo Armavir	69	(6)
2014–2016	FC Chernomorets Novorossiysk	45	(6)
2016	FC Chayka Peschanokopskoye	12	(1)
2017–2020	FC Armavir	85	(7)
- * Club domestic league appearances and goals

Eduard Sebovich Lusikyan (Russian: Эдуард Себович Лусикян; born 29 February 1984) is a Russian former professional football player.

== Club career ==
After beginning his career with FC Zhemchuzhina Sochi, Lusikyan joined Russian Football National League side FC Volgar-Gazprom Astrakhan in 2005. He made his FNL debut for Volgar-Gazprom on 4 September 2005 in a game against FC Chkalovets-1936 Novosibirsk.
