= Grozny ballistic missile attack =

1999 Russian ballistic missile attack in Chechnya

- Part of the Second Chechen War
- Location: Grozny, Chechnya
- Date: October 21, 1999
- Target: Various civilian and government/military targets
- Attack type: Ballistic missile strike
- Deaths: Est. more than 100 instantly
- Injuries: About 250 to over 400

The Grozny ballistic missile attack was a wave of Russian ballistic missile strikes on the Chechen capital Grozny on October 21, 1999, early in the Second Chechen War. The attack killed at least 118 people according to initial reports, mostly civilians, or at least 137 immediate dead according to the HALO Trust count. Hundreds of people were also injured, many of whom later died.

== The attack ==
The first reports from the region suspected the use of Scud missiles (SS-1). The hypersonic missiles, ten in number according to Chechen officials (other sources reported less), fell without warning, as the Chechen air defense systems had been destroyed in the earlier Russian air strikes. The explosions occurred at around 18:15 hours in several areas of the capital, mostly in the downtown area including the crowded, central outdoor marketplace.

Two of the missiles exploded outside the city's only functioning maternity hospital, which was located near Aslan Maskhadov's presidential palace building (the palace itself was not damaged in the attack), and near the city's main post office. Another missile hit the mosque in the village of Kalinina, a suburb of Grozny. According to official Chechen sources, about 30–35 people died at the hospital; a correspondent for the AFP counted 27 bodies, most of them women and newborn babies. Most of the casualties from the post office strike seemed to have been people waiting for public transport outside the building, as several buses were at the stop at the moment of the explosion. In the Kalinina mosque, some 41 people who had gathered for evening prayer were said to have been killed.

Most of the casualties occurred at the central market, which was filled with hundreds of shoppers at the time of the attack. The victims were not limited to Chechens, but included also many ethnic Russians and others. A rain of large ball-shaped shrapnel from the cluster munition airbursts showered the market, nearby streets, and open-air cafés, with each blast affecting a large area. According to an investigation by Human Rights Watch, the first explosion hit a building about 50 yards (46 m) northeast of the bazaar at the corner of the city's main Prospekt Svobody and Mira streets, and adjacent to a city bus caught in traffic. However, most of the marketplace deaths came from the second and third explosions, which occurred within 100 yards of each other in the central bazaar area, "near the flowers and confectionery stalls." According to the Radio Free Europe/Radio Liberty correspondent Andrei Babitsky, the worst hit area was the so-called kolkhoz sector of the market, located near the building of the Chechen military headquarters. Reuters reporter Maria Eismont counted at least 90 bodies on the scene, while the local AFP correspondent said he witnessed 17 corpses recovered from the market. Some time afterwards, another missile fell about 200 meters from the bazaar, claiming the life of Supian Ependiyev, the first journalist to be killed while covering the Second Chechen War.

=== Aftermath ===
Many of the blasts' victims were brought to the central Grozny hospital, where doctors operated without electricity. Some of the hundreds of injured, about 100 of them in a critical state, were immediately evacuated across the border to the neighboring republic of Ingushetia that same night. Others were taken across one or two days later, and ambulances faced lengthy delays at roadblocks when the Russian troops attempted to seal the border. The attacks unleashed widespread panic in Grozny and a new wave of thousands of refugees headed for Ingushetia. More than 177,000 refugees had already fled the fighting. Russia closed the border; one of the refugee convoys from Grozny was bombed after being turned back. The city's streets were reported to be largely empty after the attack, as those residents who had not yet fled were too scared to venture outside. Two weeks later, Chechen separatist officials gave an updated death toll of more than 280 people.

There were further reports of tactical missiles being used on Grozny as the Russian Ground Forces were besieging and shelling the city. For example, in an attack on October 27–28, the homes of field commanders Shamil Basayev and Arbi Barayev and of the former acting president Zelimkhan Yandarbiyev were destroyed, as were numerous civilian buildings (at least five multi-flat houses, one five-storied apartment building and many smaller houses) and a busy taxi parking. Basayev himself said that he had created a special unit of suicide fighters to carry out "acts of sabotage" in retaliation for the market attack. Basayev and the formation, named Riyadus-Salikhin Reconnaissance and Sabotage Battalion of Chechen Martyrs, took responsibility for a series of suicide bombing and mass hostage taking incidents over the next five years, culminating in the disastrous Beslan school hostage crisis in September 2004 that claimed more than 300 victims.

== Responsibility for the attack and the question of its legality ==
The attack was met with an official denial on the part of the Russian authorities, who insisted that no civilians died in the blasts and provided a number of widely varying and conflicting alternative explanations. Despite an early admission by Aleksandr Veklich, a Russian military spokesman in the region, that the market (Russian officials typically characterised the marketplace as "an ammunition market" and "terrorist headquarters") was destroyed in a "special operation in which no artillery or aircraft were involved", Russian prime minister Vladimir Putin claimed that the explosions were the results of a "clash between gangs" and denied information that the Russian forces were involved in any way in the events in Grozny. In this version, Putin was joined by the army general Vladislav Putilin, who was quoted as saying that "the military forces have nothing to do with that affair". Another official, the chief of the Center of Public Relations of the FSB, Aleksandr Zdanovitch, alleged a self-explosion of the ammunition stored there "because the terrorists thought there would be no air or artillery strikes at the place of large concentrations of people". In another conflicting version, provided by the First Deputy Chief of the Russian General Staff of the Armed Forces, General Valery Manilov spoke about "a rapid special operation, independent of the regular armed forces" that "resulted in a conflict between two large bandit groups which had been enemies for a long time". This confrontation supposedly led to an accidental explosion of "one large ammunition depot" during the alleged fighting in that area. Later, some Russian officials actually suggested "a terrorist act prepared by the terrorists themselves" and the press office of the Russian Defense Ministry even called anyone who blamed Russia for the massacre "a liar", accusing the reporters at the scene of "misleading international public opinion".

According to a report by the Russian human rights organization Memorial who had analyzed the television footage of the aftermath, an explosion of "one or several compact powerful explosive mechanisms" at ground level in this case is out of the question, as all the vertical elements in the rows of stalls remained standing, while the horizontal ones (tents and overhead covers) were destroyed and broken. In addition, those who were not protected by overhead cover received multiple fragmentation wounds, and the foreground showed the characteristic traces of cassette (cluster) ammunition of so-called "ball bombs" (munitions used in the Tochka missile warheads and intended for destruction of non-protected live forces in large areas). Finally, apparent fragments of "enormous" ground-to-ground missiles and cluster sub-munition canisters were found at the scene (as reported by Babitsky). There were also reports in the Russian media on the use of cassette tactical missiles against "terrorists" in Chechnya earlier that month, which were corroborated by the refugees. "The mosque and the maternity home, about which the Russian officials have chosen to keep silent, are undoubtedly civil objects, the attack of which is explicitly prohibited," Memorial added.

According to Human Rights Watch, the possibility of arms merchants or military installations in the bazaar did not justify "the tremendous amount of force" used against the market in a strike which may have been illegal. In its report titled Evidence of War Crimes in Chechnya, the watchdog concluded: "Although there is some evidence that there may have been legitimate military targets located near or within the Grozny bazaar, the size and extent of the blasts, combined with the large number of noncombatants in the immediate vicinity, strongly suggests that the Russian attack was grossly disproportionate. If Chechen commander Shamil Basayev did indeed situate his headquarters within the Grozny market, that too would be a serious abuse of international law. Although Chechen fighters are not parties to the Geneva Conventions, as individuals within the territory of a state party [Russia], they are bound to respect the basic precept of civilian immunity. Human Rights Watch calls upon Chechen commanders to immediately redeploy their troops, headquarters, and weapons storage facilities out of populated areas."

According to the HALO Trust, "Grozny market ... is a great sprawling area of wooden stalls laid out each morning and packed away in the evenings. It is the equivalent of all your department stores rolled into one. Thus you can buy fresh bread, a TV set, a wedding dress, a bag of nails, and an AK-47 in one open area the size of a couple of sports fields. Each section is clearly marked and the area where weapons are sold is very small and set right against the edge. The center of destruction was some 150 m away from the area set aside for selling weapons. It was right over the clothes and food section. With the use of such munitions in such an area it was impossible not to have foreseen massive collateral damage.

A study by the Foreign Military Studies Office evaluated: "In a surprising and threatening move, the federal forces relied heavily on fuel-air explosives and tactical missiles (SCUD and SCARAB). (...) Such strikes were designed for maximum psychological pressure—to demonstrate the hopelessness of further resistance against a foe that could strike with impunity and that was invulnerable to countermeasures." Major General Vladimir Shamanov, Russia's commander in Chechnya, said the decision to attack was made at the highest level ("the very top" and "the highest chief"), meaning at least knowledge by Vladimir Putin and President Yeltsin. The same opinion was voiced by the president of Ingushetia, Ruslan Aushev. According to Aushev, a retired Red Army general and a veteran of the Soviet–Afghan War, in all probability the missiles had been fired from the base of the 58th Army near the village of Tarskoye in North Ossetia.

== World reaction ==
European Union : The President of the European Parliament, Lord Russell-Johnston, expressed shock at the death toll and accused the Russian government of human rights violations and lawbreaking. The President of the European Union, Paavo Lipponen of Finland, said the group was "deeply worried about the deteriorating situation" in Chechnya. Chancellor of Germany, Gerhard Schröder condemned the "massacre on the Grozny marketplace," and German politicians urged sanctions against Russia. European leaders also demanded Putin put forward a plan to end the war in Chechnya.

United Nations : UN Secretary-General Kofi Annan issued a statement in which he expressed his "strong hope that special care is taken to avoid innocent civilian casualties in the current conflict and that the provisions of humanitarian law in armed conflict are respected."

United States : The White House spokesman Joe Lockhart said that there were conflicting reports and statements about the blasts, but "what's clear is that there's a tragic situation there with terrible loss of life." U.S. Secretary of State Madeleine Albright called the incident "deplorable and ominous" and said that the Russians should have learnt in their previous war in Chechnya that "this kind of violence is not a solution".

Amnesty International declared that "even assuming that these weapons [being sold at several stalls in one corner of the market] were indeed the target of the attack, the use by Russian forces of high explosive weapons in a market place crowded with civilians suggests that this attack may have been indiscriminate within the meaning of Article 51 of Protocol I Additional to the Geneva Conventions, to which the Russian Federation is a party, and therefore a grave breach of this Protocol." Regarding this and other incidents of civilian casualties in Chechnya, the organization called on Russia to cease carrying out such attacks in its offensive. They also demanded vetting targets for military significance, warning civilians of attacks if possible, stopping attacks if they turned out to be against civilians or disproportionate to military objectives, and investigating attacks against civilians with the help of international investigators.

The Committee to Protect Journalists protested the death of Supian Ependiyev in an open letter to President Yeltsin, while Human Rights Watch said the assault "may have been a serious violation of the laws of war" and urged the Russian authorities to vigorously investigate the incident and publish their findings.

== See also ==
- 1995 Shali cluster bomb attack
- Battle of Grozny (1999-2000)
- Bombing of Katyr-Yurt
- Russian war crimes
- Elistanzhi cluster bomb attack
- OTR-21 Tochka
- Second Chechen War crimes and terrorism
- Terror bombing
- 1999 Grozny refugee convoy shooting
- Baku-Rostov highway bombing
