= 2004 Grozny raid =

Terrorist incident in Russia

Coordinates: 43.316°N 45.683°E

2004 raid on Grozny
- Part of Second Chechen War
Date	August 21–22, 2004
Location	Grozny, Chechnya
Result	Russian victory; Chechen militants pushed back into the forests

Belligerents
Russia: Chechnya	Chechen separatists

Commanders and leaders
Movladi Baisarov and others	Doku Umarov and others

Strength
Several thousand	250–400

Casualties and losses
At least 32 policemen and militiamen and 5 soldiers killed	At least 20 fighters killed
- At least 13 civilians killed

2004 raid on Grozny (August 21–22, 2004) was a series of overnight attacks in central Grozny, capital of Chechnya. It was carried out by Chechen insurgents. Aslan Maskhadov is considered the inspiration and ideological leader behind these attacks, while the commanders on the ground were Dokka Umarov and Yunadi Turchaev. The attacks were intended to intimidate civilians and federal forces ahead of the presidential elections in Chechnya, as well as to destabilize the situation in the region.

== Background ==
The assassination of the Chechnyan president Akhmad Kadyrov on May 9, 2004, is seen as the beginning of the offensive and was followed by a major attack carried out a month after rebels captured arms depot in the capital of the Ingushetia region, leaving with 200,000 weapons and a trove of ammunition.

Ilya Shabalkin, head of the Regional Operational Headquarters for Counter-Terrorism Operations in the North Caucasus, emphasised that the military became aware of the militants' planned operation as early as August. Pre-emptive strikes were carried out against concentrations of terrorists. However, these actions produced little effect.

== The raid ==
Around 5:00pm, residence heard mortar fire in Grozny, the intensified later on. Shortly beforehand, a powerful explosion occurred near a monument symbolising friendship between Chechen, Ingush and Russian peoples, shattering nearby windows and leaving a crater. Police believe it had been caused by a grenade launcher attack.

By around 6:00pm, shooting had begun across the city. At 6:10pm, a staff ember of the memorial human rights centre witnessed an artilley shell explode next to the Grozneftyanaya bus stop. Soon afterwards minibus drivers reported that fighting between militants and federal forces was spreading throughout Grozny.

At about 7:00pm estimates say that about 300 fighters entered Grozny. Dividing into small groups of five to seven fighters, they launched coordinated raids in the Oktyabrsky and Staropromyslovsky districts. Witnesses described militants some masked some not, shouting slogans such as “Allahu Akbar!” and “Ichkeria!” whilst forcing residence indoors establishing their own roadblocks and checkpoints to inspect vehicles and attack polling stations located in schools. in the Staropromyslovsky district militants advanced several kilometers in to the city. One federal checkpoint failed to engage them, while another manned by Chechen police opened fire. Witnesses say the attackers were heavily armed with automatic weapon and grenade launchers, spoke both Chechen and Russian.

Militants attacked schools No. 10 and No. 17m both serving as polling centres. At school No. 10 one police officer and one civilian were killed during the firefight. At school No. 17 another police officer was killed. When residence informed the militants that women and children were inside the building, the attackers checked the claim then abandoned the plan to storm the building. The militants also attacked the Grozneftegaz Community centre, releasing the guards before setting the building on fire.

Near the Neftemaisk bus stop, militants stop a car with two young men and shot them dead after becoming suspicious of the man's camouflage trousers. Elsewhere two women were injured by shrapnel, while a minibus driver was seriously injured when his vehicle was hit by a grenade launcher after being stopped and released by militants. A local resident, Ali Isupov, who had brought water to the militants, was later taken away by masked security officers and disappeared.

In the Oktyabrsky district, fighting centred on Minutka Square ad nearby streets. Militants attacked federal checkpoint 29 and set up their own checkpoints, inspecting vehicles and attacking police stations, patrols, polling stations and military targets. They also disabled an armoured personnel carrier and shelled a temporary Ministry of Internal Affairs detachment. Federal forces, police, militia and the Grozny garrison eventually coordinated a response. reports say they neutralized a fifth of the militant forces. By 8:00pm, wounded civilians and fighters were arriving at city hospital No. 9, while volunteers assisted casualties before ambulances could safely enter the area. Between 10:00-11:00pm militants began withdrawing form the city. stealing civilian minibuses, changing to into civilian clothing and escaping in the stolen vehicles.

The Grozny raid was also part of the series of attacks that also included targets in Russia. After the major offensive at Grozny, Chechen women suicide bombers successfully blew two passenger airliners, killing 90 passengers.

== Aftermath ==
On the night of August 24, 2004, federal forces located two militant groups near Grozny, believed to be remnants of those who had attacked the city three days earlier. Airstrikes and artillery targeted their positions around Prigorodnoye, Chechen-Aul, and Pervomayskoye throughout the day. Twelve militants were killed and three detained. In early October three more participants were killed in an operation in Valerik. In October 29, Ruslan Tasuev, deputy of the self styled Emir of Grozny and leader of the August 21 attack was killed in Grozny. One of the attack organizers, Yunadi Turchaev was killed on February 18, 2005.

In 2007, Chechnya's Supreme Court sentenced two raid participants, Ramzan Muradov and Muslim Elmurzaev, to ten years in a high security penal colony. The self proclaimed "Emir" of Grozny, Salambek Akhmedov, was killed in a special operation in Makhachkala on March 22, 2010.

== See also ==
- 2004 Nazran raid
- 2004 Avtury raid
