= Ichkeria =

Ichkeria can refer to:

- The historical name for a region encompassing the highlands of eastern Chechnya, see History of Chechnya#Ichkeria
- Chechen Republic of Ichkeria, the secessionist government of Chechnya

== See also ==
- Chechen (disambiguation)
