= Tuapse oil terminal =

Oil import-export terminal located in Russia

Tuapse Oil Terminal
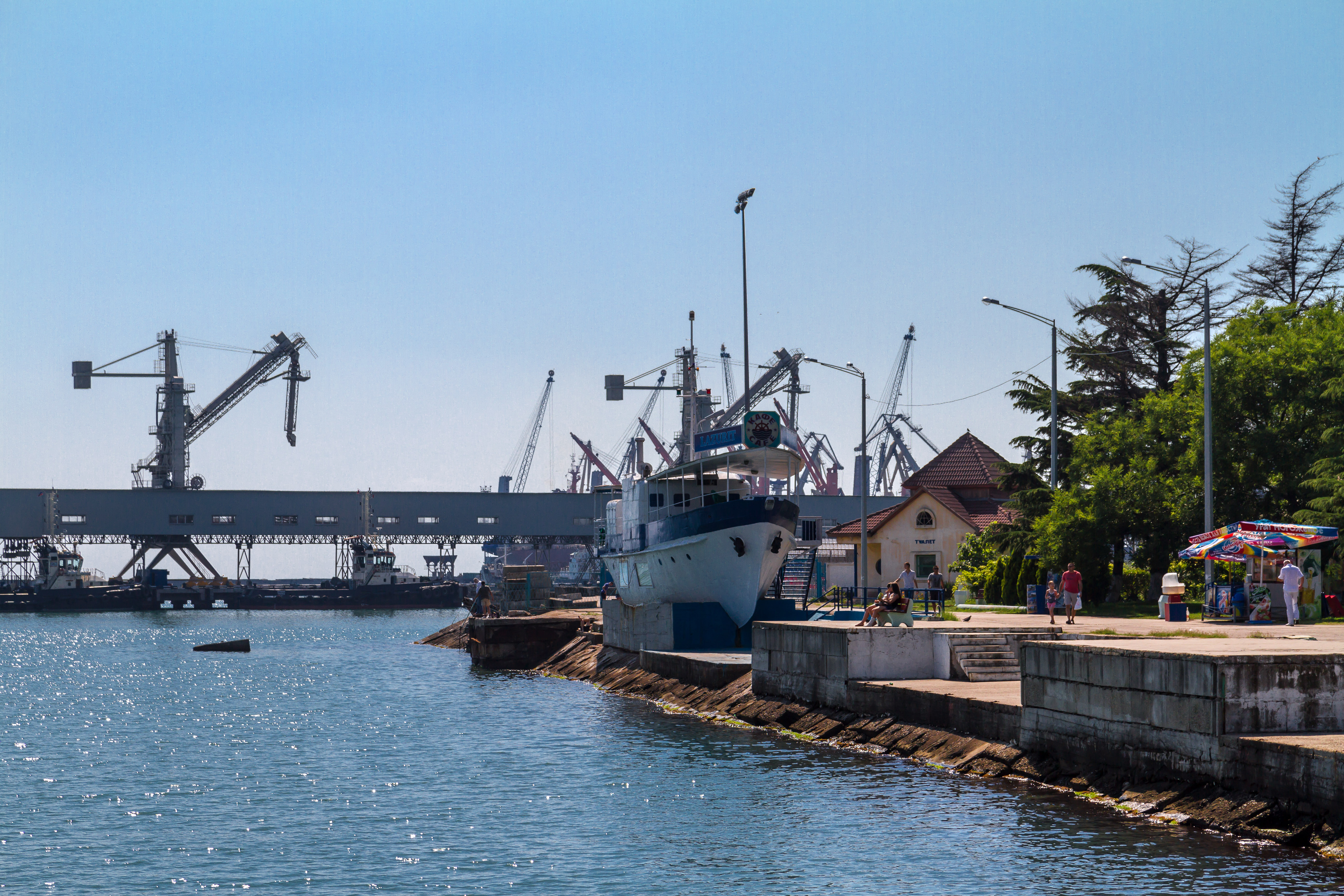
- Interactive map of Tuapse Oil Terminal

Location
- Country: Russia
- Location: Krasnodar Krai
- Coordinates: 44°05′23″N 39°04′54″E

Details
- Opened: 2005
- Operated by: Rosneft
- Owned by: Rosneft
- Type of harbour: Oil Terminal

Statistics
- Annual cargo tonnage: 71 Mbbl (~9.7×10^{6} t)

Tuapse Oil Terminal is an oil import-export terminal located 8 km (5.0 mi) offshore from the port of Tuapse in Krasnodar Krai, Russia. It is one of the biggest oil terminals on the Black Sea and serves as a hub for crude oil deliveries to places beyond. The terminal, which commenced operations in 2005, belongs to the Russian oil giant Rosneft.

== Overview ==
The overall capacity of the import-export terminal is approximately 71 million barrels per annum (~9.7×10^{6} t/a) of oil but capacity will be increased to 121 million barrels per annum (~1.65×10^{7} t/a) by 2015. Tanker loading capacity is suitable for Aframax tankers up to 110,000 DWT. The terminal serves the nearby Tuapse Refinery, also owned by Rosneft.

== History ==
The construction of the terminal started in 2003 and was completed by 2005 at a cost of US$120 million.

2013 saw commissioning of a deep-water terminal capable of receiving 250 m-long-vessels with a 15 m draft and able to process 7 million tons of oil products annually.

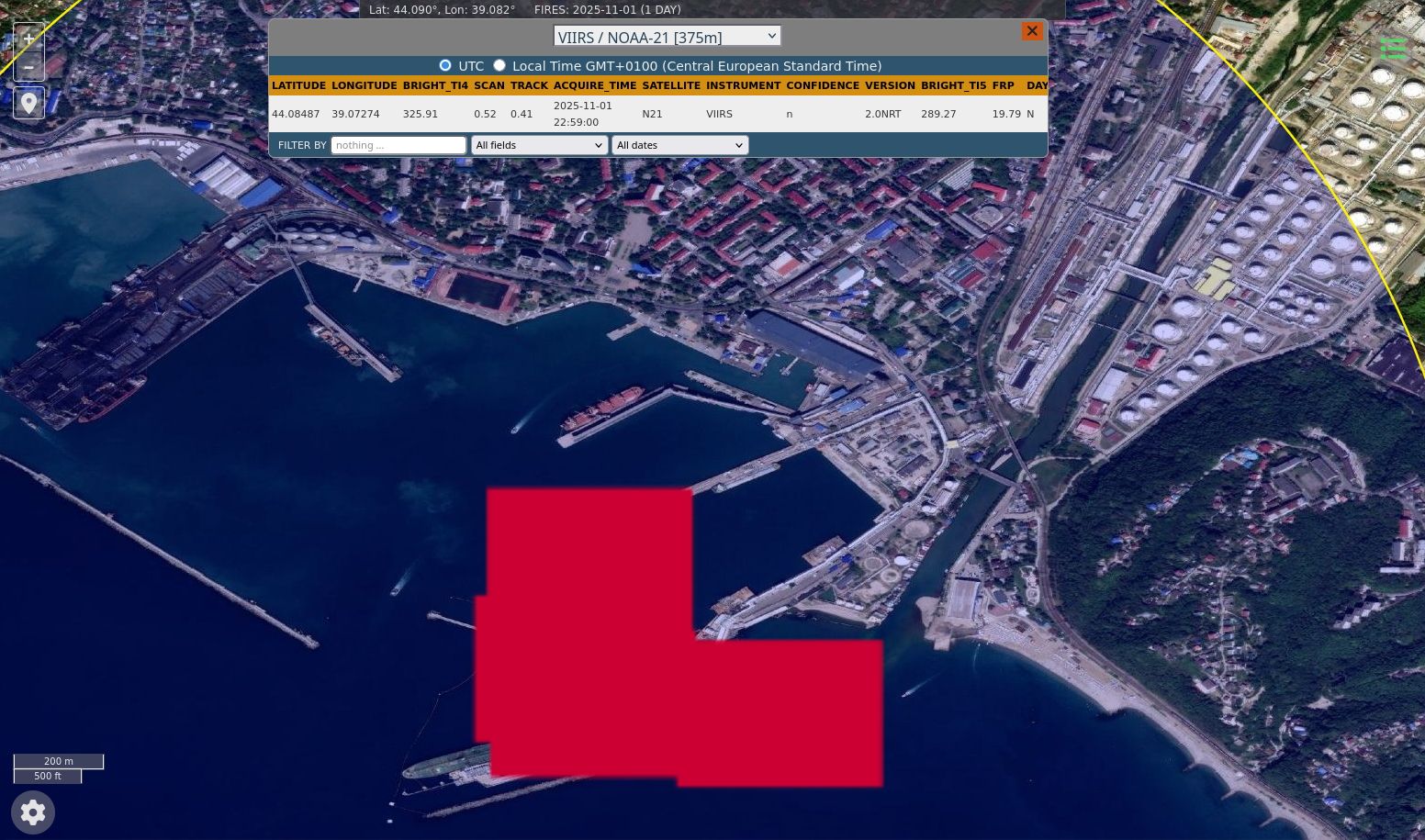
The Tuapse oil terminal fire was detected by NASA's FIRMS on November 1, 2025, at 22:59 (UTC)

As part of the Russo-Ukrainian War the Tuapse oil terminal was attacked by drones on 2 November 2025. The oil-loading infrastructure and an oil tanker caught fire and the tanker's crew was evacuated.

=== 2026 Tuapse oil terminal disaster ===
In April 2026, the Tuapse oil terminal experienced a major industrial accident due to the UAV/drone strikes during the Russo-Ukrainian War. It involved a large fire at the facility, causing significant damage to storage and loading infrastructure and temporarily halted operations. Emergency crews worked to extinguish the fire and prevent further environmental impact in the Black Sea region. The event highlighted ongoing safety and security risks at key Russian energy export terminals.

== See also ==
- Rosneft
