= Supian Ependiyev =

Chechen news correspondent

Supian Ependiyev was a veteran correspondent for the independent Chechen weekly Groznensky Rabochy, who was killed while covering a Russian Ground Forces ballistic missile attack on the Chechen capital, Grozny.

On the evening of October 27, 1999, several short-range ballistic missiles hit a crowded outdoor market in central Grozny, killing or wounding hundreds of people, mostly civilians. About an hour after the attack, Ependiyev went to the scene to cover the carnage for his paper. Nevertheless, as he was leaving the site, a new round of Scud missiles fell about 200 meters from the bazaar. Ependiyev suffered severe shrapnel wounds and died in a Grozny hospital the next morning. (According to other sources, he died two days later.)

Ependiyev was the first journalist to be killed while covering the Second Chechen War. During the First Chechen War twenty journalists were killed. The Committee to Protect Journalists protested the death of Supian Ependiyev in an open letter to President of Russia Boris Yeltsin.
