= Tuapse =

Town in Krasnodar Krai, Russia

Tuapse Туапсе Тӏуапсэ (Adyghe)
- Town
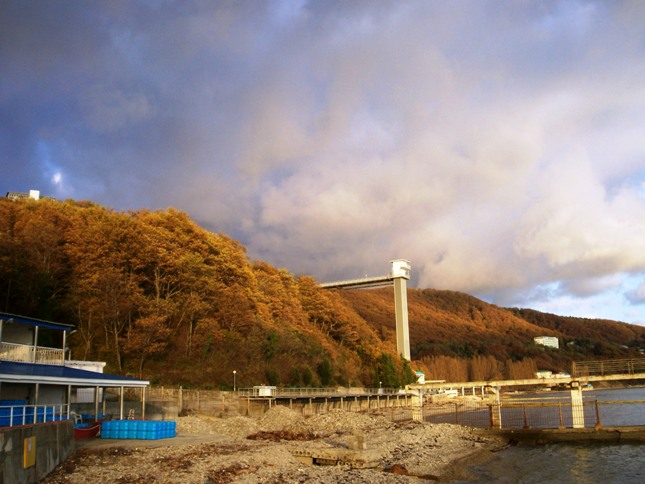
- Black Sea coast near Tuapse in November

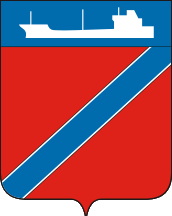
- Flag Coat of arms
- Interactive map of Tuapse
- Location of Tuapse Tuapse (European Russia) Tuapse (Black Sea)
- Coordinates: 44°06′16″N 39°04′38″E
- Country: Russia
- Federal subject: Krasnodar Krai
- Founded: 1838
- Town status since: 1916

Government
  - Body: Council
  - Head: Alexander Chekhov
- Elevation: 45 m (148 ft)

Population (2010 Census)
  - Total: 63,292
  - Estimate (2025): 60,089 (−5.1%)
  - Rank: 250th in 2010

Administrative status
  - Subordinated to: Town of Tuapse
  - Capital of: Town of Tuapse, Tuapsinsky District

Municipal status
  - Municipal district: Tuapsinsky Municipal District
  - Urban settlement: Tuapsinskoye Urban Settlement
  - Capital of: Tuapsinsky Municipal District, Tuapsinskoye Urban Settlement
- Time zone: UTC+3 (MSK)
- Postal codes: 352800–352803, 352808, 352859
- Dialing code: +7 86167
- OKTMO ID: 03655101001
- Town Day: First Sunday of July
- Website: adm.tuapse.ru

Tuapse (Note: Russian: Туапсе́; Adyghe: Тӏуапсэ, romanized: Ṫuapsă, IPA: [tʷʼapsə].) is a town in Krasnodar Krai, Russia, situated on the northeast shore of the Black Sea, south of Gelendzhik and north of Sochi. Population: 61,571 (2021 census); 63,292 (2010 census); 64,238 (2002 census); 63,081 (1989 Soviet census).

Tuapse is a sea port and the northern center of a resort zone that extends south to Sochi.

== History ==
=== Early history ===
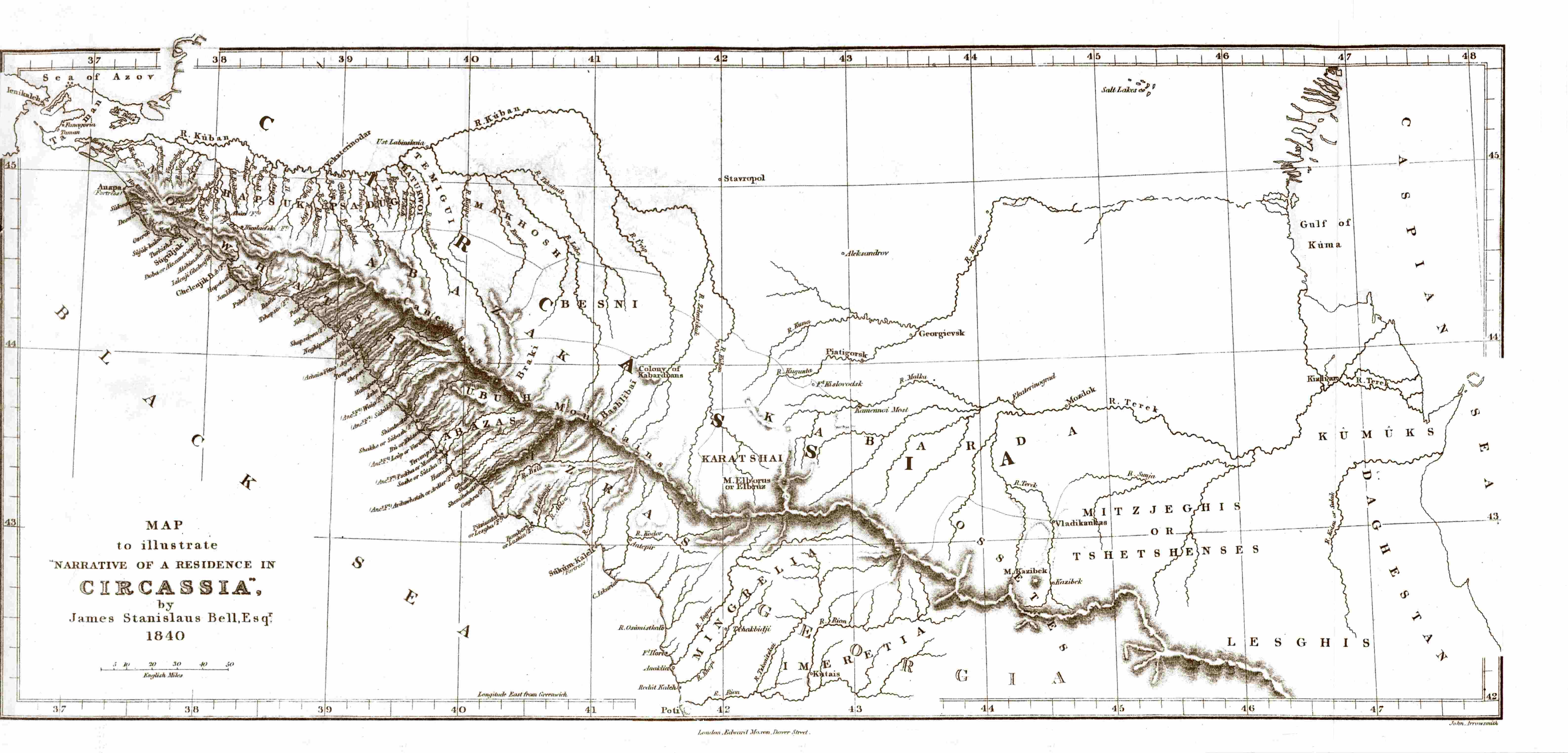
Map of Circassia in 1840

Tuapse was a large center (native land) for the Shapsugs tribe, along other areas in Circassia. The name of the town is itself Adyghe (literally meaning "two waters").

The modern settlement dates back to 1838, when the Russian fort of Velyaminovsky was established in the area after this region became a part of Russia in 1829 by the Treaty of Adrianople. During the Crimean War, the Ottomans seized the fort and held it for two years (1857–1859). The village of Velyaminovskoye (Вельяминовское) was established here in 1864; it is the village that later became Tuapse. Town status was granted to Tuapse in 1896. During the Russian Empire, the town was the administrative capital of the Tuapsinsky Okrug.

=== 20th century ===
From 1924 to 1930, Tuapse was the capital of the Shapsug national district. According to the 1926 census, the population was 54.6% Russian, 17.0% Ukrainian, 3.8% Armenian, 2.8% Greek, 1.6% Polish, 1.3% Georgian and 1.1% Jewish.

The Soviets developed Tuapse as an oil terminal and depot. An oil pipeline from Grozny and Maykop was in operation by 1928, designed by Vladimir Shukhov. An oil refinery dates from the same period. No later than 1941, Tuapse's status was changed to that of a town of the krai subordination.

During World War II, the German military attempted to seize the town during the Battle of the Caucasus, which caused major damage to Tuapse. The Germans reached the hills above from the north, but were not able to seize the town and its port.

=== 21st century ===
During the Russo-Ukrainian war, the Ukrainian military first attacked the port of Tuapse in February 2023. In April 2026, Ukrainian drone attacks targeted oil facilities at Tuapse, resulting in an industrial and environmental disaster in the region.

== Administrative and municipal status ==
Within the framework of administrative divisions, Tuapse serves as the administrative center of Tuapsinsky District, even though it is not a part of it. As an administrative division, it is incorporated separately as the Town of Tuapse—an administrative unit with the status equal to that of a district. As a municipal division, the Town of Tuapse is incorporated within Tuapsinsky Municipal District as Tuapsinskoye Urban Settlement.

== Geography ==
The town is situated on the northeast shore of the Black Sea, south of Gelendzhik and north of Sochi. The Russian Children Center Orlyonok (former All-Russian SFSR Young Pioneer camp) is here.

=== Climate ===
Tuapse has a humid subtropical climate (Köppen climate classification Cfa). Tuapse has warm to hot summers and cool winters with frequent rainfall year-round.

Climate data for Tuapse (1955–2011)
Month	Jan	Feb	Mar	Apr	May	Jun	Jul	Aug	Sep	Oct	Nov	Dec	Year
Record high °C (°F)	22.2 (72.0)	24.0 (75.2)	26.5 (79.7)	30.0 (86.0)	35.4 (95.7)	35.1 (95.2)	41.1 (106.0)	40.0 (104.0)	38.8 (101.8)	31.2 (88.2)	26.1 (79.0)	23.7 (74.7)	41.1 (106.0)
Mean daily maximum °C (°F)	8.2 (46.8)	8.8 (47.8)	11.4 (52.5)	15.9 (60.6)	20.5 (68.9)	24.6 (76.3)	27.8 (82.0)	28.5 (83.3)	24.7 (76.5)	19.7 (67.5)	14.4 (57.9)	10.3 (50.5)	18.0 (64.4)
Daily mean °C (°F)	5.0 (41.0)	5.4 (41.7)	7.7 (45.9)	12.0 (53.6)	16.4 (61.5)	20.4 (68.7)	23.5 (74.3)	23.8 (74.8)	19.7 (67.5)	14.8 (58.6)	10.5 (50.9)	7.1 (44.8)	14.0 (57.2)
Mean daily minimum °C (°F)	2.1 (35.8)	2.4 (36.3)	4.5 (40.1)	8.5 (47.3)	12.6 (54.7)	16.4 (61.5)	19.3 (66.7)	19.4 (66.9)	15.5 (59.9)	10.8 (51.4)	7.1 (44.8)	4.1 (39.4)	10.3 (50.5)
Record low °C (°F)	−19.0 (−2.2)	−15.0 (5.0)	−8.0 (17.6)	−4.2 (24.4)	2.3 (36.1)	4.8 (40.6)	5.0 (41.0)	9.0 (48.2)	3.0 (37.4)	−3.9 (25.0)	−9.1 (15.6)	−10.5 (13.1)	−19.0 (−2.2)
Average precipitation mm (inches)	143.2 (5.64)	106.6 (4.20)	93.8 (3.69)	94.3 (3.71)	95.0 (3.74)	80.5 (3.17)	77.3 (3.04)	89.2 (3.51)	114.6 (4.51)	106.9 (4.21)	155.4 (6.12)	176.2 (6.94)	1,333 (52.48)
Average precipitation days	17.5	14.7	18.3	13.6	12.2	7.4	5.0	4.2	7.8	12.7	12.4	15.3	141.1
Average relative humidity (%)	71.3	69.4	70.9	71.1	74.7	75.2	72.5	68.4	69.4	72.2	69.3	69.2	71.1
Mean monthly sunshine hours	94.6	109.2	139.5	181.5	254.2	300.0	333.3	313.1	250.5	204.6	123.0	96.1	2,399.5
Source: climatebase.ru

Average sea temperature (1977–2006)
Month	Jan	Feb	Mar	Apr	May	Jun	Jul	Aug	Sep	Oct	Nov	Dec
Average temperature	8.9 °C	8.0 °C	8.7 °C	11.0 °C	15.2 °C	19.5 °C	23.7 °C	25.0 °C	22.4 °C	18.8 °C	14.2 °C	10.7. °C

== Economy and transport ==
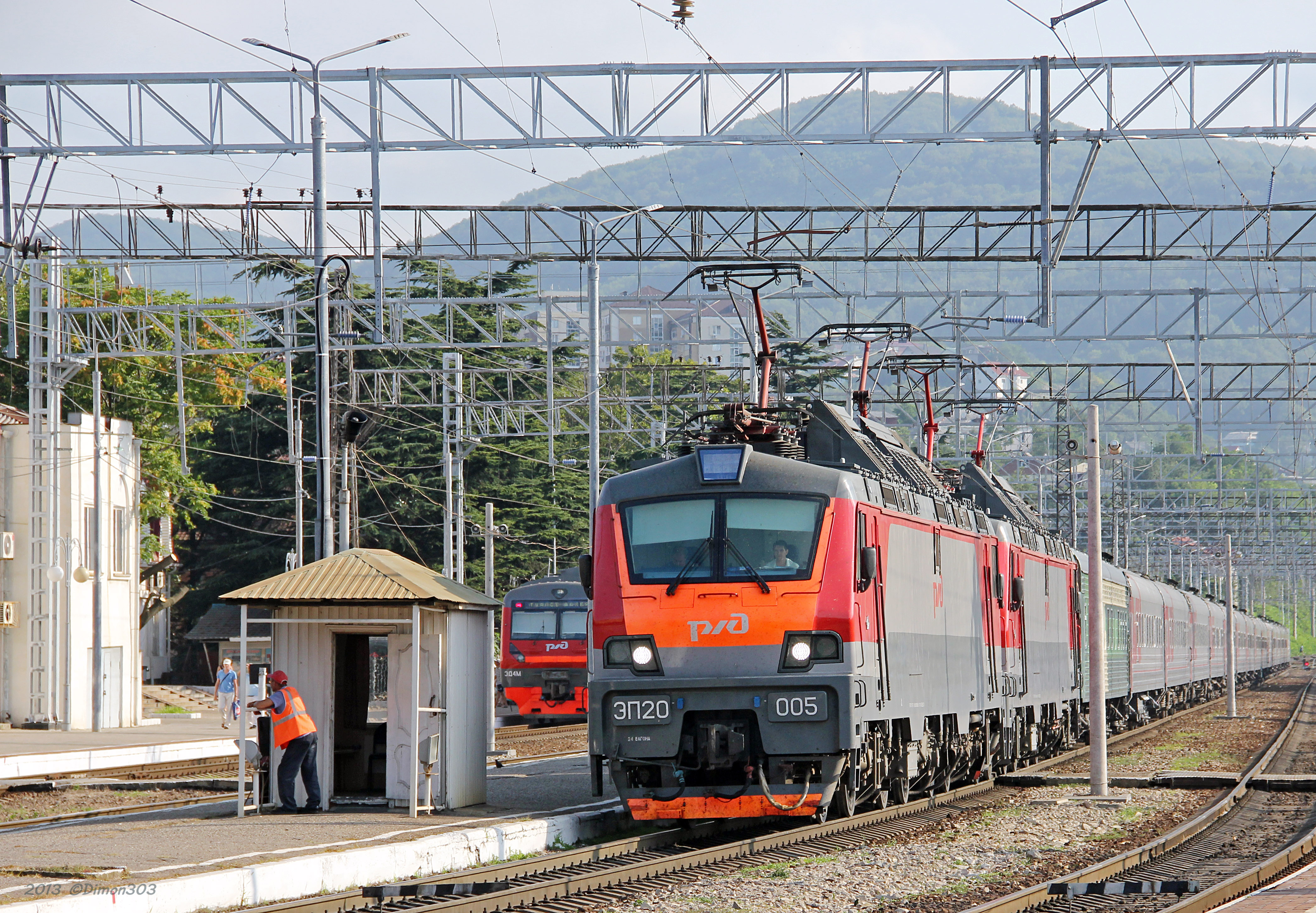
Express train Moscow–Adler leaving platform 1 of Tuapse station

Tuapse is home to the Tuapse oil terminal and the Tuapse Refinery.

Tuapse is one of the key transport hubs of the Black Sea coast of Russia. The city's location determines its key importance to ensure a ground connection with the spa capital of the country – the city of Sochi – and makes it important for the export commodities of the country (oil, fertilizer, coal, etc.).

There is a railway station in Tuapse.

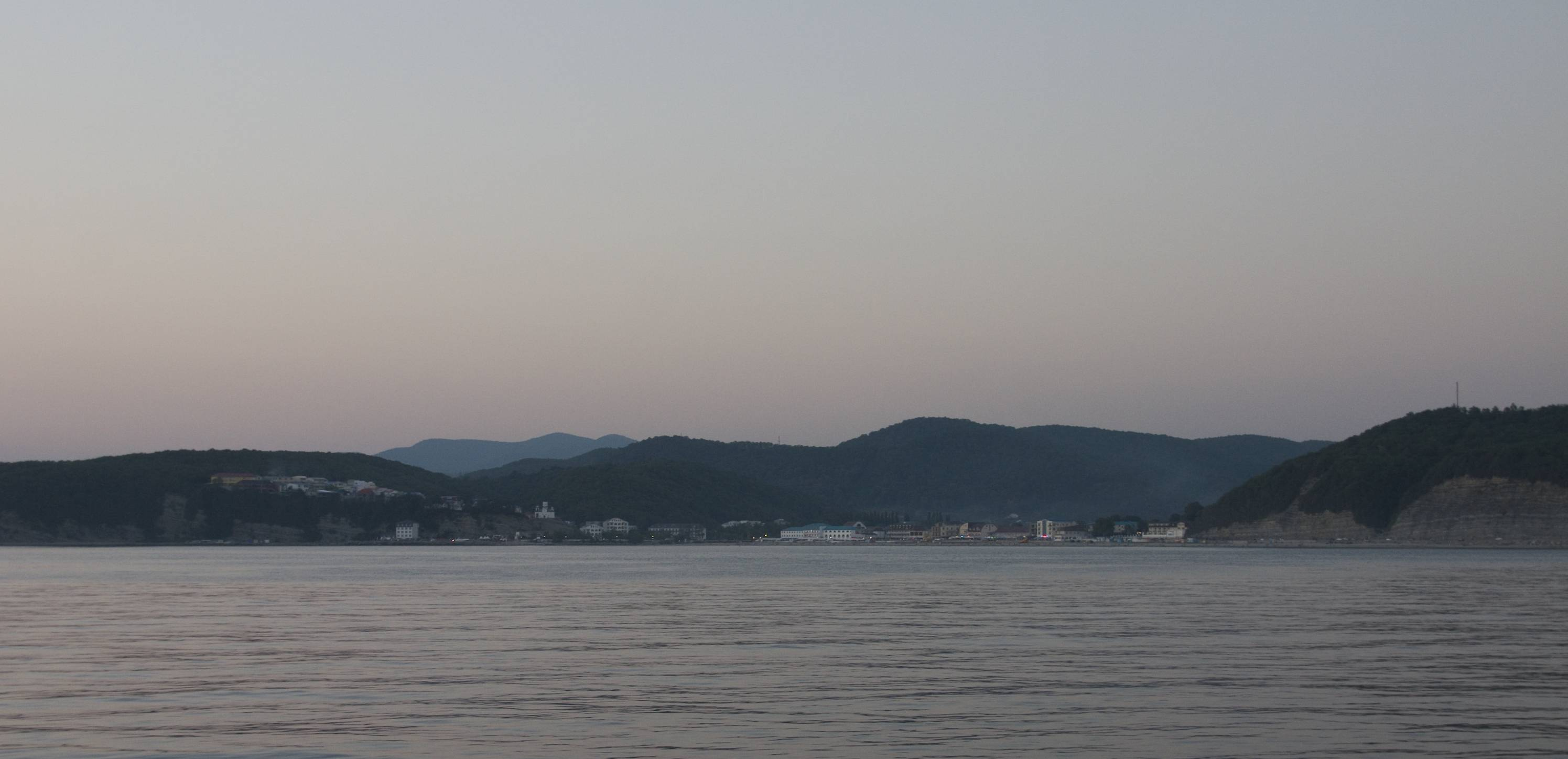
The sea coast between Dzhubga and Tuapse

== Twin towns and sister cities ==
Tuapse is twinned with:

- Agen, France

== Notable people ==
- Natalie Glebova, 2005 Miss Universe winner, born here
- Vladimir Kramnik, Russian chess grandmaster and former World Champion, born here
- Eduard Lusikyan, Russian former professional football player of Armenian descent
- Alexey Arkhipovsky, Russian balalaika player
