= Lechi Dudayev =

Chechen politician and officer (1961–2000)

Mayor of Grozny
- In office 1996–2000

Personal details
- Born: 1961 Grozny, Checheno-Ingush ASSR, Soviet Union
- Died: 31 January 2000 (aged 38–39) Grozny, Chechen Republic of Ichkeria
- Awards: Ġazotan tur

Military service
- Allegiance: Chechen Republic of Ichkeria
- Years of service: 1994–2000
- Rank: Colonel
- Commands: Duki special forces
- Battles/wars: First Chechen War; Second Chechen War

Lechi Sultanovich Dudayev (Russian: Леча Султанович Дудаев; 1961 — 31 January 2000) was a Chechen politician who was mayor of Grozny and a participant in both Russian-Chechen wars from 1994 until 2000.

== Biography ==
Dudayev was born in 1961 in Grozny. He was the son of Bekmurza Dudayev, which made his uncle the first President of Ichkeria, Dzhokhar Dudayev. He was part of the Yalkharoy teip, who mainly came from the city of Yalkharoy. After graduating from high school in 1982, he worked in the engineering department of GrozNII of Oil and Gas, and while on the job graduated from the Grozny State Oil Technical University with a degree in mechanical engineering.

== Death ==
When, during the breakthrough from the blockade of Grozny, the Chechen command learnt that the exit was booby-trapped, someone suggested letting in Russian prisoners of war. A militant, Arsan Abubakarov, recalled in his diary that they were trying to go to Yermolovka at the time, and were forced into the minefield when they were ambushed on a bridge with machine guns. Unhappy with these words, Lechi Dudayev said that the Chechens could not use methods peculiar to the Russians. He suggested that the commanders move forward. All his comrades-in-arms agreed to this proposal.

Dudayev wanted to go first through the mined field, but he was stopped by Shamil Basayev, who himself stepped forward to clear the way for the Chechen soldiers following him. However, there was an explosion and Basayev's right foot was blown off. Dudayev came forward next, and after walking a few steps he too was blown up by a Russian mine. His wound was fatal.
