= 1999 Grozny refugee convoy shooting =

1999 mass shooting in Grozny, Russia

Grozny refugee convoy shooting
- Part of the Battle of Grozny
- Location: 43.316667°N 45.683333°E; Near Grozny, Chechnya
- Date: 3 December 1999
- Attack type: Mass shooting
- Deaths: At least 40
- Injuries: 7
- Perpetrator: OMON

The Grozny refugee convoy shooting occurred on 3 December 1999, when at least 40 people fleeing the besieged Chechen capital Grozny were reportedly killed by Russian special police units, OMON.

== Incident ==
According to accounts from survivors, a refugee convoy consisting of about 50 people in seven or eight passenger cars and one bus marked with white flags, was heading towards the border with the Russian republic of Ingushetia, when they approached a federal roadblock near the village of Goyty. One survivor described masked OMON troops opening fire with automatic rifles from their position in the nearby forest without warning. The bus exploded as bullets pierced its fuel tank. After the shooting, Russian soldiers gave first aid and painkillers to the handful of survivors and brought them to the hospital in Ordzhonikidzevskaya, Ingushetia, where journalists interviewed them.

The incident happened just a few miles from a major battle at the crossroads of Urus-Martan, which sits astride a road that Chechen militants were using as a supply line. Another battle was under way not far from there, in the village of Alkhan-Kala. The Russian Ministry of Defence stated that the media reports of this incident were disinformation. Officials were quoted as saying that 30 vehicles were destroyed on roads leading out of Grozny, but that all the cars contained rebels, not civilians. They also said they had opened a safe passage out of Grozny for the thousands of civilians.

A similar incident involving refugees fleeing Grozny was reported in August 1996 during the First Chechen War.

== See also ==
- Baku–Rostov highway bombing
