= 1999 Russian bombing of Chechnya =

Airstrike before the Second Chechen War

The 1999 Russian bombing of Chechnya was Russian Air Force's military operation against the Chechen Republic of Ichkeria that was a prelude to the main part of the Second Chechen War. In late August and September 1999, Russia mounted a massive air campaign over Chechnya, with the stated aim of wiping out militants who invaded Dagestan the previous month.

Russian Air Force commander Anatoly Kornukov suggested there were similarities between the attacks on Chechnya and the NATO bombing of Yugoslavia.

== Campaign ==
On August 26, 1999, Russia acknowledged bombing raids in Chechnya. Russian aircraft attacked several targets in Serzhen-Yurt, Benoy and along the Vedeno gorge.

To help rally political support for the operation, the FSB released a videotape of Chechen militants committing atrocities against Russian soldiers. "We should hit, hit and once again hit them until Mr. Maskhadov says that there's nobody left except civilians. Then we should get in and see that for ourselves," said a member of the Duma's defense committee.

On September 23, 1999, the first in a series of missile attacks on the Chechen capital Grozny was launched. The first target was the Sheikh Mansur (Severny) Grozny Airport, situated 2 kilometres from the city centre. In the north-east, burning fuel depots and the Grozny oil refinery and enveloping the capital in a cloud of smoke. During the next two days of Russian air attacks on the city at least 31 people were killed and more than 60 injured.

On September 27, 1999, at least 42 people were killed and more than 200 injured in the bombing raids on Grozny.

== Effects ==
Until September 25, 1999, Russian warplanes had carried out at least 1,700 sorties since the bombing runs began. Russian command claimed that a total of 150 military bases have been destroyed, along with 30 bridges, 80 vehicles and six radio transmitters, while 250 kilometers of mountain roads were mined. In early October the Chechen President Aslan Maskhadov said some 60-70 percent of the bridges in Chechnya have been destroyed.

The air strikes quickly crippled Chechnya's stationary and mobile telephone system and hit the Chechen television station. The electricity supply was also cut; in addition to its other consequences, the loss of electricity further crippled the Chechen administration's ability to compete in the information war.

The attacks were reported to have killed hundreds of civilians and forced at least 100,000 Chechens to flee their homes. The neighbouring region of Ingushetia was reported to have appealed for United Nations aid to deal with tens of thousands of refugees. On October 2, 1999 Russia's Ministry of Emergency Situations admitted that 78,000 people have fled the air strikes in Chechnya; most of them were heading for Ingushetia, where they are arriving at a rate of 5,000 to 6,000 a day.

== See also ==
- List of Russian aircraft losses in the Second Chechen War
