= Assault on the presidential palace in Grozny =

Battle of the First Chechen War

- Part of the First Chechen War and the Battle of Grozny
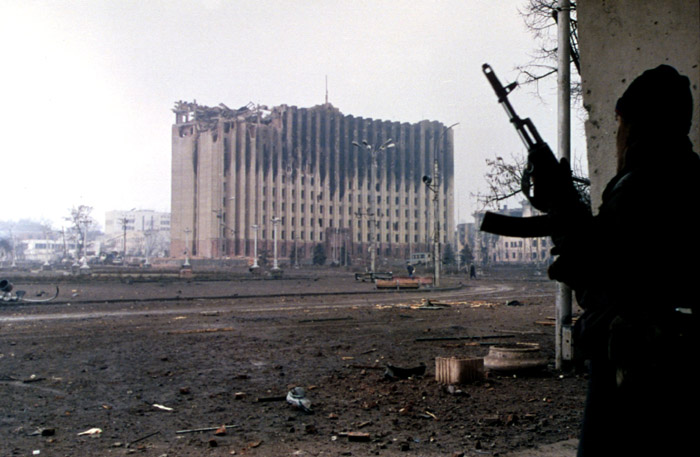
- A Chechen fighter stands silhouetted before the Presidential Palace in January 1995
| Date | 31 December 1994 – 19 January 1995 |
| Location | Chechnya, Grozny |
| Result | Capture of the Presidential Palace by the Russian Troops |

Belligerents
| (Chechen Republic of Ichkeria) Chechnya | Russia |

Commanders and leaders
| (Chechen Republic of Ichkeria) Aslan Maskhadov | (Russia) Lev Rokhlin |

Units involved
| (Chechen Republic of Ichkeria) Chechen Fighters | (Russia) Armed Forces |

Strength
| (Chechen Republic of Ichkeria) 350 fighters (Chechen Republic of Ichkeria) 150 militants | (Russia) Unknown |

Casualties and losses
| (Chechen Republic of Ichkeria) 50–60 killed (Chechen Republic of Ichkeria) Unknown number captured | (Russia) 150 to 200 killed |

The assault on the presidential palace in Grozny was a combat episode of the First Chechen War (1994–1996), which occurred during the assault on Grozny by Russian federal troops. It took place from 31 December 1994 until 19 January 1995. The battle ended when the building was finally captured by Russian forces.

== Background ==
After the unrecognized Chechen Republic of Ichkeria declared independence, the former building of the Republican Committee of the Communist Party of the Soviet Union, Checheno-Ingush ASSR in the city of Grozny was repurposed as the residence of the leader of the Chechen separatists, President Dzhokhar Dudayev, during which it became known as the “presidential palace”. During this period, the building was also used for the work of the government of Ichkeria.

On 26 December 1994, at a meeting of the Security Council of the Russian Federation, a decision was made to storm Grozny. The plan to capture the city on the night of January 1 provided for the actions of groups of federal troops from four directions: “North” (under the command of Major General K. Pulikovsky ); “West” (under the command of Major General V. Petruk); "North-East" (under the command of Lieutenant General L. Rokhlin ) and "Vostok" (under the command of Major General N. Staskov). The emphasis was on surprise and complete superiority in the quality of weapons. The groups were given a goal: to take administrative buildings, including the presidential palace and government building, radio, and railway station.

From the northern direction, two assault detachments of the “North” group of troops and an assault detachment of the “North-East” group had the task, advancing in the zone allotted to them, to block the northern part of the city and the presidential palace from the north. From the western direction, two assault detachments of the “West” group of troops, advancing in a designated zone, were supposed to capture the railway station, and subsequently, moving in a northerly direction, block the presidential palace from the south.

For the defense of Grozny, the Chechen command created three defensive lines. The internal border, with a radius of 1 to 1.5 km, was located around the presidential palace. On the internal line, the defense of the Chechen formations was based on the creation of continuous resistance centers around the presidential palace using capital stone buildings. The lower and upper floors of the buildings were adapted for firing from small arms and anti-tank weapons. Along Ordzhonikidze, Pobeda and Pervomaiskaya streets, prepared positions were created for direct fire from artillery and tanks.

== Battle ==
=== New Year's assault ===
Federal troops "West" entered Grozny at 7:30 a.m. on 31 December 1994, but during the operation the task of capturing the station was canceled and the forces were sent to the presidential palace. The main task of capturing the Presidential Palace of Dudayev (formerly the Republican Committee of the Checheno-Ingush Autonomous Soviet Socialist Republic) went to the “North” group. The overall command of the North group was exercised by Major General Konstantin Pulikovsky (131st Motorized Rifle Brigade, 81st Motorized Rifle Regiment, 276th Motorized Rifle Regiment). Almost without a fight, the 1st Battalion of the 81st Motorized Rifle Regiment reached the railway station (by 13.00) and Dudayev's presidential palace (by 15.00).

Until 12 noon, the Dudayevites did not offer resistance, as subsequent events showed - not by chance. Later it became known that Aslan Maskhadov, who was appointed in March 1994 as the Chief of the Main Staff of the Armed Forces of the Chechen Republic of Ichkeria, and who led the defense of the presidential palace in Grozny in December 1994 - January 1995, developed a plan according to which the Chechens deliberately let tanks into the city center, after which with the onset of darkness they struck.

From buildings along the streets, infantry and armored vehicles were shot at point-blank range. Classic counteraction was organized to the movement of armored columns along the narrow streets of Grozny: usually the leading and trailing vehicles in the column were first destroyed, after which multi-tiered (floor-by-floor) fire was opened from the surrounding buildings on the rest of the armored vehicles.

The battalions of the 81st Motorized Rifle Regiment and the 131st (Maikop) Motorized Rifle Brigade, standing in columns along the streets near the railway station and Dudayev's presidential palace, did not take care of organizing the defense and dispersing the units. Without covering the equipment, without setting up checkpoints along the route of movement and without conducting reconnaissance, they allowed the Chechens to secretly concentrate a strike force there, numbering up to 3.5 thousand militants, 50 guns and tanks, 300 grenade launchers, and suddenly attack with the onset of darkness.

The battle began at about 19:00 and lasted all night on January 1. The soldiers and officers retreated to the station, where they tried to gain a foothold, but the building, which had huge windows and many entrances, was unsuitable for defense. Therefore, at night, at about 24 hours, the remnants of the Maykop brigade, with the support of two tanks, tried to break out of the city along the railway. Since 1 a.m. on January 1, contact with them has been lost. As it turned out later, the group was surrounded on one of the station streets and was completely killed during the battle.

Along with her, the commander of the 131st brigade, Colonel Savin, and almost the entire command of the brigade died in battle. In total, during the “New Year’s assault,” the Maikop brigade from the “North” group lost 189 people killed, captured and missing, 20 T-72 tanks out of 26, 102 infantry fighting vehicles out of 120, all 6 Tunguska air defense missile systems of the anti-aircraft division. In sixty hours, Russian casualties are estimated to be at least 1,500, possibly as high as 2,000, including the ill–fated Maikop Brigade.

=== January attacks ===
On 7 January (Orthodox Christmas), Russian forces launched another attack on the presidential palace. It was defended by 350 Chechen full-time fighters and an estimated 150 part-time militiamen. The Chechens had set up barricades, set booby traps, and had fighters blend in with the civilian population.

The Russians sent multiple infantry platoons to attack the palace. They were supported by tanks, armored personnel carriers, infantry fighting vehicles, artillery, mortars, and airstrikes. The groups of Russians systematically attacked a building, captured it, and then used it to stage an assault on the next. The Russians not only advanced steadily but destroyed the city, as artillery fire would occur ahead of ground troops. Russian soldiers were unable to make major gains, and declared a ceasefire until 12 January. On 9 January, as part of the attempt to cut off access to the palace, Russian troops seized the Grozny Railway Station.

On 12 January, the Russians opened with a three-hour long artillery and rocket barrage at the center of Gronzy. Russian naval infantry forces were added to the Russian numbers. They fought towards the city center for five days. By 16 January, Russian forces had managed to surround the burning building on three sides, but still failed to dislodge its defenders. The building, over the course of three weeks, had been hit directly with hundreds of pieces of artillery, tank fire, and rockets.

On 17 January, two nine-ton bunker buster bombs were dropped on the building. The first penetrated the building and hit its basement—which housed the battle headquarters of Aslan Maskhadov, the Chechen chief of staff, a field hospital, and an improvised prisoner-of-war camp for captured Russian soldiers—and killed 50–60 injured people as well as several prisoners. The second landed meters away from Maskhadov's command post, though it did not explode, and Maskhadov managed to escape.

The remaining Chechen fighters fled the building under the cover of darkness on the night of 18 January, crossing the river and being captured by Russian forces the next day, 19 January. That day, the palace was finally captured by Russian soldiers, who then raised the Russian flag over the building. Several members of Parliament wanted to give the commander of the unit that captured the building the Hero of the Russian Federation, the highest honorary title in Russia.
