= Vostok Highway =

Vostok Highway may refer to two Russian highways:

- A375 Highway, in Far East region, named Vostok before October 2023
- M12 highway (Russia), from Moscow to Tyumen, named Vostok since 2020
