= Rechnaya Matuga Island =

Rechnaya Matuga
- Island
- Location within Magadan Oblast
- Coordinates: 61.6808°N 160.2283°E
- Country: Russian Federation
- Federal subject: Far Eastern Federal District
- Oblast: Magadan Oblast

Rechnaya Matuga is an island in the Sea of Okhotsk, about 1,600 yards southwestward of Matugin Point. The highest point of the island is flat-topped, 220 feet (67.1 m) in height.

Administratively this island belongs to the Magadan Oblast of the Russian Federation.
