= List of Kazan mayors =

List of Kazan city's mayors:

== Voivodes (Tsardom of Russia) ==
1. Alexander Gorbatyi-Shuisky (1552–1553)
2. Mikhail Glinsky (1553–1555)
3. Pyotr Shuisky (1553–1557)
4. Dmitry Chobotov (1555)
5. Fyodor Romodanovsky (1556–?)
6. Alexander Vorotynsky (1558–1559)
7. Yury Temkin-Rostovsky (1559–1562)
8. Grigory Temkin-Rostovsky (1562)
9. Mikhail Lykov-Obolensky (1562–1565)
10. Pyotr Kurakin (1571–?)
11. Mikhail Vorotynsky
12. Pyotr Kurakin (?–1575; second time)
13. Ivan Yeletsky (1582–?)
14. Ivan Vorotynsky Jr. (1592–1598)
15. Fyodor Khvorostinin (1598–1600)
16. Merkury Shcherbatov (1600)
17. Vasily Ya. Kuzmin (1600–?)
18. Vasily M. Kuzmin-Korovayev (?–1601)
19. Ivan Shpak (1601–?)
20. Vasily M. Kuzmin-Korovayev (1605–1606; second time)
21. Bogdan Belsky (1606–1611)
22. Vasily Morozov (1611)
23. Nikifor Shulgin (1611)
24. Ivan Birkin (1611–1612)
25. Yury Ushaty (1613–1614)
26. Ivan Vorotynsky Jr. (1614–1615; second time)
27. Vladimir Dolgorukov (1615–1617)
28. Ivan Vorotynsky Jr. (1618–1619; third time)
29. Boris Khilkov (1619–1620)
30. Boris Lykov-Obolensky / Ivan Odoyevsky Jr. (1620–1624)
31. Semyon Golovin (1624–1626)
32. Vasily Morozov (1626–1628)
33. Fyodor Buturlin (1632)
34. Vladimir Dolgorukov (1632–1633; second time)
35. Matvey Godunov (1634)
36. Nikita Odoyevsky (1640–1642)
37. Ivan Golitsyn Sr. (1641)
38. Mikhail M. Temkin-Rostovsky (1641–1643)
39. Mikhail Pronsky (1643–1647)
40. Vasily Sheremetev (1649)
41. Gleb Morozov (1650)
42. Dmitry Dolgorukov (1660–?)
43. Yakov Odoyevsky (1670–1673)
44. Yury Romodanovsky (1673–1676)
45. Ivan Miloslavsky (1676–1677)
46. Mikhail Pleshcheyev (1677–1678)
47. Mikhail Cherkassky (1678)
48. Nikita Odoyevsky (1681)
49. Ivan Zhelyabuzhsky (1681)
50. Yakov Odoyevsky (1681–1683; second time)
51. Ivan "Lob" Golitsyn (?–1686)
52. Dmitry Baryatinsky (1689–?)
53. Nikita Kusryavtsev (1699–1705)

== Mayors (Russian Empire) ==
1. I. Dryablov (1767-1769)
2. V. Poyarkov (1769-1773)
3. Pyotr Kamenev (1773-1776)
4. A. Yenikeyev (1776-1981)
5. I. Kobelev (1782-1784)
6. P. Bogdanovsky (1785-1787)
7. Alexey Kvasnikov (1788-1790)
8. Pyotr Komarov (1791-1793)
9. Pyotr Smirnov (1794-1796)
10. Osip Petrov (1797-1799)
11. Leonty Krupenikov (1809–1811)
12. Alexander Krupenikov (1839–1841)
13. Erast Yanishevsky (1871–1881)
14. Sergey Dyachenko (1889–1895)
15. Alexander Lebedev (1899-1903)
16. Rudolf Nikolai (1903-1905)
17. Alexander Popryadukhin (1905-1910)
18. Sergei Beketov (1910-1917)

== Civil War and Soviet era ==
- Yakov Sheinkman (November 1917 – July 1918) (Chairman of City Council)
- Ivan Mezhlauk (April–June 1918) (Secretary to the city's Party Committee)
- Iosif Khodorovsky (1920-1920) (Chairman of Executive Committee)
- Semyon Kanatchikov (1920-1921)
- Alexey Galaktionov (1921-1922)
- Mikhail Yendakov (1922-1923) (Chairman of City Council Panel)
- Konstantin Ratekhin (1923-1924)
- Vasily Lazarev (1924-1926)
- Andrei Tersky (1926-1927)
- Yakov Yefremov (1927-1929)
- Nikolai Romanov (1929-1931)
- Solomon Ioffe (1931-1932)
- Veniamin Shtukater (1932-1934)
- Barey Nurgaleyev (1934-1935)
- Pavel Aksyonov (1935-1937)
- Vasily Fomichev (1937)
- Mikhail Kuz'min (1937-1938)
- Saligjan Anitullin (1938-1939)
- Gavriil Murin (1939-1943) (Chairman of Executive Committee)
- Zakir Tinchurin (1943)
- Dmitry Tyshkevich (1943-1944)
- Alexey Yakushev (1944-1946)
- Grigory Tikhonov (1946-1947)
- Vladimir Golovin (1947-1952)
- Badrutdin Mulyukov (1953-1955)
- Vsevolod Slastnikov (1955)
- Pavel Tunakov (1957-1965)
- Alexander Bondarenko (1965-1985)
- Revo Idiatullin (1985-1989)
- Kamil Iskhakov (1989-1991)

== Russian Federation ==
- Rafik Gumerov (1991–1993; Chairman of City Council)
- Kamil Iskhakov (1991–1993 — City administration head; 1993–2005 — Mayor)
- Ilsur Metshin, since 17 November 2005 — Mayor
