= First Chechen War =

1994–1996 war between Russia and Chechen separatists

- Part of the Chechen–Russian conflict, the Wars in the Caucasus and post-Soviet conflicts
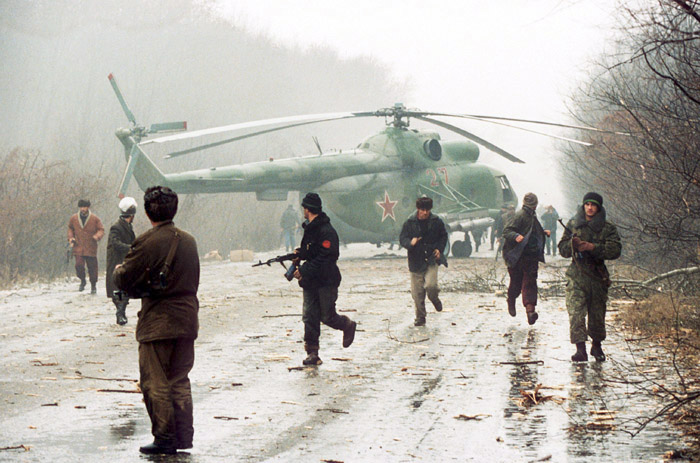
- A Russian Mil Mi-8 helicopter brought down by Chechen fighters near the Chechen capital of Grozny in 1994.
Date	11 December 1994 – 31 August 1996 (1 year, 8 months, 2 weeks and 6 days)
Location	Chechnya and parts of Ingushetia, Stavropol Krai and Dagestan
Result	Chechen victory; see § Aftermath

Belligerents
Chechen Republic of Ichkeria; Chechen Mujahideen	Russia; Chechen Republic of Russia

Commanders and leaders
(Chechen Republic of Ichkeria) Dzhokhar Dudayev X; (Chechen Republic of Ichkeria) Zelimkhan Yandarbiyev; (Chechen Republic of Ichkeria) Aslan Maskhadov; (Chechen Republic of Ichkeria) Ruslan Gelayev; (Chechen Republic of Ichkeria) Shamil Basayev; Ibn Al-Khattab	(Russia) Boris Yeltsin; (Russia) Pavel Grachev; (Russia) Anatoly Kulikov; (Russia) Anatoly Romanov; (Russia) Konstantin Pulikovsky; (Russia) Viktor Vorobyov †

Units involved
Chechen Armed Forces	Russian Armed Forces

Strength
(Chechen Republic of Ichkeria) 5,000–6,000 (late 1995)	(Russia) 40,000 (late-1994 offensive) (Note: U.S. and journalistic sources report an invasion force of roughly 40,000. A U.S. Army study notes Yeltsin deployed “over 40,000” troops in the December 1994 assault. Likewise, military histories state “some 40,000 Russian troops” entered Chechnya. These figures include combined MoD and Internal forces.) (Russia) 70,000+ (1995) (Note: In the expanded 2001 edition of "Russia and the USSR in the Wars of the 20th Century: Losses of the Armed Forces," a historical-statistical study edited by G. F. Krivosheev and published by OLMA-PRESS, based on declassified archival materials from the original 1993 monograph "Classification Mark Removed: Losses of the Armed Forces of the USSR in Wars, Combat Operations, and Military Conflicts." states that deployment was raised to 70.500 february 1995.)

Casualties and losses
- § Casualties and material damage

The First Chechen War, also referred to as the First Russo-Chechen War, was a conflict between the separatist Chechen Republic of Ichkeria and the Russian Federation from 1994 to 1996. The conflict ended in a peace treaty that saw Russian forces withdraw from the territory only for them to invade again three years later, sparking the Second Chechen War of 1999–2009.

During the dissolution of the Soviet Union in late 1991, Dzhokhar Dudayev with the support of the majority of Chechen populace established the Chechen Republic as a secessionist state, what became known as the Chechen Revolution. The conflict between Russia and Chechnya escalated quickly, and shortly after Chechnya proclaimed independence, Russian president Boris Yeltsin launched an attempt to suppress it, but it failed before any active fighting took place. Yeltsin supported militias in Chechnya loyal to the Russian government until 1994, when he launched a military operation to "establish constitutional order in Chechnya." Thousands of Chechen civilians were killed in aerial bombings and urban warfare before Grozny was captured in March 1995, but a Russian victory was denied as efforts to establish control over the remaining lowlands and mountainous regions of Chechnya were met with fierce resistance and frequent surprise raids by Chechen guerrillas. Despite the killing of Dudayev in a Russian airstrike in April 1996, the recapture of Grozny by separatists in August brought about the Khasavyurt Accord which ceased hostilities, and then the Russia–Chechnya Peace Treaty in 1997.

The official Russian estimate of Russian military deaths was 5,500, though independent estimates range from 5,000 to as high as 14,000. According to Aslan Maskhadov, approximately 2,800 Chechen fighters were killed, while independent sources estimate the number to be between 3,000 and 10,000. On the other hand, according to the Russian Ministry of Internal Affairs, by the end of 1995 alone, the losses of the Chechen militants amounted to some 10,000 to 15,000 killed. The number of Chechen civilian deaths was between 30,000 and 100,000. Over 200,000 Chechen civilians may have been injured, more than 500,000 people were displaced, and cities and towns were reduced to rubble across Chechnya.

== Origins ==
=== Chechen independence struggles from the 18th to early 20th century ===
Chechen resistance against Russian imperialism has occurred as early as 1785, during the rule of Sheikh Mansur, the first imam of the Caucasian peoples. Uniting various North-Caucasian nations under his command, Sheikh Mansur sought to repel the Russian invasion and expansion into the region. His forces inflicted high casualties on the Russians, but the insurgency was eventually suppressed after his capture and death in 1793.

A second major revolt occurred in 1834 under Imam Shamil which posed an even greater threat than the first uprising. Despite intense resistance during the 1817–1864 Caucasian War, Imperial Russian forces defeated the Chechens, annexed their lands, and deported thousands to the Middle East throughout the latter half of the 19th century. Despite the collapse of Shamil's revolt, the Tsarist hold over the Chechens remained tenuous. Another serious uprising happened during the Russo-Turkish War. By the mid-1890s, Russian authorities conceded that the Chechens were not "fully pacified".

Following the Russian Revolution and collapse of the Russian Empire in 1917, yet another major rebellion erupted in Chechnya from 1920–21. This effort to assert independence failed as it was harshly crushed by the Soviets, and by 1922 Chechnya had been incorporated into the Russian Soviet Federative Socialist Republic (RSFSR) – the largest member state of the newly-formed Soviet Union (USSR). In 1936, Soviet leader Joseph Stalin established the Checheno-Ingush Autonomous Soviet Socialist Republic, within the RSFSR.

=== Chechen insurrection of 1940–1944 and post-WWII ethnic cleansing ===
In 1944, on the orders of NKVD chief Lavrentiy Beria, more than 500,000 Chechens, Ingush and several other North Caucasian peoples were ethnically cleansed and deported to Siberia and Central Asia. The official pretext was punishment for collaboration with invading German forces during the 1940–1944 insurgency in Chechnya, despite the fact that many Chechens and Ingush were loyal to the Soviet government and fought against the Nazis, some even receiving the highest military awards in the Soviet Union (such as Khanpasha Nuradilov and Movlid Visaitov). In March 1944, the Soviet authorities abolished the Checheno-Ingush Republic. Eventually, Soviet first secretary Nikita Khrushchev granted the Chechen and Ingush peoples permission to return to their homeland and he restored their republic in 1957.

=== Dissolution of the Soviet Union and the Russian Federation treaty ===
Russia became an independent state after the dissolution of the Soviet Union in December 1991. The Russian Federation was widely accepted as the successor state to the Soviet Union, but it lost a significant amount of its military and economic power. Ethnic Russians made up more than 80% of the population of the RSFSR, but significant ethnic and religious differences posed a threat of political disintegration in some regions. During the Soviet period, some of Russia's approximately 100 ethnic groups were granted ethnic enclaves that had various formal federal rights attached. Relations of these entities with the federal government and demands for autonomy erupted into a major political issue in the early 1990s. Boris Yeltsin incorporated these demands into his 1990 election campaign by claiming that their resolution was a high priority of his.

By 1991, the Chechen national movement was increasingly growing and enjoying more support among the Chechen populace. While Mikhail Gorbachev tended to support national sentiments of the Russian minority regions by declaring them "subjects of the USSR" and giving them the role of signatories equal with the chief Soviet Republics in the projects of the new Union treaty, hoping to weaken the power and influence of Yeltsin and the Russian SFSR, as Olga Vasil'eva notes, "unlike in other [autonomous] republics, the idea of breaking away from Russia was popular among most Chechens [in 1991]."

There was an urgent need for a law to clearly define the powers of each federal subject. Such a law was passed on 31 March 1992, when Yeltsin and Ruslan Khasbulatov, then chairman of the Russian Supreme Soviet and an ethnic Chechen himself, signed the Federation Treaty bilaterally with 86 out of 88 federal subjects. In almost all cases, demands for greater autonomy or independence were satisfied by concessions of regional autonomy and tax privileges. The treaty outlined three basic types of federal subjects and the powers that were reserved for the local and federal governments. The only federal subjects that did not sign the treaty were Chechnya and Tatarstan. Eventually, in early 1994, Yeltsin signed a special political accord with Mintimer Shaimiev, the president of Tatarstan, granting many of Tatarstan's demands for greater autonomy within Russia. Thus, Chechnya remained the only federal subject that did not sign the treaty. Neither Yeltsin nor the Chechen government attempted any serious negotiations.

There was no agreement in Moscow on how to act on Chechnya: while Khasbulatov sought to co-opt the Chechen nationalists, hoping to make Dudayev his "viceregent" in the unified Chechen-Ingush autonomy of Russia, Aleksandr Rutskoy, Yeltsin's vice president, openly called for a violent crackdown on Chechnya and spoke of it from the standpoint of Russian nationalism; under Rutskoy, the Supreme Soviet passed resolutions proclaiming the new de facto Chechen authorities illegal, named the Provisional Council the sole legal authority in Chechnya and named the leading figures of the Provisional Council. By October 1991, all three heads of the Russian SFSR - Rutskoy, Khasbulatov and Yeltsin - would agree on the necessity of a forced suppression of Chechnya and were preparing an invasion of Chechnya by the Russian internal troops.

=== Chechen declaration of independence ===
On 6 September 1991, militants of the All-National Congress of the Chechen People (NCChP) political party, created by the former Soviet Air Force general Dzhokhar Dudayev, stormed a session of the Supreme Soviet of the Checheno-Ingush Autonomous Soviet Socialist Republic, with the aim of asserting Chechen independence. The storming caused the death of the head of the Grozny branch of the Communist Party of the Soviet Union Vitaliy Kutsenko, who was defenestrated or fell while trying to escape. This effectively dissolved the government of the Checheno-Ingush ASSR.

Elections for the president and parliament of Chechnya were held on 27 October 1991. The day before, the Supreme Soviet of the Soviet Union published a notice in the local Chechen press that the elections were illegal. With a turnout of 72%, 90.1% voted for Dudayev. Dudayev won overwhelming popular support to oust the interim administration supported by the central government. He became president and declared independence from the Soviet Union. As John B. Dunlop wrote, the elections were held under the lack of stable institutions and irregularities; yet, according to polling in Chechnya and other data, Dudayev indeed had the support of the majority of populace among Chechens, so at least in this way, the elections expressed the popular will in Chechnya. Russian Major General Sokolov, the participant of the war, in his report would later give an estimate of the result slightly different from the one published by the government of Chechnya, but close to it nevertheless: 85% of votes for Dudayev with a turnout of 77%.

In November 1991, Yeltsin dispatched interior ministry troops to Grozny who were supposed to begin a military-police operation, but they were forced to withdraw when Dudayev's forces surrounded them at the airport. A large factor in making the Russian 'invasion' fail before any fighting was Yeltsin's absence, characteristic of him in crisis situations, while Gorbachev protested the crackdown and intervened to stop it, believing that it would lead to a large-scale war similar to the one which recently occurred in Afghanistan. This operation further consolidated the nationalist sentiments in Chechnya and raised support for Dudayev.

After Chechnya made its initial declaration of sovereignty, the Checheno-Ingush Autonomous Republic split in two in June 1992 amidst the armed conflict between the Ingush and Ossetians. The newly created Republic of Ingushetia then joined the Russian Federation, while Chechnya declared full independence from Moscow in 1993 as the Chechen Republic of Ichkeria (ChRI).

== Internal conflict in Chechnya and Grozny–Moscow tensions ==
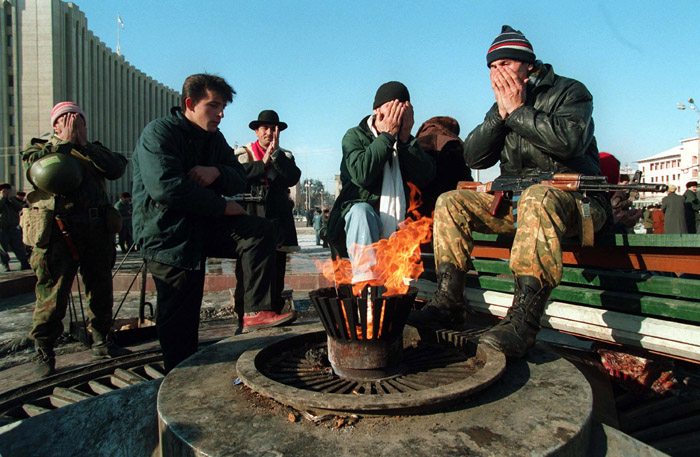
Dudayev's supporters pray in front of the Presidential Palace in Grozny, 1994

The economy of Chechnya collapsed as Dudayev severed economic links with Russia while black market trading, arms trafficking and counterfeiting grew. Violence and social disruption increased and the marginal social groups, such as unemployed young men from the countryside, became armed. Ethnic Russians and other non-Chechens faced constant harassment as they fell outside the vendetta system which protected the Chechens to a certain extent. From 1991 to 1994, tens of thousands of people of non-Chechen ethnicity left the republic.

During the undeclared Chechen civil war, factions both sympathetic and opposed to Dudayev fought for power, sometimes in pitched battles with the use of heavy weapons. In March 1993, the opposition attempted a coup d'état, but their attempt was crushed by force. A month later, Dudayev introduced direct presidential rule, and in June 1993 dissolved the Chechen parliament to avoid a referendum on a vote of non-confidence. In late October 1992, Russian forces dispatched to the zone of the Ossetian-Ingush conflict were ordered to move to the Chechen border; Dudayev, who perceived this as "an act of aggression against the Chechen Republic", declared a state of emergency and threatened general mobilization if the Russian troops did not withdraw from the Chechen border. To prevent an invasion of Chechnya, he did not provoke the Russian troops.

After staging another coup d'état attempt in December 1993, the opposition organized themselves into the Provisional Council of the Chechen Republic as an alternative government of Chechnya, calling on Moscow for assistance. In August 1994, the coalition of the opposition factions based in north Chechnya launched a large-scale armed campaign to remove Dudayev's government.

However, the issue at hand was not independence from Russia; even the opposition stated there was no alternative to an international boundary separating Chechnya from Russia. In 1992, Russian newspaper Moscow News noted that, just like most of the other seceding republics, other than Tatarstan, ethnic Chechens universally supported the establishment of an independent Chechen state and, in 1995, during the heat of the First Chechen War, Khalid Delmayev, a Dudayev opponent belonging to an Ichkerian liberal coalition, stated that "Chechnya's statehood may be postponed ... but cannot be avoided".

Moscow covertly supplied opposition forces with finances, military equipment and mercenaries. Russia also suspended all civilian flights to Grozny while the aviation and border troops established a military blockade of the republic, and eventually unmarked Russian aircraft began combat operations over Chechnya. The opposition forces, who were joined by Russian troops, launched a poorly organized assault on Grozny in mid-October 1994, followed by a second, larger attack on 26–27 November 1994. Despite Russian support, both attempts were unsuccessful. Chechen separatists succeeded in capturing some 20 regulars of the Russian Ground Forces and about 50 other Russian citizens who were covertly hired by the Russian FSK state security organization (which was later converted to the FSB) to fight for the Provisional Council forces. On 29 November, Yeltsin issued an ultimatum to all warring factions in Chechnya, ordering them to disarm and surrender. When the government in Grozny refused, Yeltsin ordered the Russian army to invade the region. Both the Russian government and military command never referred to the conflict as a war, but instead a "disarmament of illegal gangs" or a "restoration of the constitutional order".

Beginning on 1 December, Russian forces openly carried out heavy aerial bombardments of Chechnya. On 11 December 1994, five days after Dudayev and Russian Minister of Defense Gen. Pavel Grachev of Russia had agreed to "avoid the further use of force", Russian forces entered the republic in order to "establish constitutional order in Chechnya and to preserve the territorial integrity of Russia". Grachev boasted he could topple Dudayev in a couple of hours with a single airborne regiment, and proclaimed that it will be "a bloodless blitzkrieg, that would not last any longer than 20 December".

== Initial stages of conflict ==
=== Initial conflict ===
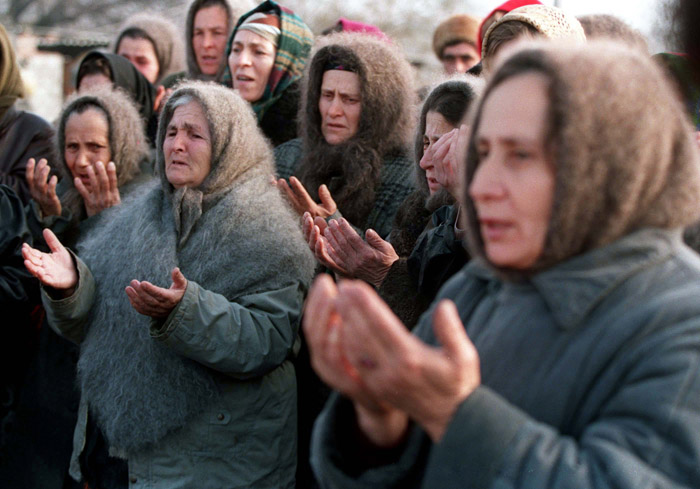
Chechen women praying for Russian troops not to advance on Grozny, December 1994

On 11 December 1994, approximately 40,000 Russian troops crossed the border into Chechnya, launching a three-pronged ground offensive aimed at blockading Grozny and forcing Dudayev to negotiate on Moscow's terms. The move was a surprise even to senior army officials, who had only been informed of it days earlier, as well as Deputy Nationalities Minister Vyacheslav Mikhailov, who departed the same day to begin peace talks and only learned of the invasion while boarding his plane in Moscow. Within hours, the advance was halted by attacks from civilians, who had not planned for this situation. In Dagestan, civilians blocked the tanks, pleading with the soldiers not to go. In Ingushetia, the column advancing from Vladikavkaz was stopped by protesters opposed to the use of force against their Chechen "brothers". The latter protest turned violent, resulting in the deaths of five Ingush civilians and one soldier.

Only the northern column came close to Grozny, before being halted three days later by unexpected Chechen resistance at Dolinsky, 15 miles (24 km) from Grozny.

The main attack was temporarily halted by the deputy commander of the Russian Ground Forces, General Eduard Vorobyov, who then resigned in protest, stating that it is "a crime" to "send the army against its own people." Many in the Russian military and government opposed the war as well. Yeltsin's adviser on nationality affairs, Emil Pain, and Russia's Deputy Minister of Defense General Boris Gromov (commander of the Afghan War), also resigned in protest of the invasion ("It will be a bloodbath, another Afghanistan", Gromov said on television), as did General Boris Poliakov. More than 800 professional soldiers and officers refused to take part in the operation; of these, 83 were convicted by military courts and the rest were discharged. Later General Lev Rokhlin also refused to be decorated as a Hero of the Russian Federation for his part in the war.

Units of Chechen fighters inflicted severe losses on the Russian troops. Deeper in Chechnya, a group of 50 Russian paratroopers was captured by the local Chechen militia, after being deployed by helicopters behind enemy lines to capture a Chechen weapons cache. On 29 December, in a rare instance of a Russian outright victory, the Russian airborne forces seized the military airfield next to Grozny and repelled a Chechen counter-attack in the Battle of Khankala; the next objective was the city itself. With the Russians closing in on the capital, the Chechens began to set up defensive fighting positions and grouped their forces in the city.

=== Storming of Grozny ===
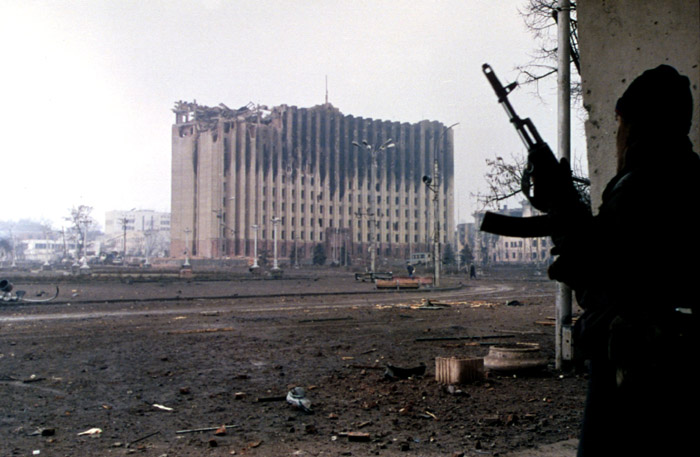
A Chechen fighter near the burned-out ruins of the Presidential Palace in Grozny, January 1995

When the Russians besieged Grozny, thousands of civilians died from a week-long series of air raids and artillery bombardments in the heaviest bombing campaign in Europe since the destruction of Dresden. The initial assault on New Year's Eve 1994 ended in a big Russian defeat, resulting in many casualties and at first a nearly complete breakdown of morale in the Russian forces. The fighting claimed the lives of an estimated 1,000 to 2,000 Russian soldiers, mostly barely trained conscripts; the worst losses were inflicted on the 131st 'Maikop' Motor Rifle Brigade, which was destroyed in the fighting near the central railway station. Despite the early Chechen defeat of the New Year's assault and the many further casualties that the Russians had suffered, Grozny was eventually conquered by Russian forces after an urban warfare campaign. After armored assaults failed, the Russian military set out to take the city using air power and artillery. At the same time, the Russian military accused the Chechen fighters of using civilians as human shields by preventing them from leaving the capital as it was bombarded. On 7 January 1995, the Russian Major-General Viktor Vorobyov was killed by mortar fire, becoming the first on a long list of Russian generals to be killed in Chechnya. On 19 January, despite many casualties, Russian forces seized the ruins of the Chechen presidential palace, which had been fought over for more than three weeks as the Chechens abandoned their positions in the ruins of the downtown area. The battle for the southern part of the city continued until the official end on 6 March 1995.

By the estimates of Yeltsin's human rights adviser Sergei Kovalev, about 27,000 civilians died in the first five weeks of fighting. The Russian historian and general Dmitri Volkogonov said the Russian military's bombardment of Grozny killed around 35,000 civilians, including 5,000 children and that the vast majority of those killed were ethnic Russians. While military casualties are not known, the Russian side admitted to having 2,000 soldiers killed or missing. The bloodbath of Grozny shocked Russia and the outside world, inciting severe criticism of the war. International monitors from the Organization for Security and Co-operation in Europe (OSCE) described the scenes as nothing short of an "unimaginable catastrophe", while former Soviet leader Mikhail Gorbachev called the war a "disgraceful, bloody adventure" and German chancellor Helmut Kohl called it "sheer madness".

In February, a group of Wahhabi Mujahideen, primarily composed of Saudi and North African Arabs, entered Chechnya under the leadership of Ibn al-Khattab to wage jihad wherever needed. While they participated in ambushes, they were more useful to Chechens due to Khattab's financial resources rather than his military prowess.

=== Continued Russian offensive ===
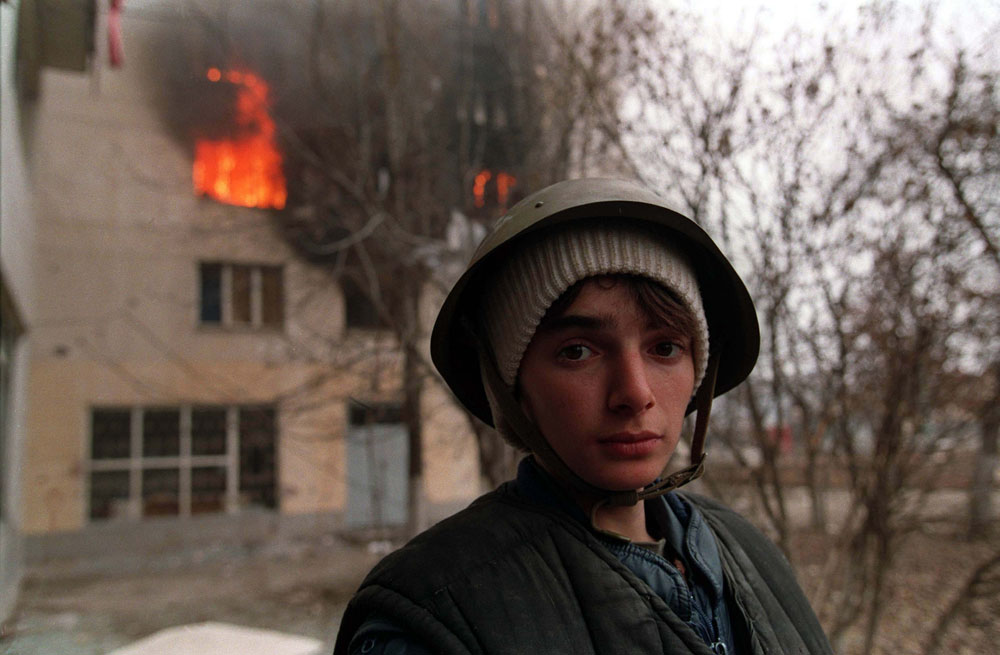
A Chechen standing near a burning house in Grozny

Following the fall of Grozny, the Russian government slowly and methodically expanded its control over the lowland areas and then into the mountains. In what was dubbed the worst massacre in the war, the OMON and other federal forces killed up to 300 civilians while seizing the border village of Samashki on 7 April (several hundred more were detained and beaten or otherwise tortured). In the southern mountains, the Russians launched an offensive along all the front on 15 April, advancing in large columns of 200–300 vehicles. The ChRI forces defended the city of Argun, moving their military headquarters first to surrounded Shali, then shortly after to the village of Serzhen'-Yurt as they were forced into the mountains and finally to Shamil Basayev's ancestral stronghold of Vedeno. Chechnya's second-largest city of Gudermes was surrendered without a fight but the village of Shatoy was fought for and defended by the men of Ruslan Gelayev. Eventually, the Chechen command withdrew from the area of Vedeno to the Chechen opposition-aligned village of Dargo and from there to Benoy. According to an estimate cited in a United States Army analysis report, between January and May 1995, when the Russian forces conquered most of the republic in the conventional campaign, their losses in Chechnya were approximately 2,800 killed, 10,000 wounded and more than 500 missing or captured. Some Chechen fighters infiltrated occupied areas, hiding in crowds of returning refugees.

As the war continued, the Chechens resorted to mass hostage-takings, attempting to influence the Russian public and leadership. In June 1995, a group led by the maverick field commander Basayev took more than 1,500 people hostage in southern Russia in the Budyonnovsk hospital hostage crisis; about 120 Russian civilians died before a ceasefire was signed after negotiations between Basayev and the Russian prime minister Viktor Chernomyrdin. The raid forced a temporary stop in Russian military operations, giving the Chechens time to regroup and to prepare for the national militant campaign. The full-scale Russian attack led many of Dudayev's opponents to side with his forces and thousands of volunteers to swell the ranks of mobile militant units. Many others formed local self-defence militia units to defend their settlements in the case of federal offensive action, officially numbering 5,000–6,000 armed men in late 1995. According to a UN report, the Chechen Armed Forces included a large number of child soldiers, some as young as 11 years old, and also included females. As the territory controlled by them shrank, the Chechens increasingly resorted to classic guerrilla warfare tactics, such as booby traps and mining roads in enemy-held territory. The use of improvised explosive devices was particularly noteworthy; they also exploited a combination of mines and ambushes.

On 6 October 1995, Gen. Anatoliy Romanov, the federal commander in Chechnya at the time, was critically injured and paralyzed in a bomb blast in Grozny. Suspicion of responsibility for the attack fell on rogue elements of the Russian military, as the attack destroyed hopes for a permanent ceasefire based on the developing trust between Romanov and the ChRI Chief of Staff Aslan Maskhadov, a former colonel in the Soviet Army; in August, the two went to southern Chechnya to try to convince the local commanders to release Russian prisoners. In February 1996, federal and pro-Russian Chechen forces in Grozny opened fire on a massive pro-independence peace march of tens of thousands of people, killing a number of demonstrators. The ruins of the presidential palace, the symbol of Chechen independence, were then demolished two days later.

== Chechen counter-offensive and Russian withdrawal (1996) ==
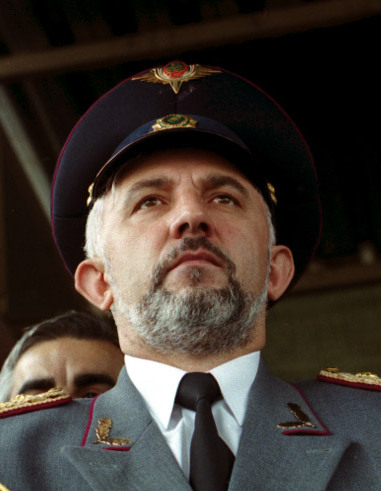
Aslan Maskhadov, who devised the plan for Operation Jihad and signed the Khasavyurt Accord

In early 1996, Chechen forces launched a series of offensives to break the strategic stalemate. On 6 March, Chechen fighters infiltrated Grozny in a surprise raid, capturing weapons caches and inflicting heavy casualties on Russian federal troops before withdrawing. Following this, on 16 April, Chechen forces successfully ambushed a Russian armored column near Shatoy, killing nearly 220 soldiers, followed by another attack near Vedeno which resulted in at least 28 Russian deaths. As military defeats mounted and the war became increasingly unpopular in Russia approaching the 1996 Russian presidential election, the government of Boris Yeltsin sought a way to de-escalate. Although the Chechen president Dzhokhar Dudayev was assassinated by a Russian guided missile on 21 April 1996, Chechen resistance continued unabated under the acting president Zelimkhan Yandarbiyev.

On 6 August 1996, while Russian troops were moving south for a planned final offensive against mountain strongholds, Chechen forces launched a massive counter-offensive known as Operation Jihad. Led by Aslan Maskhadov and Shamil Basayev, 1,500 Chechen fighters infiltrated Grozny and, within hours, surrounded Russian garrisons and the government compound. Russian attempts to relieve the trapped units were repulsed with heavy casualties; the 276th Motorized Regiment alone suffered 50% losses in a two-day attempt to reach the city center. Chechen forces also seized control of Argun and Gudermes, effectively reversing Russian gains.

On 19 August, Russian commander Konstantin Pulikovsky issued an ultimatum for Chechen fighters to leave Grozny within 48 hours or face destruction by strategic bombers. The ultimatum was widely criticized, with Yeltsin's national security adviser Alexander Lebed calling it a "bad joke" given the inability of federal forces to retake the city. Recognizing the military collapse, Lebed began negotiations with Maskhadov, leading to the signing of the Khasavyurt Accord on 31 August 1996. The agreement stipulated the withdrawal of all federal forces from Chechnya by 31 December 1996 and deferred the decision on Chechnya's status until 2001.

== Human rights violations and war crimes ==
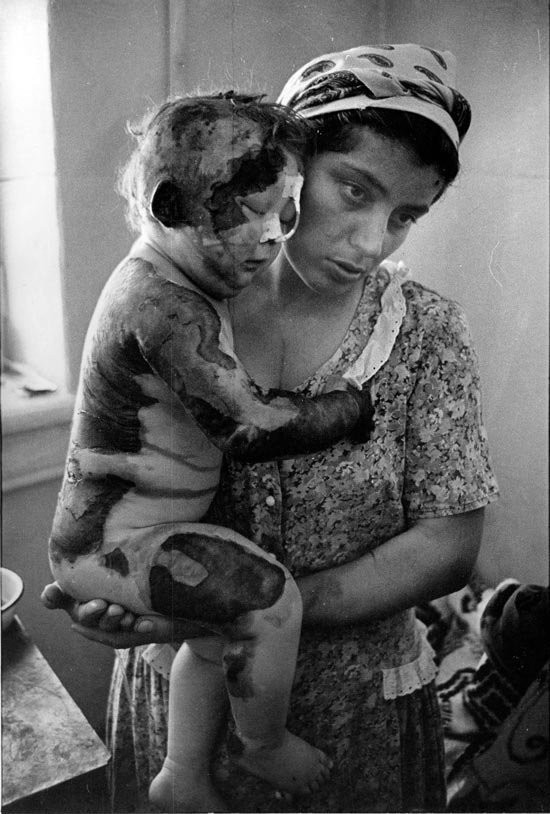
A Chechen woman with a wounded child

Human rights organizations accused Russian forces of engaging in indiscriminate and disproportionate use of force whenever they encountered resistance, resulting in numerous civilian deaths. (According to Human Rights Watch (HRW), Russian artillery and rocket attacks killed at least 267 civilians during the December 1995 raid by the Chechens on the city of Gudermes.) Throughout the span of the first Chechen war, Russian forces were accused by human rights organizations of starting a brutal war with total disregard for humanitarian law, causing tens of thousands of unnecessary civilian casualties among the Chechen population. The main strategy in the Russian war effort had been to use heavy artillery and air strikes leading to numerous indiscriminate attacks on civilians. This has led to Western and Chechen sources calling the Russian strategy deliberate terror bombing on parts of Russia. According to HRW, the campaign was "unparalleled in the area since World War II for its scope and destructiveness, followed by months of indiscriminate and targeted fire against civilians". Due to ethnic Chechens in Grozny seeking refuge among their respective teips in the surrounding villages of the countryside, a high proportion of initial civilian casualties were inflicted against ethnic Russians who were unable to find viable escape routes. The villages were also attacked from the first weeks of the conflict (Russian cluster bombs, for example, killed at least 55 civilians during the 3 January 1995 Shali cluster bomb attack).

Russian soldiers often prevented civilians from evacuating areas of imminent danger and prevented humanitarian organizations from assisting civilians in need. It was widely alleged that Russian troops, especially those belonging to the Internal Troops (MVD), committed numerous and in part systematic acts of torture and summary executions on Chechen civilians; they were often linked to zachistka ("cleansing" raids on town districts and villages suspected of harboring boyeviki – militants). Humanitarian and aid groups chronicled persistent patterns of Russian soldiers killing, raping and looting civilians at random, often in disregard of their nationality. Chechen fighters took hostages on a massive scale, kidnapped or killed Chechens considered to be collaborators and mistreated civilian captives and federal prisoners of war (especially pilots). Russian federal forces kidnapped hostages for ransom and used human shields for cover during the fighting and movement of troops (for example, a group of surrounded Russian troops took approximately 500 civilian hostages at Grozny's 9th Municipal Hospital).

The violations committed by members of the Russian forces were usually tolerated by their superiors and were not punished even when investigated (the story of Vladimir Glebov serving as an example of such policy). Television and newspaper accounts widely reported largely uncensored images of the carnage to the Russian public. The Russian media coverage partially precipitated a loss of public confidence in the government and a steep decline in Yeltsin's popularity. Chechnya was one of the heaviest burdens on Yeltsin's 1996 presidential election campaign. The protracted war in Chechnya, especially many reports of extreme violence against civilians, ignited fear and contempt of Russia among other ethnic groups in the federation. One of the most notable war crimes committed by the Russian army is the Samashki massacre, in which it is estimated that up to 300 civilians died during the attack. Russian forces conducted an operation of zachistka, house-by-house searches throughout the entire village. Federal soldiers deliberately and arbitrarily attacked civilians and civilian dwellings in Samashki by shooting residents and burning houses with flame-throwers. They wantonly opened fire or threw grenades into basements where residents, mostly women, elderly persons and children, had been hiding. Russian troops intentionally burned many bodies, either by throwing the bodies into burning houses or by setting them on fire. A Chechen surgeon, Khassan Baiev, treated wounded in Samashki immediately after the operation and described the scene in his book:

Dozens of charred corpses of women and children lay in the courtyard of the mosque, which had been destroyed. The first thing my eye fell on was the burned body of a baby, lying in fetal position ... A wild-eyed woman emerged from a burned-out house holding a dead baby. Trucks with bodies piled in the back rolled through the streets on the way to the cemetery.

While treating the wounded, I heard stories of young men – gagged and trussed up – dragged with chains behind personnel carriers. I heard of Russian aviators who threw Chechen prisoners, screaming, out their helicopters. There were rapes, but it was hard to know how many because women were too ashamed to report them. One girl was raped in front of her father. I heard of one case in which the mercenary grabbed a newborn baby, threw it among each other like a ball, then shot it dead in the air.

Leaving the village for the hospital in Grozny, I passed a Russian armored personnel carrier with the word SAMASHKI written on its side in bold, black letters. I looked in my rearview mirror and to my horror saw a human skull mounted on the front of the vehicle. The bones were white; someone must have boiled the skull to remove the flesh.

Major Vyacheslav Izmailov is said to have rescued at least 174 people from captivity on both sides in the war, was later involved in the tracing of missing persons after the war and in 2021 won the hero's prize at the Stalker Human Rights Film Festival in Moscow. Zainap Gashaeva photographed and recorded war crimes during the war; her work was later used in a 2011 online archive created by the Society for Threatened Peoples to help with the investigation of unpunished war crimes.

== Spread of the war ==
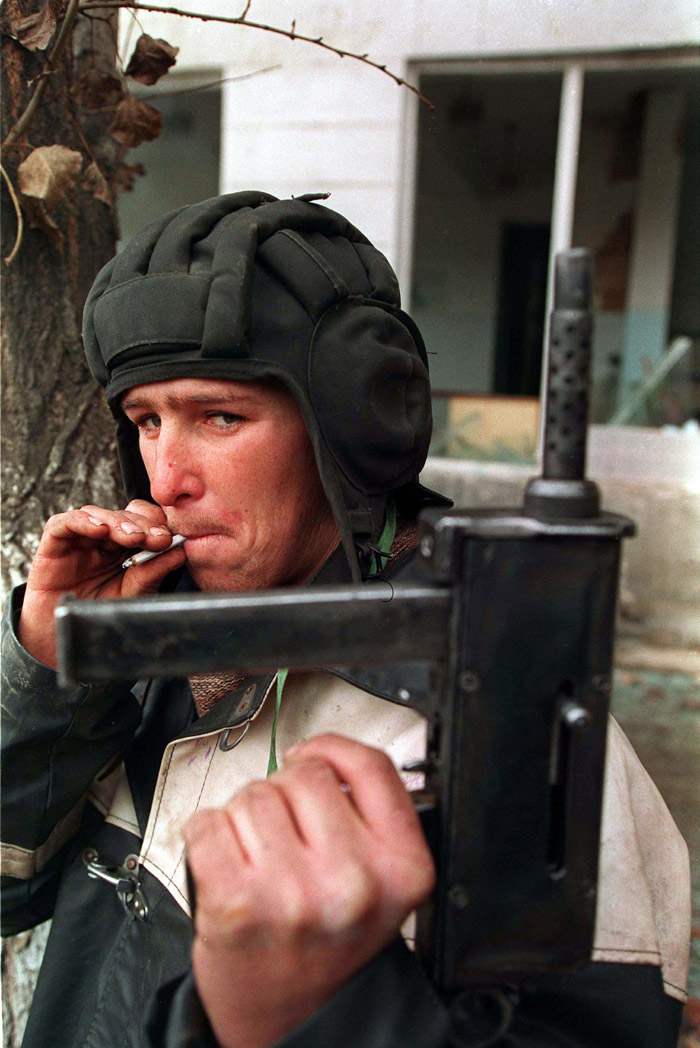
Chechen irregular fighter with a Borz submachine gun

The declaration by Chechnya's Chief Mufti Akhmad Kadyrov that the ChRI was waging a jihad (struggle) against Russia raised the spectre that jihadis from other regions and even outside Russia would enter the war.

Limited fighting occurred in the neighbouring small republic of Ingushetia, mostly when Russian commanders sent troops over the border in pursuit of Chechen fighters, while as many as 200,000 refugees (from Chechnya and the conflict in North Ossetia) strained Ingushetia's already weak economy. On several occasions, Ingush president Ruslan Aushev protested incursions by Russian soldiers and even threatened to sue the Russian Ministry of Defence for damages inflicted, recalling how the federal forces previously assisted in the expulsion of the Ingush population from North Ossetia. Undisciplined Russian soldiers were also reported to be committing murders, rapes, and looting in Ingushetia (in an incident partially witnessed by visiting Russian Duma deputies, at least nine Ingush civilians and an ethnic Bashkir soldier were murdered by apparently drunk Russian soldiers; earlier, drunken Russian soldiers killed another Russian soldier, five Ingush villagers and even Ingushetia's Health Minister).

Much larger and more deadly acts of hostility took place in the Republic of Dagestan. In particular, the border village of Pervomayskoye was completely destroyed by Russian forces in January 1996 in reaction to the large-scale Chechen hostage taking in Kizlyar in Dagestan (in which more than 2,000 hostages were taken), bringing strong criticism from this hitherto loyal republic and escalating domestic dissatisfaction. The Don Cossacks of Southern Russia, originally sympathetic to the Chechen cause, turned hostile as a result of their Russian-esque culture and language, stronger affinity to Moscow than to Grozny, and a history of conflict with indigenous peoples such as the Chechens. The Kuban Cossacks started organizing themselves against the Chechens, including manning paramilitary roadblocks against infiltration of their territories.

Meanwhile, the war in Chechnya spawned new forms of resistance to the federal government. Opposition to the conscription of men from minority ethnic groups to fight in Chechnya was widespread among other republics, many of which passed laws and decrees on the subject. For example, the government of Chuvashia passed a decree providing legal protection to soldiers from the republic who refused to participate in the Chechen war and imposed limits on the use of the federal army in ethnic or regional conflicts within Russia. Tatarstan president Mintimer Shaimiev vocally opposed the war and appealed to Yeltsin to stop it and return conscripts, warning the conflict was at risk of expanding across the Caucasus. Some regional and local legislative bodies called for the prohibition on the use of draftees in quelling internal conflicts, while others demanded a total ban on the use of the armed forces in such situations. Russian government officials feared that a move to end the war short of victory would create a cascade of secession attempts by other ethnic minorities.

On 16 January 1996, a Turkish passenger ship carrying 200 Russian passengers was taken over by what were mostly Turkish gunmen who were seeking to publicize the Chechen cause. On 6 March, a Cypriot passenger jet was hijacked by Chechen sympathisers while flying toward Germany. Both of these incidents were resolved through negotiations, and the hijackers surrendered without any fatalities being inflicted.

== Aftermath ==
The war concluded with the complete withdrawal of Russian troops and the preservation of Chechnya's de facto independence. Military analysts and historians characterize the outcome as a Chechen victory and a Russian defeat. The Foreign Military Studies Office (FMSO) case study notes that the conflict "resulted in Russian defeat" as federal forces failed to eradicate the rebellion or reintegrate the republic. Similarly, Russian analysts such as Alexander Khramchikhin have stated that Russia was "defeated" in the conflict, while other international studies have described the result as a "Pyrrhic victory" for Chechnya. Following the peace treaty, Maskhadov was elected president of the Chechen Republic of Ichkeria in January 1997.

=== Casualties and material damage ===
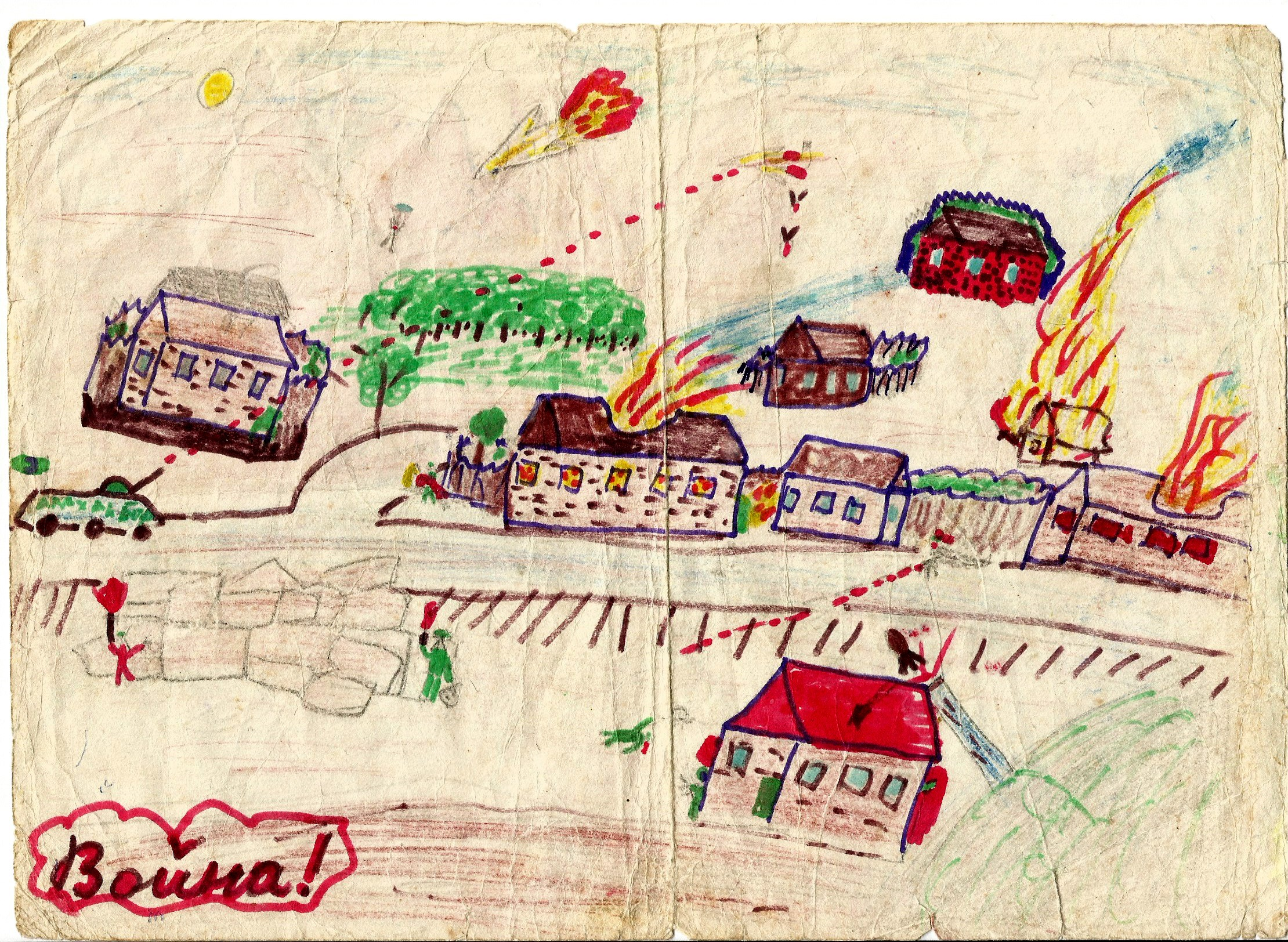
Drawing by 10-year-old Polina Zherebtsova from her diary, showing the battle of Grozny.

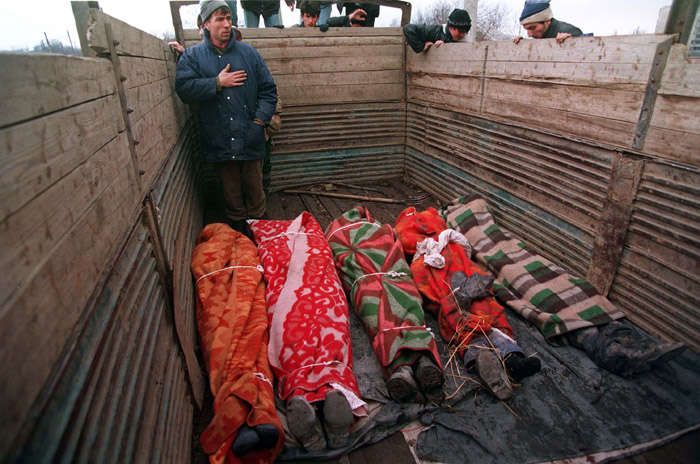
Dead bodies on a truck in Grozny

According to the General Staff of the Russian Armed Forces, 3,826 troops were killed, 17,892 troops were wounded, and 1,906 troops are missing in action. The official Russian figure put 5,500. According to Krivosheev, the authoritative Russian military historian, 5,042 Russian soldiers died during the war and 510 went missing, 16,098 Russian soldiers were wounded and 35,289 became diseased. Later, independent researcher Pavel Milyukov estimated the losses at 5,391 dead. According to the independent Memorial agency, the Russians lost 4,379 dead in Chechnya, 703 missing and 705 deserters. However, the Committee of Soldiers' Mothers of Russia estimated that the total number of Russian military deaths was 14,000, based on information which it collected from wounded troops and soldiers' relatives (only counting regular troops, i.e. not the kontraktniki (contract soldiers, not conscripts) and members of the special service forces). In 2009, the official number of Russian troops who fought in the two wars and were still missing in Chechnya and presumed dead was some 700, while about 400 remains of the missing servicemen were said to have been recovered up to that point. The Russian military was notorious for hiding casualties.

Let me tell you about one specific case. I knew for sure that on this day – it was the end of February or the beginning of March 1995 – forty servicemen of the Joint Group were killed. And they bring me information about fifteen. I ask: "Why don't you take into account the rest?" They hesitated: "Well, you see, 40 is a lot. We'd better spread those losses over a few days." Of course, I was outraged by these manipulations.

— Anatoly Kulikov

It is impossible to determine the exact losses of the militants. According to Maskhadov, approximately 2,800 Chechen fighters were killed, while independent sources estimate the number to be between 3,000 and 10,000. Subsequently, the Maskhadov figure migrated to the work of Grigory Krivosheev, his data was accepted as the official Russian side. The Russian military has privately claimed the deaths of 4,000–4,500 Chechens. At the end of 1995, in the article by I. Rotar “Chechnya: a long-standing turmoil” (Izvestia. - No. 204. – 27 November 1995. – P. 4), with reference to the Russian Ministry of Internal Affairs, information was given that during the year of military actions about 26,000 people died, of which 2,000 Russian military personnel and 10–15,000 Chechen fighters, the rest were civilians (that is, from 9,000 to 14,000) Evgeny Norin notes, these figures are clearly inaccurate. He also suggested that it was impossible to determine the losses of the Chechen side, but expressed the theory that they were hardly much less than those of the Russians.

According to the World Peace Foundation at Tufts University,

Estimates of the number of civilians killed range widely from 20,000 to 100,000, with the latter figure commonly referenced by Chechen sources. Most scholars and human rights organizations generally estimate the number of civilian casualties to be 40,000; this figure is attributed to the research and scholarship of Chechnya expert John Dunlop, who estimates that the total number of civilian casualties is at least 35,000. This range is also consistent with post-war publications by the Russian statistics office estimating 30,000 to 40,000 civilians killed. The Moscow-based human rights organization, Memorial, which actively documented human rights abuses throughout the war, estimates the number of civilian casualties to be a slightly higher at 50,000.

Russian Interior Minister Anatoly Kulikov claimed that fewer than 20,000 civilians were killed. Médecins Sans Frontières estimated a death toll of 50,000 people out of a population of 1,000,000. Sergey Kovalyov's team could offer their conservative, documented estimate of more than 50,000 civilian deaths. Lebed asserted that 80,000 to 100,000 had been killed and 240,000 had been injured. The number given by the ChRI authorities was about 100,000 killed.

According to claims made by Sergey Govorukhin which were published in the Russian newspaper Gazeta, approximately 35,000 ethnic Russian civilians were killed by Russian forces which operated in Chechnya, most of them were killed during the bombardment of Grozny.

Approximately 40,000 housing units were damaged or destroyed by July 1996.

=== Prisoners and missing persons ===
In the Khasavyurt Accord, both sides agreed to an "all for all" exchange of prisoners to be carried out at the end of the war. However, despite this commitment, many persons remained forcibly detained. A partial analysis of the list of 1,432 reported missing found that, as of 30 October 1996, at least 139 Chechens were still being forcibly detained by the Russian side; it was entirely unclear how many of these men were alive. As of mid-January 1997, the Chechens still held between 700 and 1,000 Russian soldiers and officers as prisoners of war, according to HRW. According to Amnesty International that same month, 1,058 Russian soldiers and officers were being detained by Chechen fighters who were willing to release them in exchange for members of Chechen armed groups. American freelance journalist Andrew Shumack has been missing from Grozny since July 1995 and is presumed dead.

Major Vyacheslav Izmailov, who had rescued at least 174 people from captivity on both sides in the war, was later involved in the search for missing persons. He was honoured as the human rights hero in the Stalker Human Rights Film Festival after he featured in Anna Artemyeva's film Don't Shoot at the Bald Man!, which won the jury prize for Best Documentary at the festival in Moscow. He later worked as military correspondent for Novaya Gazeta, was part of the team of journalists investigating the murder of journalist Anna Politkovskaya in 2006 He also helped families to find their sons who had gone missing in the Chechen war.

=== Moscow peace treaty ===
Street in Grozny after the war

The Khasavyurt Accord paved the way for the signing of two further agreements between Russia and Chechnya. In mid-November 1996, Yeltsin and Maskhadov signed an agreement on economic relations and reparations to Chechens who had been affected by the 1994–96 war. In February 1997, Russia also approved an amnesty for Russian soldiers and Chechen fighters alike who committed illegal acts in connection with the War in Chechnya between December 1994 and September 1996.

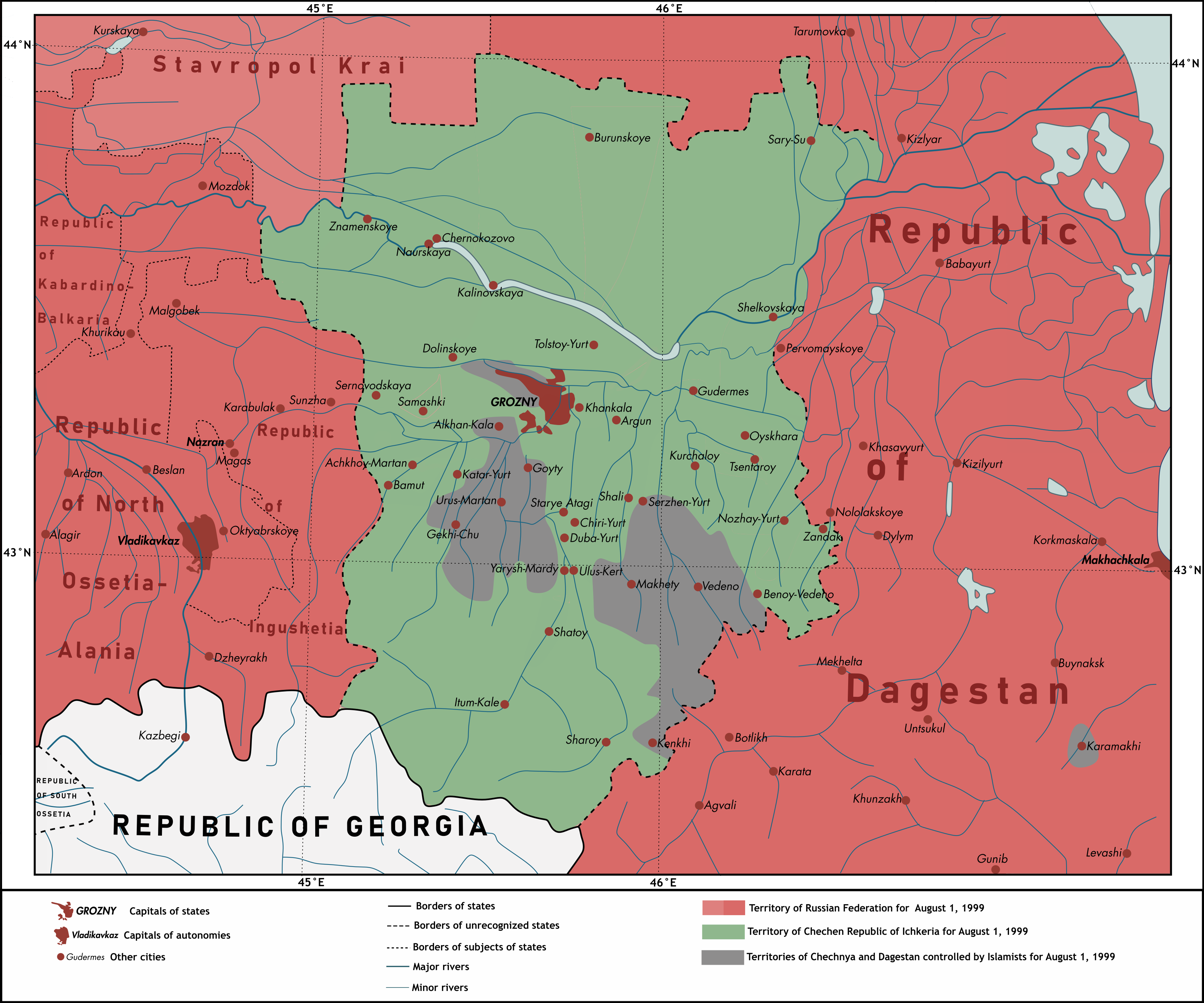
Situation in Chechnya in the period between the end of the First Chechen War and the beginning of the Second Chechen War: In red the territory under the control of the Russian Federation, in green the territory under the control of the Chechen Republic of Ichkeria, and in grey the areas under the control of the islamists.

Six months after the Khasavyurt Accord, on 12 May 1997, Chechen-elected president Maskhadov traveled to Moscow where he and Yeltsin signed a formal treaty "on peace and the principles of Russian-Chechen relations" that Maskhadov predicted would demolish "any basis to create ill-feelings between Moscow and Grozny." Maskhadov's optimism, however, proved misplaced. Little more than two years later, some of Maskhadov's former comrades-in-arms, led by field commanders Basayev and Khattab, launched an invasion of Dagestan in the summer of 1999 – and soon Russia's forces entered Chechnya again, marking the beginning of the Second Chechen War.

== Foreign policy implications ==
From the outset of the First Chechen conflict, Russian authorities struggled to reconcile new international expectations with widespread accusations of Soviet-style heaviness in their execution of the war. For example, Foreign Minister Andrei Kozyrev, who was generally regarded as a Western-leaning liberal, made the following remark when questioned about Russia's conduct during the war; "'Generally speaking, it is not only our right but our duty not to allow uncontrolled armed formations on our territory. The Foreign Ministry stands on guard over the country's territorial unity. International law says that a country not only can but must use force in such instances ... I say it was the right thing to do ... The way in which it was done is not my business." These attitudes contributed greatly to the growing doubts in the West as to whether Russia was sincere in its stated intentions to implement democratic reforms. The general disdain for Russian behavior in the Western political establishment contrasted heavily with widespread support in the Russian public. Domestic political authorities' arguments emphasizing stability and the restoration of order resonated with the public and quickly became an issue of state identity.

On 18 October 2022, Ukraine's parliament condemned the "genocide of the Chechen people" during the First and Second Chechen War.

== See also ==
- 1940–1944 insurgency in Chechnya
- Deportation of the Chechens and Ingush
- History of Chechnya
- History of Russia (1991–present)
- Islam in Russia
- Military history of the Russian Federation
- Second Chechen War – 1999–2009 war in the Caucasus region
- Circassian genocide
- List of wars involving Russia
