= Ilsur Metshin =

Tatar politician

- Ильсур Метшин
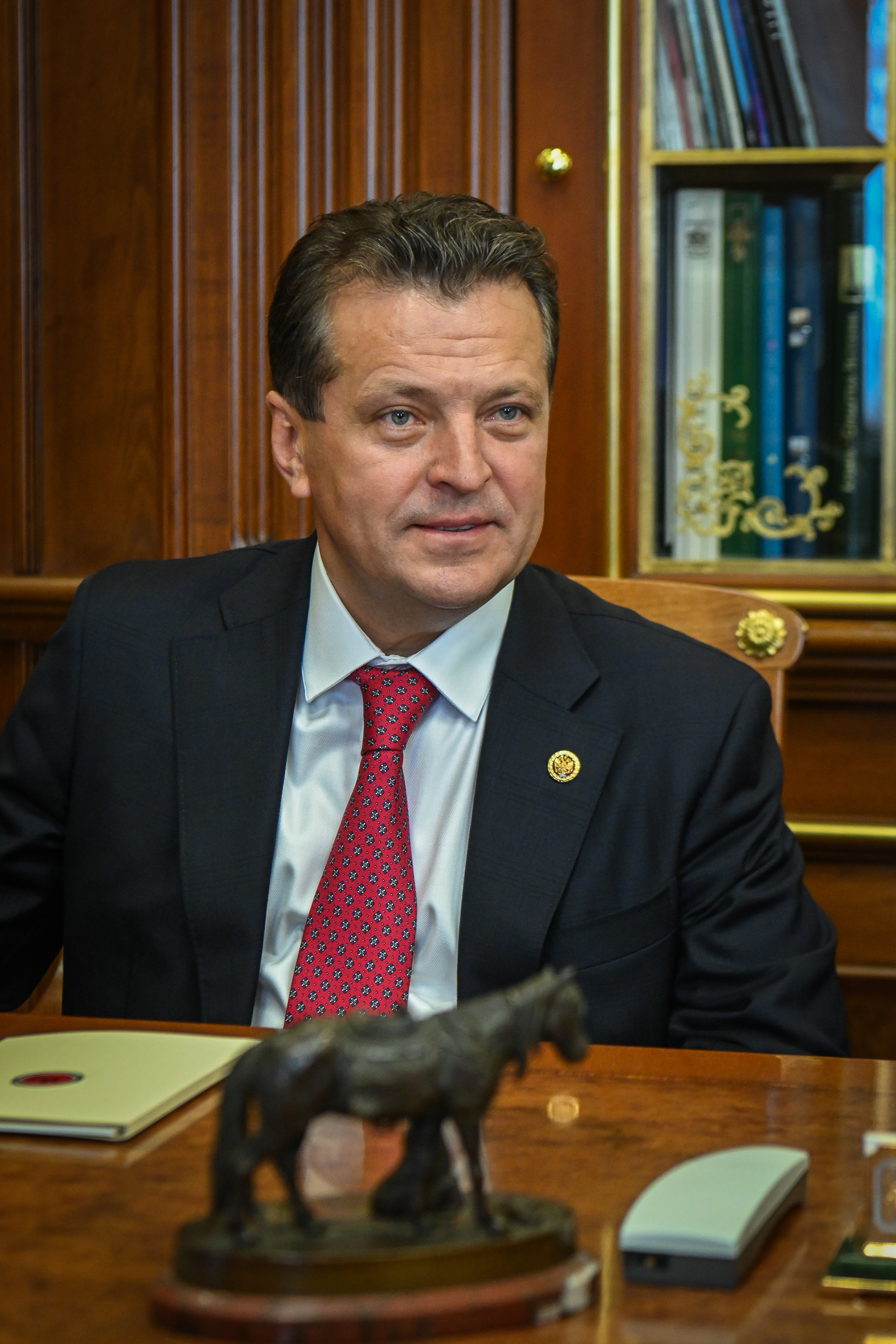
- Official portrait, 2022

47th Mayor of Kazan
- Incumbent
- Assumed office November 17, 2005
- Preceded by: Kamil Iskhakov

Member of the State Council of the Republic of Tatarstan
- In office 2000–2004

Chairman of the United Nations Advisory Committee of Local Authorities
- Incumbent
- Assumed office 2019

President of the United Cities and Local Governments
- Incumbent
- Assumed office 2021

Personal details
- Born: Ilsur Raisovich Metshin; April 24, 1969 (age 57) Nizhnekamsk, Russian SFSR, Soviet Union
- Party: United Russia
- Education: Kazan State University
- Awards: Alt text
- Website: Official website

Ilsur Raisovich Metshin (Russian: Ильсур Раисович Метшин; Tatar: Илсур Рәис улы Метшин, romanized: İlsur Räis ulı Metşin; born April 24, 1969) is a Russian politician of Tatar descent. He has served as the mayor of Kazan since 2005.

== Career ==
Ilsur Metshin was born in Nizhnekamsk in 1969.

From 1993, he worked in Kazan as a politician. From 1998, he was the mayor of Nizhnekamsk and Nizhnekamsky District and chairman of the Nizhnekamsk Council. From November 17, 2005, he was the mayor of Kazan, replacing Kamil Iskhakov. On September 4, 2015, he was selected as the new president of FC Rubin Kazan.

He was elected chairman of the United Nations Advisory Committee of Local Authorities at the UCLG World Congress 2019 in Durban. On November 17, 2021 he was elected as the governing president of the United Cities and Local Governments at the 2021 UCLG World Council in Barcelona.

Preceded by Kamil İsxaqov	Mayor of Kazan; November 17, 2005 –	Succeeded by
