= Rostekhnadzor =

Russian supervisory body

Federal Service for Environmental, Technological and Nuclear Supervision
- Федеральная служба по экологическому, технологическому и атомному надзору (Ростехнадзор)
- Agency seal

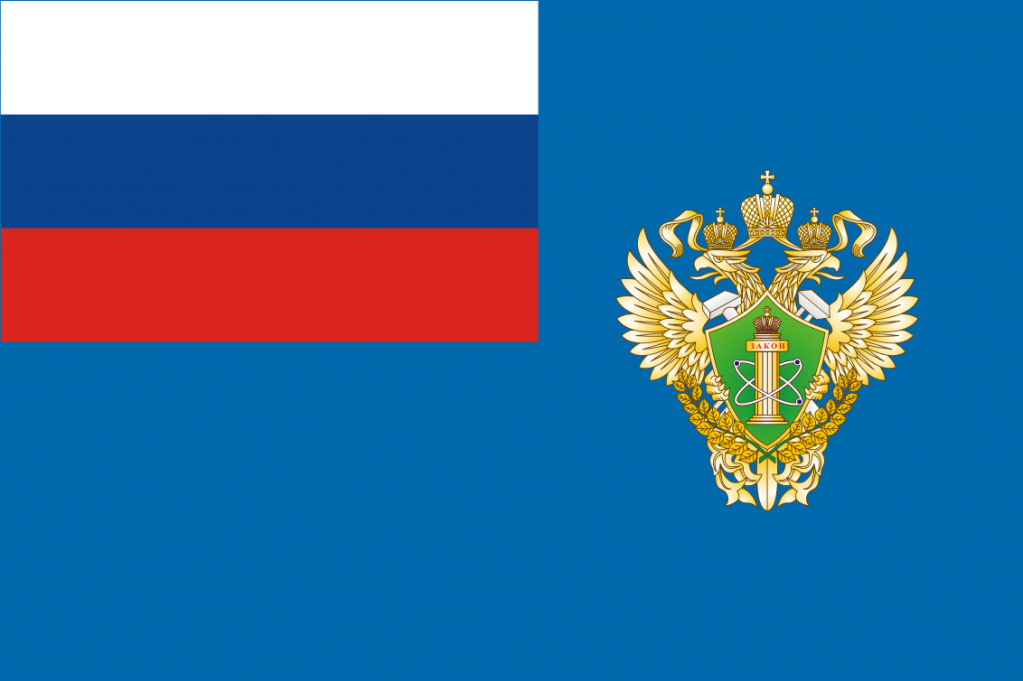
- Agency flag

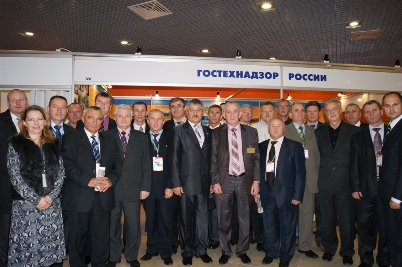
- Agency staff

Agency overview
- Formed: 9 March 2004
- Preceding agencies: Federal Atomic Oversight Service; Federal Technological Oversight Service
- Jurisdiction: Government of Russia
- Headquarters: Alexandra Lukyanova Street 4, Moscow
- Agency executive: Aleksandr Trembitsky
- Website: www.gosnadzor.ru

The Federal Service for Environmental, Technological and Nuclear Supervision (Rostekhnadzor; Russian: Федеральная служба по экологическому, технологическому и атомному надзору (Ростехнадзор)) is the supervisory body of the Government of Russia on ecological, technological, and nuclear issues. Its functions include the passage of regulatory legal acts, supervision and oversight in the field of environmental protection, limiting harmful technogenic impact (including the handling of industrial and consumer waste), safety when working with the subsoil (e.g., mining), protection of the subsoil, industrial safety, atomic energy safety (not including the development, preparation, testing, operation and use of nuclear weapons and military atomic facilities), the safety of electrical and thermal facilities and networks (except for household facilities and networks), the safety of hydraulic structures at industrial and energy sites; the safety of manufacturing, storage, and use of industrial explosives, and special state security functions in these areas.

Russian Government Resolution No. 404 of 29 May 2008 transferred Rostekhnadzor to the Ministry of Natural Resources and the Environment; previously, the service had been directly subordinate to the government. However, this was reversed by President Dmitry Medvedev on 23 June 2010, when he brought it back under the direct control of the government. In accordance with RF Government Resolution No. 54 of 1 February 2006, Rostekhnadzor was entrusted with oversight of the construction industry.

== History ==
Rostekhnadzor was created in 2004, in a merger of the Federal Atomic Oversight Service and the Federal Technological Oversight Service. Environmental oversight functions were transferred to it after the Federal Environmental and Natural Resource Oversight Service was transformed into the Federal Natural Resources Oversight Service. The combined structure was initially headed by the former director of Federal Atomic Oversight, Andrey Malyshev, who was acting director of the new service for 18 months.

From 5 December 2005 to 20 September 2008, the service was headed by Konstantin Pulikovsky, and from then until 2013 by Nikolai Kytin. The current head of Rostekhnadzor is Aleksandr Trembitsky.

== Structure ==
Since September 2009, Rostekhnadzor has consisted of a headquarters, 23 regional departments for industrial and environmental supervision in federal districts, 7 interregional departments for nuclear and radiation safety, and 4 technical support organizations. In turn, the Headquarters has 16 departments organized by function.

== Service heads ==
- Andrey Malyshev (acting) — (2004—2005)
- Konstantin Pulikovsky — (2005—2008)
- Nikolai Kytin — (2008—2013)
- Aleksey Ferapontov (acting) — (2013—2014)
- Aleksey Alyoshin — (13 January 2014 — 30 March 2021)
- Aleksandr Trembitsky — (since 30 March 2021)
