= Far Eastern Federal District =

Coordinates: 48°42′N 135°12′E

Far Eastern Federal District Дальневосточный федеральный округ
- Federal district
- The geographical location of the Far Eastern Federal District
- Interactive map of Far Eastern Federal District
- Country: Russia
- Established: 13 May 2000
- Administrative center: Vladivostok

Government
  - Presidential Envoy: Oleg Kozhemyako

Area
  - Total: 6,952,555 km^{2} (2,684,396 sq mi)
  - Rank: 1st of 8 (40.6% of the country)

Population (2021)
  - Total: 7,975,762
  - Rank: 8th of 8 (5.6% of the country)
  - Density: 1.147170/km^{2} (2.971156/sq mi)
  - Urban: 73.6%
  - Rural: 26.4%

GDP (nominal, 2024)
  - Total: ₽11.77 trillion (US$138.11 billion)
  - Per capita: ₽1.5 million (US$17,564.04)

Time zones
- Buryatia: UTC+08:00 (Irkutsk Time)
- Amur Oblast, Zabaykalsky Krai and most of the Sakha Republic (excluding districts in UTC+10:00 and UTC+11:00 time zones): UTC+09:00 (Yakutsk Time)
- Jewish Autonomous Oblast, Khabarovsk Krai, Primorsky Krai, and the Oymyakonsky, Ust-Yansky and Verkhoyansky districts of the Sakha Republic: UTC+10:00 (Vladivostok Time)
- Magadan Oblast, Sakhalin Oblast, and the Abyysky, Allaikhovsky, Momsky, Nizhnekolymsky, Srednekolymsky and Verkhnekolymsky districts of the Sakha Republic: UTC+11:00 (Magadan Time)
- Chukotka and Kamchatka Krai: UTC+12:00 (Kamchatka Time)
- Federal subjects: 11 contained
- Economic regions: 1 contained
- HDI (2022): 0.769 high · 5th
- Website: DFO.gov.ru

Far Eastern Federal District in Russia

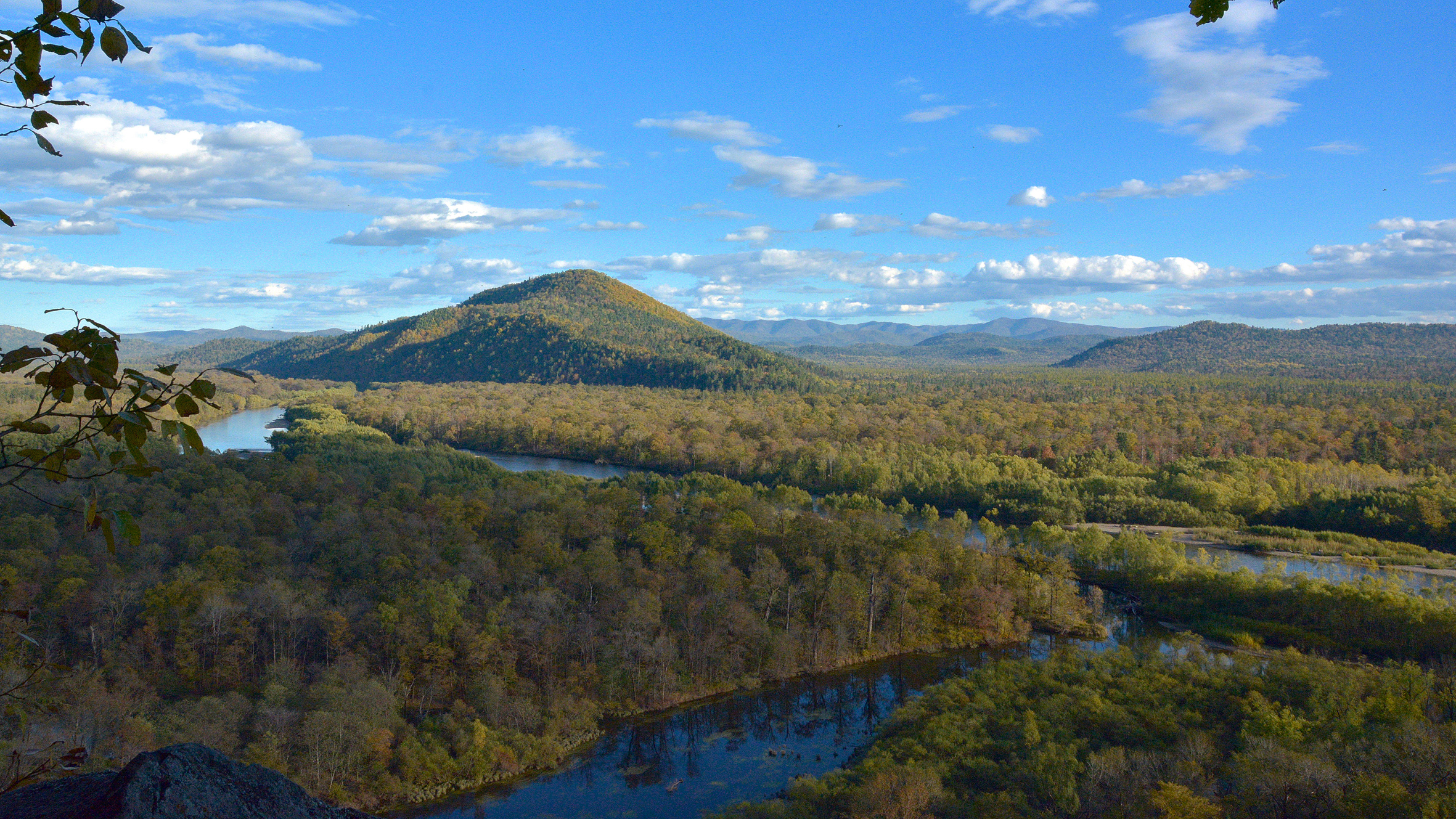
Bikin National Park, Primorsky Krai

The Far Eastern Federal District (Note: Russian: Дальневосточный федеральный округ, romanized: Dal'nevostochnyy federal'nyy okrug, IPA: [dəlʲnʲɪvɐˈstot͡ɕnɨj fʲɪdʲɪˈralʲnɨj ˈokrʊk]) is the largest and the least populated federal district of Russia, with a population of around 7.9 million and an area of 6,952,555 square kilometres (2,684,396 square miles). The federal district is within North Asia as per the UN geoscheme and it is coextensive with the Russian Far East.

== History ==
The Far Eastern Federal District was established on 13 May 2000 by President Vladimir Putin. It is currently governed by presidential envoy Yury Trutnev. In November 2018, Buryatia and Zabaykalsky Krai were added to the federal district. The seat of the Far Eastern Federal District was moved from Khabarovsk to Vladivostok in December 2018.

On 15 July 2022, the first high-speed highway was opened in the Far Eastern Federal District. It united three federal highways – Ussuri (Khabarovsk–Vladivostok), Amur (Chita–Khabarovsk) and Vostok (Khabarovsk–Nakhodka), and connected the regional capital with Komsomolsk-on-Amur, as well as sites of the territory of the advancing socio-economic development (SAD).

== Demographics ==
Population pyramid as of the 2021 Russian Census

=== Federal subjects ===

| # | Flag | Coat of arms | Federal subject | Area in km^{2} | Population (2021 census) | GDP | Capital/Administrative center | Map of Administrative Division |
|---|---|---|---|---|---|---|---|---|
| 1 | | | Amur Oblast | 361,900 | 766,912 | ₽531 billion | Blagoveshchensk | |
| 2 | | | Republic of Buryatia | 351,300 | 978,588 | ₽342 billion | Ulan-Ude | |
| 3 | | | Jewish Autonomous Oblast | 36,300 | 150,453 | ₽79 billion | Birobidzhan | |
| 4 | | | Zabaykalsky Krai | 431,900 | 1,004,125 | ₽487 billion | Chita | |
| 5 | | | Kamchatka Krai | 464,300 | 291,705 | ₽338 billion | Petropavlovsk-Kamchatsky | |
| 6 | | | Magadan Oblast | 462,500 | 136,085 | ₽315 billion | Magadan | |
| 7 | | | Primorsky Krai | 164,700 | 1,845,165 | ₽1,309 billion | Vladivostok | |
| 8 | | | Sakha Republic | 3,083,500 | 995,686 | ₽1,616 billion | Yakutsk | |
| 9 | | | Sakhalin Oblast | 87,100 | 466,609 | ₽1,234 billion | Yuzhno-Sakhalinsk | |
| 10 | | | Khabarovsk Krai | 787,600 | 1,292,944 | ₽987 billion | Khabarovsk | |
| 11 | | | Chukotka Autonomous Okrug | 721,500 | 47,490 | ₽136 billion | Anadyr | |

Historical population
| Year | Pop. | ±% |
|---|---|---|
| 1959 | 6,543,859 | — |
| 1970 | 7,737,678 | +18.2% |
| 1979 | 8,946,829 | +15.6% |
| 1989 | 10,359,773 | +15.8% |
| 2002 | 8,829,449 | −14.8% |
| 2010 | 8,372,257 | −5.2% |
| 2021 | 7,975,762 | −4.7% |
Source: Census data

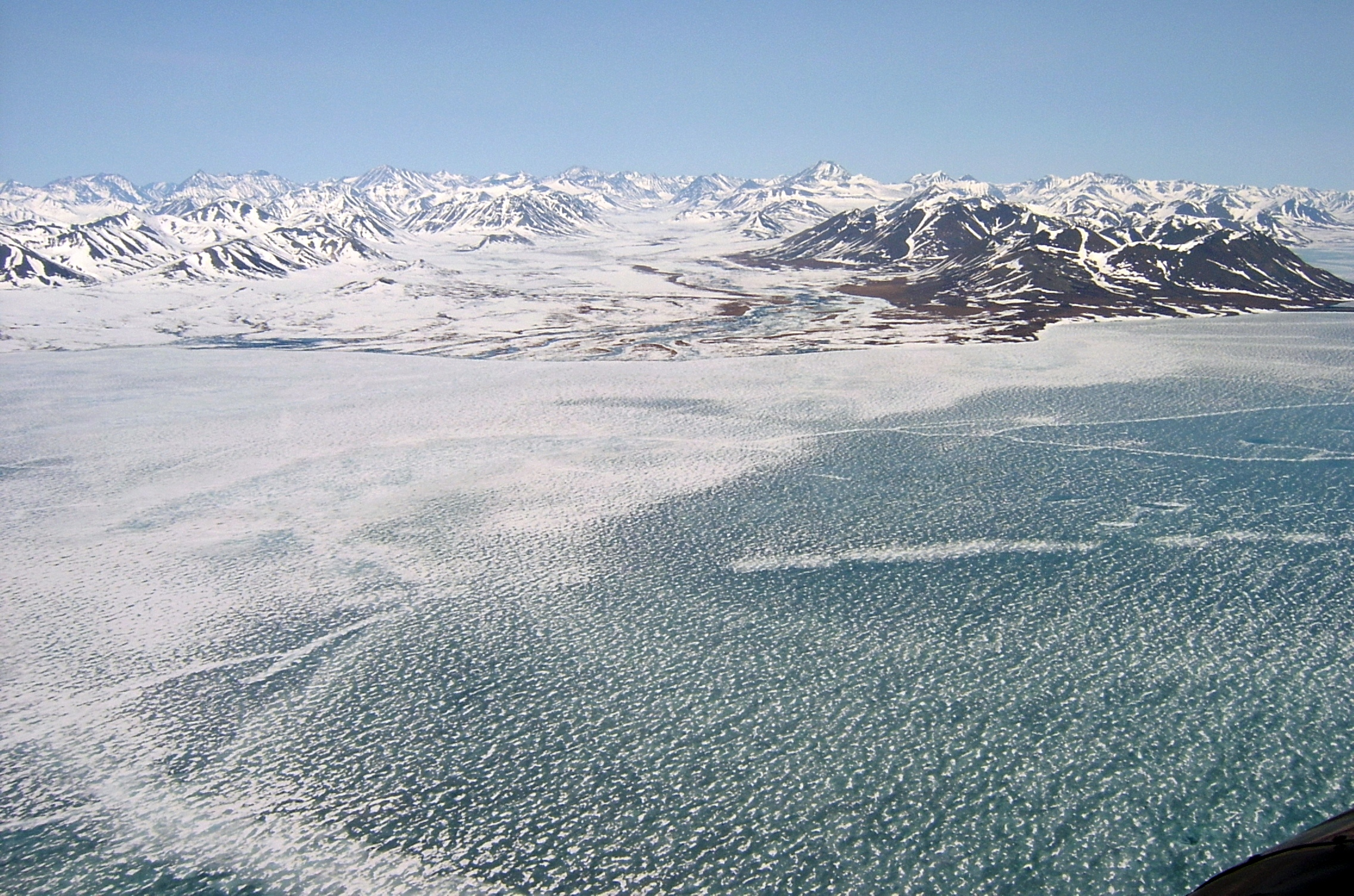
Lake Pekulney, Chukotka

=== Largest cities with a population over 75,000 ===
There are 82 cities in the Far Eastern Federal District, and 13 cities have populations over 75,000.

Only four of these 13 cities (Komsomolsk-on-Amur (7th) in Khabarovsk Krai, Ussuriysk (9th), Nakhodka (11th), Artyom (12th) in Primorsky Krai) are not administrative centres of a federal subject. Anadyr, the centre of Chukotka Autonomous Okrug, is one of the smallest centres of a federal subject (it has only 13,045 inhabitants). Only Magas, the centre of Ingushetia, is smaller than Anadyr.

Artyom is a large suburb of the Vladivostok metropolitan area.

Populations are given as of the 2021 census:

1. Khabarovsk: 617,441
2. Vladivostok: 603,519
3. Ulan-Ude: 437,565
4. Yakutsk: 355,443
5. Chita: 334,427
6. Blagoveshchensk: 241,437
7. Komsomolsk-on-Amur: 238,505
8. Yuzhno-Sakhalinsk: 181,587
9. Ussuriysk: 180,393
10. Petropavlovsk-Kamchatsky: 164,900
11. Nakhodka: 139,931
12. Artyom: 109,556
13. Magadan: 90,757

=== Religion ===
Religion in the Far Eastern Federal District as of 2012 (Sreda Arena Atlas)
| Russian Orthodoxy | 27.4% |
| Other Orthodox | 1.4% |
| Other Christians | 5.0% |
| Buddhism | 3.3% |
| Islam | 0.7% |
| Native faiths | 2.2% |
| Spiritual but not religious | 27.0% |
| Atheism and irreligion | 23.5% |
| Other and undeclared | 9.5% |

According to a 2012 survey 27.4% of the population of the current federal subjects of the Far Eastern Federal District (including Buryatia and Zabaykalsky Krai) adheres to the Russian Orthodox Church, 5.0% are unaffiliated generic Christians, 1.4% is an Orthodox believer without belonging to any church or adheres to other (non-Russian) Orthodox churches, 3.3% is an adherent of Buddhism, 0.7% is an adherent of Islam, and 2.2% adhere to some native faith such as Rodnovery, Tengrism, Yellow shamanism, or Black shamanism. In addition, 27.0% of the population declares to be "spiritual but not religious", 23.5% is atheist, and 9.5% follows other religions or did not give an answer to the question.

=== Ethnicity ===
Ethnic map of the Far Eastern Federal District by urban and rural settlements, 2010 census. This map was from before Zabaykalsky Krai and Buryatia were added to the region.

The ethnic composition, according to the 2021 census (after the integration of Buryatia and Zabaykalsky Krai in 2018) was:

- Total – 6,979,578 people
- Russians – 5,674,671 (81.30%)
- Yakuts – 472,116 (6.76%)
- Buryats – 371,677 (5.33%)
- Ukrainians – 47,560 (0.68%)
- Evenki – 33,760 (0.48%)
- Koreans – 29,855 (0.43%)
- Tatars – 24,605 (0.35%)
- Uzbeks – 23,477 (0.34%)
- Armenians – 20,185 (0.29%)
- Kyrgyz – 19,659 (0.28%)
- Evens (Lamuts) – 19,561 (0.28%)
- Tajiks – 17,812 (0.26%)
- Chukchi – 15,686 (0.22%)
- Azerbaijanis – 13,011 (0.19%)
- Nanai – 11,424 (0.16%)
- Chinese – 8,396 (0.12%)
- Belarusians – 7,944 (0.11%)
- Koryaks – 7,292 (0.10%)
- Kazakhs – 4,614 (0.07%)
- Bashkirs – 4,391 (0.06%)
- Nivkh – 3,758 (0.05%)
- Germans – 3,564 (0.05%)
- Chuvash – 2,906 (0.04%)
- Moldovans – 2,851 (0.04%)
- Mordva – 2,675 (0.04%)
- Jews – 2,529 (0.04%)
- Ulchi – 2,431 (0.03%)
- Yukaghir – 1,747 (0.03%)
- Itelmens – 1,486 (0.02%)
- Mari – 1,230 (0.02%)
- Individuals who did not indicate nationality – 996,184 (12.49%)

== Presidential plenipotentiary envoys ==
| No. | Name (envoy) | Photo | Term of office | | | Appointed by |
| No. | Name (envoy) | Photo | Start of term | End of term | Length of service | Appointed by |
|---|---|---|---|---|---|---|
| 1 | Konstantin Pulikovsky | | 18 May 2000 | 14 November 2005 | 5 years, 180 days (2,006 days) | Vladimir Putin |
| 2 | Kamil Iskhakov | | 14 November 2005 | 2 October 2007 | 1 year, 322 days (687 days) | Vladimir Putin |
| 3 | Oleg Safonov | | 30 November 2007 | 30 April 2009 | 1 year, 151 days (517 days) | Vladimir Putin |
| 4 | Viktor Ishayev | | 30 April 2009 | 30 August 2013 | 4 years, 122 days (1,583 days) | Dmitry Medvedev |
| 5 | Yury Trutnev | | 31 August 2013 | 22 October 2026 | 13 years, 52 days (4,800 days) | Vladimir Putin |
| 6 | Oleg Kozhemyako | | 22 October 2026 | present | 2 days (2 days) | Vladimir Putin |

== See also ==
- Far North (Russia)
- Far Eastern economic region
- Eastern Military District
- Far Eastern Republic
- Manchuria (Northeast China)
- Russian Manchuria
- History of Primorye
