= United Nations Advisory Committee of Local Authorities =

International committee of local government authorities

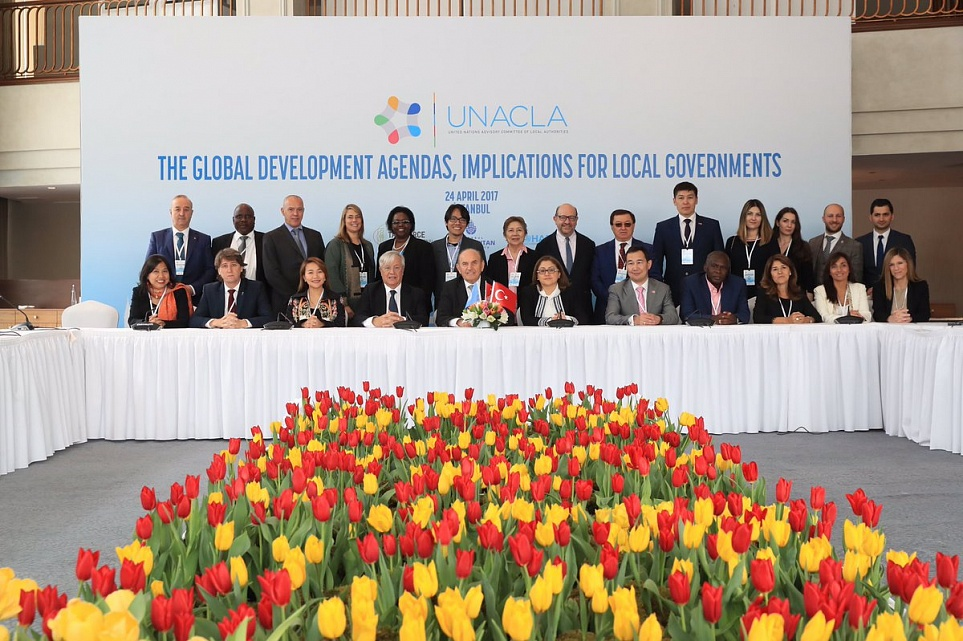
- April 2017 meeting in Istanbul
- Abbreviation: UNACLA (in English)
- Formation: 14 May 1999; 27 years ago
- Founded at: Nairobi
- Type: International advisory group
- Purpose: Strengthening the dialogue with local authorities from all over the world involved in the implementation of the Habitat Agenda
- Headquarters: Barcelona (Spain) & Nairobi (Kenya)
- Region served: Worldwide
- Fields: Sustainable Development Goals: 11: Sustainable cities and communities; 17: Partnerships for the goals
- Members: around 323 000 institutions
- Official language: English
- Chairperson: Ilsur Metshin
- Main organ: Global Taskforce of Local and Regional Governments
- Affiliations: UCLG & UN-HABITAT

United Nations Advisory Committee of Local Authorities (UNACLA) is a committee of local authorities that serves as an advisory body to United Nations System for the purpose of strengthening the dialogue with local authorities from all over the world involved in the implementation of the Habitat Agenda.

== History ==
UNACLA was established in 2000 in line with the UN Habitat Governing Council Resolution 17/18 of 1999. Since September 2004, when UN-HABITAT established a formal relationship with United Cities and Local Governments, the latter names the organization's chairperson & holds 10 of its 20 seats. UNACLA secretariat is split between Barcelona (UCLG headquarters) & Nairobi (UN-HABITAT headquarters).

== Chairs ==
Currently UNACLA is chaired by Ilsur Metshin, UCLG-Euroasia President, Mayor of Kazan (Republic of Tatarstan, Russian Federation), elected during 2019 UCLG World Summit in Durban (South Africa). He was immediately preceded in 2011-2019 by Kadir Topbaş, Mayor of Istanbul (Turkey).
