= Anatoly Romanov =

Russian Colonel General during the First Chechen War

- Born: September 27, 1948 (age 78); Mikhailovka village, Bashkir Autonomous Soviet Socialist Republic, USSR
- Military career
- Allegiance: Soviet Union; Russia
- Branch: Russian Armed Forces
- Service years: 1967–1995
- Rank: Colonel general (1995)
- Commands: Internal Troops of Russia
- Conflicts: 1993 Russian constitutional crisis First Chechen War
- Awards: Hero of the Russian Federation; Order of Military Merit; Order of the Red Star; Order "For Personal Courage"

Anatoly Alexandrovich Romanov (Russian: Анатолий Александрович Романов; born September 27, 1948) is a Russian Colonel-General, a former deputy interior minister - the commander of the Russian Interior Ministry and the Commander of the Joint Group of Federal Forces in Chechnya, Hero of the Russian Federation. In 1995 he served as Deputy Minister of Internal Affairs of the Russian Federation and the commander-in-chief of the Internal Troops of the Russian Interior Ministry.

== Assassination Attempt ==
On October 6, 1995, in Grozny in the area of a tunnel under the railway bridge, a radio-controlled bomb exploded. The car in which Romanov was riding was in the center of the explosion. Romanov was seriously injured, miraculously survived, but was left disabled (Romanov went to the meeting to Khasbulatov).

== See also ==
- List of Heroes of the Russian Federation
