= Oleg Safonov =

- Олег Сафонов
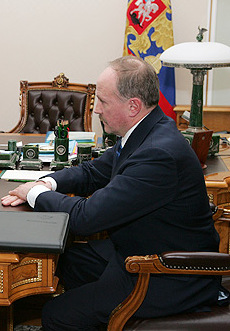
- Safonov in 2008

State Secretary - Deputy Director of the Federal Drug Control Service of the Russia
- In office 12 June 2009 – 2016
- Preceded by: Aleksandr Fyodorov
- Succeeded by: position abolished

3rd Russian Presidential Envoy to the Far Eastern Federal District
- In office 29 October 2007 – 30 April 2009
- President: Vladimir Putin; Dmitry Medvedev
- Preceded by: Kamil Iskhakov
- Succeeded by: Viktor Ishayev

Deputy Minister of Internal Affairs
- In office 14 November 2006 – 29 October 2007

Auditor of the Accounts Chamber of Russia
- In office 18 March 2005 – 7 March 2007
- Preceded by: Aleksandr Kushnar
- Succeeded by: Aleksandr Zhdankov

Personal details
- Born: Oleg Aleksandrovich Safonov; 24 August 1960 (age 65) Ulyanovsk, Russia, Soviet Union
- Party: United Russia

Oleg Aleksandrovich Safonov (Russian: Олег Александрович Сафонов, born August 24, 1960) is a Russian official. He has the federal state civilian service rank of 1st class Active State Councillor of the Russian Federation.

In 1982 he graduated from the Border Guards Higher School of the KGB in Moscow and subsequently served for the KGB until 1991. It is sometimes claimed that for some time he served in Dresden together with Vladimir Putin. In 1991-1994 he worked under Vladimir Putin in the Committee for the External Relations of the Saint Petersburg Mayor's Office to develop regulatory documentation regulating activities in the field of gambling. From November 14, 1996, to October 30, 2007, Safonov was a deputy Interior Minister of Russia, appointed by President Putin. On October 30, 2007, Vladimir Putin appointed him plenipotentiary envoy to the Far Eastern Federal District. Safonov was believed to be married to a daughter of Viktor Ivanov. However, in April 2009, an article indicated that Oleg Safonov's wife was named Lyudmila Gennadayevna. An alternate theory is that the Safonovs' daughter, Elizabeta, is married to Viktor Ivanov's son, Yaroslav.
