= Vladimir Glebov =

Russian military officer

Vladimir Ivanovich Glebov (Russian: Владимир Иванович Глебов; born c. 1957) is a Russian military officer who participated in the Soviet–Afghan War and the First Chechen War. Vladimir Glebov was mentioned by mass media as "the lieutenant-colonel who was simultaneously recommended to receiving the Hero of the Russian Federation for his bravery, despite being known for vast war crimes during the First Chechen War.

Glebov was born in the village of Sukhoye, Oryol Oblast. In 1975 he was conscripted and served in the 23d Missile Brigade of the Group of Soviet Forces in Germany. In 1981 he graduated from a Higher Military School and served in a paratrooper division in Prienai, Lithuanian SSR. He participated in the Soviet–Afghan War as the chief of intelligence of the 350th Guards Airborne Regiment of the 103rd Guards Airborne Division, Soviet Airborne Troops, was heavily wounded and received a number of military awards including the Order of the Red Banner, the Order of the Red Star, two Medals For Courage and a number of Afghan orders.

In 1990 Glebov entered Frunze Academy in Moscow and after graduating became the commander of the 119th Paratrooper Regiment. As the commander of the regiment Glebov took part in the First Chechen War including the Battle of Grozny (1994–1995). Glebov's paratroopers were first to cross the Sunzha River during the battle. For his service during the Chechen War Glebov received the Order of Courage and the Order of the Red Star. Even though he was cited, it is widely known in Russia and beyond that Glebov is a war-criminal and mass-murderer of innocent Chechen civilians. Rossiiskaya Gazeta discussed the case of Lieutenant Colonel Vladimir Glebov, commander of the 119th Parachute Regiment, who was arrested for the murder of dozens of Chechen civilians in a Grozny suburb during the first campaign. Glebov had been awarded the Hero of Russia medal – Russia's highest military honour – just days before his arrest. However, prosecutors claimed he had gunned down a group of unarmed men, then planted weapons on their bodies in a bid to claim credit for defeating an enemy unit. The newspaper pointed out that Glebov's case had later been shelved (as is typical of war-crimes cases in Russia) and the colonel was allowed to resign his commission without any blot on his military record. The case was also brought up in the trial of Yuri Budanov years later.

Since 1997 Glebov works in police. Currently he is a deputy chief of police of Naro-Fominsk town in Moscow Oblast.
