= Andrew Shumack =

American journalist

- Born: Andrew Shumack
- Disappeared: July 28, 1995 (age 25); Grozny, Chechnya
- Status: Missing for 31 years and 23 days

Andrew Shumack Jr. was an American freelance journalist and photographer from Pennsylvania who disappeared during the First Chechen War, a month after he left Saint Petersburg for Chechnya, and is presumed dead.

== Biography ==
Andrew Shumack Jr. was born in 1969 to Andrew Shumack Sr. and his wife Carol Bradley. He was the youngest of six children.

Shumack had worked for the weekly Bethlehem Star before traveling to Russia.

In a July 19 postcard he sent to his parents from Russia, Shumack wrote, "Money is tight, but things are well." A Spanish reporter called the U.S. Embassy in Moscow on August 9 to report that Shumack's knapsack was left at the press center in Grozny.

Shumack was last seen July 28, 1995, when he left Grozny and headed toward the surrounding mountainous area.

Eight days earlier, on July 20, The St. Petersburg Press, an English-language newspaper, had provided Shumack with a letter of introduction to help him obtain press credentials. In return, Shumack was to give the paper photographs and stories for three months. He had also planned to feed his photos to The Philadelphia Inquirer. It was the first time he had ventured into a war zone. Journalists in Grozny found his backpack, sleeping bag, and documents (including a copy of his passport) abandoned in his hotel.

He is believed to be dead, as no one from the newspaper has heard from him since, and U.S. Embassy officials have not been able to locate him despite repeated trips to the region.

== See also ==
- List of people who disappeared mysteriously (2000–present)
