= Zainap Gashaeva =

Chechen human rights activist (born 1953)

- Зайнап Гашаева
- Born: 1953 (age 72–73); Kazakh Soviet Socialist Republic
- Citizenship: Russia
- Occupation: Human rights activist
- Years active: 1994–present
- Known for: Documenting war crimes during the Chechen wars

Zainap Gashaeva (Russian: Зайнап Гашаева; born 1953) is a Chechen human rights activist. She is known for documenting war crimes that occurred during the Chechen wars, for which she has received several awards.

== Biography ==
Gashaeva was born in 1953 in the Kazakh Soviet Socialist Republic into a Chechen family that had been moved from Chechnya during the forced deportation of Nakh peoples from the North Caucasus to Central Asia in 1944. As a child, Gashaeva was given the nickname "Khokha", meaning "dove" in Chechen. She was not aware of what had led to her family moving to Kazakhstan beyond being told about the Khaibakh massacre, in which over 700 villagers were killed by Soviet forces in the Chechen village of Khaybakha. Gashaeva's father died when she was 12, and shortly afterwards the family returned to Grozny, the capital of Chechnya. Gashaeva studied economics at university before marrying and becoming the mother of four children, settling in Moscow, the capital of Russia.

In 1994, following the outbreak of the First Chechen War, Gashaeva returned to Grozny, where she began to photograph and record war crimes committed in Chechnya. She became a member of the Union of Women of the North Caucuses, and in 1995 co-organised a peace march from Moscow to Grozny. In 1997, Gashaeva founded the human rights group Echo of War, which searched for missing people and provided assistance to children orphaned by the war.

In 1999, after the start of the Second Chechen War, Gashaeva resumed her human rights work. During the war, she was accused by Russian authorities of having links to Chechen terrorists. In 2010, Gashaeva fled Russia, receiving asylum in Switzerland.

In 2005, Gashaeva acted as PeaceWomen Across the Globe's coordinator for Russia and Belarus, which aimed to promote the work of women peace activists.

In 2011, footage shot by Gashaeva made up over half of the material included in the Chechen Archive, a video archive created by Swiss branch of the Society for Threatened Peoples in 2011. The archive aimed to help with the investigation of war crimes from the Chechen wars that had gone unpunished. The footage had been smuggled out of Russia and taken to Bern, where they were digitised.

== Recognition ==
In 2002, Gashaeva was named as a laureate of the Swiss Foundation for Freedom and Human Rights. She received the Lev Kopelev Prize in 2005 and the Ida Somazzi Prize in 2011.

In 2005, the Swiss director Eric Bergkraut made a documentary about Gashaeva entitled Khokha: The Dove from Chechnya.
