= Kamil Iskhakov =

Soviet politician (born 1949)

- Камиль Исхаков
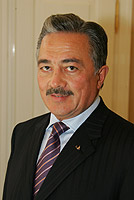

2nd Presidential Envoy to the Far Eastern Federal District
- In office 14 November 2005 – 2 October 2007
- President: Vladimir Putin
- Preceded by: Konstantin Pulikovsky
- Succeeded by: Oleg Safonov

Mayor of Kazan
- In office February 1, 1989 – November 14, 2005
- Preceded by: Revo Idiatullin
- Succeeded by: Ilsur Metshin

Personal details
- Born: 8 February 1949 (age 77) Kazan, Russia, USSR

Kamil Iskhakov, (Russian: Камиль Шамильевич Исхаков, Tatar: Камил Шамил улы Исхаков, romanized: Qämil Şamil ulı İsxakov) (born February 8, 1949) is Russian regional development minister's assistant. He has the federal state civilian service rank of 1st class Active State Councillor of the Russian Federation.

He is a graduate of Kazan Technical School and physical department Kazan State University. In the 1980s, he was the Director of the Kazan Science and Education Center and The Kazan Science and Manufacturing Association. From 1989-1991, he was the Chairman of the Kazan City Council Executive Committee. Between 1991 and 2005, Member of the Kazan City Council of Peoples Deputies, Chairman of the Kazan City Council of Peoples Deputies, Head of the Kazan City Administration. In 2005-2007 he was the Presidential Envoy to the Far East District.

== Honours and awards ==
- Order of Merit for the Fatherland;
  - 3rd class (19 July 2004) - for outstanding contribution to the implementation of socio-economic reforms in the city and many years of diligent work
  - 4th class (13 April 1999) - for outstanding contribution to the socio-economic development of the city and many years of diligent work
- Order of Honour (7 June 1996) - for services to the state, a large contribution to the construction of social and cultural facilities in the city of Kazan and many years of diligent work
- Medal "In Commemoration of the 1000th Anniversary of Kazan"
- Medal "For Valiant Labour. To commemorate the 100th anniversary of VI Lenin"
- Order of St. Sergius, 2nd class (Russian Orthodox Church, 2005)
- Laureate of the USSR Council of Ministers (1986)
- Honorary Worker Housing in Russia (1998)
- Certificate of Merit of the Republic of Tatarstan (1998)
- Honorary Citizen of Kazan (2006)

Preceded by Revo Idiatullin	Mayor of Kazan; 1991-2005	Succeeded by İlsur Metşin
Preceded by Konstantin Pulikovsky	Presidential Envoy to the Far Eastern Federal District; November 14, 2005-October 2, 2007	Succeeded by Oleg Safonov
