= Konstantin Pulikovsky =

Russian military commander and statesman

- Константин Пуликовский
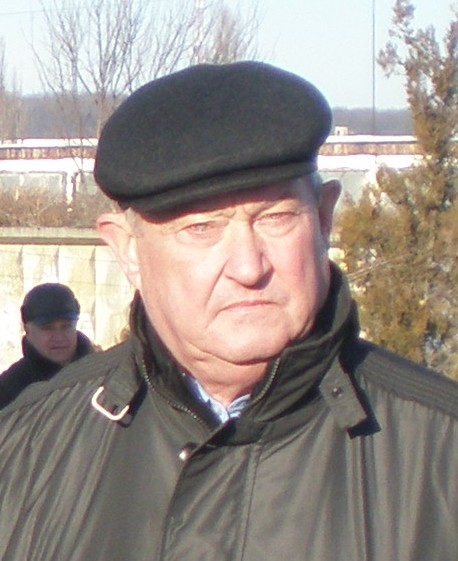
- Pulikovsky in 2014

Head of Rostekhnadzor
- In office 5 December 2005 – 2 December 2008
- Preceded by: Andrey Malyshev
- Succeeded by: Nikolay Kutin

Presidential Envoy to the Far Eastern Federal District
- In office 18 May 2000 – 14 November 2005
- President: Vladimir Putin
- Preceded by: Office established
- Succeeded by: Kamil Iskhakov

Deputy Commander of the North Caucasian Military District
- In office 1996–1997

Personal details
- Born: Konstantin Borisovich Pulikovsky; 9 February 1948 (age 78) Ussuriysk, Russian SFSR, Soviet Union
- Party: A Just Russia
- Children: Sergey Pulikovsky

Konstantin Borisovich Pulikovsky (Russian: Константин Борисович Пуликовский; born 9 February 1948), is a Russian military commander and statesman, a lieutenant general of the reserve. He was the Plenipotentiary Representative of the President of the Russian Federation in the Far Eastern Federal District from 18 May 2000 to 14 November 2005. He last served as the Head of Rostekhnadzor from 5 December 2005 to 2 September 2008. He has the federal state civilian service rank of 1st class Active State Councillor of the Russian Federation.

== Biography ==
Konstantin Pulikovsky was born on 9 February 1948.

=== Education ===
In 1970, he graduated from the Ulyanovsk Tank School.

He also graduated from the Military Academy of Armored Forces in 1982. In 1992, the Military Academy of the General Staff of the Armed Forces of Russia.

=== Labor activity ===
For 33 years, Pulikovsky served in the Soviet Ground Forces and then the Russian Ground Forces. He was a member of the Communist Party of the Soviet Union, and held command positions in units, formations, operational and operational-strategic formations of the army. He saw military service in Belarus, Turkmenistan, Estonia, Lithuania, and the Caucasus.

As a senior officer in the Russian Ground Forces after 1991, he participated in the First Chechen War. During the New Year's assault on Grozny, Pulikovsky commanded Group North (Russian "Sever"). The group included the Maikop brigade and the 81st Guards Motor Rifle "Samara" Regiment, which suffered heavy losses. From 1996 to 1997, he was the commander of the united group of federal forces in the Chechen Republic, and deputy commander of the North Caucasian Military District

From 1998 to 2008, he was assistant to the mayor of Krasnodar Valery Samoilenko, for work with municipal enterprises, head of the city improvement committee. He was the chairman of the regional branch of the public organization of veterans "Combat Brotherhood".

From 18 May 2000 to 14 November 2005, Pulikovsky served as the 1st Plenipotentiary Representative of the President of the Russian Federation in the Far Eastern Federal District, and the member of the Security Council of Russia, during which he accompanied North Korean leader Kim Jong-il in his train visit to Russia in 2001.

From 5 December 2005 to 2 September 2008, Pulikovsky was the head of the Federal Service for Environmental, Technological and Nuclear Supervision (Rostekhnadzor).

In the last years, the chairman of the council of the regional branch of the A Just Russia in the Krasnodar Krai, in 2011, according to the party's list, he ran for the State Duma deputies, without entering the federal parliament, he left the party.

== Family ==
He is married and had two sons, Aleksey, and Sergey. Aleksey was the eldest son, an officer of the Russian Armed Forces, who died during the armed conflict in the Chechen Republic on 14 December 1995 in the village of Shatoy when unblocking the 245th Motorized Rifle Regiment 's checkpoint captured by the militants. Sergey is the Deputy Head of the Krasnodar Krai focusing on domestic policy.
