= A375 Highway =

Road in Russia

Federal Highway A375
- Федеральная автомобильная дорога А375
- Vostok highway (before 2023)
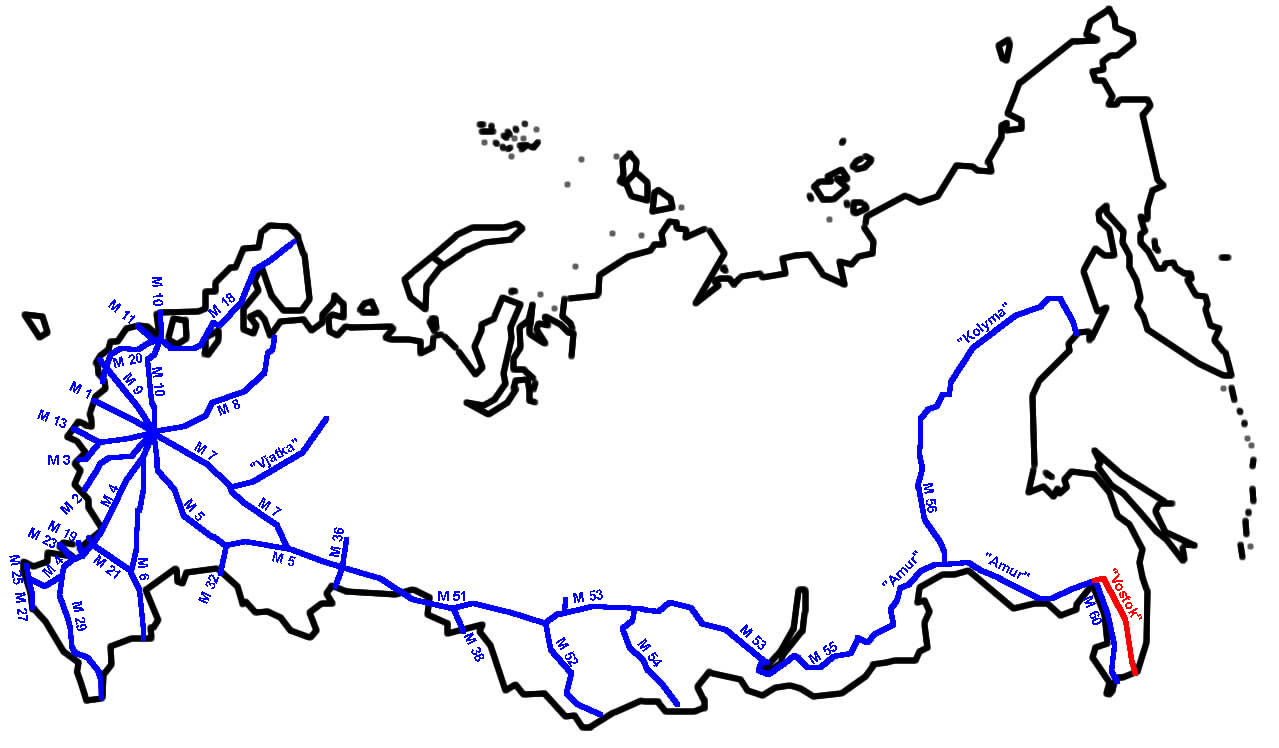

Route information
- Length: 824 km (512 mi)

Major junctions
- North end: A376 east of Khabarovsk
- South end: Nakhodka

Location
- Country: Russia

Highway system
- Russian Federal Highways
← A 371	→ A 376

"Vostok" is the easternmost branch of the Russian federal highway network

A375 Highway, formerly named as Vostok Highway (Russian: Федеральная автомобильная дорога «Восток»), is a Russian federal highway currently under construction that will run 824 km (512 mi) between Khabarovsk and Nakhodka.

The Khabarovsk Bypass highway combined three federal highways — Ussuri (Khabarovsk — Vladivostok), Amur (Chita — Khabarovsk) and Vostok (Khabarovsk — Nakhodka), the road connecting the regional capital with Komsomolsk-on-Amur, as well as the sites of the territory of advanced socio-economic development (TOP).

On 1 October 2023, Russian Federal Government decided to cancel the "Vostok" nickname for A375 highway, make it officially the name for M12 from Moscow to Tyumen, which got the Vostok name in c.2020 and parallel named for near 3 years.
