= List of people allegedly involved in the 1999 Russian apartment bombings =

The Russian apartment bombings were a series of five bombings in Russia that took place in Moscow and two other Russian towns during ten days of September 1999. Altogether nearly 300 civilians were killed at night. The bombings, together with the Dagestan War, led the country into the Second Chechen War. Chechen militants were blamed but no Chechen field commander accepted responsibility for the bombings and Chechen president Aslan Maskhadov denied any involvement of his government.

The bombings ceased when a similar bomb was found and defused in an apartment block in the Russian city of Ryazan on September 23. Later in the evening Vladimir Putin praised the vigilance of the Ryzanians and ordered the air bombing of Grozny, which marked the beginning of the Second Chechen War. A few hours later, three FSB agents who had planted the bomb were caught by the local police. This incident was declared to be a training exercise by FSB director Nikolai Patrushev.

Russian Parliament member Yuri Shchekochikhin filed two motions for a parliamentary investigation of the events, but the motions were rejected by the Russian Duma in March 2000. An independent public commission to investigate the bombings chaired by Duma deputy Sergei Kovalev was hampered by government refusal to respond to its inquiries, and its chairmen admitted that he has no evidence to support any version of the events. Two key members of the Kovalev Commission, Sergei Yushenkov and Yuri Shchekochikhin, both Duma members, have since died in apparent assassinations. The Commission's lawyer Mikhail Trepashkin was arrested.

A number of people were convicted or accused of involvement in the bombings.

== Official suspects ==
According to official investigation, the following people either delivered explosives, stored them, or harbored other suspects:

Arab-born Mujahid Ibn al-Khattab who was killed by the FSB in 2002.

=== Moscow bombings ===
- Achemez Gochiyayev (An ethnic Karachai, has not been arrested; he is still at large if alive)
- Denis Saitakov (An ethnic Tatar from Uzbekistan, killed in Georgia in 1999–2000)
- Khakim Abayev (An ethnic Karachai, killed by FSB special forces in May 2004 in Ingushetia)
- Ravil Akhmyarov (Russian citizen, Surname indicates an ethnic Tatar, killed in Chechnya in 1999–2000)
- Yusuf Krymshamkhalov (Ethnic Karachai and Resident of Kislovodsk, arrested in Georgia in December 2002, extradited to Russia and sentenced to life imprisonment in January 2004, after a two-month secret trial held without a jury)
- Stanislav Lyubichev (A traffic police inspector, Resident of Kislovodsk, Stavropol Krai, who helped the truck with explosives pass the checkpoint after getting a sack of sugar as a bribe, sentenced to 4 years in May 2003)

=== Volgodonsk bombing ===
- Timur Batchayev (Ethnic Karachai, killed in Georgia in the clash with police during which Krymshakhalov was arrested)
- Zaur Batchayev (Ethnic Karachai killed in Chechnya in 1999–2000)
- Adam Dekkushev (Ethnic Karachai, arrested in Georgia, threw a grenade at police during the arrest, extradited to Russia and sentenced to life imprisonment in January 2004, after a two-month closed trial held without a jury)

=== Buinaksk bombing ===
- Isa Zainutdinov (Ethnic Avar and native of Dagestan, sentenced to life imprisonment in March 2001)
- Alisultan Salikhov (Ethnic Avar and native of Dagestan, sentenced to life imprisonment in March 2001)
- Magomed Salikhov (Ethnic Avar and native of Dagestan, arrested in Azerbaijan in November 2004, extradited to Russia, found not guilty on the charge of terrorism by the jury on January 24, 2006; found guilty of participating in an illegal armed force and illegal crossing of the national border,; he was retried second time, and on November 13, 2006, found again not guilty, this time on all charges, including the ones he was found guilty of in the first trial. According to Kommersant Salikhov admitted that he made a delivery of paint for terrorist Ibn al-Khattab, although he did not check if that really was a paint.)
- Ziyavudin Ziyavudinov (Native of Dagestan, arrested in Kazakhstan, extradited to Russia, sentenced to 24 years in April 2002)
- Abdulkadyr Abdulkadyrov (Ethnic Avar and native of Dagestan, sentenced to 9 years in March 2001)
- Magomed Magomedov (Sentenced to 9 years in March 2001)
- Zainutdin Zainutdinov (Ethnic Avar and native of Dagestan, sentenced to 3 years in March 2001 and immediately released under amnesty)
- Makhach Abdulsamedov (Native of Dagestan, sentenced to 3 years in March 2001 and immediately released under amnesty).

== FSB and GRU suspects ==
The suspicious events led to allegations that the bombings were in fact a "false flag" attack perpetrated by the FSB in order to legitimize the resumption of military activities in Chechnya and bring Vladimir Putin and the FSB to power. This theory is promoted in books by David Satter, Yuri Felshtinsky and Vladimir Pribylovsky. It was also supported by Alexander Litvinenko and Anna Politkovskaya, who were assassinated. According to them, the following suspects have been involved:

- Future Russian president Vladimir Putin who was leading the chain of command according to the book by Felshinsky and Pribylovsky.
- Director of Russian FSB agency Nikolai Patrushev
- FSB General German Ugryumov who allegedly supervised the attacks. At the time, he was one of the lead figures in the FSB's counterterrorism section.
- Maxim Lazovsky, an FSB officer who was also involved in staging of bombings in Moscow in 1994.
- Yusuf Krymshamkhalov and Adam Dekkushev, two official convicts who were hired by FSB agents provocateurs and who organized transportation of explosives to Moscow according to both versions
- FSB officers Vladimir Romanovich and Ramazan Dyshenkov who carried out the apartment bombings in Moscow according to this version
- Three FSB agents (two men and a woman) who conducted the "training exercise" in the city of Ryazan. Their identities and fate remains unknown although their photos were shown on Russian television.

Aleksey Galkin, a GRU officer, was captured and tortured by Chechen separatists in 1999. In a video statement the captors coerced him to make, he said that a team of twelve GRU operatives conducted bombings in the city of Buynaksk under general command of Lieutenant General Nikolai Kostechko.
