= Terrorism in Russia =

Terrorism in Russia has a long history starting from the time of the Russian Empire. Terrorism, in the modern sense, means violence against civilians to achieve political or ideological objectives by creating extreme fear.

Terrorism was an important tool used by revolutionaries in the early 20th century to disrupt the social, political, and economic system and enable rebels to bring down the Tsarist government of the Russian Empire.

Starting from the end of the 20th century, significant terrorist activity has taken place in Russia, most notably the Budyonnovsk hospital hostage crisis, the 1999 apartment bombings, the Moscow theater hostage crisis, the Beslan school siege, and most recently the Crocus City Hall attack and the 2024 Dagestan attacks. Many more acts of terrorism have been committed in major Russian cities, as well as the regions of Chechnya and Dagestan.

== 19th century ==
German Social Democrat Karl Kautsky traces the origins of terrorism, including the terrorism seen in the Russian Empire, to the "Reign of Terror" of the French Revolution. Others emphasize the role of Russian revolutionary movements during the 19th century, especially Narodnaya Volya ("People's Will") and the Nihilist movement, which included several thousand followers. "People's Will" organized one of the first political terrorism campaigns in history. In March 1881, it assassinated the Emperor of Russia Alexander II, who twenty years earlier had emancipated the Russian serfs.

Important ideologists of these groups were Mikhail Bakunin and Sergey Nechayev, who was described in Fyodor Dostoevsky's novel The Possessed. Nechayev argued that the purpose of revolutionary terror is not to gain the support of the masses, but on the contrary, to inflict misery and fear on the common population. According to Nechayev, a revolutionary must terrorize civilians in order to incite rebellions. He wrote:

"A revolutionary must infiltrate all social formations including the police. He must exploit rich and influential people, subordinating them to himself. He must aggravate the miseries of the common people, so as to exhaust their patience and incite them to rebel. And, finally, he must ally himself with the savage word of the violent criminal, the only true revolutionary in Russia".

"The Revolutionist is a doomed man. He has no private interests, no affairs, sentiments, ties, property nor even a name of his own. His entire being is devoured by one purpose, one thought, one passion – the revolution. Heart and soul, not merely by word but by deed, he has severed every link with the social order and with the entire civilized world; with the laws, good manners, conventions, and morality of that world. He is its merciless enemy and continues to inhabit it with only one purpose – to destroy it."

According to historian and writer Edvard Radzinsky, Nechayev's ideas and tactics were widely used by Joseph Stalin and other Russian revolutionaries.

== Early 20th century ==
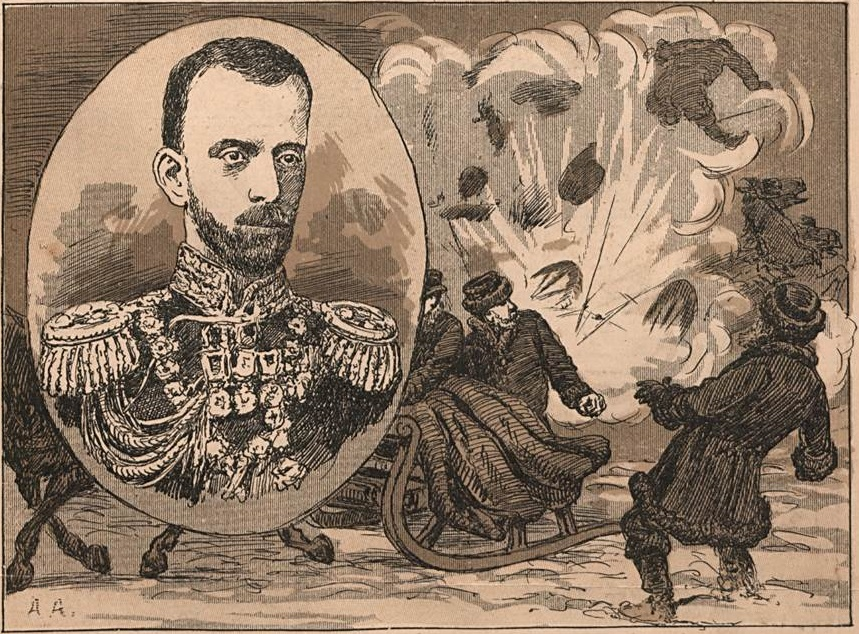
Assassination of Grand Duke Sergei Aleksandrovich in 1905

The SR Combat Organization was founded in 1902 and operated as an autonomous branch of the Socialist Revolutionary Party responsible for assassinating government officials, was led by Grigory Gershuni and operated separately from the party so as not to jeopardize its political actions. SRCO agents assassinated two Ministers of the Interior, Dmitry Sipyagin and V. K. von Plehve, Grand Duke Sergei Aleksandrovich, the Governor of Ufa N. M. Bogdanovich, and many other high-ranking officials. It has been estimated that all together in the last twenty years of the Tsarist regime (1897–1917) more than 17,000 people were killed or wounded in terror attacks.

== Soviet Union ==
=== 1977 Moscow bombings ===
A series of three bombings in Moscow on 8 January 1977 killed seven people and seriously injured 37 others. No one claimed responsibility for the bombings, although three members of an Armenian nationalist organization were executed early in 1979 after a KGB investigation and a secret trial. Some Soviet dissidents said that the bombings were allegedly organized by KGB to frame-up Armenian nationalists who were executed.

=== State-sponsored international terrorism ===
The Soviet Union and some of its allies had sponsored international terrorism on numerous occasions, especially during the Cold War.

== Russian Federation ==
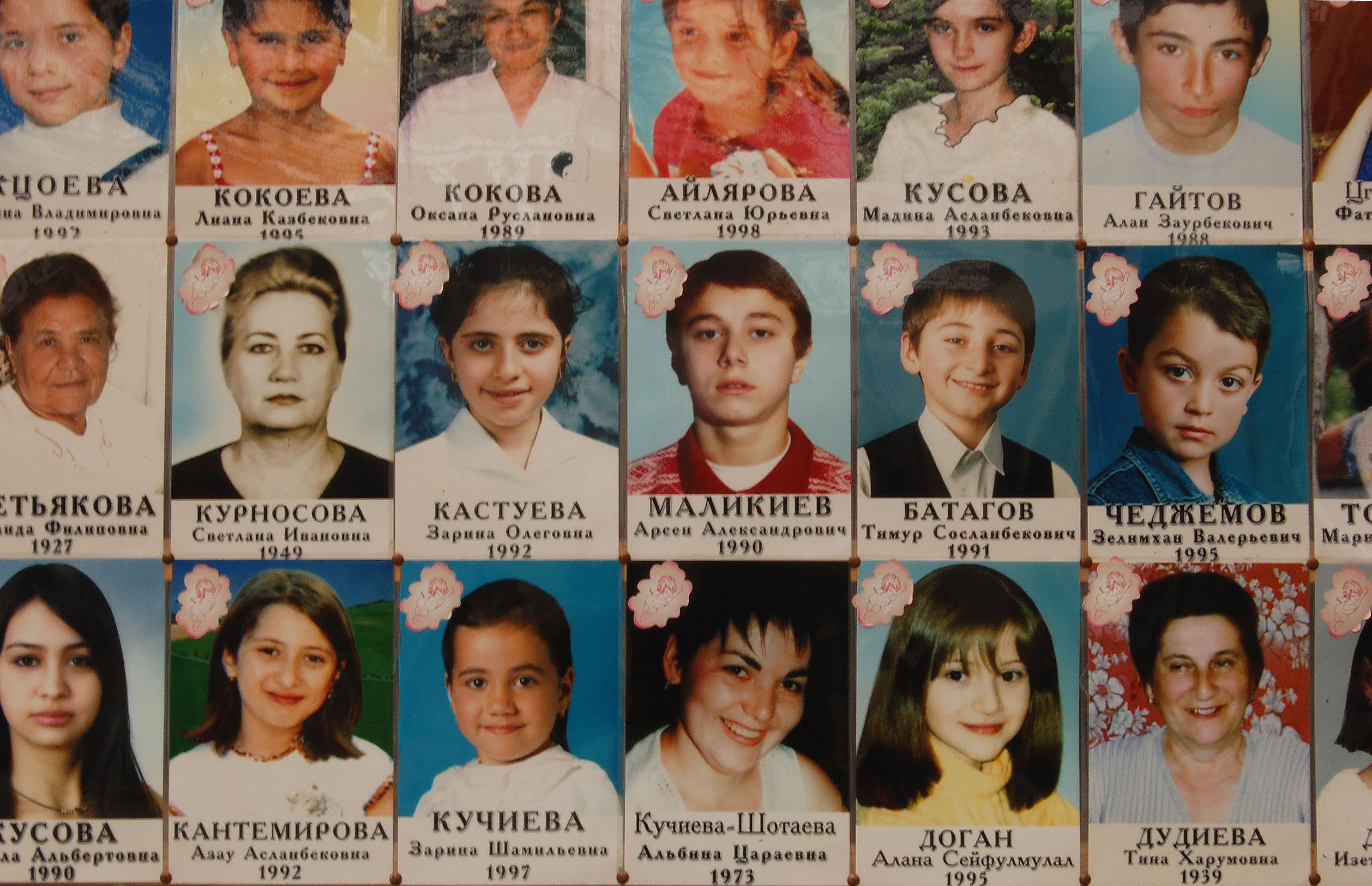
Photos of killed hostages in the gym of school # 1 in Beslan

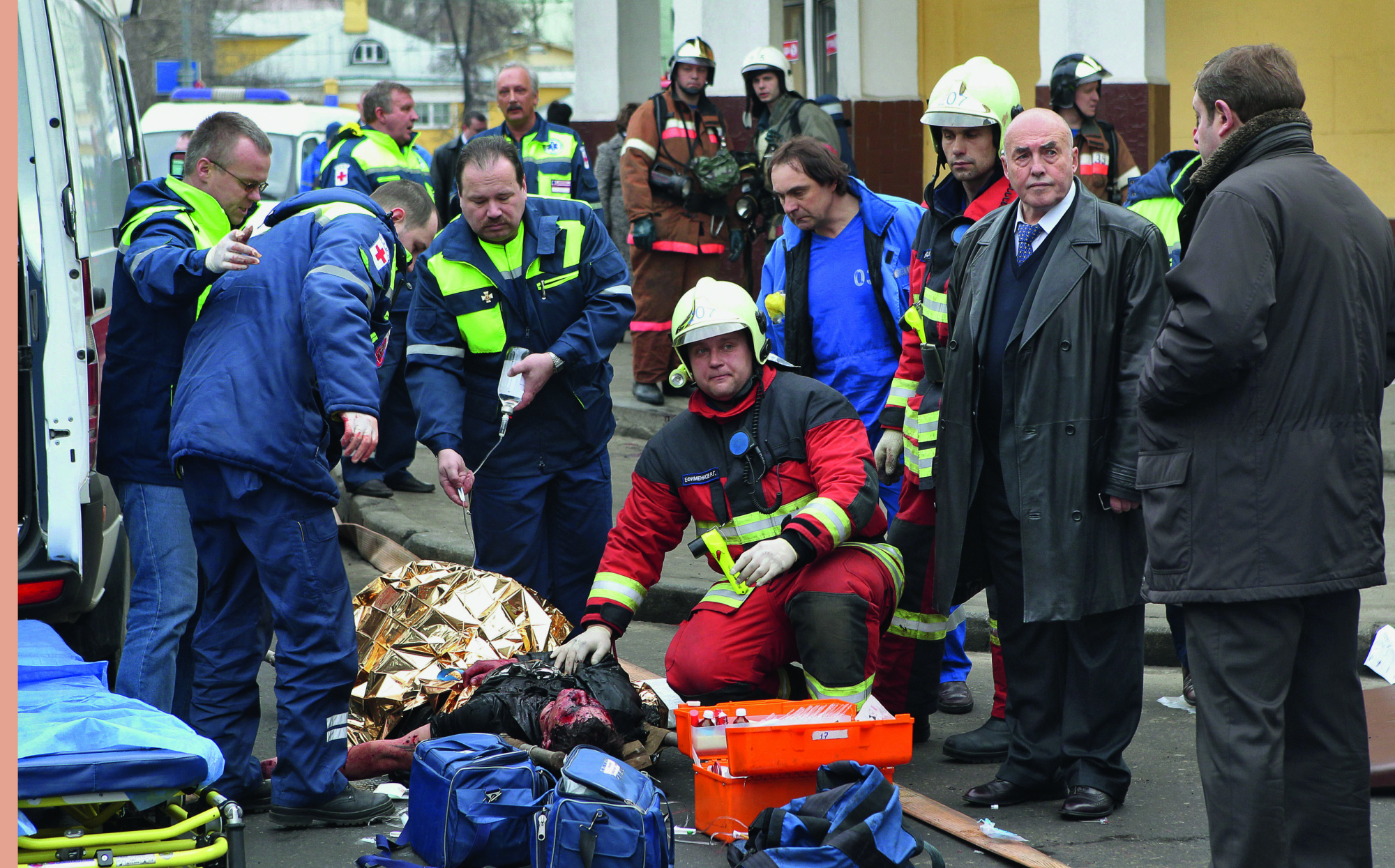
A victim of 2010 Moscow metro bombing

The First Chechen War (1994–1996) and the Second Chechen War (2000–2009) saw Chechen nationalism transformed into jihadism. In later years, the conflict extended beyond Chechnya, inspiring jihadist movements in Dagestan and Ingushetia. Since the First Chechen war, there has been a number of attacks by jihadists in various Russian cities, with the Doubrovka Theatre hostage crisis in Moscow (over 150 dead, including 130 hostages, in 2002) and the Beslan school siege in North Ossetia (334 dead, including 186 children, in 2004) peaking. There have been numerous other bloody jihadist terrorist attacks, notably at airports and in the Moscow and St Petersburg metros, with dozens of deaths.

=== 1999 Russian apartment bombings ===
The Russian apartment bombings were a series of bombings in Russia that killed 300 & injured over 1,700. And, together with the Dagestan War, led the country into the Second Chechen War. The four bombings took place in the Russian cities of Buinaksk, Moscow and Volgodonsk during early days of September 1999.

The bombings were followed by a controversial episode when a suspected bomb was found and defused in an apartment block in the Russian city of Ryazan on 22 September, which was then explained to be an exercise by the Russian security services, the FSB.

An official investigation of the bombings was completed only three years later, in 2002. Seven suspects were killed, six have been convicted on terrorism-related charges, and one remains a fugitive. According to the investigation, the Moscow and Volgodonsk bombings were organized and led by Achemez Gochiyaev, who headed a group of "Karachai Wahhabis", while the Buinaksk bombing was organized and perpetrated by a different group of "Dagestani Wahhabis".

The Russian Duma rejected two motions for parliamentary investigation of the Ryazan incident. An independent public commission to investigate the bombings chaired by Duma deputy Sergei Kovalev was rendered ineffective because of government refusal to respond to its inquiries. Two key members of the Kovalev Commission, Sergei Yushenkov and Yuri Shchekochikhin, both Duma members, have since died in assassinations in April 2003 and July 2003 respectively. The commission's lawyer Mikhail Trepashkin was arrested in October 2003 to become one of the better-known political prisoners in Russia.

=== 21st century ===
2002

The Moscow theater hostage crisis (also known as the 2002 Nord-Ost siege) was the seizure of a crowded Dubrovka Theater by 40 to 50 armed Chechens on 23 October 2002 that involved 850 hostages and ended with the deaths of at least 170 people.

2004

A suicide bombing in downtown Moscow Metro killed 41 people on 6 February.

Simultaneous suicide bombings brought down two passenger aircraft within one hour of leaving from the Domedodovo airport, Moscow, killing 90 people total on 24 August.

Chechen terrorists seized over 1,000 hostages at a school in Beslan, North Ossetia on 1 September. The siege ended on 3 September, with more than 300 people dead, most of them children.

2006

The 2006 Moscow market bombing occurred on 21 August 2006, when a self-made bomb with the power of more than 1 kg of TNT exploded at Moscow's Cherkizovsky Market frequented by foreign merchants. The bombing killed 13 people and injured 47. In 2008, eight members of the neo-Nazi organization The Saviour were sentenced for their roles in the attack.

==== 2010 ====
In March 2010 suicide bombings were carried out by two women who were aligned with Caucasus Emirate and Al-Qaeda. The terrorist attack happened during the morning rush hour of 29 March 2010, at two stations of the Moscow Metro (Lubyanka and Park Kultury), with roughly 40 minutes interval between. At least 38 people were killed, and over 60 injured.

==== 2011 ====
The Domodedovo International Airport bombing was a suicide bombing in the international arrival hall of Moscow's Domodedovo International, in Domodedovsky District, Moscow Oblast, on 24 January 2011.

The bombing killed 37 people and injured 173 others, including 86 who had to be hospitalised. Of the casualties, 31 died at the scene, three later in hospitals, one en route to a hospital, one on 2 February after having been put in a coma, and another on 24 February after being hospitalised in grave condition.

Russia's Federal Investigative Committee later identified the suicide bomber as a 20-year-old from the North Caucasus, and said that the attack was aimed "first and foremost" at foreign citizens.

==== 2013 ====
In December 2013, two separate suicide bombings a day apart targeted mass transportation in the city of Volgograd, in the Volgograd Oblast of Southern Russia, killing 34 people overall, including both perpetrators who were aligned to Caucasus Emirate and Vilayat Dagestan. The attacks followed a bus bombing carried out in the same city two months earlier.

On 21 October 2013, a suicide bombing took place on a bus in the city of Volgograd, in the Volgograd Oblast of Southern Russia. The attack was carried out by a female perpetrator named Naida Sirazhudinovna Asiyalova (Russian: Наида Сиражудиновна Асиялова) who was converted to Islam by her husband, she detonated an explosive belt containing 500–600 grams of TNT inside a bus carrying approximately 50 people, killing seven civilians and injuring at least 36 others.

==== 2014 ====
On 5 October 2014 a 19-year-old man named Opti Mudarov went to the town hall where an event was taking place to mark Grozny City Day celebrations in Grozny coinciding with the birthday of Chechen President Ramzan Kadyrov. Police officers noticed him acting strangely and stopped him. The officers began to search him and the bomb which Mudarov had been carrying exploded. Five officers, along with the suicide bomber, were killed, while 12 others were wounded.

On 4 December 2014, a group of Islamist militants, in three vehicles, killed three traffic policemen, after the latter had attempted to stop them at a checkpoint in the outskirts of Grozny. The militants then occupied a press building and an abandoned school, located in the center of the city. Launching a counter-terrorism operation, security forces, with the use of armored vehicles, attempted to storm the buildings and a firefight ensued.

14 policemen, 11 militants and 1 civilian were killed. Additionally 36 policemen were wounded in the incident. The Press House was also burned and severely damaged in the incident.

==== 2015 ====
Metrojet Flight 9268 was an international chartered passenger flight operated by Russian airline Kogalymavia (branded as Metrojet). On 31 October 2015 at 06:13 local time EST (04:13 UTC), an Airbus A321-231 operating the flight disintegrated above the northern Sinai following its departure from Sharm El Sheikh International Airport, Egypt, in route to Pulkovo Airport, Saint Petersburg, Russia. All 217 passengers and seven crew members who were on board were killed.

Shortly after the crash, the Islamic State of Iraq and the Levant (ISIL)'s Sinai Branch, previously known as Ansar Bait al-Maqdis, claimed responsibility for the incident, which occurred in the vicinity of the Sinai insurgency. ISIL claimed responsibility on Twitter, on video, and in a statement by Abu Osama al-Masri, the leader of the group's Sinai branch. ISIL posted pictures of what it said was the bomb in Dabiq, its online magazine.

By 4 November 2015, British and American authorities suspected that a bomb was responsible for the crash. On 8 November 2015, an anonymous member of the Egyptian investigation team said the investigators were "90 percent sure" that the jet was brought down by a bomb. Lead investigator Ayman al-Muqaddam said that other possible causes of the crash included a fuel explosion, metal fatigue, and lithium batteries overheating. The Russian Federal Security Service announced on 17 November that they were sure that it was a terrorist attack, caused by an improvised bomb containing the equivalent of up to 1 kilogram (2.2 lb) of TNT that detonated during the flight. The Russians said they had found explosive residue as evidence. On 24 February 2016, Egyptian President Abdel Fattah el-Sisi acknowledged that terrorism caused the crash.

==== 2017 ====
- On 3 April 2017, a terrorist attack using an explosive device took place on the Saint Petersburg Metro between Sennaya Ploshchad and Tekhnologichesky Institut stations. Seven people (including the perpetrator) were initially reported to have died, and eight more died later from their injuries, bringing the total to 15. At least 45 others were injured in the incident. The explosive device was contained in a briefcase. A second explosive device was found and defused at Ploshchad Vosstaniya metro station. The suspected perpetrator was named as Akbarzhon Jalilov, a Russian citizen who was an ethnic Uzbek born in Kyrgyzstan. Prior to the attack, Chechen separatists had been responsible for several terrorist attacks in Russia. In 2016, ISIS had plotted to target St. Petersburg due to Russia's military involvement in Syria, resulting in arrests. No public transport system in Russia had been bombed since the 2010 Moscow Metro bombings. ISIS propaganda was being circulated prior to this incident. It encouraged supporters to launch strikes on Moscow. ISIS propaganda showed bullet holes through Putin's head and a poster circulated before the attack of a falling Kremlin and included the message "We Will Burn Russia."
- On 22 April 2017, two people were shot and killed in an attack in a Federal Security Service office in the Russian city of Khabarovsk. The gunman was also killed. The Russian Federal Security Service said that the native 18-year-old perpetrator was a known member of a neo-Nazi group.
- On 27 December 2017 a bomb exploded in a supermarket in St Petersburg, injuring thirteen people. Vladimir Putin described this as a terrorist attack.

==== 2019 ====
Several terrorist incidents occurred in Russia during the year of 2019:

- On 13 March, two perpetrators attacked Federal Security Service (FSB) officers with automatic weapons and grenades when stopped for questioning in Stavropol of the Shpakovsky district. Both perpetrators were killed in the confrontation. Later, Russian authorities reported they were planning a terrorist attack in accordance to their affiliation with ISIS.
- On 8 April, ISIS (claimed to have) set off an explosion at Kolomna, a city near Moscow. The attack did not result in any casualties.
- On 1 July, ISIS claimed responsibility for an attack on a police officer at a checkpoint in the Achkhoy-Martonovsky district of Chechnya, who was stabbed to death. The attacker was shot and killed as he threw a grenade at the other officers.
- On 19 December, someone living in the Moscow Oblast opened fire near the FSB headquarters in Moscow and caused 6 casualties; 2 killed and 4 wounded. Subsequently, the shooter, later identified as Yevgeny Manyurov, a 39-year-old ex-security guard, was killed onsite.

==== 2021 ====
A German court sentenced Russian agent Vadim Krasikov to life imprisonment for the murder of Zelimkhan Khangoshvili which the judge called "state terrorism".

==== 2022 ====
On August 20, 2022, a car bomb was detonated outside Moscow, killing Russian journalist Darya Dugina, who is also the daughter of far-right philosopher Aleksandr Dugin. The FSB claims the attack was an act of terrorism involving Ukraine, with the suspect fleeing to Estonia. Reports of United States intelligence suspects Ukraine of being behind the attack.The Ukrainian government denied any involvement, with Ukrainian presidential advisor Mykhailo Podolyak stating that "we are not a criminal state like the Russian Federation, much less a terrorist one".

==== 2023 ====
On 2 April, there was an explosion in a Saint Petersburg café which killed Russian blogger, Vladlen Tatarsky and injured 42 others.

==== 2024 ====
On 22 March, a group of four gunmen from IS-KP, also known as ISIS–K, opened fire on the public and then set fire to the Crocus City Hall music venue in Krasnogorsk, a city on the Western edge of Moscow. ISIS has claimed responsibility for the attack.

On 23 June 2024, Telegram channel Baza reported a terrorist attack in the city of Derbent on the Orthodox Church of the Intercession of the Holy Virgin on Lenin Street. Not long after, a similar attack occurred in the regional capital Makhachkala. The Head of the Republic of Dagestan, Sergei Melikov, confirmed that the attacks had indeed took place.

==== 2025 ====
On 5 May, Armed militants in Makhachkala, Dagestan engaged in a firefight with local police. Three Russian police officers were killed, several other civilians and security personnel were wounded, and some militants escaped. No formal claim of responsibility was made, and identities/affiliations (including terrorism links) remain unclear.

==== 2026 ====
On 24 February, two people were killed, including the suspect, and two others were injured in a suicide bombing near the Savyolovsky railway station in Moscow, Russia.

On 1 August, 5 people were killed and 19 were injured after a bomb exploded at a large banquet at the Balzi Rossi Italian restaurant-café. It is a suspected assassination attempt on one or more Russian military officials following a series of bombings. No responsibility has been claimed.

=== Accusations of state terrorism ===
Since the dissolution of the Soviet Union in 1991, the government of the Russian Federation has been frequently accused of sponsoring or inspiring terrorist activities inside the country and in other countries in order to achieve its political goals.

Former FSB officer Alexander Litvinenko, Johns Hopkins University and Hoover Institute scholar David Satter, Russian lawmaker Sergei Yushenkov, historian Yuri Felshtinsky, politologist Vladimir Pribylovsky and former KGB general Oleg Kalugin asserted that Russian apartment bombings were in fact a "false flag" attack perpetrated by the FSB (successor to the KGB) in order to legitimize the resumption of military activities in Chechnya and bring Vladimir Putin and the FSB to power. FSB operatives were actually briefly arrested in the case, but their presence at the crime scene was explained as "training". This view was disputed by philosopher Robert Bruce Ware and Richard Sakwa, but supported by historians Amy Knight and Karen Dawisha

Aleksander Litvinenko and investigator Mikhail Trepashkin alleged that a Chechen FSB agent directed the Moscow theater hostage crisis in 2002.

In May 2016, Reuters published a Special Report titled "How Russia allowed homegrown radicals to go and fight in Syria" that, based on first-hand evidence, said that at least in the period between 2012 and 2014 the Russian government agencies ran a programme to facilitate and encourage Russian radicals and militants to leave Russia and go to Turkey and then on to Syria; the persons in question had joined jihadist groups, some fighting with the ISIL. According to the report, the goal has been to eradicate the risk of Islamic terrorism at home; however Russian security officials deny that terrorists were encouraged to leave Russia.

== Investigation and prosecution of alleged terrorism ==
Russian authorities routinely extort confessions from suspected terrorists using torture, instead of engaging in genuine investigative efforts. According to Vyacheslav Izmailov, the terrorist kidnappings of journalists and members of international NGOs in 2005 in Chechnya, along with Andrei Babitsky from Radio Free Europe, Arjan Erkel and Kenneth Glack from Doctors Without Borders were organized by FSB agents.

Investigative journalist Yulia Latynina has accused the Russian security services of staging fake terrorist attacks to report false successes in solving those cases, instead of investigating the actual terrorist attacks.

Russia reportedly abuses its anti-terrorism and anti-extremism laws. On 10 February 2020, seven Russian anarchists and anti-fascist activists were sentenced to six to eighteen years in prison, based on fabricated terrorism charges. The activist were accused to be members of "The Set" an alleged terrorist organization from Penza that aimed to "overthrow the Russian government".

== International cooperation ==
In December 2019 President of Russia Vladimir Putin thanked his American counterpart Donald Trump for a tip which allowed the prevention of a terrorist attack in St. Petersburg.

== See also ==
- Far-right politics in Russia
- SR Combat Organization
- Kizlyar raid
- Right-wing terrorism in Russia
- State-sponsored terrorism#Russia
- Russian Federation list of terrorist and extremist organizations
- List of terrorist incidents
- Terrorism in Europe
- Terrorism in the United States
