= List of deaths related to the 1999 Russian apartment bombings =

Many people have been allegedly killed in connection with the Russian apartment bombings.

== List of related deaths ==
=== Authors ===
- Alexander Litvinenko, an author of two books about the events, was assassinated in London. In a book he co-authored with Yuri Felshtinsky, Mr. Litvinenko claimed that FSB was behind the bombings.

=== Journalists ===
- Artyom Borovik investigated the Moscow apartment bombings and prepared a series of publications about them, according to Grigory Yavlinsky. He received numerous death threats and died in an airplane crash in March 2000.
- Anna Politkovskaya was murdered in 2006. She asked 2004 presidential nominees about the bombings.

=== Diplomats ===
- Igor Ponomarev died in London shortly before his scheduled meeting with Mario Scaramella, Mr. Litvinenko's associate.

=== Politicians ===
- Sergei Yushenkov, a Russian lawmaker and vice-chairmen of unofficial Sergei Kovalev commission created to investigate the bombings was assassinated in April 2003
- Yuri Shchekochikhin, a Russian lawmaker and member of Kovalev commission was apparently poisoned on July 3, 2003
- Otto Lacis, another member of Kovalev commission, was assaulted in November 2003. He died two years later after a car accident.

=== Members of the FSB ===
- FSB General German Ugryumov who, at the time during which he was allegedly supervising the 1999 attacks; was a key figure in the FSB's counterterrorism section. Is alleged by some to have committed suicide following his receiving of a package the day prior to his death on May 31, 2001. This package may have contained kompromat from the FSB, alongside a confirmed notification that he was being promoted to Admiral.
- Maxim Lazovsky, an FSB officer who was allegedly involved in staging of bombings in Moscow in 1994.
- Vladimir Romanovich, an FSB officer who was identified by Mikhail Trepashkin as the man who rented basement of one of the bombed buildings, died in a hit and run accident in Cyprus

=== Official suspects of the case ===
- Arab-born Mujahid Ibn al-Khattab was poisoned by the FSB in 2002.
- Denis Saitakov, an ethnic Tatar from Uzbekistan, was killed in Georgia in 1999-2000)
- Khakim Abayev, an ethnic Karachai, was killed by FSB special forces in May 2004 in Ingushetia
- Ravil Akhmyarov, an ethnic Tatar, was killed in Chechnya in 1999-2000
- Timur Batchayev, an ethnic Karachai, was killed in Georgia in the clash with police during which Krymshakhalov was arrested
- Zaur Batchayev, an ethnic Karachai, was killed in Chechnya in 1999-2000

== People who disappeared ==
- Achemez Gochiyayev who rented basements of the bombed buildings under request from Dyshenkov and later reported about other mined buildings to police, according to his tape that Chechen middle men passed to Sergei Kovalev Commission.
- Three FSB agents (two men and a woman) who conducted the "training exercise" in the city of Ryazan. Their identities and fate remains unknown although their photos were advertised on Russian television.
