= 1999 Russian apartment bombings =

Terrorist bombings in Russia

Russian apartment bombings
- Location: Buynaksk, Moscow, and Volgodonsk
- Date: 4–16 September 1999
- Target: Residential apartment buildings in Russia
- Attack type: Time bombs
- Weapon: RDX
- Deaths: 307
- Injuries: 1,700+
- Perpetrators: Disputed: Russian government (FSB and GRU); Achemez Gochiyayev and accomplices

In September 1999, a series of explosions hit four apartment blocks in the Russian cities of Buynaksk, Moscow, and Volgodonsk, killing more than 300, injuring more than 1,000, and spreading a wave of fear across the country. The bombings, together with the 1999 war of Dagestan, triggered the Second Chechen War. The handling of the crisis by Vladimir Putin, who was prime minister at the time, boosted his popularity greatly and helped him attain the presidency within a few months.

The blasts hit Buynaksk on 4 September and Moscow on 9 and 13 September. Another bombing happened in Volgodonsk on 16 September. Chechen militants were blamed for the bombings, but denied responsibility, along with Chechen president Aslan Maskhadov.

A suspicious device resembling those used in the bombings was found and defused in an apartment block in the Russian city of Ryazan on 22 September. On 23 September, Vladimir Putin even praised the vigilance of the inhabitants of Ryazan and ordered the air bombing of Grozny, which marked the beginning of the Second Chechen War. Three Russian Federal Security Service (FSB) agents who had planted the devices at Ryazan were arrested by the local police. The next day, FSB director Nikolai Patrushev announced that the incident in Ryazan had been an anti-terror drill and the device found there contained only sugar, and freed the FSB agents involved.

The official investigation of the Buynaksk bombing was completed in 2001, while the investigations of the Moscow and Volgodonsk bombings were completed in 2002. In 2000, seven people were convicted of perpetrating the Buynaksk attack. According to the court ruling on the Moscow and Volgodonsk bombings, which was announced in 2004, the attacks were organized and led by Achemez Gochiyaev, who remains at large. All bombings, the court ruled, were ordered by Islamist warlords Ibn Al-Khattab and Abu Omar al-Saif, who have been killed. Five other suspects have been killed and six have been convicted by Russian courts on terrorism-related charges.

Attempts at an independent investigation faced obstruction from the Russian government. State Duma deputy Yuri Shchekochikhin filed two motions for a parliamentary investigation of the events, but the motions were rejected by the State Duma in March 2000. An independent public commission to investigate the bombings was chaired by Duma deputy Sergei Kovalev. The commission was rendered ineffective because of the government's refusal to respond to its inquiries. Two key members of the Kovalev Commission, Sergei Yushenkov and Yuri Shchekochikhin, have since died in apparent assassinations. The commission's lawyer and investigator Mikhail Trepashkin was arrested and served four years in prison "for revealing state secrets".

Although the bombings were widely blamed on Chechen terrorists, their guilt was never conclusively proven. A number of historians and investigative journalists have instead called the bombings a false flag attack perpetrated by Russian state security services to win public support for a new war in Chechnya and to boost the popularity of Vladimir Putin prior to the upcoming presidential elections. Former FSB agent Alexander Litvinenko, who blamed the FSB for the bombings and was a critic of Putin, was assassinated in London in 2006. A British inquiry later determined that Litvinenko's murder was "probably" carried out with the approval of Vladimir Putin and Nikolai Patrushev.

== Preceding events ==
=== Advance warnings about the impending bombings ===
In July 1999, Russian journalist Aleksandr Zhilin, writing in the Moskovskaya Pravda, warned that there would be terrorist attacks in Moscow organised by the government. Using a leaked Kremlin document as evidence, he added that the motive would be to undermine the opponents of the Russian president Boris Yeltsin. These included Moscow mayor Yury Luzhkov and former prime minister Yevgeny Primakov. However, this warning was ignored.

According to Amy Knight, "even more significant is the fact that a respected and influential Duma deputy, Konstantin Borovoi, was told on September 9, the day of the first Moscow apartment bombing, that there was to be a terrorist attack in the city. His source was an officer of the Russian military intelligence (GRU). Borovoy transmitted this information to FSB officials serving on Yeltsin's Security Council, but he was ignored."

=== War in Dagestan ===
On 7 August 1999, an Islamist group, led by Shamil Basayev and Ibn al-Khattab, invaded the Russian republic of Dagestan. The war in Dagestan was allegedly planned in advance by the Russian government to justify starting the war in Chechnya. However, the initial plan included only a limited campaign to occupy the northern third of Chechnya up to the Terek River valley. After the apartment bombings, Putin approved a more ambitious campaign to subdue all of Chechnya.

== Bombings ==
=== Overview ===
Four apartment bombings took place and at least three attempted bombings were prevented. All bombings had the same "signature", based on the nature and the volume of the destruction. In each case a powerful explosive was used, and the timers were set to go off at night and inflict the maximum number of civilian casualties. The explosives were placed to destroy the weakest, most critical elements of the buildings and force them to "collapse like a house of cards". The individuals behind the bombings were able to obtain or manufacture several tons of powerful explosives and deliver them to numerous destinations across Russia.

=== Manezhnaya Square, Moscow ===
On 31 August 1999, at 20:00 local time, a bomb exploded in the amusement arcade of the Manezh Square shopping complex of Moscow. At least 29 people were injured. According to the FSB, the explosion had been caused by a bomb of about 300 grams of explosives.

On 2 September 1999, an unknown person called and claimed that the bombing was committed by the militant organization the "Liberation Army of Dagestan".

=== Buynaksk, Dagestan ===
On 4 September 1999, at 22:00, a car bomb detonated outside a five-story apartment building in the city of Buynaksk in Dagestan, near the border of Chechnya. The building was housing Russian border guard soldiers and their families. Sixty-four people were killed and 133 were injured in the explosion.

On 4 September 1999, another bomb was discovered shortly after the explosion in the city of Buynaksk in Dagestan. The defused bomb was in a car containing 2,706 kilograms (5,966 lb) of explosive material. It was discovered by local residents in a parking lot surrounded by an army hospital and residential buildings.

=== Moscow, Pechatniki ===
A photo of the bombing at Guryanova St. shows a collapsed section of the building

Involved locations in Moscow

On 9 September 1999, shortly after midnight at 20:00 GMT, a bomb detonated on the ground floor of an apartment building in southeast Moscow (19 Guryanova Street). The explosive power was equivalent to 300–400 kilograms (660–880 lb) of TNT. The nine-story building was destroyed, killing 106 people inside (with early reports giving 93 dead) and injuring 249 others, and damaging 19 nearby buildings. A total of 108 apartments were destroyed during the bombing. An FSB spokesman announced that traces of RDX and TNT were found on items removed from the site of the explosion. Residents said a few minutes before the blast four men were seen speeding away from the building in a car.

The FSB declared the bombing a terrorist attack the following morning, 10 September 1999. That day, Vladimir Putin was due to fly to Auckland for the 1999 APEC summit; after a brief consultation with Boris Yeltsin, it was decided that the trip go ahead as planned. Yeltsin had originally intended to go himself, but reasoned to Bill Clinton that Putin would almost certainly be president himself by the year 2000, contrary to speculation over Yeltsin's successor. Prior to his flight, Putin telephoned Clinton and claimed he had "every reason to believe" that Chechen extremists were not only behind the attacks but had links to the Al-Qaeda group which had perpetrated the bombings of the U.S. embassies in Nairobi and Dar es Salaam the previous year. Putin and Clinton would have their first face-to-face meeting in Auckland the following day, and Putin flew back shortly afterward.

Yeltsin ordered the search of 30,000 residential buildings in Moscow for explosives. He took personal control of the investigation of the blast. Putin declared 13 September a day of mourning for the victims of the attacks.

=== Moscow, Kashirskoye highway ===
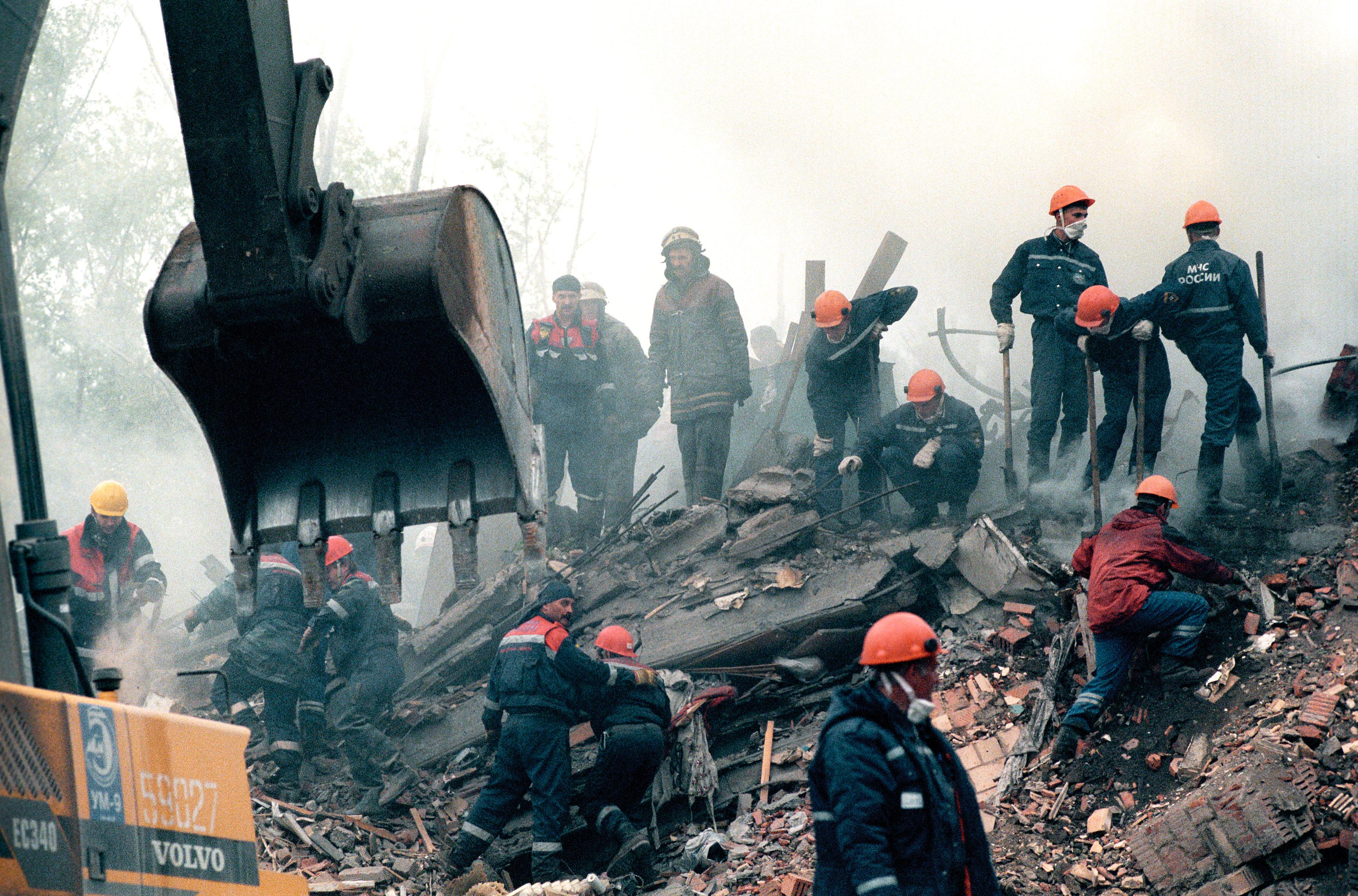
Rescuers digging for survivors after Kashira road bombing.

On 13 September 1999, at 05:00, a large bomb exploded in a basement of an apartment block on Kashirskoye Highway in southern Moscow, about 6 kilometres (3.7 mi) from the place of the last attack. This was the deadliest blast in the chain of bombings (because the apartment was built with brick), with 119 people killed and 200 injured. The eight-story building was flattened, littering the street with debris and throwing some concrete pieces hundreds of meters away.

=== Moscow, prevented bombings ===
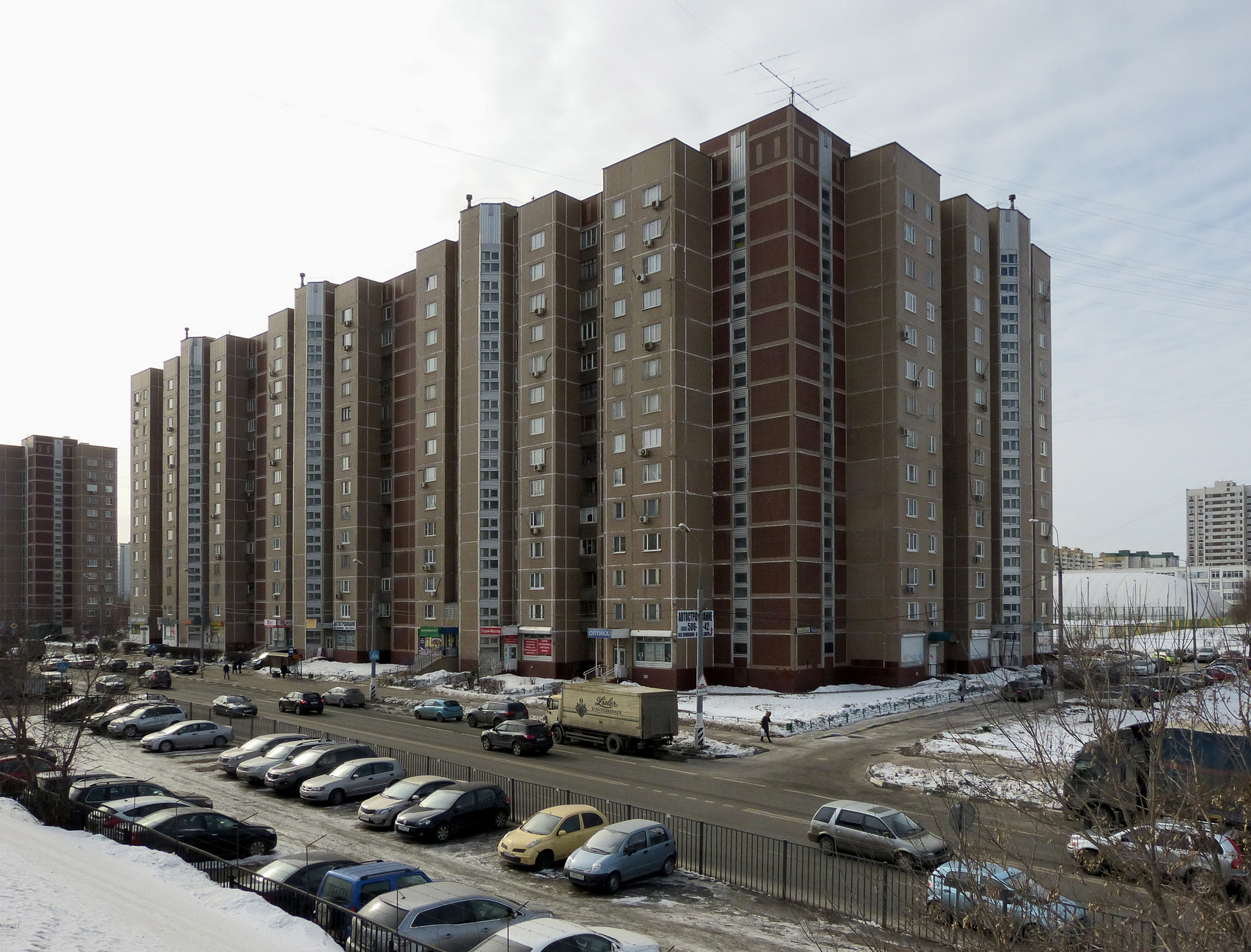
Apartment on Borisovskiye Prudy street, Moscow, where one of the bombs was found and disarmed in September 1999.

On 13 September 1999, a local businessman Achemez Gochiyaev called to police and reported about bombs located in apartment blocks on Borisovskiye Prudy and Kapotnya in Moscow. The police found and defused two bombs.

Gochiyaev claimed that he was framed by his old acquaintance, an FSB officer who asked him to rent basements "as storage facilities" at four locations where bombs were later found. After the second explosion on Kashirskoye highway Gochiyaev realized he was set up, called the police and told them about the basements of two other buildings at Borisovskie Prudy and Kapotnya, where the explosives were actually found and explosions averted. In 2002 Felshtinsky and Litvinenko obtained a written testimony from Achemez Gochiyaev as well as a video recording and several photographs about it. The statement by Gochiyaev was also received by Prima News agency.

=== Announcement of a Volgodonsk bombing in the Russian Duma ===
On 13 September, just hours after the second explosion in Moscow, Russian Duma speaker Gennadiy Seleznyov of the Communist Party made an announcement, "I have just received a report. According to information from Rostov-on-Don, an apartment building in the city of Volgodonsk was blown up last night." When the Volgodonsk bombing happened on 16 September, Vladimir Zhirinovsky questioned Seleznyov in the Duma the following day, but Seleznyov turned his microphone off. Later, Seleznyov said it was a misunderstanding, and he actually referred to an explosion organized by criminal gangs which took place in Volgodonsk on 12 September.

According to Philip Short, Seleznyov made an announcement based on a wire service message about an explosion which took place in Volgodonsk on 12 September and killed one person. At the time it was thought that this (smaller and eventually found to be unrelated) explosion was another in the same series as the preceding ones in Moscow and Buynaksk.

Alexander Litvinenko believed that someone had mixed up the order of the blasts, "the usual Kontora mess up". According to Litvinenko, "Moscow-2 was on the 13th and Volgodonsk on 16th, but they got it to the speaker the other way around". Investigator Mikhail Trepashkin said that the man who gave Seleznyov the note was indeed an FSB officer.

=== Volgodonsk, Rostov Oblast ===
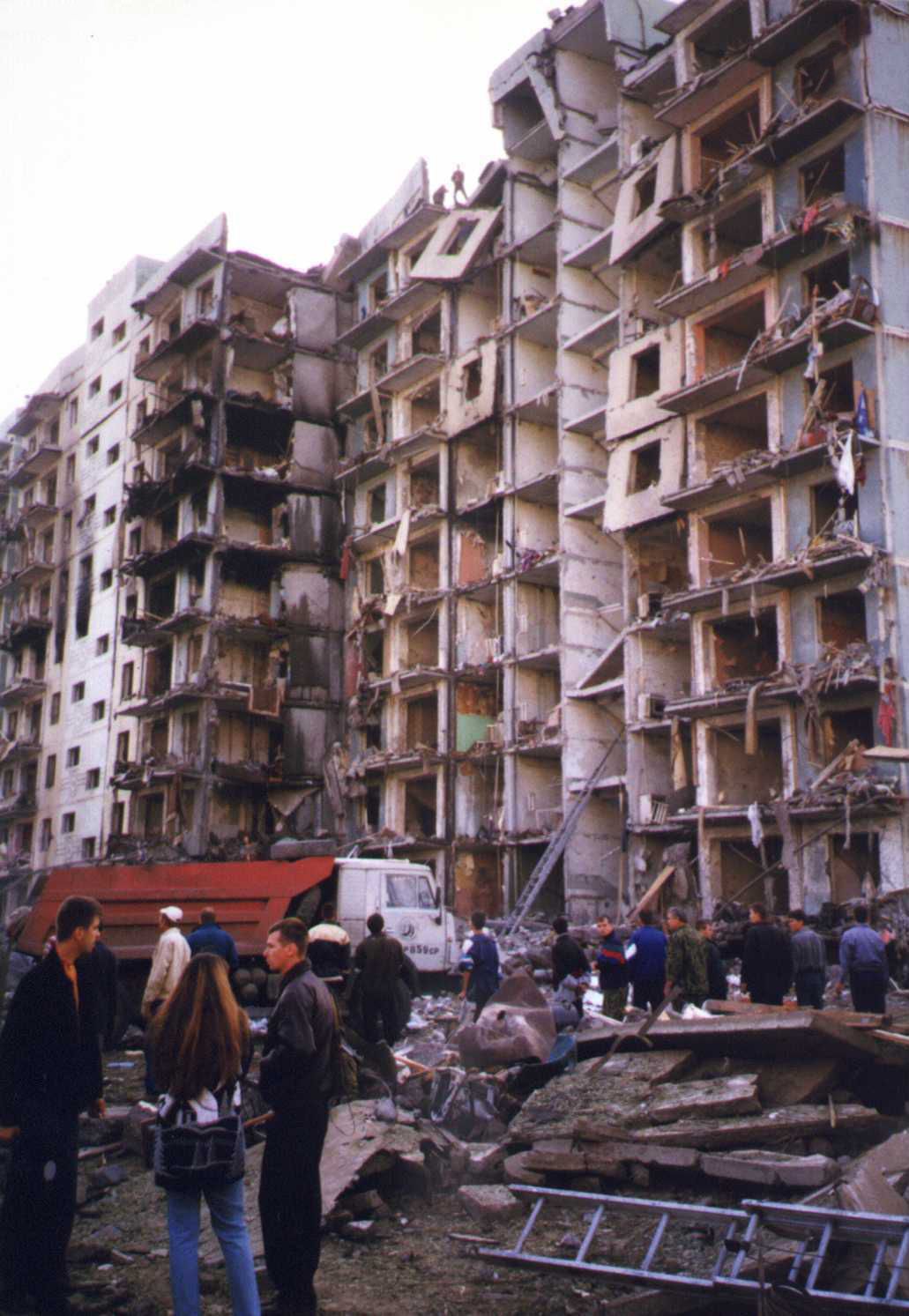
Volgodonsk bomb partially destroyed an apartment block.

A truck bomb exploded on 16 September 1999, outside a nine-story apartment complex in the southern Russian city of Volgodonsk, killing 17 people and injuring 69. The bombing took place at 5:57 am. Surrounding buildings were also damaged. The blast also happened 14 km (9 mi) from a nuclear power plant. Prime Minister Vladimir Putin signed a decree calling on law enforcement and other agencies to develop plans within three days to protect industry, transportation, communications, food processing centres and nuclear complexes.

=== Prevented bombings in Ryazan ===
At 20:30 on 22 September 1999, Alexei Kartofelnikov, a resident of an apartment building in the city of Ryazan noticed two suspicious men who carried sacks into the basement from a car. While the license plate indicated that the car was registered in Moscow, a sheet of paper was taped over the last two digits, and the number written on it implied that the car was local.

Kartofelnikov alerted the police, but by the time they arrived the car and the men were gone. The policemen found three sacks of white powder in the basement, each weighing 50 kg (110 lb). A detonator and a timing device were attached to the sacks. The detonator was reported by a Russian newspaper to be a 12-gauge shotgun shell filled with powder. The timer was set to 5:30 AM. Yuri Tkachenko, the head of the local bomb squad, disconnected the detonator and the timer. Reportedly, Tkachenko tested the three sacks of white substance with a "MO-2" gas analyser, which detected RDX vapors.

Inhabitants of the apartment building were evacuated. According to David Satter, residents of neighboring buildings fled their homes in terror, to the effect that nearly 30,000 residents spent the night on the street. Police and rescue vehicles converged from different parts of the city. As many as 1,200 local police officers were put on alert, the railroad stations and the airport were surrounded, and roadblocks were set up on highways leaving the city.

At 01:30 on 23 September 1999, explosive engineers of the Ryazan UFSB took a sample of substance from the suspicious-looking sacks to a firing ground located about 1.6 km (1 mi) away from Ryazan for testing. During the substance tests at that area they tried to explode it by means of a detonator, which was also made from a shotgun shell, but the substance failed to detonate. At 05:00, Radio Rossiya reported about the attempted bombing, noting that the bomb was set up to go off at 05:30. In the morning, Ryazan resembled a city under siege. Composite sketches of three suspected terrorists, two men and a woman, were posted everywhere in the city and shown on TV. At 08:00 Russian television reported the attempt to blow out the building in Ryazan and identified the explosive used in the bomb as RDX. Vladimir Rushailo announced later that police prevented a terrorist act. A news report at 16:00 reported that the explosives failed to detonate during their testing outside the city.

At 19:00, Vladimir Putin praised the vigilance of the inhabitants of Ryazan, and called for the air bombing of the Chechen capital Grozny in response to the terrorism acts. He said:

If the sacks which proved to contain explosive were noticed, that means there is a positive side to it, if only the fact that the public is reacting correctly to the events taking place in our country today. I'd like ... to thank the public. ... No panic, no sympathy for the bandits.

On 23 September Natalia Yukhnova, a telephone service employee in Ryazan, tapped into a suspicious phone call to Moscow and overheard the following instruction: "Leave one at a time, there are patrols everywhere". The called number was traced to a telephone exchange unit serving FSB offices.

When arrested, the detainees produced FSB identification cards. They were soon released on orders from Moscow.

The position of Russian authorities on the Ryazan incident changed significantly over time. Initially, it was declared by the FSB and federal government to be a real threat. However, after the people who planted the bomb were identified, the official version changed to "security training".

On 24 September, FSB director Nikolai Patrushev announced that it was an exercise that was being carried out to test responses after the earlier blasts.

The Ryazan FSB "reacted with fury" and issued a statement saying:

This announcement came as a surprise to us and appeared at the moment when the ... FSB had identified the places of residence in Ryazan of those involved in planting the explosive device and was prepared to detain them.

FSB also issued a public apology about the incident. In a show Independent Investigation on NTV, Evgeniy Savostyanov, former director of Moscow and Moscow Oblast regional FSB branch, has criticized the FSB for performing such exercise on residential buildings with inhabitants inside and without notifying local authorities.

In excerpts from the planned Ryazan operation, first published in 2002, it was stated that the exercise was overseen by the head of the FSB's Center of Special Operations (CSO), Major General Alexander Tikhonov.

==== Detonator and explosives detection equipment ====
In February 2000, Novaya Gazeta journalist Pavel Voloshin published an essay entitled What happened in Ryazan: Sugar or Hexogen?, that was partly based on his two-hour long interview with Yuri Tkachenko, the police explosives expert who defused the Ryazan bomb. The essay noted that it's well known that a gas analyser that tested the vapours coming from the sacks indicated the presence of RDX. Tkachenko said that he was completely certain that the instrument was in correct working order. The gas analyser was of world-class quality, cost $20,000, and was maintained by a specialist who worked according to a strict schedule, making frequent prophylactic checks, because the device contained a radioactive source. Meticulous care in the handling of the gas analyser was a necessity because the lives of the bomb squad experts depended on the reliability of their equipment. Speaking of the detonator, Voloshin noted that people who disarmed the device (Tkachenko and his bomb squad) claimed that the detonator attached to the sacks was not a dummy and had been prepared on a professional level. The police warrant officer who answered the original call and discovered the bomb insisted that there were no doubts it was a combat situation.

==== The case of Private Alexei Pinyaev ====
In March 2000, Novaya Gazeta journalist Pavel Voloshin reported the account of Private Alexei P. (later identified as Pinyaev) of the 137th Guards Airborne Regiment. Pinyaev guarded a storehouse with weapons and ammunition near the city of Ryazan. Together with a friend, he entered the storehouse to see the weapons. The friends were surprised to see that the storehouse contained sacks with the word "sugar" on them. Pinyaev and his friend were discouraged, but didn't want to leave the storehouse empty-handed. The two paratroopers cut a hole in one of the bags and put some sugar in a plastic bag. They made tea with the sugar, but the taste of the tea was terrible. They became frightened because the substance might turn out to be saltpeter, and brought the plastic bag to a platoon commander. He consulted a sapper, who identified the substance as hexogen.

After the newspaper report, FSB officers descended on Pinyayev's unit, accused them of divulging a state secret and told them, "You guys can't even imagine what serious business you’ve got yourselves tangled up in." The regiment later sued publishers of Novaya Gazeta for insulting the honour of the Russian Army, since there was no Private Alexei Pinyayev in the regiment, according to their statement.

A report aired by ORT in March 2000 and created by journalist Leonid Grozin and operator Dmitry Vishnevoy accused Novaya Gazeta of lying. According to Grozin and Vishnevoy, there is no storehouse at the test range of the 137th Regiment. Alexei Pinyaev has admitted meeting with Pavel Voloshin, but claimed that he was merely asked to confirm a pre-conceived story. At an FSB press conference in 2001, Private Pinyayev stated that there was no hexogen in the 137th Airborne Regiment and that he was hospitalised in December 1999 and no longer visited the test range.

=== Explosives in the apartment bombings ===
After the bombing at Guryanova Street on 9 September, the Moscow FSB reported that items removed from the scene showed traces of TNT and RDX (or "hexogen") explosives. However, FSB has declared later that the explosives used in the bombings were a mixture of aluminium powder, ammonium nitrate, TNT and sugar prepared by the perpetrators in a concrete mixer at a fertiliser factory in Urus-Martan, Chechnya. Also, each bomb contained some plastic explosive used as an explosive booster.

RDX is produced in only one factory in Russia, in the city of Perm. According to David Satter, the FSB changed the story about the type of explosive, since it was difficult to explain how huge amounts of RDX disappeared from the closely guarded Perm facility.

=== Impact on survivors ===
Multiple survivors of the bombings have developed disabilities, with many of them diagnosed with post-traumatic stress disorder. In 2006, Irina Khalai, a survivor of the Volgodonsk bombing, founded the NGO "Volga-Don", which promotes legislation for the legal recognition of victims of terrorist attacks.

== Claims and denials of responsibility for the blasts ==
On 9 September, an anonymous person, speaking with a Caucasian accent, phoned the Interfax news agency, saying that the blasts in Moscow and Buynaksk were "our response to the bombings of civilians in the villages in Chechnya and Dagestan." On 15 September, an unidentified man, again speaking with a Caucasian accent, called the ITAR-TASS news agency, claiming to represent a group called the Liberation Army of Dagestan. He said that the explosions in Buynaksk and Moscow were carried out by his organisation. According to him, the attacks were a retaliation to the deaths of Muslim women and children during Russian air raids in Dagestan. "We will answer death with death," the caller said. Russian officials from both the Interior Ministry and FSB, at the time, expressed scepticism over the claims and said there is no such organization. On 15 September 1999, a Dagestani official also denied the existence of a "Dagestan Liberation Army".

In an interview published in Lidove Noviny on 9 September, Shamil Basayev denied responsibility for the bombings and said that it had been the work of Dagestanis. According to Basayev, the bombings were a retribution for the military operation of the Russian Army against "three small villages" in Dagestan. In subsequent interviews, Basayev said he did not know who perpetrated the bombings.

In a 12 September interview with Associated Press, Ibn al-Khattab said that "From now on they will get our bombs everywhere! Let Russia await our explosions blasting through their cities! I swear we will do it!" However, in a subsequent interview on 14 September to the Interfax agency in Grozny, Khattab denied responsibility for the bombings.

Chechen Foreign Ministry issued an official statement on 14 September condemning Moscow blasts, and affirming that "Ichkeria stands firmly against terrorism in any manifestation".

In February 2000, the US Secretary of State Madeleine Albright stated they have not seen any evidence that ties the bombings to Chechnya.

== Official government investigations ==
=== Criminal investigation and court ruling ===
In 2000, investigation of the Buynaksk attack was completed and seven people were convicted of the bombing.

Russia's pre-trial investigation of the Moscow and Volgodonsk bombings was finished in 2002. According to the Russian State Prosecutor office, all apartment bombings were executed under command of ethnic Karachay Achemez Gochiyayev and planned by Ibn al-Khattab and Abu Omar al-Saif, Arab militants fighting in Chechnya on the side of Chechen insurgents. Al-Khattab and al-Saif were killed during the Second Chechen War. According to investigators, the explosives were prepared at a fertiliser factory in Urus-Martan Chechnya, by "mixing aluminium powder, nitre and sugar in a concrete mixer", or by also putting there RDX and TNT. From there they were sent to a food storage facility in Kislovodsk, which was managed by an uncle of one of the terrorists, Yusuf Krymshakhalov. Another conspirator, Ruslan Magayayev, leased a KamAZ truck in which the sacks were stored for two months. After everything was planned, the participants were organised into several groups which then transported the explosives to different cities.

According to investigators, the explosion in Moscow mall on 31 August was committed by another man, Magomed-Zagir Garzhikaev on the orders from Shamil Basayev, according to the FSB.

Court hearings on the Moscow and Volgodonsk attacks were held behind closed doors, and were completed in 2004. The process has produced 90 volumes of proceedings, five of which were classified.

==== Court rulings ====
A photo of Al-Hattab (second from left) and Gochiyayev (second from right). The photo was allegedly fabricated by the FSB to prove the guilt by Gochiyaev.

According to the court ruling, Al-Khattab paid Gochiyayev $500,000 to carry out the attacks at Guryanova Street, Kashirskoye Highway, and Borisovskiye Prudy, and then helped to hide Gochiyayev and his accomplices in Chechnya. In early September 1999, Magayayev, Krymshamkhalov, Batchayev and Dekkushev reloaded the cargo into a Mercedes-Benz 2236 trailer and delivered it to Moscow. En route, they were protected from possible complications by an accomplice, Khakim Abayev, who accompanied the trailer in another car. In Moscow they were met by Achemez Gochiyayev, who registered in Hotel Altai under the fake name "Laipanov", and Denis Saitakov. The explosives were left in a warehouse in Ulitsa Krasnodonskaya, which was leased by pseudo-Laipanov (Gochiyayev). The next day, the explosives were delivered in "ZIL-5301" vans to three addresses—Ulitsa Guryanova, Kashirskoye Shosse and Ulitsa Borisovskiye Prudy, where pseudo-Laipanov leased cellars. Gochiyayev supervised the placement of the bombs in the rented cellars. Next followed the explosions at the former two addresses. The explosion at 16 Borisovskiye Prudy was prevented.

According to the court, 4 September Buinaksk bombing was ordered by Al-Khattab. Reportedly, since the perpetrators have managed to explode only one truck bomb instead of the two, Khattab called it a "botched job" and paid $300,000 for it, which was a part of the sum he originally promised. One of the suspects confessed having loaded the trucks with sacks in Buynaksk, but claimed he did not know what they were intended for.

The explosion in the mall on Manezhnaya Square was the subject of a separate court process held in Moscow in 2009. The court accused Khalid Khuguyev (Russian: Халид Хугуев) and Magumadzir Gadzhikayev (Russian: Магумадзаир Гаджиакаев) of organisation and execution of the 1999 explosions in the Manezhnaya Square mall and in hotel Intourist and sentenced them to 25 years and 15 years of imprisonment, correspondingly.

==== Sentences ====
Adam Dekkushev and Yusuf Krymshakhalov have both been sentenced to life terms in a special regime colony. Both defendants have pleaded guilty only to some of the charges. Dekkushev acknowledged that he knew the explosives he transported were to be used for an act of terror. Dekkushev also confirmed Gochiyaev's role in the attacks. Dekkushev was extradited to Russia on 14 April 2002 to stand trial. Krymshakhalov was apprehended and extradicted to Moscow. Achemez Gochiyaev, allegedly the head of the group that carried out the attacks, remains a fugitive, and is under an international search warrant.

==== Suspects and accused ====
In September 1999, hundreds of Chechen nationals (out of the more than 100,000 permanently living in Moscow) were briefly detained and interrogated in Moscow, as a wave of anti-Chechen sentiments swept the city. However, no Chechens were tried for the Buinaksk, Moscow or Volgodonsk attacks. Rather, it were Dagestani Wahhabis in the case of the Buinaksk bombing, and Karachay Wahhabis in the case of Moscow and Volgodonsk attacks.

According to the official investigation, the following people either delivered explosives, stored them, or harboured other suspects:

===== Moscow bombings =====
- Ibn al-Khattab, a Saudi-born Mujahid, who was poisoned by the FSB in 2002.
- Achemez Gochiyayev, an ethnic Karachai, who has not been arrested and remains at large or died. In an interview with Dmitry Gordon published on 18 May 2020, former GRU officer Igor Strelkov said that during the initial stage of the Second Chechen war, he was a part of a group which attempted to capture Achemez Gochiyaev. In a statement released in January 2004, the FSB said, "until we arrest Gochiyayev, the case [of the apartment block bombings of 1999] will not be closed."
- Denis Saitakov (an ethnic Tatar from Uzbekistan), killed in Georgia in 1999–2000
- Khakim Abayev (an ethnic Karachai), killed by FSB special forces in May 2004 in Ingushetia
- Ravil Akhmyarov (a Russian citizen), Surname indicates an ethnic Tatar, killed in Chechnya in 1999–2000
- Yusuf Krymshamkhalov (an ethnic Karachai and resident of Kislovodsk), arrested in Georgia in December 2002, extradited to Russia and sentenced to life imprisonment in January 2004, after a two-month secret trial held without a jury
- Stanislav Lyubichev (a traffic police inspector, resident of Kislovodsk, Stavropol Krai), who helped the truck with explosives pass the checkpoint after getting a sack of sugar as a bribe, sentenced to four years in May 2003

===== Volgodonsk bombing =====
- Timur Batchayev (an ethnic Karachai), killed in Georgia in the clash with police during which Krymshakhalov was arrested
- Zaur Batchayev (an ethnic Karachai) killed in Chechnya in 1999–2000
- Adam Dekkushev (an ethnic Karachai), arrested in Georgia, threw a grenade at police during the arrest, extradited to Russia and sentenced to life imprisonment in January 2004, after a two-month secret trial held without a jury

===== Buynaksk bombing =====
- Isa Zainutdinov (an ethnic Avar) and native of Dagestan, sentenced to life imprisonment in March 2001
- Alisultan Salikhov (an ethnic Avar) and native of Dagestan, sentenced to life imprisonment in March 2001
- Magomed Salikhov (an ethnic Avar) and native of Dagestan, arrested in Azerbaijan in November 2004, extradited to Russia, found not guilty on the charge of terrorism by the jury on 24 January 2006; found guilty of participating in an armed force and illegal crossing of the national border, he was retried again on the same charges on 13 November 2006 and again found not guilty, this time on all charges, including the ones he was found guilty of in the first trial. According to Kommersant Salikhov admitted that he made a delivery of paint to Dagestan for Ibn al-Khattab, although he was not sure what was really delivered.
- Ziyavudin Ziyavudinov (a native of Dagestan), arrested in Kazakhstan, extradited to Russia, sentenced to 24 years in April 2002
- Abdulkadyr Abdulkadyrov (an ethnic Avar) and native of Dagestan, sentenced to 9 years in March 2001
- Magomed Magomedov (Sentenced to 9 years in March 2001)
- Zainutdin Zainutdinov (an ethnic Avar) and native of Dagestan, sentenced to 3 years in March 2001 and immediately released under amnesty
- Makhach Abdulsamedov (a native of Dagestan, sentenced to 3 years in March 2001 and immediately released under amnesty).

== Attempts at an independent investigation ==
The Russian Duma rejected two motions for a parliamentary investigation of the Ryazan incident. In the Duma a pro-Kremlin party Unity, voted to seal all materials related to the Ryazan incident for the next 75 years and forbade an investigation into what happened.

An independent public commission to investigate the bombings was chaired by Duma deputy Sergei Kovalyov. The commission started its work in February 2002. On 5 March Sergei Yushenkov and Duma member Yuli Rybakov flew to London where they met Alexander Litvinenko and Mikhail Trepashkin. After this meeting, Trepashkin began working with the commission.

However, the public commission was rendered ineffective because of government refusal to respond to its inquiries. Two key members of the commission, Sergei Yushenkov and Yuri Shchekochikhin, both Duma members, have died in apparent assassinations in April 2003 and July 2003, respectively. Another member of the commission, Otto Lacis, was assaulted in November 2003 and two years later, on 3 November 2005, he died in a hospital after a car accident.

The commission asked lawyer Mikhail Trepashkin to investigate the case. Trepashkin said he found that the basement of one of the bombed buildings was rented by FSB officer Vladimir Romanovich and that the latter was witnessed by several people. Trepashkin also investigated a letter attributed to Achemez Gochiyayev and found that the alleged assistant of Gochiyayev who arranged the delivery of sacks might have been Kapstroi-2000 vice president Alexander Karmishin, a resident of Vyazma.

Trepashkin was unable to bring the alleged evidence to the court because he was arrested in October 2003 (on charges of illegal arms possession) and imprisoned in Nizhny Tagil, just a few days before he was to make his findings public. He was sentenced by a Moscow military closed court to four years imprisonment on a charge of revealing state secrets. Amnesty International issued a statement that "there are serious grounds to believe that Mikhail Trepashkin was arrested and convicted under falsified criminal charges which may be politically motivated, in order to prevent him continuing his investigative and legal work related to the 1999 apartment bombings in Moscow and other cities".

In a letter to Olga Konskaya, Trepashkin wrote that some time before the bombings, Moscow's Regional Directorate against Organized Crimes (RUOP GUVD) arrested several people for selling the explosive RDX. Following that, Nikolai Patrushev's Directorate of FSB officers came to the GUVD headquarters, captured evidence and ordered the investigators fired. Trepashkin wrote that he learned about the story at a meeting with several RUOP officers in the year 2000. They claimed that their colleagues could present eyewitness accounts in a court. They offered a video tape with evidence against the RDX dealers. Mr Trepashkin did not publicise the meeting fearing for lives of the witnesses and their families.

According to Trepashkin, his supervisors and the people from the FSB promised not to arrest him if he left the Kovalev commission and started working together with the FSB "against Alexander Litvinenko".

On 24 March 2000, two days before the presidential elections, NTV Russia featured the Ryazan events of Fall 1999 in the talk show Independent Investigation. The talk with the residents of the Ryazan apartment building along with FSB public relations director Alexander Zdanovich and Ryazan branch head Alexander Sergeyev was filmed few days earlier. On 26 March, Boris Nemtsov voiced his concern over the possible shut-down of NTV for airing the talk. Seven months later, NTV general manager Igor Malashenko said at the JFK School of Government that Information Minister Mikhail Lesin warned him on several occasions. Malashenko's recollection of Lesin's warning was that by airing the talk show NTV "crossed the line" and that the NTV managers were "outlaws" in the eyes of the Kremlin. According to Alexander Goldfarb, Mr. Malashenko told him that Valentin Yumashev brought a warning from the Kremlin, one day before airing the show, promising in no uncertain terms that the NTV managers "should consider themselves finished" if they went ahead with the broadcast.

Artyom Borovik was among the people who investigated the bombings. He received numerous death threats and died in a suspicious plane crash in March 2000 that was regarded by Felshtinsky and Pribylovsky as a probable assassination.

Journalist Anna Politkovskaya and former security service member Alexander Litvinenko, who investigated the bombings, were killed in 2006.

Surviving victims of the Guryanova street bombing asked President Dmitry Medvedev to resume the official investigation in 2008, but it was not resumed.

In a 2017 discussion at the RFE/RL Sergei Kovalyov said: "I think that the Chechen trace was skilfully fabricated. No one from the people who organized the bombings was found, and no one actually was looking for them". He then was asked by Vladimir Kara-Murza if he believes that several key members of his commission, and even Boris Berezovskiy and Boris Nemtsov who "knew quite a few things about the bombings" were killed to prevent the independent investigation. Kovalev responded: "I cannot state with full confidence that the explosions were organized by the authorities. Although it's clear that the explosions were useful for them, useful for future president Vladimir Vladimirovich Putin, because he had just promised to "waste in the outhouse" (as he said) everyone who had any relation to terrorism. It was politically beneficial for him to scare people with terrorism. That is not proven. But what can be stated with full confidence is this: the investigation of both the Moscow explosions and the so-called "exercises" in Ryazan is trumped up. There can be various possibilities. It seems to me, that Ryazan should have been the next explosion, but I cannot prove that."

== Alleged Russian government involvement ==
According to David Satter, Yuri Felshtinsky, Alexander Litvinenko, Vladimir Pribylovsky and Boris Kagarlitsky, the bombings were a successful false flag operation coordinated by the Russian state security services to win public support for a new full-scale war in Chechnya and to bring Putin to power. Some of them described the bombings as typical "active measures" practised by the KGB in the past.

According to a reconstruction of the events by Felshtinsky and Pribylovsky:

- The bombings in Buynaksk were carried out by a team of twelve GRU officers who were sent to Dagestan and supervised by the head of GRU's 14th Directorate General Nikolai Kostechko. That version was partly based on a testimony by Aleksey Galkin. The bombing in Buynaksk was conducted by the GRU to avoid an "interagency conflict between the FSB and the Ministry of Defense".
- In Moscow, Volgodonsk and Ryazan, the attacks were organized by the FSB through a chain of command that included director of the counter-terrorism department General German Ugryumov, FSB operatives Maxim Lazovsky, Vladimir Romanovich, Ramazan Dyshekov and others. Achemez Gochiyayev, Tatyana Korolyeva, and Alexander Karmishin rented warehouses that received shipments of hexogen disguised as sugar and did not know that the explosives were delivered.
- Adam Dekkushev, Krymshamkhalov, and Timur Batchayev were recruited by FSB agents who presented themselves as "Chechen separatists" to deliver explosives to Volgodonsk and Moscow.
- Names and the fate of FSB agents who planted the bomb in the city of Ryazan remain unknown.

=== Books and films on the subject ===
The theory of Russian government involvement has been described in a number of books and movies on the subject.

David Satter, a senior fellow of the Hudson Institute, authored two books Darkness at Dawn: The Rise of the Russian Criminal State and The Less You Know, The Better You Sleep: Russia's Road to Terror and Dictatorship under Yeltsin and Putin (published by Yale University Press in 2003 and 2016) where he scrutinized the events and came to the conclusion that the bombings were organized by Russian state security services.(Satter 2003)

In 2002, former FSB officer Alexander Litvinenko and historian Yuri Felshtinsky published a book Blowing up Russia: Terror from within.(Felshtinsky & Litvinenko 2007) According to authors the bombings and other terrorist acts have been committed by Russian security services to justify the Second Chechen War and to bring Vladimir Putin to power.

In another book, Lubyanka Criminal Group, Litvinenko and Alexander Goldfarb described the transformation of the FSB into a criminal and terrorist organization, including conducting the bombings. (Litvinenko 2002) Former GRU analyst and historian Viktor Suvorov said that the book describes "a leading criminal group that provides "protection" for all other organized crime in the country and which continues the criminal war against their own people", like their predecessors NKVD and KGB. He added: "The book proves: Lubyanka [the KGB headquarters] was taken over by enemies of the people. ... If Putin's team can not disprove the facts provided by Litvinenko, Putin must shoot himself. Patrushev and all other leadership of Lubyanka Criminal Group must follow his example."

Alexander Goldfarb and Marina Litvinenko published a book Death of a Dissident. They asserted that the murder of Mr. Litvinenko was "the most compelling proof" of the FSB involvement theory. According to the book, the murder of Litvinenko "gave credence to all his previous theories, delivering justice for the tenants of the bombed apartment blocks, the Moscow theater-goers, Sergei Yushenkov, Yuri Shchekochikhin, and Anna Politkovskaya, and the half-exterminated nation of Chechnya, exposing their killers for the whole world to see."

A PBS Frontline documentary on Vladimir Putin also mentioned the theory and FSB involvement, citing the quick removal of rubble and bodies from the bombing scenes before any investigation could take place, the discovery of the Ryazan bomb, the deaths of several people who had attempted to investigate the bombings, as well as the defused Ryazan bomb being made of Russian military explosives and detonators.

A documentary film Assassination of Russia was made in 2000 by two French producers who had previously worked on NTV's Sugar of Ryazan program.

A documentary Nedoverie ("Disbelief") about the bombing controversy made by Russian director Andrei Nekrasov was premiered at the 2004 Sundance Film Festival. The film chronicles the story of Tatyana and Alyona Morozova, the two Russian-American sisters, who had lost their mother in the attack, and decided to find out who did it. His next film on the subject was Rebellion: the Litvinenko Case.

Yuli Dubov, author of The Big Slice, wrote a novel The Lesser Evil, based on the bombings. The main characters of the story are Platon (Boris Berezovsky) and Larry (Badri Patarkatsishvili). They struggle against an evil KGB officer, Old man (apparently inspired by the legendary Philipp Bobkov), who brings another KGB officer, Fedor Fedorovich (Vladimir Putin) to power by staging a series of apartment bombings.

=== Support ===
The view about the bombings being organized and perpetrated by Russian state security services was originally put forward by journalist David Satter and historians Yuri Felshtinsky and Vladimir Pribylovsky, in co-authorship with Alexander Litvinenko. It was later supported by a number of historians. Amy Knight, a historian of the KGB, wrote that it was "abundantly clear" that the FSB was responsible for carrying out the attacks and that Vladimir Putin's "guilt seems clear," since it was inconceivable that the FSB would have done so without the sanction of Putin, the agency's former director and by then Prime Minister of Russia. In her book Putin's Kleptocracy, historian Karen Dawisha summarized evidence related to the bombings and concluded that "to blow up your own innocent and sleeping people in your capital city is an action almost unthinkable. Yet the evidence that the FSB was at least involved in planting a bomb in Ryazan is incontrovertible." According to Timothy Snyder, "it seemed possible" that the perpetrators of the apartment bombings were FSB officers. David Satter considered the bombings as a political provocation by the Russian secret services that was similar to the burning of the Reichstag.

This view has been also supported by investigative journalists. In 2008, British journalist Edward Lucas concluded in his book The New Cold War: Putin's Russia and the Threat to the West that "The weight of evidence so far supports the grimmest interpretation: that the attacks were a ruthlessly planned stunt to create a climate of panic and fear in which Putin would quickly become the country's indisputable leader, as indeed he did." In the September 2009 issue of GQ, veteran war correspondent Scott Anderson wrote about on Putin's role in the Russian apartment bombings, based in part on his interviews with Mikhail Trepashkin The journal owner, Condé Nast, then took extreme measures to prevent an article by Anderson from appearing in the Russian media, both physically and in translation.

Former Russian State Security Council chief Alexandr Lebed in his 29 September 1999 interview with Le Figaro said he was almost convinced that the government organised the terrorist acts. Andrei Illarionov, a former key economic adviser to the Russian president, said that FSB involvement "is not a theory, it is a fact. There is no other element that could have organized the bombings except for the FSB." Later Lebed's public relations staff claimed that he was quoted out of the context.

Russian military analyst Pavel Felgenhauer noted that "The FSB accused Khattab and Gochiyaev, but oddly they did not point the finger at Chechen president Aslan Maskhadov's regime, which is what the war was launched against."

Some US politicians have commented that they consider credible the allegations about Russian state security services as the actual organizers of the bombings. In 2003, U.S. senator John McCain said that "It was during Mr. Putin's tenure as Prime Minister in 1999 that he launched the Second Chechen War following the Moscow apartment bombings. There remain credible allegations that Russia's FSB had a hand in carrying out these attacks. Mr. Putin ascended to the presidency in 2000 by pointing a finger at the Chechens for committing these crimes, launching a new military campaign in Chechnya, and riding a frenzy of public anger into office."

On 11 January 2017, senator Marco Rubio raised the issue of the 1999 bombings during the confirmation hearings for Rex Tillerson. According to senator Rubio, "there's [an] incredible body of reporting, open source and other, that this was all—all those bombings were part of a black flag operation on the part of the FSB." On 10 January 2018, senator Ben Cardin of the United States Senate Foreign Relations Committee released a report entitled "Putin's Asymmetric Assault on Democracy in Russia and Europe: Implications for U.S. National Security". According to the report, "no credible evidence has been presented by the Russian authorities linking Chechen terrorists, or anyone else, to the Moscow bombings."

According to Satter, all four bombings that occurred had a similar "signature" which indicated that the explosives had been carefully prepared, a mark of skilled specialists. The terrorists were able to obtain tons of hexogen explosive and transport it to various locations in Russia; hexogen is produced in one plant in Perm Oblast for whose security the central FSB is responsible. The culprits would also have needed to organise nine explosions (the four that occurred and the five attempted bombings reported by the authorities) in different cities in a two-week period. Satter's estimate for the time required for target plan development, site visits, explosives preparation, renting space at the sites and transporting explosives to the sites was four to four and a half months. Hexogen was however at this time also widely available in Dagestan.

In a speech to the Oxford Union on 12 March 2022, former MI6 officer Christopher Steele voiced support for the idea that the bombings were a false flag operation conducted by Russian security services in order to justify the war in Chechnya.

=== Criticism ===
According to Russian investigative journalist Andrei Soldatov, "From the start, it seemed that the Kremlin was determined to suppress all discussion ... When Alexander Podrabinek, a Russian human rights activist, tried to import copies of Litvinenko's and Felshtinsky's Blowing up Russia in 2003, they were confiscated by the FSB. Trepashkin himself, acting as a lawyer for two relatives of the victims of the blast, was unable to obtain information he requested and was entitled to see by law". However, Soldatov believed that the obstruction might reflect "'paranoia' rather than guilt on the part of the authorities". Consequently, Soldatov argued, that paranoia has produced the very conspiracy theories that the Russian Government intended to eradicate. In their book The New Nobility, Andrei Soldatov and Irina Borogan believe that the Ryazan incident had actually been a training exercise by Vympel, a counter-terrorism FSB unit. Soldatov and Borogan noted that, according to Russian state security services, Achemez Gochiyaev was not an innocent businessman, but a leader of a local Islamist group since the mid-1990s, together with Dekkushev and Krymshamkhalov. Soldatov and Borogan have also noted a partial admission of guilt by Dekkushev and Krymshamkhalov after their interrogations during a trial in 2003.

According to Robert Bruce Ware, the simplest explanation for the apartment block blasts is that they were perpetrated by Islamist extremists from North Caucasus who sought retribution for the attacks of the Federal forces against the Islamist enclave in the central Dagestan, known as the Islamic Djamaat. Ware points out that that would explain the timing of the attacks, and why there were no attacks after the date on which the insurgents were driven from Dagestan. It would also explain why no Chechen claimed responsibility. Also it would explain Basayev's reference to responsibility of Dagestanis and it would be consistent with the initial vow of Khattab to set off the bombs blasting through Russian cities.

Political scientist Ronald R. Pope in his review of David Satter's book Darkness at Dawn cited Kirill Pankratov's criticism, published as a contribution to Johnson's Russia List. Regarding the apartment bombings, Pankratov argued that the Russian authorities did not need an additional justification to wage a war against Chechnya, in view of high-profile kidnappings and the invasion of Dagestan.

Political scientist Brian Taylor believes that there is too little evidence to decide which version of the events is correct, as the available evidence is fragmentary and controversial. Taylor identifies several reasons to doubt the conspiracy version. First, while the bombings did propel Putin to power, that alone is not proof that this was the goal of the attacks. Second, there was a casus belli even without the bombings—namely, the invasion of Dagestan and multiple kidnappings in the region in the preceding years. Third, if the goal of the bombings was to justify a new war, one or two bombings in Moscow would be more than adequate; any subsequent bombings would be potentially dangerous, because they would increase the risk to expose the conspiracy. Fourth, a complex plot involving multiple players and a large number of FSB operatives could not be kept secret. According to Taylor, it is plausible that the FSB "simulated" an attack in Ryazan in order to claim credit for "uncovering" it; however, the plot was foiled by vigilant local denizens and law enforcement personnel, and the "training exercise" justification was improvised after the plot failed.

Max Abrahms, a researcher who is critical of the efficacy of terrorism in general, argued that the bombings were detrimental for the self-determination of Chechnya. He noted that the Chechen Republic of Ichkeria has achieved a de facto independence from Russia after the Khasavyurt Accord, with two thirds of Russian citizens favoring the separation of the breakaway republic. However, the public opinion in Russia has changed dramatically after the bombings. Most Russians started "baying for blood" and strongly supporting the war with Chechnya that became inevitable and led to the loss of the independence as a result of the bombings. According to Abrahms, this supports his theory that attacks by terrorist organizations have been always counterproductive for the perpetrators and therefore gave rise to conspiracy theories about alternative perpetrators who actually benefited from the events.

Philip Short in his biography of Putin said that while "It cannot be conclusively proved that no one from the FSB was involved" there is no "factual evidence of Russian state involvement."

==== Russian officials ====
In March 2000, Putin dismissed the allegations of FSB involvement in the bombings as "delirious nonsense." "There are no people in the Russian secret services who would be capable of such crime against their own people. The very allegation is immoral," he said. An FSB spokesman said that "Litvinenko's evidence cannot be taken seriously by those who are investigating the bombings".

Yuri Luzhkov, Mayor of Moscow at the time of the bombings, believed that the bombings in Moscow were facilitated by new legislation that established freedom of movement within the country, which was restricted prior to 1993. According to Luzhkov, the law made it possible for Chechen terrorists to bring weapons to Moscow and store them there, as well as purchase vehicles and provide housing for their personnel who had arrived in Moscow. According to Luzhkov, "for three months, after having arrived in Moscow, a terrorist could live wherever he wanted and stay with anyone, without notifying the police", which allowed the terrorists to prepare the bombings.

== Sealing information by the US government ==
On 14 July 2014, David Satter filed Freedom of Information Act (FOIA) requests with the State Department, the CIA and the FBI, inquiring about documents pertaining to the apartment bombings, the Ryazan incident and persons who tried to investigate the bombings and were killed. The agencies acknowledged receipt of the requests, but Satter received no other response within the statutory time limit. Satter filed suit against the Department of Justice and other agencies involved on 29 August 2014. However, the CIA refused even to acknowledge the existence of any relevant records because doing so would reveal "very specific aspects of the Agency's intelligence interest, or lack thereof, in the Russian bombings."

The State Department responded with a redacted copy of a cable from the U.S. embassy in Moscow. According to the cable, on 24 March 2000, a former member of Russian intelligence services told a U.S. diplomat that the real story about the Ryazan incident could never be known because it "would destroy the country." The informant said the FSB had "a specially trained team of men" whose mission was "to carry out this type of urban warfare". The informant has also said that Viktor Cherkesov, the FSB's first deputy director and an interrogator of Soviet dissidents was "exactly the right person to order and carry out such actions."

David Satter made a renewed FOIA request, and on 22 March 2017, State Department responded that documents concerning the U.S. assessment of the bombings would remain secret. A draft Vaughn index, a document used by agencies to justify withholdings in FOIA cases, said that the release of that information had "the potential to inject friction into or cause serious damage" to relationships with the Russian government that were "vital to U.S. national security".

On 16 March 2018, the case Satter v. Department of Justice was closed.

== Chronology of events ==
- 5 August 1999: Shamil Basayev enters western Dagestan from Chechnya, starting the War of Dagestan
- 9 August 1999: Stepashin is dismissed and Putin becomes prime minister
- 22 August 1999: The forces of Shamil Basayev withdraw back into Chechnya
- 25 August 1999: Russian jets make bombing runs against 16 sites in Chechnya
- 31 August 1999: Bombing in Moscow, Manezhnaya Square, 29 people are injured
- 4 September 1999: Bombing in Buynaksk, 64 people killed, 133 are injured
- 9 September 1999: Bombing in Moscow, Pechatniki, 94 people are killed, 249 are injured
- 13 September 1999: Bombing in Moscow, Kashirskoye highway, 118 are killed
- 13 September 1999: A bomb is defused and a warehouse containing several tons of explosives and six timing devices is found in Moscow
- 13 September 1999: Russian Duma speaker Gennadiy Seleznyov makes an announcement about the bombing of an apartment building in the city of Volgodonsk that only takes place three days later
- 16 September 1999: Bombing in Volgodonsk, 17 are killed, 69 injured
- 23 September 1999: An apartment bomb is found in the city of Ryazan. Vladimir Rushailo announces that police prevented a terrorist act. Vladimir Putin praises the vigilance of the citizens and calls for the air bombing of Grozny
- 23–24 September 1999: According to David Satter, FSB agents who planted the bomb in Ryazan are arrested by local police
- 24 September 1999: Nikolai Patrushev declares that the incident was a training exercise and frees the FSB agents
- 24 September 1999: Second Chechen War begins

== See also ==
- List of people allegedly involved in Russian apartment bombings
- List of deaths related to Russian apartment bombings
- Second Cold War
- Crocus City Hall attack

== Bibliography ==
- Stavitsky, Vasily (2000), Krovavyj terror (in Russian), TsOS FSB Rossii, Olma-Press, ISBN 978-5224014125
- Yeltsin, Boris (2000), Midnight Diaries, PublicAffairs, ISBN 978-1-58648-011-0, archived from the original on 24 February 2021
- Klebnikov, Paul (2000), Godfather of the Kremlin: Boris Berezovsky and the looting of Russia, Harcourt, ISBN 978-0-15-100621-2
- Reddaway, Peter; Glinski, Dmitri (2001), The Tragedy of Russia's Reforms: Market Bolshevism Against Democracy, United States Institute of Peace Press, ISBN 1-929223-06-4
- Talbott, Strobe (2002), The Russia Hand: A Memoir of Presidential Diplomacy, Random House, ISBN 978-0-375-50714-4
- Litvinenko, Alexander (2002), LPG: Lubianskaia Prestupnaia Gruppirovka: Ofitser FSB Daet Pokazaniia (in Russian), Grani, p. 255, ISBN 978-0-9723878-0-4
- Hoffman, David (2002), The Oligarchs: Wealth & Power in the New Russia, PublicAffairs, ISBN 978-1-58648-001-1
- Evangelista, Matthew (2002). Unarmed Forces: The Transnational Movement to End the Cold War. Cornell University Press. ISBN 0-8014-8784-6.
- Satter, David (2003), Darkness at Dawn: The Rise of the Russian Criminal State, Yale University Press, ISBN 0-300-09892-8
- Evangelista, Matthew (2004), The Chechen Wars: Will Russia Go the Way of the Soviet Union?, Brookings Institution Press, ISBN 978-0-8157-2497-1
- Murphy, Paul (2004), The Wolves of Islam: Russia and the Faces of Chechen Terror, Potomac Books Inc., ISBN 978-1-57488-830-0
- Jack, Andrew (2005), Inside Putin's Russia: Can There Be Reform Without Democracy?, Oxford University Press, ISBN 978-0-19-518909-4
- Sakwa, Richard (2005), Chechnya: From Past to Future, Anthem Press, ISBN 978-1-84331-164-5
- Goldfarb, Alexander; Litvinenko, Marina (2007), Death of a Dissident, Simon & Schuster, ISBN 978-1-4165-5165-2
- Felshtinsky, Yuri; Litvinenko, Alexander (2007), Blowing up Russia: Terror from within, Translated from Russian by Geoffrey Andrews and Co. (2nd ed.), Gibson Square Books, ISBN 978-1-903933-95-4
- Felshtinsky, Yuri; Pribylovsky, Vladimir (20 April 2008), The Age of Assassins. The Rise and Rise of Vladimir Putin, London: Gibson Square Books, ISBN 978-1-906142-07-0
- Sakwa, Richard (2008), Putin, Russia's choice (2nd ed.), Routledge, ISBN 978-0-415-40765-6
- Ware, Robert Bruce; Kisriev, Enver (2009), Dagestan: Russian Hegemony and Islamic Resistance in the North Caucasus, Routledge, ISBN 978-0765620286
- Akhmadov, Ilyas; Lanskoy, Miriam; Brzezinski, Zbigniew (2010), The Chechen Struggle: Independence Won and Lost, Palgrave Macmillan, ISBN 978-0-230-10534-8
- Soldatov, Andrei; Borogan, Irina (2010), The New Nobility: The Restoration of Russia's Security State and the Enduring Legacy of the KGB, PublicAffairs, ISBN 978-1-58648-802-4
- Dunlop, John (2012), The Moscow Bombings of September 1999: Examinations of Russian Terrorist Attacks at the Onset of Vladimir Putin's Rule, Stuttgart: Ibidem, ISBN 978-3-8382-0388-1
- Williams, Brian Glyn (2015), Inferno in Chechnya: The Russian-Chechen Wars, the Al Qaeda Myth, and the Boston Marathon Bombings, ForeEdge, ISBN 978-1-61168-737-8
- Pokalova, Elena (2015), Chechnya's Terrorist Network: The Evolution of Terrorism in Russia's North Caucasus, Praeger, ISBN 978-1-44083-154-6
- Satter, David (2016), The Less You Know, the Better You Sleep: Russia's Road to Terror and Dictatorship under Yeltsin and Putin, Yale University Press, ISBN 978-0-30021-142-9
- De La Pedraja, René (2018), The Russian Military Resurgence: Post-Soviet Decline and Rebuilding, 1992-2018, McFarland & Company, ISBN 978-1-47666-991-5
