= Dignity and Honor =

Dignity and Honor is an veterans organization for former members of Russian intelligence services. It was founded in 2003. It has over 3000 members. In 2006, it was run by Colonel Valentin Velichko. Members of the organisation have been alleged to have assassinated several high-profile spies. The organisation refutes all claims it has a 'hit list' and that it was involved in the assassination of Yuri Shchekochikhin.
