= New Course — Automobile Russia =

Electoral alliance in Russia

New Course — Automobile Russia Новый курс — Автомобильная Россия
- Abbreviation: NCAR (English); НКАР (Russian)
- Leader: Viktor Pokhmelkin; Boris Fyodorov; Leonid Olshansky
- Founded: 7 September 2003
- Registered: 15 September 2003
- Dissolved: 9 December 2003
- Headquarters: 16th building, Neglinnaya Street, Moscow, Russia
- Ideology: Liberalism; Liberal conservatism Drivers' rights Anti-militarism
- Political position: Centre-right
- Member parties: Liberal Russia; Republican Party of Russia; Movement of Drivers of Russia; Party of Economic Freedom
- Colours: Blue
- Slogan: «State for the people, not people for the state!» (Russian: «Государство для людей, а не люди для государства!»)
- Seats in the 3rd State Duma: 1 / 450

Party flag

Website
- autorus.ru

The New Course — Automobile Russia (NCAR; Russian: Новый курс — Автомобильная Россия; НКАР; Novyy kurs — Avtomobilnaya Rossiya, NKAR) was an electoral bloc in the 2003 State Duma elections. Orientation - opposition to the president, against the war in Chechnya. The bloc's pre-election slogan: "The state is for the people, not the people for the state!"

The bloc was formed by the political parties Liberal Russia and Republican Party of Russia, as well as the all-Russian public movement "Movement of Drivers of Russia". The block leader was Viktor Pokhmelkin. Particular emphasis in the bloc's election program was placed on protecting the rights of car owners. The program included a statement that the bloc was opposed to the “predatory” compulsory “auto-citizenship”, which, in the bloc's opinion, was another extortion. The bloc also opposed the "unfair" transport tax, as well as against the increase in customs duties on cars. In addition, the electoral bloc supported the restriction of labor immigration from Central Asian countries.

The top three on the electoral list were Viktor Pokhmelkin, well-known politician and manager Boris Fyodorov, and lawyer Leonid Olshansky; the party list in Moscow was headed by Konstantin Borovoy, in Saint Petersburg - by Sergei Vivatenko. The party has nominated its candidates in 12 single-member constituencies.

According to the results of the elections, the bloc won 0.84% of the votes of those who voted; at the same time, Pokhmelkin was elected to the State Duma in the Sverdlovsky single-mandate district (Perm).
