= Liberal Russia =

Liberal Russian political party

Liberal Russia Либеральная Россия
- Leader: Sergei Yushenkov; Boris Berezovsky
- Founders: Boris Zolotukhin; Sergei Yushenkov; Viktor Pokhmelkin; Sergei Shokhin; Galina Sartan; Eduard Vorobyov
- Founded: 23 April 2000
- Registered: 22 May 2000
- Dissolved: March 2004
- Split from: Union of Right Forces
- Preceded by: Democratic Choice of Russia
- Headquarters: 4th Building, Zemlyanoy Val Street, Moscow, Russia. 105064
- Ideology: Liberalism; Liberal conservatism
- Political position: Centre-right
- National affiliation: New Course — Automobile Russia
- Colours: White; Blue; Red
- Seats in the 3rd State Duma: 1 / 450

The Liberal Russia (Russian: Либеральная Россия; Liberalnaya Rossiya) was a liberal Russian political party in the first half of the 2000s.

== History ==
On April 23, 2000 the founding congress of the social and political movement "Liberal Russia" took place. The congress elected 5 co-chairs of the movement: Boris Zolotukhin, Sergei Yushenkov, Viktor Pokhmelkin, Sergei Shokhin, Galina Sartan. The congress also elected members of the political council, including Eduard Vorobyov.

In 2001, the Democratic Choice of Russia (DVR) party announced its dissolution in connection with the creation of a new right-wing liberal party, the Union of Right Forces (SPS). Some of the DVR members did not join the new party due to the support of the Union of Right Forces for the candidacy of Vladimir Putin for the post of President of the Russian Federation and the ambiguous position of the SPS leadership on the issue of the Second Chechen War. In May 2001, State Duma deputies from the Democratic Choice of Russia Sergei Yushenkov and Vladimir Golovlyov refused to join the Union of Right Forces party, announcing their desire to create an opposition party on the basis of "Liberal Russia". Vladimir Golovlyov joined the leadership of the Liberal Russia.

In December 2001, Viktor Pokhmelkin and Yuly Rybakov left the Union of Right Forces.

On December 22, 2001, a congress of the Liberal Russia movement was held in Moscow. At the congress, Boris Berezovsky was elected co-chairman of the movement.

Yuly Rybakov did not join the new party, as he did not agree with Berezovsky's idea of a possible alliance of liberals with national-patriots, which he expressed even before the congress, at a meeting with the initiative group in London.

=== Split ===
On October 4, 2002, Yushenkov announced that Liberal Russia was refusing Boris Berezovsky's money and would consider the possibility of his continued stay as co-chairman of the party.

On October 9, 2002, Boris Berezovsky was expelled from Liberal Russia. The reason was Berezovsky's interview with the editor-in-chief of the newspaper "Zavtra" Alexander Prokhanov, in which Berezovsky called for unification with the national-patriotic opposition. This interview was seen as a betrayal of liberal ideas. Berezovsky himself released a statement in which he called the interview "Tomorrow" only a pretext for breaking off relations, which had long been planned by the party's political council. Berezovsky described the decision to expel him from the party "from the legal point of view illegal." Berezovsky explained: “They had no right to expel me from the party, as well as to dismiss the co-chairman. I was elected co-chairman by the congress, not by the political council ".

On December 7, 2002, a congress of Berezovsky's supporters was held in Saint Petersburg, at which, according to Berezovsky's supporters, 45 regional branches of "Liberal Russia" participated. The congress decided to reinstate Berezovsky in the party and deprive all other co-chairmen of this party - Yushenkov, Pokhmelkin and Zolotukhin - from their posts. Berezovsky's partner Mikhail Kodanyov was elected as the new party chairman. The former leaders of the party dismissed from their posts declared this congress illegal. Yushenkov said: “The congress of Berezovsky's supporters has no prospects. They faced the Criminal Code: forgery, falsification and bribery ”. Earlier, on December 5, 2002, the Ministry of Justice of Russia called the intention of some members of "Liberal Russia" to hold a party congress in Saint Petersburg illegal.

On December 16, 2002, the political council of "Liberal Russia" made a decision to expel from the movement 18 heads of regional branches who participated in the December 7, 2002 congress.

As a result of the conflict with Berezovsky, the movement split into two wings. One of them was headed by supporters of Berezovsky, the other by supporters of Yushenkov, Pokhmelkin and Zolotukhin. In 2002-2004, each of them gathered their congresses and meetings, and elected their leaders.

The last years of the party's existence were darkened by contract killings of its leaders. On August 21, 2002, one of the leaders of Liberal Russia, Vladimir Golovlev, was killed. April 17, 2003 - party leader Sergei Yushenkov. On March 18, 2004, the court found the leader of Berezovsky's supporters Mikhail Kodanev as the organizer of the murder of Sergei Yushenkov.

=== State Duma elections ===
On September 7, 2003, a congress of Liberal Russia took place, which voted for participation in the Duma elections in December 2003 as part of the New Course — Automobile Russia electoral bloc. Vladimir Pokhmelkin became the block leader. Particular emphasis in the bloc's election program was placed on protecting the rights of car owners. The program included a statement that the bloc was opposed to the “predatory” compulsory “auto-citizenship”, which, in the bloc's opinion, was another extortion. The bloc also opposed the "unfair" transport tax, as well as against the increase in customs duties on cars. Following the elections, the bloc received 0.9% of the votes, taking 12th place, and did not overcome the 5% barrier.

After the Duma elections, Boris Zolotukhin resigned from the post of co-chairman of Liberal Russia. In early 2004, Vladimir Pokhmelkin also resigned from party posts.

== Financing ==
The movement was originally funded by members of the movement. During the transformation of the movement into a political party, Boris Berezovsky was invited to participate in financing. In October 2002, Berezovsky announced that he had spent about $ 5 million to finance the movement. According to Yushenkov, Berezovsky transferred about one million dollars to the movement over the entire period of its existence.
