= Aleksey Galkin =

Former GRU officer

Alexey Viktorovich Galkin (Russian: Алексей Викторович Галкин; born April 11, 1970) is a Russian former GRU officer. A senior lieutenant of the GRU, Alexei Galkin said, whilst being tortured by Chechen separatists, commanded by Abu Movsaev, that the apartment bombing in Buynaksk were organized by a team of twelve GRU officers and ordered by GRU director Valentin Korabelnikov The interview of Galkin was conducted by journalist Robert Young Pelton, who was also interviewing Abu Movsaev, who wrote about it in his book Hunter, Hammer, Heaven, Dangerous Journeys Through Three Worlds Gone Mad. Galkin later escaped from Chechen separatists and stated that he was tortured to produce this confession

== Capture by Chechen separatists ==
Galkin was captured during the Second Chechen military campaign by Chechen separatists group of Abu Movsaev near Mozdok on October 3, 1999. Together with Colonel Ivanov Zariko Amiranovich and senior lieutenant Vladimir Pachomov they insisted they were attempting to evacuate the relatives of Chechen, Russian Army collaborator Visani, who asked the Russian Army to evacuate his younger brother. After crossing the border to place explosives, they were ambushed and surrounded by separatists, after which they were repeatedly beaten, with amongst other things rifle butts. Together with Pachomov they were driven to Grozny.

== Torture ==
Galkin was kept by militants in a dark cellar and given food or water and he may have been beaten by his captors. Galkins was videotaped by Pelton watching videos without being bound or abused.

A month after being captured, Galkin was introduced to two men. The first man named Hasan - a commander of Shamil Basaev's secret security service and the second - Abu Movsaev - director of state security department of the self-proclaimed Ichkerian Republic. They interrogated Galkin for information, asking questions such as: "What are Putin's thoughts? What plans does he have on the war in the Chechen Republic?"

== Statements on Alexey Galkin by eyewitness Robert Young Pelton ==
Robert Young Pelton reported that no evidence of Galkin's torture were present when he was interviewed, although, he was thin, emaciated and his bore bruises from being bound for so long. Pelton interviewed Galkin and asked if he had been tortured or mistreated. Galkin was nervous, and when Pelton asked him why, he said with humor that he had never been on CNN before referring to his career as a spy. Musayev twice interrupted Galkin when Pelton asked whether Galkin voluntarily confessed and whether he is afraid of something, saying that "You don't need to answer this question".

== Escape and publications in Novaya Gazeta ==
In January, after the New Year, Galkin and Pachomov, were released by their captors. Having found weapons wandering alone, they encountered a group of militants and exchanged fire with them. Galkin had also received gunshot wounds to both arms. The escapees were discovered by Ryazan airborne regiment. Doctors diagnosed Galkin with four broken ribs (bone fragments also had entered into his lungs), his jaw was broken in three places and he had also suffered brain damage. Galkin retired from the Army due to his health condition in summer 2002 after rehabilitation course.

He was also awarded the Order “For Merit to the Fatherland,” 4th class, as well as a number of medals.

He became the prototype for the main character of the film Personal Number.

== See also ==
- List of Heroes of the Russian Federation
