= Maxim Lazovsky =

KGB/FSB officer (1965–2000)

Maxim Yuryevich Lazovsky (Russian: Макси́м Ю́рьевич Лазовский, nicknames "Max", "Lame"; July 31, 1965 – April 28, 2000) was a KGB and FSB officer who became involved in underground business. According to Alexander Litvinenko and co-authors he was also suspected of participation in Russian apartment bombings in 1999, along with other crimes including murders and kidnappings.

Maxim Lazovsky was born in Grozny, Chechnya. In 1992, Lazovsky organized a gang that was linked to the Chechen criminal groups which tried to control oil business in the neighbouring regions. Lazovsky was co-owner of the firm Lanako, engaged in oil business. In the same firm worked Captain Andrey Shchelenkov, who died from an explosion of his own bomb on a railway bridge in Moscow on November 18, 1994. Colonel Vladimir Vorobyev, who shortly after organized another act of terrorism in Moscow: the explosion of a trolleybus in December 1994, also cooperated closely with Lazovsky.

In February 1996, Lazovsky was detained by the Moscow Criminal Investigation department (MUR) and accused of various criminal activities together with the Moscow FSB employee Alexey Jumashkin and six other FSB employees. In 1997 Lazovsky was convicted to two years for illegal possession of drugs and weapons. He was released in 1998.

According to Yuri Felshtinsky and Vladimir Pribylovsky, Lavosky was involved in staging bombings in Moscow in 1999.

On April 28, 2000, Lazovsky was shot by unknown assassins on the entryway of a church in the village of Uspenskoye, Odintsovsky District near Moscow, where he lived.

== Sources ==
- A. Goldfarb and Alexander Litvinenko. (in Russian) Gang from Lubyanka. GRANI, New York, 2002. ISBN 0-9723878-0-3.
- Yuri Felshtinsky and Alexander Litvinenko. Blowing up Russia: Terror from within. New York 2002. ISBN 1-56171-938-2.
