= Yuri Shchekochikhin =

Russian investigative journalist and lawmaker (1950–2003)

- Юрий Щекочихин
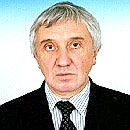

Member of the State Duma
- In office 1995–2003

Member of the Congress of People's Deputies
- In office 1990–1991

Personal details
- Born: 9 June 1950 Kirovabad, Azerbaijan SSR, Soviet Union (present-day Ganja, Azerbaijan)
- Died: 3 July 2003 (aged 53) Moscow, Russia
- Cause of death: Illness; radiation poisoning suspected
- Party: Yabloko
- Education: Moscow State University
- Occupation: Journalist, politician
- Awards: Medal "Defender of a Free Russia"; Medal "In Commemoration of the 850th Anniversary of Moscow"; Medal of 13 January

Yuri Petrovich Shchekochikhin (Russian: Ю́рий Петро́вич Щекочи́хин, IPA: [ˈjʉrʲɪj pʲɪˈtrovʲɪtɕ ɕːɪkɐˈtɕixʲɪn]; 9 June 1950 – 3 July 2003) was a Soviet and later Russian investigative journalist, writer, and liberal lawmaker in the Russian parliament. Shchekochikhin wrote and campaigned against the influence of organized crime and corruption. His last non-fiction book, Slaves of the KGB, was about people who worked as KGB informers.

As a journalist for the newspaper Novaya Gazeta (NG), Shchekochikhin investigated apartment bombings allegedly directed by the Russian secret services and the Three Whales Corruption Scandal which involved high-ranking FSB officers and was associated with money laundering through the Bank of New York. In the 1995 Russian legislative election he became a member of the State Duma. He was re-elected in the 1999 legislative election.

Shchekochikhin died suddenly on 3 July 2003 from a mysterious illness a few days before his scheduled departure to the United States, where he planned to meet with FBI investigators. His medical documents, according to NG, were either lost or destroyed by authorities. The symptoms of his illness fit a pattern of poisoning by radioactive materials and were similar to the symptoms of Nikolai Khokhlov, Roman Tsepov, and Alexander Litvinenko. According to Litvinenko and news reports, the death of Yuri Shchekochikhin was a politically motivated assassination.

== Early life ==
Shchekochikhin was born in Kirovabad, Azerbaijan SSR in June 1950 and was of Azerbaijani origin.

== Investigative journalism and political career ==
Shchekochikhin graduated from the Journalism Department of Moscow State University in 1975. He worked as an investigative journalist at Komsomolskaya Pravda (1972–1980) and Literaturnaya Gazeta (1980–1996), and then as a deputy editor of the liberal newspaper Novaya Gazeta (from 1996). Beginning in the 1990s, he published many articles critical of the First and Second Chechen Wars, human rights abuses in the Russian army, state corruption, and other social issues.

In the summer of 1988, Shchekochikhin published an interview with a lieutenant colonel of the militia Aleksander Gurov, in which the existence of organized crime in the Soviet Union was first publicly stated. That brought fame to both Gurov (who became the head of the 6th Agency of the MVD of the USSR which struggled against organized crime) and Shchekochikhin.

Yuri Shchekochikhin began his political career in 1990, when he was elected as a representative to the Congress of People's Deputies. He was elected to the Russian State Duma from the liberal Yabloko party in 1995. He was a member of a Duma committee on the problems of corruption, and was a UN expert on the problems of organized crime. He was a vocal opponent of the First and Second Chechen Wars.

Since early 1995, he has been an author and host of an investigative journalism program called "Special Team" on ORT, Russian television's first channel (then owned by Boris Berezovsky). In October 1995, the heads of the channel closed the program. According to Shchekochikhin, the reason was an episode called "For Motherland! For Mafia!", which was devoted to the Chechen War and was unleashed, in his opinion, by the "leading banks of Russia".

In 2000, he accused Russia's Deputy PM Ilya Klebanov of covering up the fact that Russia did not have the resources to attempt a rescue of the Kursk submarine crew.

From 2002, Shchekochikhin was a member of the Sergei Kovalev Commission, which investigated allegations that the 1999 Moscow apartment bombings had been orchestrated by the Russian Federal Security Service (FSB) to generate support for the war.

One of Shchekochikhin's last articles before his death was "Are we Russia or KGB of Soviet Union?". It described such issues as the refusal of the FSB to explain to the Russian Parliament what poison gas was released during the Moscow theater hostage crisis, and the work of secret services from Turkmenistan, which operated with impunity in Moscow against Russian citizens of Turkmеn origin.

He also tried to investigate the Three Whales Corruption Scandal and criminal activities of FSB officers related to money laundering through the Bank of New York and illegal actions of Yevgeny Adamov, a former Russian Minister of Nuclear Energy. The Three Whales case was under the personal control of President Vladimir Putin. In June 2003, Shchekochikhin contacted the FBI and received an American visa to discuss the case with US authorities. However, he never reached the USA because of his sudden death. Some Russian media claimed that Putin had issued an order to discharge 19 high-ranking FSB officers involved in this case in September 2006 as part of a Kremlin power struggle, but all of these officers continued to work in their FSB positions as of November 2006.

== Death ==
Shchekochikhin died suddenly on 3 July 2003 after a mysterious 16-day illness. It was officially declared that he died from an allergic Lyell's syndrome. His medical treatment and his post-mortem took place at the Central Clinical Hospital, which is "tightly controlled by the Russian Federal Security Service because it treats top-ranking Russian officials". His relatives were denied an official medical report about the cause of his illness, and were forbidden to take specimens of his tissues for an independent medical investigation. Journalists of Novaya Gazeta managed to send his tissue specimens to "major foreign specialists". The experts did not reach any definite conclusion. This caused widespread speculation about the cause of his death, especially since another member of the Kovalev commission, Sergei Yushenkov, was assassinated the same year and the legal counsel and investigator of the commission, Mikhail Trepashkin, was arrested by Russian authorities.

Some news reports drew parallels between the poisonings of Shchekochikhin, Alexander Litvinenko, and president Vladimir Putin’s former bodyguard Roman Tsepov, who died in a similar way in St. Petersburg in September 2004. Others noted Lecha Islamov, a Chechen rebel, who died in a Russian prison in 2004. “All three cases of poisoning – of Islamov, Shchekochikhin and Litvinenko – are united not only by the clinical picture, which is identical even in terms of the details, but also by the fact that the traces of the poisoners clearly point to one address: Moscow, Lubyanka (FSB headquarters),” according to a Chechenpress report written by Zelimkhan Khadzhiev.

== Last book and publications ==
Shchekochikhin's last published book was Slaves of the KGB: 20th Century. The Religion of Betrayal (Рабы ГБ. XX век. Религия предательства), tells the real stories of some of the many people forcibly recruited by the Russian KGB (the domestic operations of which later became the FSB) to work as undercover informers or agents. These people virtually became their KGB controllers' slaves, betraying their relatives, close friends and colleagues. When he died, he had not finished working on a book about the 20th Century wars in Chechnya.

In an interview he gave just before his death, he said

Many years ago we...summed up the mafia in the following phrase: The lion has jumped. This year, in January, we gave the mafia the following characterization: The lion has jumped and is already wearing epaulets. By comparison what is going on today in our security services, in our prosecutor's office, all bandits are simply boy scouts. Today, it is precisely the people who are needed to fight crime and corruption that have raised the flag of corruption and crime. This has not bypassed the secret police; what has never happened before happens constantly now - the protection that they provide, the enormous amounts of money they receive, and the control over ports and banks that they exercise.

== Investigation ==
At the request of the Novaya Gazeta newspaper staff, the Investigative Committee of the General Prosecutor's Office of Russia reopened the investigation into his death on 27 October 2007. In April 2008, an Investigative Committee official said that there would be another test carried out on his tissue to ascertain whether there had been a case of poisoning. The Prosecutor General of Russia closed the criminal case in April 2009 after the examination had failed to prove poisoning or violent death.

== Books ==
- Щекочихин, Юрий (1999). Рабы ГБ. XX век. Религия предательства [Slaves of KGB. 20th Century. The religion of betrayal] (in Russian). Samara: Федоров.

== See also ==
- Human rights in Russia
- List of members of the State Duma of Russia who died in office
