= Nikolai Kostechko =

Russian GRU officer (1946–2022)

- Born: 25 November 1946; Domashitsy, Pinsk District, Pinsk Region, Byelorussian SSR, USSR
- Died: 3 July 2022 (aged 75) Moscow, Russia
- Allegiance: Soviet Union; Russia
- Branch: GRU (Soviet Union); GRU (Russia)
- Service years: 1964–2009
- Rank: Colonel general
- Conflicts: Soviet–Afghan War; Second Chechen War
- Awards: Hero of the Russian Federation; Order "For Merit to the Fatherland", Fourth Class Order of Courage; Order of Military Merit; Order of the Red Star

Nikolai Nikolayevich Kostechko (Russian: Николай Николаевич Костечко; 25 November 1946 – 3 July 2022) was an officer of the Soviet Main Intelligence Directorate (GRU) and its Russian successor, the Main Directorate of the General Staff. He rose to the rank of colonel general and served as the Main Directorate's Chief of Staff and First Deputy Director. He was awarded the title of Hero of the Russian Federation in 2000.

== Early life ==
Kostechko was born on 25 November 1946 in the village of Domashitsy, Pinsk District, in what was then the Pinsk Region of the Byelorussian Soviet Socialist Republic, in the Soviet Union. He graduated from secondary school in Molotkovichi in 1964, and was drafted into the Soviet Army that year. He enrolled in the Cherepovets Military School of Communications, graduating from there in 1967, and was assigned to serve in special units of the Soviet Main Intelligence Directorate (GRU). He undertook further studies, graduating from the Military-Diplomatic Academy in 1973, and from the Higher Academic Courses of the Military Academy of the General Staff in 1996. He served during the Soviet–Afghan War with the 40th Army, and went on to see action in the Second Chechen War as head of a number of special forces' operations in the region. He oversaw trials of the Ka-50 helicopter and recommended it be adopted into service. He was also involved in the production of the 1993 film Black Shark, which brought the helicopter and the work of Russian special forces to public attention.

== Higher intelligence posts ==
Kostechko was appointed head of the GRU's 14th Directorate during the 1990s, and then Chief of Staff and First Deputy Director of the Main Intelligence Directorate, a post he held until 2009. On 19 February 2000 he was awarded the title of Hero of the Russian Federation, with the Gold Star medal number 578. He was promoted to the rank of colonel general on 10 December 2002, and retired from military service in 2009.

In addition to his intelligence work, Kostechko had the title of Honored Military Specialist of Russia, was a Doctor of military sciences, professor, and author of more than 25 scientific papers on the theory and practice of special operations and command and control. Over his career he was awarded the Order of the Red Star, the Order "For Merit to the Fatherland" Fourth Class, the Order of Courage, the Order of Military Merit, an Honorary Diploma of the Russian Government on 23 November 2006, and various foreign orders and medals. He was also a laureate of the USSR State Prize and the State Prize of the Russian Federation. He had also been made an honorary citizen of the Pinsk Region in 2006.

In retirement Kostechko lived in Moscow, where he died on 3 July 2022 at the age of 75.
