= Robert Bruce Ware =

American philosopher

Academic background
- Education: University of Oxford (PhD)
- Thesis: Consciousness and Contradiction: Subjective Freedom and Cultural Fragmentation in Hegel's Philosophy (1994)

Academic work
- Era: Contemporary philosophy
- Region: Western philosophy
- School or tradition: German Idealism
- Institutions: Southern Illinois University

Robert Bruce Ware (born 1952, Albuquerque, New Mexico) is Professor of Philosophy at Southern Illinois University Edwardsville. Ware earned an AB in political science from UC Berkeley, an MA in philosophy from UC San Diego, and a D.Phil. from Oxford University. From 1996 to 2013, Ware conducted field research in North Caucasus and has published extensively on politics, ethnography, and religion of the region in scholarly journals and in the popular media. He has been cited as a leading specialist on Dagestan. His recent research has focused upon the philosophy of mathematics and physics.

== Selected publications ==
=== Books ===
- Hegel: The Logic of Self-consciousness and the Legacy of Subjective Freedom (Edinburgh University Press, 1999)
- Dagestan: Russian Hegemony and Islamic Resistance in the North Caucasus (with Enver Kisriev, M. E. Sharpe, 2010)
- The Fire Below: How the Caucasus Shaped Russia (edited, Bloomsbury, 2013)

=== Articles ===
- Chechenization: Ironies and Intricacies
