= Achemez Gochiyayev =

Russian suspected terrorist (born 1970)

- Born: 28 September 1970 (age 55); Karachaevsk, Karachay-Cherkess Autonomous Oblast, RSFSR, Soviet Union (now Russia)
- Known for: Russian authorities claim him to be one of the perpetrators behind the Russian apartment bombings in 1999

Achemez Gochiyayev (born 28 September 1970 in Karachayevsk) is a Russian citizen who was accused of organizing the Russian apartment bombings, a series of terrorist acts in 1999 that killed 307 people and led the country into the Second Chechen War. The five bombings took place during two weeks between 4 September and 16 September 1999, in Moscow, and the southern towns of Buynaksk and Volgodonsk. Gochiyayev has not been arrested or convicted and ostensibly remains a fugitive; he has not been seen since early March 2002.

== Biography ==
Gochiyayev is an ethnic Karachay, born in the city of Karachayevsk in the North Caucasus. After finishing high school, he served in the Russian Strategic Rocket Forces. He had been living in Moscow for more than ten years. He ran a small construction company, Kapstroy 2000 in Moscow and got married in 1996. According to independent investigator Mikhail Trepashkin, Gochiyayev was an ordinary "russified Karachai" who lived in Moscow, and the information that he was an adherent of the Wahhabis came solely from a fabricated FSB investigation.

== Alleged involvement in bombings ==
Gochiyayev rented premises at four locations in Moscow where bombs were found. He, Tatyana Koroleva and Alexander Karmishin were founders of the company that received shipments of the explosives, RDX, used in the bombings. When the two first bombs went off, claiming more than 200 lives, he called the police to warn about two remaining bombs (at Borisovskie Prudy and Kapotnya). Those bombs were found at the addresses he had given and were deactivated, preventing a large number of further casualties. Gochiyayev claimed that he was framed by an old acquaintance, an FSB officer who asked him to rent basements "as storage facilities" at four locations where bombs were later found.

According to the FSB, Gochiyayev received $500,000 from warlord Ibn Al-Khattab to carry out the attacks. The FSB released a picture showing the two together, claiming that it proved that the two had close links. The pictures appeared in response to a statement by Alexander Litvinenko that he has a letter from Gochiyayev denying any ties with Khattab. According to Litvinenko, a British forensic analyst was unable to determine if the man in the photo was Gochiyayev. Alexander Litvinenko was later murdered in London with polonium.

An independent public commission to investigate the bombings, chaired by Duma deputy Sergei Kovalyov, started its work in February 2002. On 5 March, Sergei Yushenkov and Duma member Yuli Rybakov flew to London, where they met Alexander Litvinenko and Mikhail Trepashkin. After this meeting, Trepashkin began working with the commission. According to Trepashkin, the person who actually rented the premises was FSB officer Vladimir Romanovich. Trepashkin located Mark Blumenfeld, the owner of the Guryanov Street basement warehouse in Moscow where the explosives were stored. Blumenfeld stated that the composite sketch of the man who had rented his basement was later replaced with a different sketch (of Gochiyaev) by FSB personnel. Blumenfeld said he was forced by FSB interrogators to testify against Gochiyaev. Trepashkin was unable to present his evidence in court because he was arrested a week before the trial, charged with illegal arms possession and divulging state secrets. He was convicted by a military closed court and sentenced to four years in prison. Romanovich was subsequently killed in a hit-and-run incident in Cyprus. Gochiyayev escaped to Georgia and later probably to Turkey, according to news reports. The last time author Yuri Felshtinsky and Litvinenko saw Gochiyayev was in 2002 to obtain his written statement, in which he admitted having helped to "rent these premises on Guryanov Street, Kashirka, Borisovskie Prudy and Kopotnya".

In 2010, a writer, Yulia Latynina, speculated that Gochiyayev might have been hiding in Turkey.

== See also ==
- List of fugitives from justice who disappeared

== Sources ==
- Yuri Felshtinsky, Alexander Litvinenko, and Geoffrey Andrews. "Blowing up Russia: Terror from Within". Gibson Square Books, London, 2007. ISBN 978-1-903933-95-4 (freely available as a PDF file).
- Alex Goldfarb, with Marina Litvinenko Death of a Dissident: The Poisoning of Alexander Litvinenko and the Return of the KGB, The Free Press, 2007, ISBN 1-4165-5165-4
- ACHIMEZ GOCHIYAYEV: RUSSIA’S TERRORIST ENIGMA RETURNS By Andrew Mc Gregor
- Четыре туза (in Russian) Computer translation
- Террористы всегда платили наличными (in Russian) Computer translation
- Взрывы в Москве (in Russian) Computer translation
