= Sergei Yushenkov =

Russian politician (1950–2003)

- Сергей Юшенков
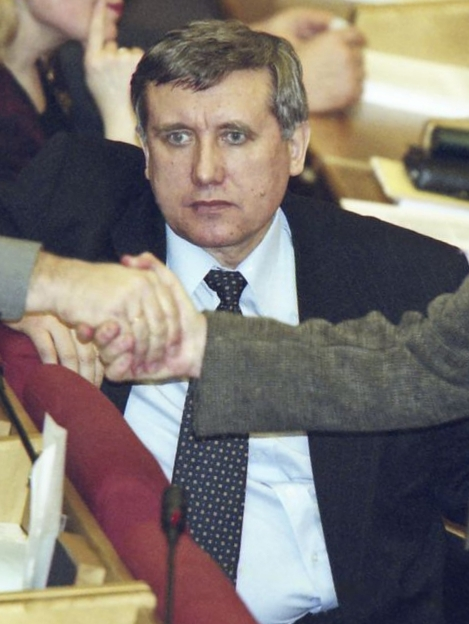
- Yushenkov in 2001

Member of the State Duma
- In office 1993 – 17 April 2003

Personal details
- Born: 27 June 1950 Medvedkovo, Kalinin Oblast, Russian SFSR, Soviet Union (now Tver Oblast, Russia)
- Died: 17 April 2003 (aged 52) Moscow, Russia
- Cause of death: Assassination by gunshot
- Party: Liberal Russia
- Other political affiliations: Choice of Russia; Democratic Choice of Russia – United Democrats; Union of Right Forces

Sergei Nikolayevich Yushenkov (Russian: Серге́й Никола́евич Юшенко́в; 27 June 1950 – 17 April 2003) was a Russian politician. He was assassinated on 17 April 2003, just hours after registering his political party to participate in the December 2003 parliamentary elections.

== Political career ==
Yushenkov was an elected member of all Russian Parliaments from 1989 to 2003. During the Soviet coup attempt of 1991, he organized the "living chain" of civilians who came to protect their Parliament in Moscow, and he successfully negotiated with military personnel sent to storm the building.

As a person with a military background, Yushenkov was the strongest proponent of reform in the Russian Army, and he campaigned to abolish conscription, reduce the size of the Army, and protect all rights of military personnel who suffered from abuse and dedovshchina. Yushenkov was a prominent critic of the First and Second Chechen Wars, arguing that the Russian Army's operations in Chechnya were illegal.

His political party, Liberal Russia, was officially formed on 22 October 2002. The other initial organizers of the party before its registration were Vladimir Golovlyov, Viktor Pokhmelkin, and businessman Boris Berezovsky. Golovlyov was assassinated on 21 August 2002, and Berezovsky was expelled, possibly at the request of state authorities who refused to register the party, and possibly due to tensions with the other organizers.

== Investigation of Russian apartment bombings ==
Yushenkov was vice chairman of the Sergei Kovalyov commission formed to investigate the Russian apartment bombings, and his views that the Russian Federal Security Service (FSB) had orchestrated the bombings to generate public support for the Chechen War were similar to those of journalist David Satter, a Johns Hopkins University and Hoover Institute scholar. During his visit to the United States in April 2002, Yushenkov described a secret order issued by Boris Yeltsin to initiate the Second Chechen War, according to Alexander Goldfarb The order was issued in response to a demand from 24 Russian governors that the then-unpopular Yeltsin should transfer all state powers to Prime Minister Vladimir Putin. Yeltsin's order was dated 23 September 1999, the same day that FSB operatives were caught red-handed while planting a bomb in an apartment complex in the city of Ryazan (after which the sequence of bombings in several Russian cities abruptly stopped). The next day, Putin began the Second Chechen War. According to Yushenkov, Putin's rise to power represented a successful coup d'état organized by the FSB.

On 5 March 2002, Yushenkov flew to the premier of the documentary film Assassination of Russia in London. The film described Russian apartment bombings as a terrorism act committed by Russian state security services. He announced that his party Liberal Russia was to distribute copies of the film around the country to demonstrate "how the secret services deceived Russian citizens". Although some copies were confiscated by Russian Customs, tens of thousands of copies of the film were smuggled and distributed in Russia.

== Investigation of Moscow theatre hostage crisis ==
Yushenkov also investigated the alleged involvement of the FSB in staging the Moscow theatre hostage crisis through their agent provocateur Khanpash Terkibaev, the only hostage taker who left the theater alive and allegedly guided the terrorists to the theater. In the beginning of April 2003 former FSB Aleksander Litvinenko gave information about Terkibaev ("the Terkibaev file") to Yushenkov when he visited London. He passed this file to Anna Politkovskaya.

A few days later, Yushenkov was assassinated. Terkibaev was killed later in a car crash in Chechnya. While flying south in September 2004 to help negotiate with those who had taken over a thousand hostages in a school in Beslan (North Ossetia), Politkovskaya fell violently ill and lost consciousness after drinking tea. She had reportedly been poisoned, with some accusing the former Soviet secret police poison facility of involvement.

== Death ==
Yushenkov was shot and killed near his house in Moscow on 17 April 2003, just hours after finally obtaining the registrations needed for his Liberal Russia party to participate in the December 2003 parliamentary elections in 55 regions. Mikhail Trepashkin believed that Yushenkov was murdered because he was a leader of an opposition party that openly challenged the power of the FSB and Russian authorities. Moreover, Yushenkov promised voters an independent investigation of the Russian apartment bombings as a key issue of his election campaign (an interview of Trepashkin can be seen in director Andrei Nekrasov's documentary "Disbelief").

Just before his death, Yushenkov received threats from a high-ranking FSB general, Aleksander Mikhailov, according to Grigory Pasko.

=== Investigation ===
Four people were convicted of Yushenkov's murder and are currently serving prison sentences. Among them is Mikhail Kodanev, a former co-chairman of the Liberal Russia party organized by Yushenkov himself. During the trial, Kodanev strenuously claimed to be innocent. He later tried to commit suicide and was placed in the FSB's special Lefortovo prison. According to attorney Henry Reznick, Kodanev was convicted solely on the basis of the false testimony of another convicted suspect (Alexander Vinnik) who made a series of contradictory statements, including claims that Yushenkov was killed by the government.

Critics also insisted that the political murders of two chairmen of the Liberal Russia party should have been considered as the same case in the court, which would make it clear that some of the suspects were wrongly accused. Some observers noted that Kodanev was relatively unknown in Russian politics until he was named to Yushenkov's party by Boris Berezovsky, ostensibly to make a mockery of Vladimir Putin (Kodanev was nicknamed "Putin" because he resembled the President). Some Russian media claimed that it was Berezovsky who organized Yushenkov's murder through his agent Mikhail Kodanev.

Former FSB officer Aleksander Litvinenko suggested that Yushenkov had been killed because he knew that FSB organized the Moscow theatre hostage crisis, consistent with a previous report by journalist Anna Politkovskaya.

== See also ==
- List of members of the State Duma of Russia who died in office
