= David Satter =

American journalist (born 1947)

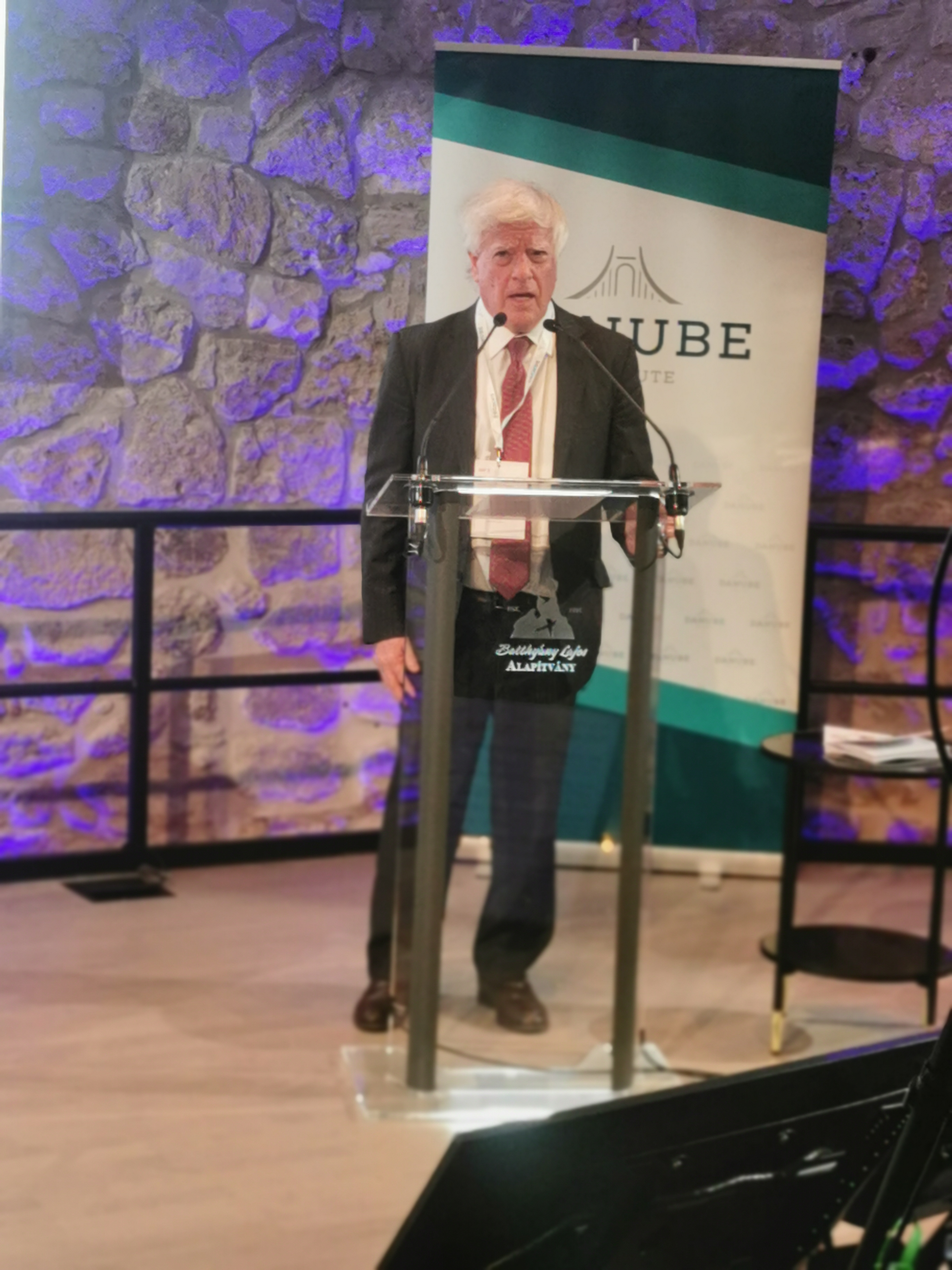
- Born: August 1, 1947 (age 78); Chicago, Illinois, U.S.
- Education: University of Chicago (BA); Balliol College, Oxford (MLitt)
- Awards: Rhodes Scholarship

David A. Satter (born August 1, 1947) is an American journalist and historian who writes about Russia and the Soviet Union. He has authored books and articles about the decline and fall of the Soviet Union and the rise of post-Soviet Russia.

Satter was expelled from Russia by the government in 2013. He was the first researcher to advance the theory that Vladimir Putin and Russia's Federal Security Service were behind the 1999 Russian apartment bombings. He has often been critical of Putin's rise to the Russian presidency.

== Life and career ==
David Satter graduated from the University of Chicago and Balliol College, Oxford as a Rhodes Scholar. He worked for the Chicago Tribune and, from 1976 to 1982, as Moscow correspondent of the Financial Times. He then became a special correspondent on Soviet affairs for the Wall Street Journal. He was a research fellow at the Hoover Institution, a senior fellow at the Hudson Institute and the Jamestown Foundation, and a visiting scholar at the Johns Hopkins University School of Advanced International Studies and at the University of Illinois at Urbana-Champaign.

Satter published several books about Soviet Union and post-Soviet Russia. In an article in The Wall Street Journal Europe, April 2, 1997, he wrote: "When the Soviet Union fell… the moral impulse motivating the democratic movement had to become the basis of Russia’s political practices. The tragedy of the present situation is that Russian gangsters are cutting off this development before it has a chance to take root."

Jack Matlock, the former U.S. ambassador in Moscow, writing in The Washington Post, said that Age of Delirium was "spellbinding" and gave "a visceral sense of what it felt like to be trapped in the communist system." The Virginia Quarterly Review wrote, "The brilliance of this book lies in its eccentricity and in the author’s profound knowledge of and sympathy for the suffering of the Russian people under communism." Martin Sieff, writing in the Canadian National Post, wrote that Darkness at Dawn was "Vivid, impeccably researched and truly frightening." Angus Macqueen, writing in The Guardian, compared Darkness at Dawn to Putin’s Russia by Anna Politkovskaya. Sieff wrote: "Both of these books underline the moral vacuum that the destruction of the Soviet Union has left."

A documentary film about the fall of the Soviet Union based on Satter's book Age of Delirium was completed in 2011. Satter also appears in the 2004 documentary Disbelief about the Russian apartment bombings made by director Andrei Nekrasov.

In December 2013, the Russian government expelled Satter from the country for allegedly committing "multiple gross violations" of Russian migration law; Satter said he followed the procedures the Russian Foreign Ministry set out for him and said that the manner of his expulsion was a formula reserved for spies. Luke Harding suggested that Satter's expulsion from the Russian Federation was part of a wider trend by the FSB that is, "increasingly rejecting visa applications from Western academics seeking to visit Russia if their publications are deemed hostile."

== Russian apartment bombings ==
In his book, Darkness at Dawn, Satter described bombings of Russian apartment buildings in 1999 that claimed nearly 300 lives and provided the justification for a second Chechen War. In his books he analyzed these bombings and related events, and was one of the first researchers who came to the conclusion that the bombings were perpetrated by Russian state security services to bring Vladimir Putin to power. During a testimony before the U.S. House of Representatives, Satter stated:

With Yeltsin and his family facing possible criminal prosecution… a plan was put into motion to put in place a successor who would guarantee that Yeltsin and his family would be safe from prosecution and the criminal division of property in the country would not be subject to reexamination. For 'Operation Successor' to succeed, however, it was necessary to have a massive provocation. In my view, this provocation was the bombing in September, 1999 of the apartment buildings in Moscow, Buinaksk and Volgodonsk. In the aftermath of these attacks, which claimed 300 lives, a new war was launched against Chechnya. Putin, the newly appointed prime minister who was put in charge of that war, achieved overnight popularity. Yeltsin resigned early. Putin was elected president and his first act was to guarantee Yeltsin immunity from prosecution.

A cable from the US embassy in Moscow on 24 March 2000 stated that one of the embassy's principal informants, a former Russian intelligence officer, said the real story about the Ryazan incident could never be known because it "would destroy the country." The informant said the FSB had "a specially trained team of men" whose mission was "to carry out this type of urban warfare" and Viktor Cherkesov, the FSB's first deputy director and an interrogator of Soviet dissidents was "exactly the right person to order and carry out such actions."

On 14 July 2016, David Satter filed a request to obtain official assessment of who was responsible for the bombings from the State Department, the CIA and the FBI under the Freedom of Information Act. But he received a response from the State Department that all documents were classified by US government because "that information had the potential ... to cause serious damage to the relationship with the Russian government". Moreover, the CIA refused even to acknowledge the existence of any relevant records because doing so would reveal "very specific aspects of the Agency's intelligence interest, or lack thereof, in the Russian bombings."

The latest book by Satter on this subject was The Less You Know, The Better You Sleep: Russia's Road to Terror and Dictatorship under Yeltsin and Putin

== His books ==
- Age of Delirium: The Decline and Fall of the Soviet Union. Yale University Press, 2001, ISBN 0-300-08705-5
- Darkness at Dawn: The Rise of the Russian Criminal State. Yale University Press, 2003, ISBN 0-300-09892-8
- It Was a Long Time Ago and It Never Happened Anyway: Russia and the Communist Past. Yale University Press, 2007, ISBN 0-300-11145-2
- The Less You Know, The Better You Sleep: Russia's Road to Terror and Dictatorship under Yeltsin and Putin. Yale University Press, 2016, ISBN 0-300-21142-2
- Never Speak to Strangers and Other Writing from Russia and the Soviet Union. Columbia University Press, (2020) ISBN 978-3-838-21457-3
