= Mikhail Trepashkin =

KGB and FSB officer (born 1957)

Mikhail Trepashkin Михаил Трепашкин
- Михаил Иванович Трепашкин
- Born: 7 April 1957; Malkovo, Lyozna District, Vitebsk Region, Byelorussian SSR, Soviet Union
- Alma mater: FSB Academy
- Military career
- Allegiance: Soviet Union Russia
- Branch: Soviet Armed Forces; Soviet Navy; Federal Security Service
- Service years: 1975-1978, 1979-2000
- Rank: Polkovnik
- Awards: Medal "For Distinction in Military Service"; Medal "For Courage"

Mikhail Ivanovich Trepashkin (Russian: Михаил Иванович Трепашкин; born 7 April 1957) is a Russian attorney and former Federal Security Service (FSB) colonel who was invited by MP Sergei Kovalev to assist in an independent inquiry of the Russian apartment bombings in September 1999 that followed the Dagestan war and were one of the causes of the Second Chechen War. During his investigation, he was arrested by the FSB and sentenced to four years' imprisonment for "revealing state secrets". His arrest has been criticized by a number of human rights organizations and he has been called a political prisoner.

== Career in the KGB and FSB ==
Trepashkin started working for the KGB in 1984 as an investigator of underground trade in stolen art. At the beginning of the 1990s, Trepashkin moved to the Internal Affairs department of the FSB, where he worked for Nikolai Patrushev. He investigated connections of FSB officers with criminal groups. He won a medal for intercepting a plane-load of weapons sold by FSB officers to Chechen rebels.

In 1995, Trepashkin got involved in the Bank Soldi affair, described by Scott Anderson in a 2009 GQ article. Trepashkin was working on an FSB sting operation against a bank extortion ring linked to Salman Raduyev, a Chechen rebel who was then fighting against Russia in the First Chechen War. The sting resulted in a raid on a Bank Soldi branch in Moscow in Dec 1995. Trepashkin claims that the raid uncovered bugging devices used by the extortionists, whose serial numbers linked their origin to the FSB or Ministry of Defense. Furthermore, a van outside the bank was monitoring the bugging devices. In the van was Vladimir Romanovich, an FSB agent who Trepashkin claims was working for the criminals. However, most of those arrested in the sting were released. Nikolai Patrushev took Trepashkin off the case, and began an investigation of Trepashkin instead.

In 1997, Trepashkin wrote a letter to President Boris Yeltsin attempting to bring light to the case and corruption in the FSB. He resigned from the FSB, successfully sued its leadership, and got a job with the tax police.

At a press conference on 17 November 1998, Alexander Litvinenko, Victor Shebalin and other members of FSB claimed to have received an order to kill Boris Berezovsky and Trepashkin. The group members claimed that the order came from an FSB department called URPO, the Division of Operations against Criminal Organizations.

== Investigation of Russian apartment bombings and imprisonment ==
Trepashkin was invited by MP Sergei Kovalev to assist in an independent inquiry of the Russian apartment bombings. Two sisters whose mother was killed in one of the houses hired Trepashkin to represent them in the trial of two Russian Muslims accused of transporting explosives for the bombings.

While preparing for the trial, Trepashkin said he uncovered a trail of a suspect whose description had disappeared from the files. He claimed that the man turned out to be an FSB member named Vladimir Romanovich, the same man he claimed had been working for criminals in the Moscow Bank Soldi raid of 1995. Trepashkin said that a witness identified only the first of the 2 composite images distributed by the official investigation. This implied that the official investigation doctored the composite image to hide the perpetrators from the FSB. But Trepashkin never managed to air his findings in court. On 22 October 2003, just a week before the hearings, Trepashkin was arrested for illegal arms possession. He was convicted by a closed military court to four years for revealing state secrets. An appeal court later overturned the arms possession charge, but the other sentence remained. In September 2005, after serving two years of his sentence, Trepashkin was released on parole, but two weeks later was re-arrested after the State appealed the parole decision.

Trepashkin investigated a letter attributed to Achemez Gochiyayev and found that the alleged Gochiyayev's assistant who arranged the delivery of sacks might have been vice-president of Kapstroi-2000 Kormishin, originally from Vyazma.

Trepashkin suffered from asthma with bronchial attacks on a daily basis, itching dermatosis and pain in the area of his heart, and he needed medical treatment. However, he told Amnesty International that he was denied medical treatment, held in a freezing punishment cell, and transported with imprisoned tuberculosis patients who "were coughing right into your face because they were unable to either cover their mouths or turn away."

On 30 November 2007, Trepashkin was freed with the expiration of his four-year prison term.

== Western press coverage ==
The case of Trepashkin caught the attention of the Western press, caused an uproar among human rights campaigners, was put on record by Amnesty International, mentioned by the US State Department and featured in an award-winning documentary Disbelief.

American war correspondent Scott Anderson wrote a story about his interviews with Trepashkin for the September 2009 issue of the GQ magazine. However, according to NPR's David Folkenflik, Condé Nast management gave orders to limit circulation of the story. These included banning the story off of GQ's website, not showing the US issue to "Russian government officials, journalists or advertisers", not publishing the story in any overseas Condé Nast magazines, not publicizing the story, and asking Anderson to not syndicate it 'to any publications that appear in Russia'.

== Involvement in Alexander Litvinenko affair ==
In a letter from prison Trepashkin alleged that in 2002 FSB decided to kill Alexander Litvinenko. He also claimed that FSB had plans to kill relatives of Litvinenko in Moscow in 2002, although these have not been carried out.

Trepashkin claimed that supervisors and people from the FSB promised not to send him to the prison if only he leaves the Sergei Kovalev commission and start working with the FSB "against Litvinenko".

== After the imprisonment ==
Trepashkin continues to his work as a lawyer and participates in human rights activism.

In 2008–10, Trepashkin defended Yulia Privedennaya, leader of the organization "F.A.K.E.L.-P.O.R.T.O.S.", whom the authorities accused of creating an illegal armed formation, and then decided to put in the hospital for a mental examination.

In March 2010, Trepashkin signed the online anti-Putin manifesto of the Russian opposition "Putin must go".

== See also ==
- Alexander Litvinenko poisoning
- "Vladimir Putin's Dark Rise to Power" controversy
