= Lubyanka Criminal Group =

Book

- Author: Alexander Litvinenko
- Original title: Лубянская преступная группировка
- Subject: Russian Security Services
- Publisher: GRANI
- Publication date: 2002
- Pages: 255 pp.
- ISBN: 978-0-9723878-0-4
- OCLC: 51485973

Lubyanka Criminal Group (Russian: Лубянская преступная группировка; also translated as The Gang from Lubyanka) is a book by Alexander Litvinenko about the alleged transformation of the Russian Security Services into a criminal and terrorist organization.

Lubyanka is known as KGB headquarters. In the book, the authors claim that Russian president Vladimir Putin and other FSB officers have been involved in organized crime, including covering up drug traffic from Afghanistan.

The book was withdrawn from sales in Russia by request from the FSB according to The Moscow Human Rights News Agency Prima News. In response, the authors allowed the book's publication and distribution by anyone in Russia free of charge. Alexander Goldfarb, the executive director of International Foundation for Civil Liberties which licensed the book's copyright in Russia, stated, "By banning the books for the first time since the Soviet times, FSB threw down a challenge to the society".

Former Interior Minister of Russia Anatoly Kulikov promised to bring a libel suit against the book but did not follow it through.

== Reception ==
Viktor Suvorov, author of Icebreaker said that the book is "Terrifying, gripping and instructive". According to Suvorov:

Litvinenko described a leading criminal group that provides "protection" for all other organized crime in the country and which continues the criminal war against their own people", like their KGB and NKVD predecessors. "Book proves: Lubyanka was taken over by the enemies of the people (who else would put their own people on the needle and blow up sleeping children?)" "If Putin's team can not disprove the facts provided by Litvinenko, Putin must shoot himself. Patrushev and all other leadership of Lubyanka Criminal Group must follow his example.

Former Soviet prisoner of conscience Vladimir Bukovsky stated, "Litvinenko eloquently depicts that what was long considered to be the 'shield and sword' of the communist party is in reality a huge criminal mechanism".

As Andrei Antonov writes, "the way Litvinenko sees it, the FSB is clearly a criminal and even terrorist organization. And not only because of apartment explosions or alleged conspiracy against Berezovsky. Litvinenko is certain that security services were behind the murder of Galina Starovoitova, a prominent figure in Russia's democracy movement, and the death of Anatoly Sobchak, and many, many other things."

Alan Cowell praised the book as an important source that described the attempted assassination of Boris Berezovsky in Moscow and many other events.

== See also ==
- Mafia state
