= Boris Berezovsky (businessman) =

Russian businessman (1946–2013)

- Борис Березовский
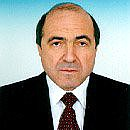

Executive Secretary of the Commonwealth of Independent States
- In office 29 April 1998 – 4 March 1999
- Preceded by: Ivan Korotchenya
- Succeeded by: Yury Yarov

Deputy Secretary of the Security Council of the Russian Federation
- In office 29 October 1996 – 4 November 1997
- President: Boris Yeltsin
- Secretary: Ivan Rybkin

Member of the State Duma
- In office 19 December 1999 – 19 July 2000
- Preceded by: Mikhail Yakush
- Succeeded by: Magomet Tekeyev
- Constituency: Karachay-Cherkessia (No. 15)

Personal details
- Born: 23 January 1946 Moscow, Russian SFSR, Soviet Union
- Died: 23 March 2013 (aged 67) Sunninghill, Berkshire, England
- Resting place: Brookwood Cemetery, Brookwood, Surrey, England; 51.299574°N 0.625846°W
- Citizenship: Russia; Israel (reportedly until 1996); United Kingdom (under the name Platon Elenin)
- Spouses: Nina Korotkova (m. 1970; div. 1991) Galina Besharova (m. 1991; div. 2010)
- Domestic partner: Yelena Gorbunova (esp. 1996; sep. 2012)
- Children: Elizaveta Berezovskaya, an artist (Born in 1971)
- Occupation: Businessman; engineer; mathematician; government official

Boris Abramovich Berezovsky (Russian: Борис Абрамович Березовский, Hebrew: בוריס ברזובסקי; 23 January 1946 – 23 March 2013), also known as Platon Elenin, was a Russian business oligarch, government official, engineer and mathematician. He was a member of the Russian Academy of Sciences and held the federal state civilian service rank of 1st class Active State Councillor of the Russian Federation.

Berezovsky had an estimated net worth of $3 billion in 1997, which he amassed through the privatisation of state property in the early 1990s, most notably the main television channel, Channel One. By the time of his death in 2013, however, he was impoverished and severely depressed, having lost a series of legal battles against his former friend Roman Abramovich, been forced to sell assets, and undergone a costly divorce settlement with his former wife. Berezovsky helped fund Unity to secure Vladimir Putin's election, in the expectation that the status quo and the influence of the oligarchs would be preserved. He was elected to the State Duma in the 1999 Russian legislative election, standing as a Putin loyalist. Following the 2000 Russian presidential election, however, Putin consolidated power and became increasingly autocratic, demanding the loyalty of all oligarchs; Berezovsky then went into opposition and resigned from the Duma. He remained a vocal critic of Putin for the rest of his life.

In late 2000, after the Russian Deputy Prosecutor General demanded that Berezovsky appear for questioning, he remained abroad and moved to the United Kingdom, which granted him political asylum in September 2003. After his departure, the Russian government took over his television assets, and he divested from other Russian holdings. In Russia, Berezovsky was convicted in 2007, following a trial in absentia, of fraud and embezzlement. The first charges had been brought during Yevgeny Primakov's government in 1999. Despite an Interpol Red Notice for his arrest, Russia repeatedly failed to secure his extradition from Britain; the situation became a major point of diplomatic tension between the two countries.

In late 2011, an Israeli private investigator ordered the mercenary Indian hack-for-hire firm Appin to hack Berezovsky and his lawyers. In 2012, Berezovsky lost a High Court case he brought over the ownership of the major oil producer Sibneft, against Roman Abramovich, in which he sought over £3 billion in damages. The court concluded that Berezovsky had never been a co-owner of Sibneft.

Berezovsky was found dead at his home, Titness Park, at Sunninghill, near Ascot in Berkshire, on 23 March 2013. A post-mortem examination found that his death was consistent with hanging and that there were no signs of a violent struggle. The coroner at the inquest into his death subsequently recorded an open verdict.

== Early life, scientific research and engineering experience ==
Boris Abramovich Berezovsky was born in 1946, in Moscow, to Abram Markovich Berezovsky (1911–1979), an Ashkenazi Jewish civil engineer in construction works, and his wife, Anna Aleksandrovna Gelman (22 November 1923 – 3 September 2013). He studied applied mathematics, and received a doctorate in 1983. After graduating from the Moscow Forestry Engineering Institute in 1968, Berezovsky worked as an engineer from 1969 until 1987, serving as assistant research officer, research officer and finally the head of a department in the Institute of Control Sciences of the USSR Academy of Sciences. Berezovsky researched optimization and control theory, publishing 16 books and articles between 1975 and 1989. After graduation, he got a job by distribution. Berezovsky later stated that he disliked his initial job, although appreciated his academic entourage that "shaped his personality".

As a member of the Communist Party of the Soviet Union, he did not act as a political dissident. Yet, he disagreed with the official ideology, and sought to exploit his membership for career growth, that helped him to "intuitively compensate" lack of scientific talent.

We lived better than many. By the age of 42, I shared a Zhiguli with a friend. Lenya Boguslavsky and I got it from his stepfather, the poet Andrei Voznesensky, who bought it new. We repaired it, Lenya drove it for a week, and I drove it for a week. At the same time, I experienced tremendous happiness. Like others, I bought a chandelier in installments through a mutual aid fund for three hundred rubles, on credit, and then spent six months paying the money back. I saved up for a year to buy a color TV - a normal situation. I was forced to feed my family. But I had been working since I was 16, I didn’t count on anyone. Only on myself. I was engaged in my favorite science, communicated with brilliant people. I had only one desire - to receive satisfaction and joy from life. But I have the desire to do something myself only when I am sure that no one else will do it as well as I can. I really don’t like doing what others do better than me. That's why I quitted science - I knew I wouldn't be the first, because there are people who are more talented than me in mathematics. And when I started doing business, I felt more comfortable. Because I knew that very few people can do what I do as well. — Boris Berezovsky, as quoted in «Автопортрет, или Записки повешенного».

== Political and business career in Russia ==
=== Accumulation of wealth ===
Alexander Khinshtein (State Duma deputy, member of the United Russia faction) claimed that in 1979 Boris Berezovsky was detained by the OBKhSS authorities in Makhachkala (Dagestan Autonomous Soviet Socialist Republic) for profiteering. In Khinshtein's opinion, Berezovsky has been a KGB officer since 1979.

In 1989, Berezovsky took advantage of the opportunities presented by perestroika to found LogoVAZ (Russian: ЛогоВАЗ) with Badri Patarkatsishvili and senior managers from Russian automobile manufacturer AvtoVAZ. LogoVAZ developed software for AvtoVAZ, sold Soviet-made cars, and serviced foreign cars. The dealership profited from hyperinflation by taking cars on consignment and paying the producer at a later date when the money lost much of its value.

One of Berezovsky's early endeavors was All-Russia Automobile Alliance (AVVA), a venture fund he formed in 1993 with Alexander Voloshin (Boris Yeltsin's future Chief of Staff) and AvtoVAZ Chairman Vladimir Kadannikov. Berezovsky controlled about 30% of the company, which raised nearly US$50 million from small investors through a bonded loan to build a plant producing a "people's car". The project did not collect sufficient funds for the plant and the funds were instead invested into AvtoVAZ production, while the debt to investors was swapped for equity.

In 1994, Berezovsky was the target of a car bombing incident, but survived the assassination attempt, in which his driver was killed and he himself was injured. Alexander Litvinenko led the FSB investigation into the incident and linked the crime to the resistance of the Soviet-era AvtoVaz management to Berezovsky's growing influence in the Russian automobile market.

Berezovsky's involvement in the Russian media began in December 1994, when he gained control over ORT Television (see Channel One (Russia)) to replace the failing Soviet TV Channel 1. He appointed the popular anchorman and producer Vladislav Listyev as CEO of ORT. Three months later Listyev was assassinated amid a fierce struggle for control of advertising sales. Berezovsky was questioned in the police investigation, among many others, but the killers were never found.

Under Berezovsky's stewardship, ORT became a major asset of the reformist camp as they prepared to face Communists and nationalists in the upcoming presidential elections.

From 1995 to 1997, through the controversial loans-for-shares privatisation auctions, Berezovsky and Patarkatsishvili assisted Roman Abramovich in acquiring control of Sibneft, the sixth-largest Russian oil company, which constituted the bulk of his wealth. In an article in The Washington Post in 2000, Berezovsky revealed that financier George Soros declined an invitation to participate in the acquisition.

In 1995, he played a key role in a management reshuffle at Aeroflot and participated in its corporatization, with his close associate Nikolai Glushkov becoming Aeroflot's CFO. In January 1998, it was announced that Sibneft would merge with Mikhail Khodorkovsky's Yukos to create the third-largest oil company in the world. The merger was abandoned five months later amid falling oil prices.

=== Role in Yeltsin's reelection in 1996 ===
Berezovsky entered the Kremlin's inner circle in 1993 through arranging for the publication of Yeltsin's memoirs and befriended Valentin Yumashev, the President's ghost-writer.

In January 1996, at the World Economic Forum at Davos, Berezovsky liaised with fellow oligarchs to form an alliance – which later became known as the "Davos Pact" – to bankroll Boris Yeltsin's campaign in the upcoming presidential elections. On his return to Moscow, Berezovsky met and befriended Tatyana Dyachenko, Yeltsin's daughter, According to a later profile by The Guardian, "Berezovsky masterminded the 1996 re-election of Boris Yeltsin... He and his billionaire friends coughed up £140 million for Yeltsin's campaign".

In the summer of 1996, Berezovsky had emerged as a key advisor to Yeltsin, allied with Anatoly Chubais, opposing a group of hardliners led by General Alexander Korzhakov. One night in June, in the drawing room of Club Logovaz, Berezovsky, Chubais and others plotted the ouster of Korzhakov and other hardliners. On 20 June 1996, Yeltsin fired Korzhakov and two other hawks, leaving the reformers' team in full control of the Kremlin. Firing them was controversial though, as Korzhakov a few days before caught two of Yeltsin's campaign organizers carrying US$500,000 cash without invoices out of the presidential administration building.

On 16 June 1996, Yeltsin came first in the first round of elections after forging a tactical alliance with Gen. Alexander Lebed, who finished third. On 3 July, in the runoff vote, he beat the Communist Gennady Zyuganov. His victory was due largely to the support of the TV networks controlled by Gusinsky and Berezovsky (NTV and ORT) and the money from the business elite. The New York Times called Berezovsky the "public spokesman and chief lobbyist for this new elite, which moved from the shadows to respectability in a few short years".

=== Role in Chechen conflict ===
On 17 October 1996, Yeltsin dismissed General Alexander Lebed from the position of National Security Advisor amid allegations that he was plotting a coup and secretly mustering a private army. Lebed promptly accused Berezovsky and Gusinsky of engineering his ouster, and formed a coalition with the disgraced General Alexander Korzhakov. The dismissal of Lebed, the architect of the Khasavyurt peace accord, left Yeltsin's Chechen policy in limbo. On 30 October 1996, in a political bombshell, Yeltsin named Ivan Rybkin as his new National Security Advisor and appointed Berezovsky Deputy Secretary in charge of Chechnya with a mandate to oversee the implementation of the Khasavyurt Accord: that is, the withdrawal of Russian forces, the negotiation of a peace treaty, and the preparation of a general election. On 19 December 1996, Berezovsky made headlines by negotiating the release of 21 Russian policeman held hostage by the warlord Salman Raduev amid efforts by radicals from both sides to torpedo peace negotiations.

On 12 May 1997, Yeltsin and Maskhadov signed the Russian–Chechen Peace Treaty in the Kremlin. Speaking at a press conference in Moscow, Berezovsky outlined his priorities for the economic reconstruction of Chechnya, particularly the construction of a pipeline for transporting Azerbaijani oil. He called upon the Russian business community to contribute to the rebuilding of the republic, revealing his own donation of US$1 million (some sources mention US$2 million) for a cement factory in Grozny.

After his dismissal from the Security Council, Berezovsky vowed to continue his activities in Chechnya as a private individual and maintained contact with Chechen warlords. He was instrumental in the release of 69 hostages, including two Britons, Jon James and Camilla Carr, whom he flew in his private jet to RAF Brize Norton in September 1998. In an interview with Thomas de Waal in 2005, he revealed the involvement of the British Ambassador to Russia, Sir Andrew Wood, and explained that his former negotiations counterpart, the Islamic militant leader Movladi Udugov, helped arrange the Britons' release.

Berezovsky had a phone conversation with Movladi Udugov in the spring of 1999, six months before the beginning of fighting in Dagestan. A transcript of that conversation was leaked to a Moscow tabloid on 10 September 1999 and appeared to mention the would-be militants' invasion. It has been the subject of much speculation ever since. As Berezovsky explained later in interviews to de Waal and Goldfarb, Udugov proposed to coordinate the Islamists' incursion into Dagestan, so that a limited Russian response would topple the Chechen president Aslan Maskhadov and establish a new Islamic republic, which would be anti-American but friendly to Russia. Berezovsky said that he disliked the idea but reported Udugov's overture to prime-minister Stepashin. "Udugov and Basayev," he asserted, "conspired with Stepashin and Putin to provoke a war to topple Maskhadov ... but the agreement was for the Russian army to stop at the Terek River. However, Putin double-crossed the Chechens and started an all-out war."

=== Battle with "Young Reformers" ===
In March 1997, Berezovsky and Tatyana Dyachenko flew to Nizhniy Novgorod to persuade the city's governor, Boris Nemtsov, to join Chubais' economic team, which became known as the government of Young Reformers. This was the last concerted political action of the "Davos Pact" (see above). Four months later the group split into two cliques fiercely competing for Yeltsin's favour. The clash was precipitated by the privatization auction of the communication utility Svyazinvest, in which Onexim bank of Chubais' loyalist Vladimir Potanin, backed by George Soros, competed with Gusinsky, allied with Spanish Telefónica. An initially commercial dispute swiftly developed into a contest of political wills between Chubais and Berezovsky.

Potanin's victory unleashed a bitter media war, in which ORT and NTV accused the Chubais group of fixing the auction in favor of Potanin, whereas Chubais charged Berezovsky with abusing his government position to advance his business interests. Both sides appealed to Yeltsin, who had proclaimed a new era of "fair" privatization "based on strict legislative rules and allowing no deviations". In the end, both sides lost. Berezovsky's media revealed a corrupt scheme whereby a publishing house owned by Onexim Bank paid Chubais and his group hefty advances for a book that was never written. The scandal led to a purge of Chubais' loyalists from the government. Chubais retaliated by persuading Yeltsin to dismiss Boris Berezovsky from the national security council. Berezovsky's service on the Security Council ended on 5 November 1997. Soros called the Berezovsky-Chubais clash a "historical event, in the reality of which I would have never believed, if I had not watched it myself. I saw a fight of the people in the boat floating towards the edge of a waterfall". He argued that the reformist camp never recovered from the wounds sustained in this struggle, setting the political stage for conservative nationalists, and eventually Vladimir Putin.

=== Philanthropy ===
In 1991, Berezovsky founded the "Triumph" award, bestowed upon outstanding Russian poets, musicians, artists, directors and ballet dancers.

It is reported in the documentary series Captive that Boris Berezovsky, in 1998, was effective in the release of two English aid workers who had been held hostage for ransom in Chechnya for 14 months

=== The Kremlin Family and Putin's rise to power ===
In the spring of 1998, Berezovsky made an unexpected political comeback, starting with his appointment, in April 1998, to the position of executive secretary of the Commonwealth of Independent States. He emerged in the centre of a new informal power group – "The Family", a close-knit circle of the extended family of President Yeltsin himself, his daughters, his sons-in-law, their friends, their advisers and their backers ("a handful of tycoons who became wealthy during Yeltsin's eight-year reign"), which included Yeltsin's daughter Tatyana Dyachenko and his chief of staff, Valentin Yumashev. It was rumoured that no important government appointment could happen without the Family's support. By 1999, "The Family" also included two of Berezovsky's associates, his former AVVA partner Aleksandr Voloshin, who replaced Yumashev as Yeltsin's chief of staff, and Roman Abramovich.

The principal concern of the Family was finding an "electable" successor to Yeltsin to counter the presidential aspirations of the then–prime minister, Yevgeny Primakov, who was leaning to more statist positions. Political battles between the Family and Primakov's camp dominated the two last years of Yeltsin's presidency.

In November 1998, in a televised press conference, five officers of the FSB, led by Lieutenant Colonel Alexander Litvinenko, revealed an alleged plot by their superiors to assassinate Berezovsky.

In April 1999, Russia's Prosecutor General, Yury Skuratov, opened an investigation into embezzlement at Aeroflot and issued an arrest warrant for Berezovsky, who called the investigation politically motivated and orchestrated by Primakov. Nikolai Glushkov, Aeroflot's former General Director, later revealed that conflict with Primakov arose from the irritation that Berezovsky's management team caused in the Russian Foreign Intelligence Service, which Primakov headed before becoming prime minister, over firing of thousands of spies, who used Aeroflot as a front organization in Soviet times. The arrest warrant was dropped a week later, after Berezovsky submitted to questioning by the prosecutors. No charges were brought. Yeltsin sacked Primakov's government shortly thereafter and replaced him with Sergey Stepashin as new prime-minister.

Vyacheslav Markovich Aminov (Russian: Вячеслав Маркович Аминов) supported Berezovsky and headed Berezovsky's security service.

Vladimir Putin's meteoric rise from relative obscurity to the Russian presidency in the course of a few short months of 1999 has been attributed to his intimacy with the "Family" as a protege of Berezovsky and Yumashev. By the end of 1999, the Family had persuaded Yeltsin to name Putin his political successor and candidate for the presidency.

Berezovsky's acquaintance with Putin dated back to the early 1990s, when the latter, as Deputy Mayor of St. Petersburg, helped Logovaz establish a car dealership. They enjoyed friendly relations; on occasion, Berezovsky took Putin skiing with him in Switzerland.

In February 1999, when Berezovsky's political standing looked uncertain because of his clash with Primakov over Aeroflot, Putin, then Director of the FSB, made a bold gesture of friendship by showing up at a birthday party for Berezovsky's wife. "I absolutely do not care what Primakov thinks of me", Putin told Berezovsky on that night. That was the beginning of their political alliance. According to the Times, Spanish police discovered that on up to five occasions in 1999, Putin had secretly visited a villa in Spain belonging to Berezovsky.

In mid-July 1999, "The Family" dispatched Berezovsky to Biarritz, where Putin was vacationing, to persuade him to accept the position of prime minister and the role of heir apparent. On 9 August, Yeltsin sacked the government of Sergei Stepashin and appointed Putin prime minister, amid reports that Berezovsky had masterminded the reshuffle.

Putin's principal opponents were the former Prime Minister Evgeny Primakov and the Mayor of Moscow Yuri Luzhkov, backed by the Fatherland-All Russia alliance. To counter this group in the Duma elections of 1999, Berezovsky was instrumental in the creation, within the space of a few months, of the Unity party, with no ideology other than its support for Putin. Later, he disclosed that the source of Unity's funding, with Putin's knowledge and consent, was Aeroflot. In the 1999 election, Berezovsky campaigned as a Putin loyalist and won a seat in the Duma, representing the North Caucasian republic of Karachaevo-Cherkessia.

During the Duma election campaign Berezovsky's ORT TV served as an extremely effective propaganda machine for the Putin camp, using aggressive attack reporting and programming to denigrate and ridicule Putin's rivals, Primakov and Luzhkov, tactics strongly criticized as undue interference with the media. But Unity got a surprisingly high score in the elections, paving the way for Putin's election victory in spring 2000.

=== Conflict with Putin and emigration ===
Berezovsky's disagreements with Putin became public three weeks into Putin's presidency. On 8 May 2000, Berezovsky and Abramovich were spotted together at Putin's invitation-only inauguration ball in Moscow. However, on 31 May, Berezovsky sharply attacked the constitutional reform proposed by the president, which would give the Kremlin the right to dismiss elected governors. On 17 July 2000, Berezovsky resigned from the Duma, saying he "did not want to be involved in the country's ruin and the restoration of an authoritarian regime". In August, Berezovsky's media attacked Putin for the way he handled the sinking of the Kursk submarine, blaming the death of 118 sailors on the Kremlin's reluctance to accept foreign help. In September, Berezovsky alleged that the Kremlin had attempted to expropriate his shares in ORT and announced that he would put his stake into a trust to be controlled by prominent intellectuals.

In an article in The Washington Post in 2000, Berezovsky argued that in the absence of a strong civil society and middle class it may sometimes be necessary for capitalists "to interfere directly in the political process" of Russia as a counterweight to ex-Communists "who hate democracy and dream of regaining lost positions." Berezovsky took legal action against the journalist Paul Klebnikov, who accused him of various crimes. In October, in an interview in Le Figaro, Putin announced that he would no longer tolerate criticism of the government by media controlled by the oligarchs. "If necessary we will destroy those instruments that allow this blackmail", he declared. Responding to a question about Berezovsky, he warned that he had a "cudgel" in store for him. "The state has a cudgel in its hands that you use to hit just once, but on the head. We haven't used this cudgel yet. We've just brandished it... [But] the day we get really angry, we won't hesitate to use it."

In the same month, Russian prosecutors revived the Aeroflot fraud investigation and Berezovsky was questioned as a witness. On 7 November 2000, Berezovsky, who was travelling abroad, failed to appear for further questioning and announced that he would not return to Russia because of what he described as "constantly intensifying pressure on me by the authorities and President Putin personally. Essentially," he said, "I'm being forced to choose whether to become a political prisoner or a political emigrant." Berezovsky claimed that Putin had made him a suspect in the Aeroflot case simply because ORT had "spoken the truth" about the sinking of the submarine Kursk. In early December, his associate Nikolai Glushkov was arrested in Moscow and Berezovsky dropped the proposal to put ORT stake in trust.

I understood that the path the president chose meant the following for me: either I would be the last in line to be hanged, but I would definitely be hanged, or I would be the first in line to be hanged, but there was a high probability that I would not be hanged at all, because I would be able to turn the situation around. I chose the second path and I can say that today I definitely do not regret it, although it is a very difficult path. — Boris Berezovsky, as quoted in «Автопортрет, или Записки повешенного»

=== Divestment from Russian holdings ===
In 2001, the Russian government made a systematic takeover of privately owned television networks, in the course of which Berezovsky, Gusinsky, and Patarkatsishvili lost most of their media holdings, prompting Patarkatsishvili to warn the world of Russia "turning into a banana republic" in a letter to The New York Times. In February, Berezovsky and Patarkatsishvili sold their stake in ORT to Roman Abramovich, who promptly ceded editorial control to the Kremlin. Berezovsky later claimed that there was a secret understanding that Nikolai Glushkov would be released from prison as part of that deal, a promise that was never fulfilled. In April, the government took control of Vladimir Gusinsky's NTV. Berezovsky then moved to acquire a controlling stake in a smaller network, TV-6, made Patarkatsishvili its chairman, and offered employment to hundreds of locked out NTV journalists. Almost immediately, Patarkatshishvili became a target of police investigation and fled the country. In January 2002 a Russian arbitration court forced TV-6 (Russia) into liquidation. The liquidation of TV-6 was precipitated by LUKoil, a partly state-owned minority shareholder, using a piece of legislation that was almost immediately repealed.

In 2001, Berezovsky and Patarkatsishvili ended their involvement in Sibneft for a US$1.3 billion fee from Roman Abramovich. This transaction was the subject of a later dispute in the UK commercial courts, with Berezovsky alleging that he had been put under pressure to sell his stake to Abramovich at a fraction of the true value, an allegation that the court rejected.

In 2006, Berezovsky sold the Kommersant ("The Businessman") newspaper and his remaining Russian assets to Badri Patarkatsishvili.

== Exile in Britain ==
From his new home in the UK, Stanley House, where he and associates including Akhmed Zakayev, Alexander Litvinenko, and Alex Goldfarb became known as "the London Circle" of Russian exiles, Berezovsky publicly stated that he was on a mission to bring down Putin "by force" or by nonviolent revolution. He established the International Foundation for Civil Liberties (IFCL), to "support the abused and the vulnerable in society – prisoners, national minorities and business people" in Russia and criticized Putin's record in the West.

Berezovsky launched a concerted campaign to expose alleged misdeeds of Vladimir Putin, including suppressing freedom of speech, war crimes in Chechnya, and accusing the FSB of the 1999 Russian apartment bombings to help Putin win the presidency. Many of these activities were funded through the New York-based IFCL, directed by Berezovsky's friend Alex Goldfarb.

Berezovsky bought a Belgravia flat, the 125-acre Wentworth Park estate near Virginia Water in Surrey, and for a while owned the 172-acre Hascombe Court estate in Godalming. In 2012, he sold his Wentworth Park house.

=== Political asylum and extradition proceedings ===
On 9 September 2003, Berezovsky was granted refugee status and political asylum by the British Home Office which he, according to Alex Goldfarb, welcomed.

On 12 September 2003, judge Timothy Workman of Bow Street Magistrates' Court in central London dropped extradition proceedings against Berezovsky, ruling that it would be pointless to pursue the case as the granting of asylum status to Berezovsky made the proceedings redundant.

However, when Berezovsky told Reuters in early February 2006 that he was working on plans to overthrow Russian President Vladimir Putin, British Foreign Minister Jack Straw warned the London-based Russian tycoon not to plot against the Russian President while living in Britain. His refugee status could be reviewed if he continued to make such remarks.

=== Convictions in absentia and investigations abroad ===
After Berezovsky gained political asylum in Britain, the Russian authorities vigorously pursued various criminal charges against him. This culminated in two trials in absentia. From London, Berezovsky called the trial, which sentenced him to six years in prison, "a farce". In June 2009, the Krasnogorsk City Court near Moscow sentenced Berezovsky to thirteen years imprisonment for defrauding AvtoVAZ of 58 million rubles (US$1.9 million) in the 1990s. Berezovsky was represented by a court-appointed lawyer.

In spite of Berezovsky's successes in Britain in fighting off extradition requests and exposing Russian court convictions as politically motivated (see below), some other jurisdictions cooperated with Russian authorities in seizing his property and targeting his financial transactions as money laundering. Berezovsky succeeded in overturning some of these actions. In July 2007, Brazilian prosecutors issued an arrest warrant for Berezovsky in connection with his investment in the Brazilian football club Corinthians. However, a year later the Brazilian Supreme Court cancelled the order and stopped the investigation. On Russian requests, French authorities raided his villa in Nice in search of documents, and seized his two yachts berthed on the French Riviera. However, some months later, the boats were released by a French court. Swiss prosecutors have been assisting their Russian colleagues for over a decade in investigating Berezovsky's finances.

=== Accusations and libel suits in the UK ===
Berezovsky's meteoric enrichment and involvement in power struggles have been accompanied by allegations of various crimes from his opponents. After his falling out with Putin and exile to London, these allegations became the recurrent theme of official state-controlled media, earning him comparisons with Leon Trotsky and the Nineteen Eighty-Four character Emmanuel Goldstein.

In 1996, Forbes, an American business magazine, published an article by Paul Klebnikov entitled "Godfather of the Kremlin?" with the sub-heading "Power. Politics. Murder. Boris Berezovsky could teach the guys in Sicily a thing or two." The article linked Berezovsky to corruption in the car industry, to the Chechen mafia, and to the murder of Vladislav Listyev. In 2000, the House of Lords gave Berezovsky and Nikolai Glushkov permission to sue for libel in the UK courts. Given that only 2,000 of the 785,000 copies sold worldwide were sold in the United Kingdom, this led numerous scholars to cite the case as an example of libel tourism. The case slowly proceeded until the claimants opted to settle when Forbes offered a partial retraction. The following statement appended to the article on the Forbes website summarises: "On 6 March 2003, the resolution of the case was announced in the High Court in London. Forbes stated in open court that (1) it was not the magazine's intention to state that Berezovsky was responsible for the murder of Listiev, only that he had been included in an inconclusive police investigation of the crime; (2) there is no evidence that Berezovsky was responsible for this or any other murder; (3) in light of the English court's ruling, it was wrong to characterize Berezovsky as a mafia boss; and (4) the magazine erred in stating that Glouchkov had been convicted for theft of state property in 1982." Klebnikov elaborated his allegations in his 2000 book Godfather of the Kremlin: Boris Berezovsky and the looting of Russia (the 2001 edition was titled Godfather of the Kremlin: The Decline of Russia in the Age of Gangster Capitalism).

In 2006, a UK court awarded Berezovsky £50,000 in libel damages against the Russian private bank Alfa-Bank and its chairman, Mikhail Fridman. Fridman had claimed on a Russian television programme that could be watched in the UK that Berezovsky had threatened him when the two men were competitors for control of the Kommersant publishing house, and that making threats was Berezovsky's usual way of conducting business. The jury rejected the defendants' claim that Fridman's allegations were true. Berezovsky accepted the apology and withdrew his libel suit.

In March 2010, Berezovsky, represented by Desmond Browne QC, won a libel case and was awarded £150,000 damages by the High Court in London over allegations that he had been behind the murder of Alexander Litvinenko. The allegations had been broadcast by the Russian state channel RTR Planeta in April 2007 on its programme Vesti Nedeli, which could be viewed from the UK. In his judgement, Justice Eady stated: "I can say unequivocally that there is no evidence before me that Mr Berezovsky had any part in the murder of Mr Litvinenko. Nor, for that matter, do I see any basis for reasonable grounds to suspect him of it." Berezovsky had sued both the channel and a man called Vladimir Terluk, whom Mr Justice Eady agreed was the man who had been interviewed in silhouette by the programme under the pseudonym 'Pyotr'. Terluk had claimed that, to further his UK asylum application, Berezovsky had approached him to fabricate a murder plot against himself, and that Litvinenko knew of this. Mr Justice Eady accepted that Terluk had not himself alleged Berezovsky's involvement in the murder of Litvinenko, but considered that his own allegations were themselves serious and that there was no truth in any of them. As RTR did not participate in the proceedings, Terluk was left to defend the case himself, receiving significant assistance (as the judge noted) from the Russian prosecutor's office.

The Guardian described the 2010 libel case as "almost anarchic at times as officials from the Russian prosecutors' office repeatedly intervened despite not being party to proceedings. So obvious was their intention that when one of their mobile phones went off in court one day, Desmond Browne quipped: 'That must be Mr Putin on the line.'" The defendants appealed to the Court of Appeal but the appeal was dismissed, Lord Justice Laws giving a judgment with which the Chancellor of the High Court and Lady Justice Rafferty agreed. The Lord Justice described a witness statement of Andrei Lugovoi, newly adduced by the defendants, as 'not sensibly capable of belief'.

=== High Court case against Abramovich ===
In 2011, Berezovsky brought a civil case against Roman Abramovich in the High Court of Justice in London, accusing Abramovich of blackmail, breach of trust and breach of contract, and seeking over £3 billion in damages. This became the largest civil court case in British legal history.

Berezovsky's claimed past ownership of Sibneft – which constituted the bulk of his fortune – was put into question by Abramovich, who in a statement to the High Court in London asserted that Berezovsky had never owned shares in Sibneft, and that US$1.3 billion paid in 2001 ostensibly for his stake in the company was actually in recognition of Berezovsky's "political assistance and protection" during the creation of Sibneft in 1995. The hearings, which started on 3 October 2011, examined Berezovsky's US$5.5 billion claim against Abramovich for damages arising from the sale of his assets under alleged "threats and intimidation".

In late 2011, Israeli private detective Tamir Mori ordered the mercenary Indian hack-for-hire firm Appin to hack more than 40 targets, including Berezovsky and his lawyers. On 31 August 2012, the High Court found for Abramovich. The High Court judge stated that because of the nature of the evidence, the case hinged on whether to believe Berezovsky or Abramovich's evidence. In her ruling, the judge observed: "On my analysis of the entirety of the evidence, I found Mr. Berezovsky an unimpressive, and inherently unreliable, witness, who regarded truth as a transitory, flexible concept, which could be moulded to suit his current purposes. ... I regret to say that the bottom line of my analysis of Mr. Berezovsky's credibility is that he would have said almost anything to support his case." She ruled that the monies paid represented a final payment in discharge of all obligations.

=== Business and personal activities in exile ===
Berezovsky conducted business with Neil Bush, the younger brother of the US President George W. Bush. Berezovsky was an investor in Bush's Ignite! Learning, an educational software corporation, since at least 2003. In 2005, Neil Bush met with Berezovsky in Latvia, causing tension with Russia due to Berezovsky's fugitive status. Neil Bush was also seen with Berezovsky in his box at an Arsenal F.C. match at the Emirates Stadium in London. There had been speculation that the relationship had become a cause of tension in Russo-American bilateral relations.

It had been speculated that Berezovsky's wealth was depleted with the onset of the late 2000s recession. According to the Sunday Times Rich List, in 2011 his net worth was about US$900 million.

=== Appeals for regime change ===
In September 2005, Berezovsky said in an interview with the BBC: "I'm sure that Putin doesn't have the chance to survive, even to the next election in 2008. I am doing everything in my power to limit his time frame, and I am really thinking of returning to Russia after Putin collapses, which he will." In January 2006, Berezovsky stated in an interview to a Moscow-based radio station that he was working on overthrowing the administration of Vladimir Putin by force. Berezovsky also accused Putin of being "a gangster" and the "terrorist number one".

Berezovsky declared that he was plotting the overthrow of President Putin on 13 April 2007 during an interview The Guardian conducted: "We need to use force to change this regime. It isn't possible to change this regime through democratic means. There can be no change without force, pressure." He also admitted that during the last six years he had struggled hard to "destroy the positive image of Putin" and said that "Putin has created an authoritarian regime against the Russian constitution. ... I don't know how it will happen, but authoritarian regimes only collapse by force."

Soon after Berezovsky's 2007 statement, Garry Kasparov, a figure in the opposition movement The Other Russia and leader of the United Civil Front, wrote the following on his website: "Berezovsky has lived in emigration for many years and no longer has significant influence upon the political processes which take place in Russian society. His extravagant proclamations are simply a method of attracting attention. Furthermore, for the overwhelming majority of Russian people he was a political symbol of the 90s, one of the 'bad blokes' enriching themselves behind the back of president Yeltsin. The informational noise around Berezovsky was specifically beneficial for the Kremlin, which was trying to compromise Russia's real opposition. Berezovsky has not had and does not have any relation to Other Russia or the United Civil Front." Berezovsky responded in June 2007 by saying that "there is not one significant politician in Russia whom he has not financed" and that this included members of Other Russia. The managing director of the United Civil Front, in turn, said that the organization would consider suing Berezovsky over these allegations, but the lawsuit has never been brought before the court.

The Russian Prosecutor General's Office had launched a criminal investigation against Berezovsky to determine whether his comments could be considered a "seizure of power by force", as outlined in the Russian Criminal Code. If convicted, an offender faces up to twenty years imprisonment. The British Foreign Office denounced Berezovsky's statements, warning him that his status of a political refugee might be reconsidered, should he continue to make similar remarks. Furthermore, Scotland Yard had announced that it would investigate whether Berezovsky's statements violated the law. However, in the following July, the Crown Prosecution Service announced that Berezovsky would not face charges in the UK for his comments. Kremlin officials called it a "disturbing moment" in Anglo-Russian relations.

=== Involvement in the 2004 Ukrainian presidential election ===
In September 2005, the former president of Ukraine, Leonid Kravchuk, accused Berezovsky of having financed Viktor Yushchenko's 2004 Ukrainian presidential election campaign, and provided copies of documents showing money transfers from companies he claimed were controlled by Berezovsky to companies controlled by Yuschenko's official backers. Berezovsky claimed that he met Yushchenko's representatives in London before the election, and that the money was transferred from his companies, but he declined to confirm or deny that the companies that received the money were used in Yushchenko's campaign. Financing of election campaigns by foreign citizens is illegal in Ukraine. In November 2005, Berezovsky also claimed he had heavily financed Ukraine's Orange Revolution (that had followed the presidential election). In September 2007, Berezovsky launched lawsuits against two Ukrainian politicians, Oleksandr Tretyakov, a former presidential aid, and David Zhvaniya, a former emergencies minister. Berezovsky was suing the men for nearly US$23 million, accusing them of misusing the money he had allocated in 2004 to fund the Orange Revolution. Yushchenko has denied Berezovsky financed his election campaign.

Berezovsky called on Ukrainian business to support Yushchenko in the 2010 presidential election of January 2010 as a guarantor of debarment of property redistribution after the election. On 10 December 2009, the Ukrainian minister of interior affairs Yuriy Lutsenko stated that if the Russian interior ministry requested it, Berezovsky would be detained upon arriving in Ukraine.

In February 2012, in an interview for the independent Russian TV Rain channel Berezovsky reiterated that he had personally provided approximately $50 million to the Ukrainian Orange revolution. David Zhvania (Russian: Давид Важаевич Жвания) and Oleksandr Tretiakov were among the ones who allegedly received money.

=== Persona non-grata in Latvia since October 2005 ===
In October 2005, Latvian Prime Minister Aigars Kalvītis signed a decree placing Berezovsky on the list of personae non gratae. The exact reasons for blacklisting Berezovsky were not disclosed. Kalvitis called Berezovsky a "threat" to national security. Previously, the National Security Council of Latvia took the decision to recommend that Berezovsky be barred from travelling to Latvia. The decision to bar the one-time Russian oligarch came swiftly after Berezovsky's trip to Riga in September 2005. Berezovsky was in Riga along with Neil Bush to discuss a project with Latvian businessmen.

The Baltic News Service quoted Berezovsky saying that he believes Latvia's decision to declare him persona non-grata was the result of intense pressure by Russia and structures linked with George Soros, the US business magnate who had had acrimonious relations with Berezovsky. Kalvitis however denied the theory that the banning came on pressure from the Kremlin or the White House.

== Alleged assassination attempts in London ==
=== Alleged 2003 assassination plot ===
According to Alexander Litvinenko, a Russian Federal Security Service (FSB) officer in London was preparing to assassinate Berezovsky with a binary weapon in September 2003. This alleged plot was reported to British police. Hazel Blears, then a Home Office Minister, said that inquiries made [into these claims] were "unable to either substantiate this information or find evidence of any criminal offences having been committed".

=== Alleged 2007 assassination plot ===
In June 2007, Berezovsky said he fled Britain on the advice of Scotland Yard, amid reports that he was the target of an assassination attempt by a suspected Russian hitman. On 18 July 2007, the British tabloid The Sun reported that the alleged would-be assassin was captured by the police at the Hilton Hotel in Park Lane. They reported that the suspect, arrested by the anti-terrorist police after being tracked for a week by MI5, was deported back to Russia when no weapons were found and there was not enough evidence to charge him with any offence. In addition, they said British police placed a squad of uniformed officers around Akhmed Zakayev's house in north London, and also phoned Litvinenko's widow, Marina, to urge her to take greater security precautions.

Berezovsky again accused Vladimir Putin of being behind a plot to assassinate him. The Kremlin had denied similar claims in the past.

According to the interview given by a high-ranking British security official on BBC Two in July 2008, the alleged Russian agent, known as "A", was of Chechen nationality. He was identified by Kommersant as the Chechen mobster Movladi Atlangeriyev; after returning to Russia, Atlangeriyev was forcibly disappeared in January 2008 by unknown men in Moscow.

== Allegations in the poisoning of Alexander Litvinenko (2006) and libel suit (2010) ==
Alexander Litvinenko, one of Berezovsky's closest associates, was murdered in London in November 2006 with a rare radioactive poison, Polonium 210. A dubious narrative – that the murder was orchestrated by Berezovsky and his associate Alex Goldfarb with the aim of "framing" the Russian government and discrediting it on the global stage – aired in Russian state-funded media by Nikita Chekulin, and by Russian officials. Berezovsky won a libel suit in the UK against Russian State Television over these allegations in 2010.

== Death ==
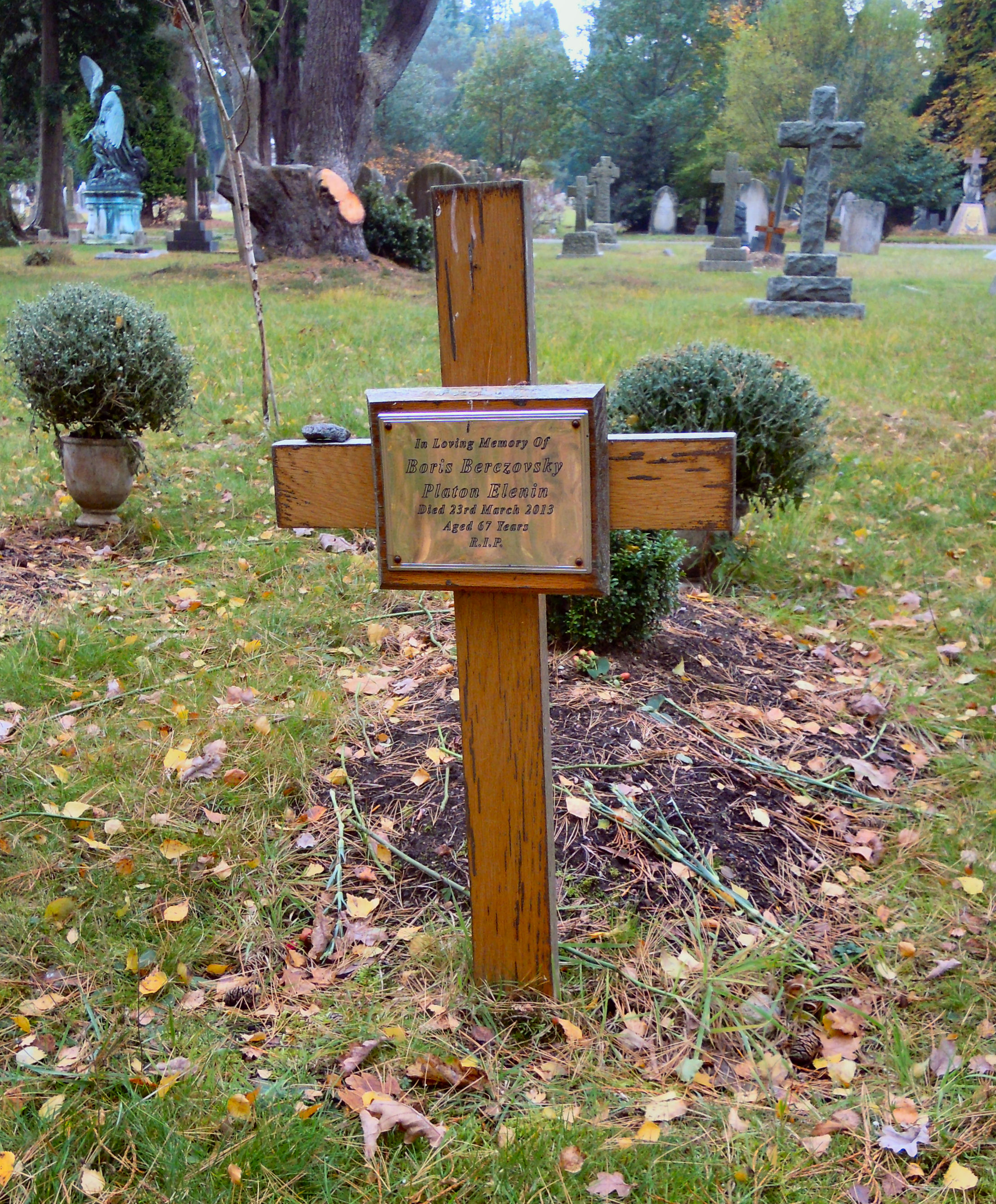
Berezovsky's grave in Brookwood Cemetery in 2016

On 23 March 2013, Berezovsky was found dead at his home, Titness Park, at Sunninghill, near Ascot in Berkshire. His body was found by a bodyguard in a locked bathroom, with a ligature around his neck.

His death was announced in a post on Facebook, by his son-in-law. Alexander Dobrovinsky, a lawyer who had represented Berezovsky, wrote that he may have committed suicide, adding that Berezovsky had fallen into debt after losing the lawsuit against Abramovich, and had spent the final few months of his life selling his possessions to cover his court costs. Berezovsky was also said to have recently been depressed and to have isolated himself from friends. He reportedly suffered from depression and was taking antidepressant drugs; a day prior to his death he told a reporter in London that he had nothing left to live for.

The Thames Valley Police classified his death as "unexplained" and launched a formal investigation into the circumstances behind it. Specialists in chemical, biological, radiological and nuclear materials were deployed to Berezovsky's home as a "precaution". These specialists later "found nothing of concern".

Berezovsky was buried on 8 May 2013 in a private ceremony at Brookwood Cemetery (Plot 4) in Surrey. The burial timing had been changed on several occasions to try to avoid interest from the Russian media.

A post-mortem examination carried out by the Home Office pathologist found the cause of death was consistent with hanging and there was nothing pointing to a violent struggle. At the March 2014 inquest into the death, however, Berezovsky's daughter Elizaveta introduced a report by German pathologist Bernd Brinkmann, with whom she had shared the autopsy photos, noting that the ligature mark on her father's neck was circular rather than V-shaped as is commonly the case with hanging victims, and called the coroner's attention to a statement by one of the responding paramedics who found it strange that Berezovsky's face was purple, rather than pale as hanging victims usually are. The body also had a fresh wound on the back of the head and a fractured rib (injuries police believed Berezovsky could have suffered in the process of falling as he hanged himself). An unidentified fingerprint was found near the body, and one paramedic's radiation alarm sounded as they entered the house. Pathologist Bernd Brinkmann said that he did not believe that the marks on Berezovsky's neck were a result of hanging. Following the inquest the coroner, Peter Bedford, recorded an open verdict commenting, "I am not saying Mr Berezovsky took his own life, I am not saying Mr Berezovsky was unlawfully killed. What I am saying is that the burden of proof sets such a high standard it is impossible for me to say."

=== Apology to Putin ===
After Berezovsky's death, a spokesman for President Putin reported that Berezovsky had sent a letter to the Russian president, asking for permission to return to Russia and asking "forgiveness for his mistakes". Some of Berezovsky's associates doubted the letter's existence, claiming that it was out of character. However, his girlfriend at the time, Katerina Sabirova, later confirmed in an interview that he did in fact send the letter:

I said that they will publish it and you will look bad. And that it won't help. He answered that it was all the same to him, that in any case all sins were blamed on him and that this was his only chance.

It was claimed by anonymous sources that rival Roman Abramovich delivered the letter to Putin personally, having received an apology from Berezovsky himself. Both Putin's chief of staff, Sergei Ivanov, and Abramovich's spokesman alluded to the letter being passed by a "certain person", but did not go into details due to the personal nature of the issue.

== Publications by Berezovsky ==
Berezovsky was a doctor of technical sciences and author of many academic papers and studies such as "Binary relations in multi-criteria optimizations" and "Multi-criteria optimization: mathematical aspects". In the mathematical review index MathSciNet, B. A. Berezovsky is credited with 16 publications from 1975 to 1989 on operations research and mathematical programming, earning 9 citations in other publications. Most cited is the book The Problem of Optimal Choice with A. V. Gnedin (Nauka, Moscow 1984), devoted to secretary problems.

Aside from his academic publications, he frequently authored articles and gave interviews; these are collected in The Art of the Impossible (3 volumes). He continued to contribute articles while in exile, taking a highly critical view of Russia's political leaders.

== Works about Berezovsky ==
In 1996, the Russian-American journalist Paul Klebnikov wrote a highly critical article entitled "Godfather of the Kremlin?" on Berezovsky and the state of Russia more generally, in response to which Berezovsky sued Forbes in the UK; in 2001, he expanded his article into a book entitled Godfather of the Kremlin, alternatively subtitled The Decline of Russia in the Age of Gangster Capitalism and Boris Berezovsky and the looting of Russia. On 9 July 2004, while leaving the Forbes office in Moscow, unknown assailants fired at Klebnikov from a slowly moving car. He was shot four times and died later in hospital. The same day Berezovsky, in the words of investigative journalist Richard Behar, "whipped out his tongue from its holster and publicly called the 41-year-old editor of Forbes Russia 'a dishonest reporter'". The books Secret Diary of a Russian Oligarch and How to get rid of an Oligarch or Who Beat Berezovsky by Sasha Nerozina (friend of the Berezovsky family and a spokeswoman of Berezovsky's wife Galina) were published in Russia and other former Soviet states in 2013 and 2014 by Olma Media Publishing House.

Yuli Dubov, a close business associate of Berezovsky, wrote a novel based on Berezovsky's life which provided the basis for the 2002 film Tycoon. Like Berezovsky, he fled to London and successfully fought extradition to Russia. Judge Timothy Workman of Bow Street Magistrates' Court in central London dropped extradition proceedings against Yuly Dubov in October 2003.

Alex Goldfarb, a microbiologist and activist who became acquainted with Berezovsky in the 1990s and later worked for him, provides snapshots of Berezovsky at crucial moments as background to his 2007 account of the Litvinenko murder case, co-written with Marina Litvinenko, Death of a Dissident: The Poisoning of Alexander Litvinenko and the Return of the KGB. David E. Hoffman of The Washington Post wrote The Oligarchs: Wealth and Power in the New Russia, which provides a comparative treatment of Berezovsky and several of his fellow so-called business oligarchs. Ben Mezrich wrote Once Upon a Time in Russia: The Rise of the Oligarchs—A True Story of Ambition, Wealth, Betrayal, and Murder, which provides a comparative narrative of Berezovsky and Roman Abramovich through their careers, friendship, and ultimate rivalry.

Even before the funeral, the famous journalist Evgeny Dodolev managed to release the book "БереZOVский, разобранный по буквам" ("Berezovsky, spelled out"). In 2019, he released another book about the oligarch's relations with journalists, recalling his collaboration with Berezovsky when launching the satirical tabloid Moskovskaya Komsomolka in 1999.

In 2017, the Russian book The age of Berezovsky (also known as The time of Berezovsky) was published by Corpus (an imprint of AST), in which Petr Aven – a friend of Berezovsky – interviewed various people who were close to Berezovsky at different times, including Leonid Boguslavsky, Yuli Dubov, Galina Besharova, Yelena Gorbunova, Yuri Shefler, Anatoly Chubais, Mikhail Fridman, Valentin Yumashev, Sergey Dorenko, Eugene Shvidler, Vladimir Posner, Alexander Goldfarb, Alexander Voloshin, Stanislav Belkovsky and Yuri Felshtinsky. In the book Aven opined that Berezovsky "played a particularly important role in two episodes of new Russian history: the 1996 election and the struggle against Primakov and Luzhkov in

1999".

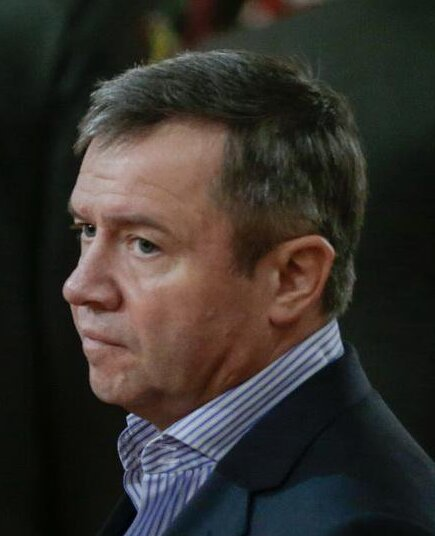
Valentin Yumashev

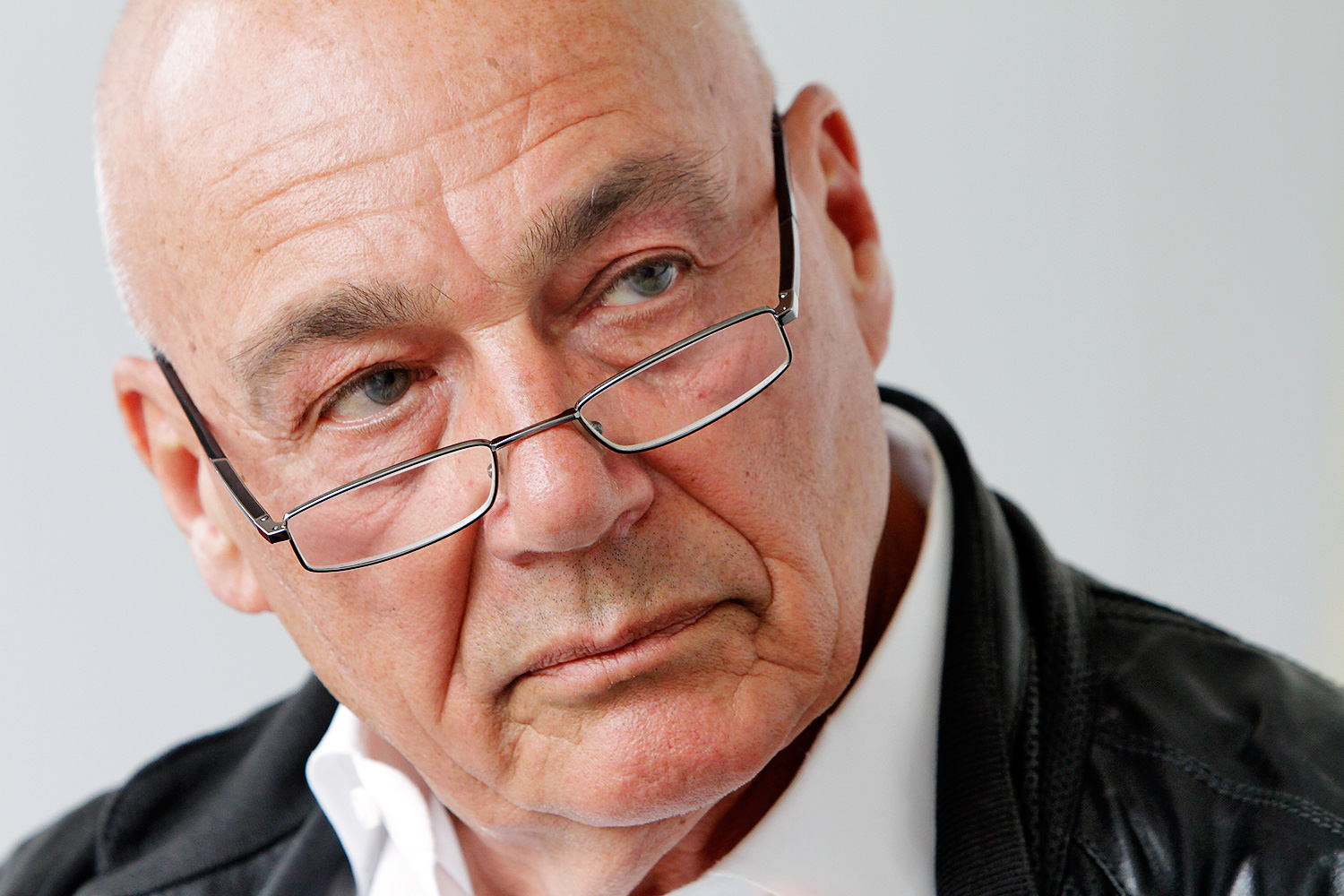
Vladimir Pozner

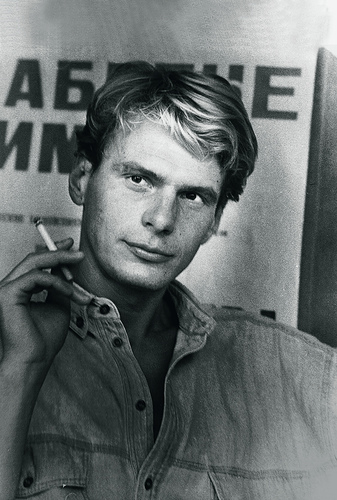
Evgeny Dodolev

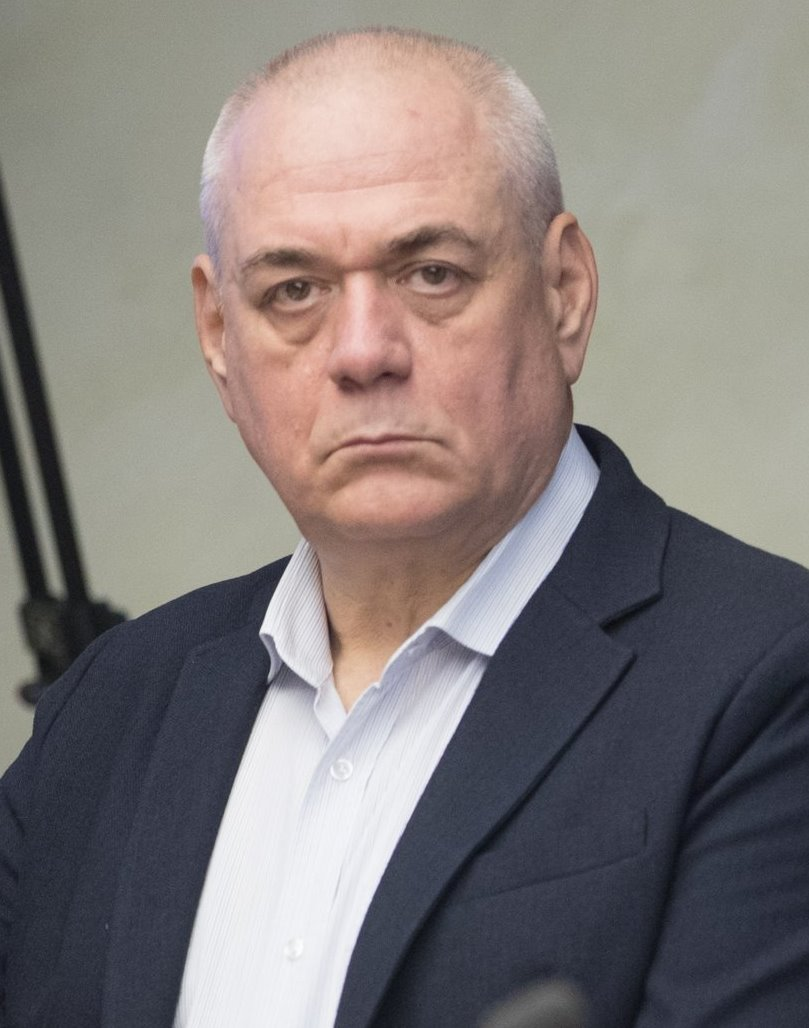
Sergey Dorenko

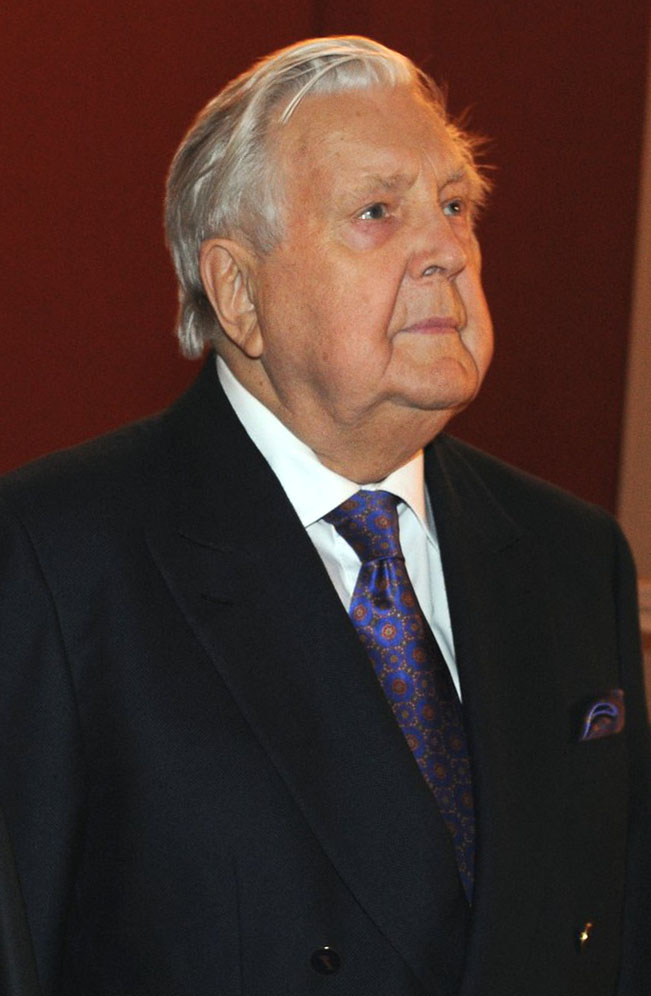
Glasunov

A documentary about Berezovsky's efforts to undermine Putin from his exile in UK was shown on BBC Two in December 2005.

Berezovsky features in a painting by the Russian artist Ilya Glazunov, displayed in Moscow's Ilya Glazunov Gallery. According to the Rough Guide, "The Market of Our Democracy shows Yeltsin waving a conductor's baton as two lesbians kiss and the oligarch Berezovsky flaunts a sign reading 'I will buy Russia', while charlatans rob a crowd of refugees and starving children."

Berezovsky also features as a character in the opera The Life and Death of Alexander Litvinenko by Alexander Woolf to a libretto by David Pountney, which was premiered in July 2021 at Grange Park Opera.

Patriots premiered at the Almeida Theatre in Islington, London, in May 2022, following the life of Berezovsky from the president's inner circle to public enemy number one. Tom Hollander played Berezovsky. The play was written by Peter Morgan and directed by Rupert Goold. It played a limited run from 2 July 2022 until 20 August. It transferred to the West End in 2023.

In the 2022 ITVX miniseries Litvinenko, Berezovsky was portrayed by Nikolai Tsankov.

== See also ==
- List of unsolved deaths
- Russian oligarchs
- Semibankirschina
- Tycoon (2002 film)
