= Litvinenko Justice Foundation =

Litvinenko Justice Foundation is a non-profit organization established to demand justice for Alexander Litvinenko who was allegedly poisoned in London, United Kingdom on 1 November 2006.

According to organizers, they will do "everything possible to make sure that suspects will stand trial in the UK and will not be shielded from justice by the Russian state."

The Litvinenko Justice Foundation was founded by Alexander Litvinenko's widow, Marina, and his two friends, Boris Berezovsky and Alex Goldfarb. They were joined by human rights lawyer Louise Christian.

The Foundation was registered in London on 2 March 2007. Initial funding was provided by Berezovsky.

After Marina Litvinenko was granted an inquest into the death of her husband in October 2011, the Foundation launched a public fundraising campaign to help her offset her legal costs.
