= Alexander Goldfarb (biologist) =

American microbiologist (born 1947)

Alexander Davidovich Goldfarb
- Александр Давидович Гольдфарб
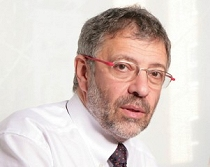
- Alexander Goldfarb in 2007
- Born: May 23, 1947 (age 79); Moscow, Russia
- Education: Moscow State University (1969)
- Occupations: Microbiologist, Activist, Author
- Known for: Co-founder of Litvinenko Justice Foundation

Alexander Davidovich Goldfarb (a.k.a. Alex Goldfarb, Russian: Александр Давидович Гольдфарб; born 1947 in Moscow) is a Russian-American microbiologist, activist, and author. He emigrated from the USSR in 1975 and studied in Israel and Germany before settling permanently in New York in 1982. Goldfarb is a naturalized American citizen. He has combined a scientific career as a microbiologist with political and public activities focused on civil liberties and human rights in Russia, in the course of which he has been associated with Andrei Sakharov, George Soros, Boris Berezovsky, and Alexander Litvinenko. He last visited Russia in 2000.

== Scientific career ==
Goldfarb studied biochemistry at Moscow State University and graduated in 1969. After graduation, he worked at the Kurchatov Institute of Atomic Energy in Moscow. He emigrated from the USSR in 1975. He received a Ph.D. in 1980 from the Weizmann Institute in Israel. Back in the west, he continued his research with a post-doctoral program at the Max Planck Institute for Biochemistry in Martinsried, Germany. From 1982 to 1991 he was an assistant professor at Columbia University in New York. From 1992 to 2006 he was a faculty member at the Public Health Research Institute in New York where he led a U.S. government-funded study "Structure and Function of RNA Polymerase in E. coli" with a total budget of $7 million. He also directed the project "Treating Multi-drug-resistant tuberculosis in Siberian Prisons" funded by a $13 million grant from philanthropist George Soros.

== Activism ==
After he emigrated, Goldfarb maintained contact with dissidents in the Soviet Union and was a spokesman for Moscow refuseniks. He translated for Andrei Sakharov at press conferences in advance of his 1975 Nobel Peace Prize and helped organize the first American television appearance of Sakharov when Mikhail Gorbachev released the physicist from internal exile. From 1984 to 1986 Soviet authorities refused Goldfarb's father permission to leave the USSR after their unsuccessful attempt to make him collaborate and entrap American journalist Nicholas Daniloff.

Goldfarb was among the first political emigres to return to the Soviet Union after Gorbachev launched his reforms. Impressions of his first visit in October 1987 were published as a cover story in The New York Times magazine under the title "Testing Glasnost. An Exile Visits his Homeland".

The story caught the attention of US philanthropist George Soros, leading to a decade-long association between the two men. According to Soros' biographer Robert Slater, Goldfarb was among the first group of Russian exiles in New York whom Soros invited to brainstorm his potential Foundation in Russia. In 1991 Goldfarb persuaded Soros to donate $100 million to help former Soviet scientists survive the hardships of the economic shock therapy adopted by the Boris Yeltsin government.

From 1992 to 1995, Goldfarb was Director of Operations at Soros' International Science Foundation, which helped sustain tens of thousands of scientists and scholars in the former Soviet Union during the harshest three years of economic reform. In 1994 Goldfarb managed Soros' Russian Internet Project, which built infrastructure and provided free Internet access for university campuses across Russia. That project created a controversy because of a conflict with emerging Russian commercial interests in the ISP field. In 1995, during the first months of the First Chechen War, Goldfarb oversaw a Soros-funded relief operation, which ended disastrously with the disappearance of the American relief worker Fred Cuny. From 1998 to 2000 Goldfarb directed the $15 million Soros tuberculosis project in Russia. He worked with Dr. Paul Farmer to battle TB in Russian prisons, an endeavor described by the Pulitzer Prize winner Tracy Kidder in his book Mountains Beyond Mountains.

Since 2001 Goldfarb has been Executive Director of the New York-based International Foundation for Civil Liberties, founded and financed by the exiled Russian oligarch Boris Berezovsky. The fact that Goldfarb knew Berezovsky well is described in the book The age of Berezovsky, written by Petr Aven.

== Involvement in the Litvinenko affair ==
Goldfarb first met Alexander Litvinenko during his tuberculosis project in Russian prisons. In October 2000, at the request of Boris Berezovsky, Goldfarb visited Turkey where he met Litvinenko and his family, who had just fled from Russia. Goldfarb arranged their entry to the United Kingdom, an offense under British law, for which he was banned from visiting Britain for a year. His involvement would also "cost him his job with George Soros."

When Litvinenko was poisoned in London in 2006, Goldfarb was his unofficial spokesman during the two last weeks of his life On the day of Litvinenko's death, Goldfarb read out his deathbed statement accusing Vladimir Putin of ordering the poisoning.

Goldfarb later explained in interviews that he had drafted the statement at Litvinenko's request and that Litvinenko had signed it in the presence of a lawyer. With Berezovsky, Litvinenko's widow Marina, and the human rights lawyer Louise Christian, Goldfarb founded the Litvinenko Justice Foundation to campaign for the truth about his murder, and for the perpetrators to be brought to justice. He later testified in a libel suit, in which Berezovsky successfully contested the claim by Russian state television station RTR (now Russia 1) that he had murdered Litvinenko.

== Libel lawsuit against Russian TV channels ==
Following the attack on Sergei Skripal in Salisbury, UK on March 4, 2018, Russian TV network coverage of the incident named Goldfarb as the murderer of Alexander Litvinenko in 2006. Goldfarb sued two Russian TV channels, Channel One Russia and RT, for libel in US. The case is pending in US District Court for the Southern District of New York. On March 4, 2020, U.S. District Judge Valerie Caproni denied a motion to dismiss the case, ruling that New York had personal jurisdiction over the matter because Channel One Russia maintains a Manhattan studio where correspondent Zhanna Agalakova interviewed Goldfarb in relation to the allegedly defamatory story. On April 10, 2024 Federal judge John P. Croanan awarded Goldfarb $ 25 million judgment against Channel One

== Writings ==
Goldfarb has written for the editorial pages of The New York Times, The Washington Post, The Wall Street Journal, The Daily Telegraph, and The Moscow Times. He helped Litvinenko to prepare his book Lubyanka Criminal Group for publication. With Marina Litvinenko, he later co-authored the book "Death of a Dissident: The Poisoning of Alexander Litvinenko and the Return of the KGB", published in Russian as "Sasha, Volodya, Boris....The Story of a Murder." (Russian)Александр Гольдфарб – о Путине и Литвиненко, Алекс Гольдфарб представляет книгу “Саша, Володя, Борис. История убийства”.

== His books ==
- Alex Goldfarb and Marina Litvinenko. Death of a Dissident: The Poisoning of Alexander Litvinenko and the Return of the KGB. Free Press, New York, 2007. ISBN 978-1-4165-5165-2.
- Александр Гольдфарб. Быль об отце, сыне, шпионах, диссидентах и тайнах биологического оружия. НЛО, Москва 2023. ISBN 978-5-4448-1962-3

== Appearances on TV ==
- Charlie Rose – A conversation with Marina Litvinenko and Alex Goldfarb
- BBC Hardtalk – Marina Litvinenko

== In popular culture ==
In the 2022 ITVX miniseries Litvinenko, Goldfarb was portrayed by Mark Ivanir.
