= Death of a Dissident =

Book written by Alexander Goldfarb and Marina Litvinenko

Death of a Dissident: The Poisoning of Alexander Litvinenko and the Return of the KGB
- First edition cover
- Author: Alex Goldfarb and Marina Litvinenko
- Language: English
- Genre: Biography
- Publisher: The Free Press
- Publication date: 22 May 2007
- Publication place: United States
- Media type: Print (hardcover)
- Pages: 369 pp
- ISBN: 978-1-4165-5165-2
- OCLC: 104889488

Death of a Dissident: The Poisoning of Alexander Litvinenko and the Return of the KGB is a book written by Alexander Goldfarb and Marina Litvinenko about the life and death of her husband, former FSB officer Alexander Litvinenko who was poisoned by the radioactive element polonium in London in November 2006.

== Content ==
The life of Alexander Litvinenko has been described in the book at the background of power struggle between different political forces in post-Soviet Russia. The book presents active measures which, according to authors, have been undertaken by Russian state-security services to bring FSB leaders to power, from an attempted coup allegedly organized by Alexander Korzhakov in 1996 to the election of Vladimir Putin, who became popular as a result of the Second Chechen war. However, according to the book, Putin was appointed the Prime minister of Russia as a result of a secret deal with oligarch Boris Berezovsky.

According to the book, the FSB received a direct order from Russian president Vladimir Putin to kill Alexander Litvinenko, and it also had a hand in the 1999 apartment bombings, the Moscow theater hostage crisis and the murder of Anna Politkovskaya.

== Reviews ==
Nicholas Blincoe noted that the book is really a memoir by the former Russian dissident Alex Goldfarb who is an employee of Boris Berezovsky. Blincoe points out the problem, that "if everyone, including Goldfarb, is in Berezovsky's pay, there are no disinterested accounts, only potential apologists for his world-view." Blincoe further asserts that the fact that Berezovsky was the mastermind behind Putin's rise to power is evidence that no KGB-sponsored coup d'état took place - contrary to what was claimed in the book.

== Bibliography ==
- Goldfarb, Alex; with Marina Litvinenko. Death of a Dissident: The Poisoning of Alexander Litvinenko and the Return of the KGB. New York: Free Press. ISBN 978-1-4165-5165-2.
- Litvinenko, Marina (5 November 2026). A Life in Fragments: Our Love, His Murder, My Resistance. Bloomsbury Publishing. ISBN 978-1-5266-9639-7.
