= Alexander Litvinenko =

British-naturalised Russian defector (1962–2006)

- Александр Литвиненко
- Born: Aleksandr Valterovich Litvinenko; 30 August 1962; Voronezh, Russian SFSR, Soviet Union
- Died: 23 November 2006 (aged 44); Bloomsbury, London, England
- Cause of death: Radiation poisoning (assassination)
- Burial place: Highgate Cemetery, Highgate London, England
- Citizenship: Soviet Union (1962–1991); Russia (1991–2006); United Kingdom (2006)
- Spouses: Nataliya (m. 1981; div. 1994) Marina (m. 1994)
- Children: 3
- Awards: Hero of the Nation
- Espionage activity
- Allegiance: Soviet Union (lapsed); Russia (defected); United Kingdom
- Service branch: KGB (lapsed); FSB (defected); MI6

Alexander Valterovich Litvinenko (Note: Russian: Александр Вальтерович Литвиненко, IPA: [ɐlʲɪˈksandr ˈvaltɨrəvʲɪtɕ lʲɪtvʲɪˈnʲɛnkə]) (30 August 1962 – 23 November 2006) was a British-naturalised Russian defector and former officer of the Russian Federal Security Service (FSB) who specialised in tackling organised crime. A prominent critic of Russian President Vladimir Putin, he advised British intelligence and coined the term "mafia state."

In November 1998, Litvinenko and several other FSB officers publicly accused their superiors of ordering the assassination of the Russian oligarch Boris Berezovsky. Litvinenko was arrested the following March on charges of exceeding the authority of his position. He was acquitted in November 1999 but re-arrested before the charges were again dismissed in 2000. He fled with his family to London and was granted asylum in the United Kingdom, where he worked as a journalist, writer, and consultant for the British intelligence services.

During his time in London, Litvinenko wrote two books, Blowing Up Russia: Terror from Within and Lubyanka Criminal Group, in which he accused the Russian secret services of staging the Russian apartment bombings in 1999 and other acts of terrorism in an effort to bring Vladimir Putin to power. He also accused Putin of ordering the assassination of the Russian journalist Anna Politkovskaya in 2006.

On 1 November 2006, Litvinenko suddenly fell ill and was hospitalised after poisoning with polonium-210; he died from the poisoning on 23 November. The events leading up to this are well documented, despite spawning numerous theories relating to his poisoning and death. A British murder investigation identified Andrey Lugovoy, a former member of Russia's Federal Protective Service (FSO), as the main suspect. Dmitry Kovtun was later named as a second suspect. The United Kingdom demanded that Lugovoy be extradited; Russia denied the extradition as the Russian constitution prohibits the extradition of Russian citizens, leading to a straining of relations between Russia and the United Kingdom.

After Litvinenko's death, his wife Marina, aided by biologist Alexander Goldfarb, pursued a vigorous campaign through the Litvinenko Justice Foundation. In October 2011, she won the right for an inquest into her husband's death to be conducted by a coroner in London; the inquest was repeatedly set back by issues relating to examinable evidence. A public inquiry began on 27 January 2015, and concluded in January 2016 that Litvinenko's murder was carried out by the two suspects and that they were "probably" acting under the direction of the FSB and with the approval of Putin and then FSB director Nikolai Patrushev. In the 2021 case Carter v Russia, the European Court of Human Rights ruled that Russia was responsible for his death and ordered the country to pay €100,000 in damages.

== Early life and career ==
Alexander Litvinenko was born in the Russian city of Voronezh in 1962. After he graduated from a Nalchik secondary school in 1980, he was drafted into the Internal Troops of the Ministry of Internal Affairs as a Private. After a year of service, he matriculated in the Kirov Higher Command School in Vladikavkaz. In 1981, Litvinenko married Nataliya, an accountant, with whom he had a son, Alexander, and a daughter, Sonia. This marriage ended in divorce in 1994 and in the same year Litvinenko married Marina, a ballroom dancer and fitness instructor, with whom he had a son, Anatoly.

After graduation in 1985, Litvinenko became a platoon commander in the Dzerzhinsky Division of the Soviet Ministry of Internal Affairs. He was assigned to the 4th Company of 4th Regiment, where among his duties was the protection of valuable cargo while in transit. In 1986, he became an informant when he was recruited by the MVD's KGB counterintelligence section and in 1988, he was officially transferred to the Third Chief Directorate of the KGB, Military Counter Intelligence. Later that year, after studying for a year at the Novosibirsk Military Counter Intelligence School, he became an operational officer and served in KGB military counterintelligence until 1991.

== Career in Russian security services ==
In 1991, Litvinenko was promoted to the Central Staff of the Federal Counterintelligence Service, specialising in counter-terrorist activities and infiltration of organised crime. He was awarded the title of "MUR veteran" for operations conducted with the Moscow criminal investigation department, the MUR. Litvinenko also saw active military service in many of the so-called "hot spots" of the former USSR and Russia. During the First Chechen War, Litvinenko planted several FSB agents in Chechnya. Although he was often called a "Russian spy" by western press, throughout his career he was not an 'intelligence agent' and did not deal with secrets beyond information on operations against organised criminal groups.

Litvinenko met Boris Berezovsky in 1994 when he took part in investigations into an assassination attempt on the oligarch. He later was responsible for the oligarch's security. Litvinenko's employment under Berezovsky and other security services created a conflict of interest, but such practice is usually tolerated by the Russian state.

In 1997, Litvinenko was promoted to the FSB Directorate of Analysis and Suppression of Criminal Groups, with the title of senior operational officer and deputy head of the Seventh Section.

== Conflict with FSB leadership ==
During his work in the FSB, Litvinenko discovered numerous connections between top leadership of Russian law enforcement agencies and Russian mafia groups, such as the Solntsevo gang. He wrote a memorandum about this issue for Boris Yeltsin. Berezovsky arranged a meeting for him with FSB director Mikhail Barsukov and deputy director of Internal affairs Ovchinnikov to discuss the corruption problems; however, this had no effect. Litvinenko gradually realized that the entire system was corrupt from the top to the bottom. He explained: "If your partner [cheated] you, or a creditor did not pay, or a supplier did not deliver— where did you turn to complain? [...] When force became a commodity, there was always demand for it. "Roofs" (krysha) appeared— people who sheltered and protected your business. First it was provided by the mob, then by police, and soon even our own guys realized what was what, and then the rivalry began among gangsters, cops, and the Agency for market share. As the police and the FSB became more competitive, they squeezed the gangs out of the market. However, in many cases competition gave way to cooperation, and the services became gangsters themselves."

On 25 July 1998, Berezovsky introduced Litvinenko to Vladimir Putin. He said: "Go see Putin. Make yourself known. See what a great guy we have installed, with your help." On the same day, Putin replaced Nikolay Kovalyov as the Director of the Federal Security Service, with help from Berezovsky. Litvinenko reported to Putin on corruption in the FSB, but Putin was unimpressed. Litvinenko said to his wife after the meeting: "I could see in his eyes that he hated me." Litvinenko said that he was doing an investigation of Uzbek drug barons who received protection from the FSB, and Putin tried to stall the investigation to save his reputation.

On 13 November 1998, Berezovsky wrote an open letter to Putin in Kommersant. He accused four senior officers of the Directorate of Analysis and Suppression of Criminal Groups of ordering his assassination: Major-General Yevgeny Khokholkov, N. Stepanov, A. Kamyshnikov, and N. Yenin.

Four days later, on 17 November, Litvinenko and four other officers appeared together in a press conference at the Russian news agency Interfax. All officers worked for both FSB in the Directorate of Analysis and Suppression of Criminal Groups. They repeated the allegation made by Berezovsky. The officers also said they were ordered to kill Mikhail Trepashkin who was also present at the press conference, and to kidnap a brother of the businessman Umar Dzhabrailov. In 2007, Sergey Dorenko provided the Associated Press and The Wall Street Journal with a complete copy of an interview he conducted in April 1998 for ORT, a television station, with Litvinenko and his fellow employees. The interview, of which only excerpts were broadcast in 1998, shows the FSB officers, who were disguised in masks or dark glasses, claim that their bosses had ordered them to kill, kidnap or frame prominent Russian politicians and businesspeople.

After holding the press conference, Litvinenko was dismissed from the FSB. Later, in an interview with Yelena Tregubova, Putin said that he personally ordered the dismissal of Litvinenko, stating, "I fired Litvinenko and disbanded his unit ...because FSB officers should not stage press conferences. This is not their job. And they should not make internal scandals public." Litvinenko also believed that Putin was behind his arrest. He said, "Putin had the power to decide whether to pass my file to the prosecutors or not. He always hated me. And there was a bonus for him: by throwing me to the wolves he distanced himself from Boris [Berezovsky] in the eyes of FSB's generals."

== Flight from Russia and asylum in the United Kingdom ==
In October 2000, in violation of an order not to leave Moscow, Litvinenko and his family travelled to Turkey, possibly via Ukraine. While in Turkey, Litvinenko applied for asylum at the United States Embassy in Ankara, but his application was denied. With the help of Alexander Goldfarb, Litvinenko bought air tickets for the Istanbul–London–Moscow flight, and asked for political asylum at Heathrow Airport during the transit stop on 1 November 2000. Political asylum was granted on 14 May 2001, not because of his knowledge on intelligence matters, according to Litvinenko, but rather on humanitarian grounds. While in London he became a journalist for Chechenpress and an author. He also joined Berezovsky in campaigning against Putin's government. In October 2006, he became a naturalised British citizen with residence in Whitehaven.

In 2002, Litvinenko was convicted in absentia in Russia and given a three-and-a-half-year jail sentence for charges of corruption. According to Litvinenko's widow, Marina Litvinenko, her husband cooperated with the British security services, working as a consultant and helping the agencies to combat Russian organised crime in Europe. During the public inquiry which began in January 2015, it was confirmed that Litvinenko was recruited by MI6 to provide "useful information about senior Kremlin figures and their links with Russian organised crime", primarily related to Russian mafia activities in Spain.

Shortly before his death, Litvinenko tipped off Spanish authorities on several organised crime bosses with links to Spain. During a meeting in May 2006, he allegedly provided security officials with information on the locations, roles, and activities of several "Russian" mafia figures with ties to Spain, including Zahkar Kalashov, Vitaly Izguilov and Tariel Oniani.

Litvinenko allegedly converted to Islam in Britain and was rumoured to have told his father he had converted to Islam on his death bed. Litvinenko said his father commented about it: "It doesn't matter. At least you're not a communist." Akhmed Zakayev, who was present during the conversation, later arranged for an Imam to recite appropriate Koranic verses in the hospital room at Litvinenko's request the day before his death. Litvinenko also wished to be buried in Chechnya, since he was ashamed of Russia's actions there.

This account has been strongly denied by close family and friends. Visitors to Litvinenko's death bed included Boris Berezovsky and Litvinenko's father, Walter, who flew in from Moscow.

Mikhail Trepashkin said that in 2002 he had warned Litvinenko that an FSB unit was assigned to assassinate him. In spite of this, Litvinenko often travelled overseas with no security arrangements, and freely mingled with the Russian community in the United Kingdom, and often received journalists at his home.

== Allegations ==
Litvinenko published a number of allegations about the Russian government, most of which are related to conducting or sponsoring domestic and foreign terrorism.

=== Support of terrorism worldwide by the KGB and FSB ===
Litvinenko stated that "all the bloodiest terrorists of the world" were connected to FSB-KGB, including Carlos "The Jackal" Ramírez, Yasser Arafat, Saddam Hussein, Abdullah Öcalan, Wadie Haddad of the Popular Front for the Liberation of Palestine, George Hawi who led the Communist Party of Lebanon, Ezekias Papaioannou from Cyprus, Sean Garland from Ireland, and many others. He said that all of them were trained, funded, and provided with weapons, explosives and counterfeit documents to carry out terrorist attacks worldwide and that each act of terrorism made by these people was carried out according to the task and under the rigid control of the KGB of the USSR. Litvinenko said that "the center of global terrorism is not in Iraq, Iran, Afghanistan or the Chechen Republic. The terrorism infection creeps away worldwide from the cabinets of the Lubyanka Square and the Kremlin".

When asked in an interview who he thought the originator of the 2005 bombings in London was, Litvinenko responded saying, "You know, I have spoken about it earlier and I shall say now, that I know only one organization, which has made terrorism the main tool of solving of political problems. It is the Russian special services."

Litvinenko also commented on a new law that "Russia has the right to carry out preemptive strikes on militant bases abroad" and explained that these "preemptive strikes may involve anything except nuclear weapons." Litvinenko said, "You know who they mean when they say 'terrorist bases abroad'? They mean us, Zakayev and Boris and me." He also said that "It was considered in our service that poison is an easier weapon than a pistol." He referred to a secret laboratory in Moscow that still continues development of deadly poisons, according to him.

=== Armenian parliament shooting ===
Litvinenko accused the Main Intelligence Directorate of the General-Staff of the Russian armed forces of having organised the 1999 Armenian parliament shooting that killed the Prime Minister of Armenia, Vazgen Sargsyan, and seven members of parliament, ostensibly to derail the peace process which would have resolved the Nagorno-Karabakh conflict, but he offered no evidence to support the accusation. The Russian embassy in Armenia denied any such involvement, and described Litvinenko's accusation as an attempt to harm relations between Armenia and Russia by people against the democratic reforms in Russia.

=== Russian apartment bombings ===
Litvinenko wrote two books, Lubyanka Criminal Group and Blowing Up Russia: Terror from Within (in co-authorship with historian Yuri Felshtinsky), where he accused the Russian secret services of staging the 1999 Russian apartment bombings and other terrorism acts in an effort to bring Vladimir Putin to power.

=== Moscow theatre hostage crisis ===
In a 2003 interview with the Australian SBS TV network, and aired on Dateline, Litvinenko alleged that two of the Chechen terrorists involved in the 2002 Moscow theatre siege – whom he named "Abdul the Bloody" and "Abu Bakar" – were working for the FSB, and that the agency manipulated the rebels into staging the attack. Litvinenko said, "[W]hen they tried to find [Abdul the Bloody and Abu Bakar] among the dead terrorists, they weren't there. The FSB got its agents out. So the FSB agents among Chechens organized the whole thing on FSB orders, and those agents were released." This echoed similar claims made by Mikhail Trepashkin. The leading role of an FSB agent, Khanpasha Terkibaev ("Abu Bakar"), was also described by Anna Politkovskaya, Ivan Rybkin and Alexander Khinshtein.

In April 2003, Litvinenko gave "the Terkibaev file" to Sergei Yushenkov when he visited London, who in turn passed it to Anna Politkovskaya. A few days later Yushenkov was assassinated. Terkibaev was later killed in Chechnya. According to Ivan Rybkin, a speaker of the Russian State Duma, "The authorities failed to keep [the FSB agent] Terkibaev out of public view, and that is why he was killed. I know how angry people were, because they knew Terkibaev had authorization from presidential administration."

=== Beslan school siege ===
In September 2004, Litvinenko suggested that the Russian secret services must have been aware of the plot beforehand and probably had organised the attack themselves in order to toughen laws on terrorism and expand the powers of law enforcement agencies. His conclusion was based on the fact that several Beslan hostage takers had been released from FSB custody just before the attack in Beslan. He said that they would have been freed only if they were of use to the FSB, and that even in the case that they were freed without being turned into FSB assets, they would be under strict surveillance that would not have allowed them to carry out the Beslan attack unnoticed.

Ella Kesayeva, co-chair of the group Voice of Beslan, supported Litvinenko's argument in a November 2008 article in Novaya Gazeta, noting the large number of hostage takers who were in government custody not long before attacking the school, and coming to the same conclusion.

=== Alleged Russia–al-Qaeda connection ===
In a July 2005 interview with the Polish newspaper Rzeczpospolita, Litvinenko alleged that Ayman al-Zawahiri, a prominent leader of al-Qaeda, was trained for half a year by the FSB in Dagestan in 1997. Litvinenko said that after this training, al-Zawahiri "was transferred to Afghanistan, where he had never been before and where, following the recommendation of his Lubyanka chiefs, he at once ... penetrated the milieu of Osama bin Laden and soon became his assistant in Al Qaeda." Konstantin Preobrazhenskiy, a former KGB officer and writer, supported this claim and said that Litvinenko "was responsible for securing the secrecy of Al-Zawahiri's arrival in Russia; he was trained by FSB instructors in Dagestan, Northern Caucasus, in 1996–1997." He said: "At that time, Litvinenko was the Head of the Subdivision for Internationally Wanted Terrorists of the First Department of the Operative-Inquiry Directorate of the FSB Anti-Terrorist Department. He was ordered to undertake the delicate mission of securing Al-Zawahiri from unintentional disclosure by the Russian police. Though Al-Zawahiri had been brought to Russia by the FSB using a false passport, it was still possible for the police to learn about his arrival and report to Moscow for verification. Such a process could disclose Al-Zawahiri as an FSB collaborator. In order to prevent this, Litvinenko visited a group of highly placed police officers to notify them in advance." According to Sergei Ignatchenko, an FSB spokesman, al-Zawahiri was arrested by Russian authorities in Dagestan in December 1996 and released in May 1997.

=== Assassination of Anna Politkovskaya ===
Two weeks before his poisoning, Litvinenko accused Vladimir Putin of ordering the assassination of the Russian journalist Anna Politkovskaya and stated that a former presidential candidate, Irina Hakamada, warned Politkovskaya about threats to her life coming from the Russian president. Litvinenko advised Politkovskaya to escape from Russia immediately. Hakamada denied her involvement in passing any specific threats, and said that she warned Politkovskaya only in general terms more than a year earlier. It remains unclear if Litvinenko referred to an earlier statement made by Boris Berezovsky, who claimed that Boris Nemtsov, a former Deputy Prime Minister of Russia, received word from Hakamada that Putin threatened her and like-minded colleagues in person. According to Berezovsky, Putin stated that Hakamada and her colleagues "will take in the head immediately, literally, not figuratively" if they "open the mouth" about the Russian apartment bombings.

=== Allegations concerning Romano Prodi ===
According to Litvinenko, the FSB deputy chief General Anatoly Trofimov said to him: "Don't go to Italy, there are many KGB agents among the politicians. Romano Prodi is our man there." Prodi was the Italian centre-left leader, and a former Prime Minister of Italy and former president of the European Commission. The conversation with Trofimov took place in 2000, after the Prodi–KGB scandal broke out in October 1999 due to information about Prodi provided by Vasili Mitrokhin.

In April 2006, a British member of the European Parliament for London, Gerard Batten of the United Kingdom Independence Party (UKIP), demanded an inquiry into the allegations. On 26 April 2006, Batten repeated his call for a parliamentary inquiry, revealing that "former senior members of the KGB are willing to testify in such an investigation, under the right conditions." He added: "It is not acceptable that this situation is unresolved, given the importance of Russia's relations with the European Union." On 22 January 2007, the BBC and ITV News released documents and video footage from February 2006, in which Litvinenko repeated his statements about Prodi.

Prodi denied the allegations. Litvinenko said that "Trofimov did not exactly say that Prodi was a KGB agent, because the KGB avoids using that word." The Mitrokhin Commission, which was established in 2002 and closed in 2006 with a majority and a minority report, without reaching shared conclusions, and without any concrete evidence given to support the original allegations of KGB ties to Italian politicians contained in the Mitrokhin Archive. Led by the centre-right coalition majority, it was criticized as politically motivated, as it was focused mainly on allegations against opposition figures. In November 2006, the new Italian Parliament with a centre-left coalition majority instituted a commission to investigate the Mitrokhin Commission for allegations that it was manipulated for political purposes. In December 2006, colonel ex-KGB agent Oleg Gordievsky, whom Mario Scaramella claimed as his source, confirmed the accusations made against Scaramella regarding the production of false material relating to Prodi and other Italian politicians, and underlined their lack of reliability.

=== Connections between FSB and mafia ===
In his book Gang from Lubyanka, Litvinenko alleged that Vladimir Putin during his time at the FSB was personally involved in protecting the drug trafficking from Afghanistan organised by Abdul Rashid Dostum. In December 2003, Russian authorities confiscated over 4,000 copies of the book. Shortly before his death, Alexander Litvinenko alleged that Vladimir Putin had cultivated a "good relationship" with Semion Mogilevich (head of the Russia mafia) since 1993 or 1994.

=== Alleged paedophilia of Vladimir Putin ===
In a July 2006 article published on Zakayev's Chechenpress website, Litvinenko alleged that Putin is a paedophile and that the KGB knew about it since Putin's graduation from the Red Banner Institute. Litvinenko said that the FSB had possessed video footage which documented sex between Putin and minor boys and that Putin destroyed it while FSB director. Litvinenko also claimed that Anatoly Trofimov and Artyom Borovik knew of the alleged paedophilia. A 2016 article in the New York Times described the allegation as "without evidence".

Litvinenko made the allegation after Putin kissed a boy on his stomach while stopping to chat with some tourists during a walk in the Kremlin grounds on 28 June 2006. The incident was recalled in a webcast organised by the BBC and Yandex, in which over 11,000 people asked Putin to explain the act, to which he responded, "He seemed very independent and serious... I wanted to cuddle him like a kitten and it came out in this gesture. He seemed so nice. ... There is nothing behind it."

Vladimir Bukovsky, a close friend of Litvinenko, said he was angry when he published the article, as he had strongly urged him against it. Bukovsky said that despite his ferocious hostility toward the Kremlin, Litvinenko still had the mind-set of a security officer and "could not understand the difference between truth and operational information." Bukosvky himself later got implicated in a controversy regarding him downloading numerous CSAM material.

=== Prophet Muhammad "cartoons" controversy ===
According to Litvinenko, the 2005 controversy over the publication in the Danish newspaper Jyllands-Posten of editorial cartoons depicting the Islamic prophet Muhammad was orchestrated by the FSB to punish Denmark for its refusal to extradite Chechen separatists.

=== Alleged FSB employees of Deripaska ===
One or two years before his death, Alexander Litvinenko alleged that Oleg Deripaska employed numerous senior FSB officials including FSB General Osadchy (Russian: ФСБ Генерал Осадчий, Александр Ильич), who was the assistant to the director of FSB; URPO FSB General Yevgeny KoKolkov, also tranliterated as Evgeny Khokholkov (Russian: УРПО ФСБ Генерал Хохольков, Евгений Григорьевич), who headed URPO, was from the Uzbek KGB and is central to Litvinenko's "Uzbek File"; (Note: Alexander Livinenko alleged that Sergey Yastrzhembsky (Russian: Сергей Ястржембский) received a dacha on Sokolina Gora that was purchased with Gafur Rakhimov's money, which was transferred through Alisher, who was Gafur's confidant in Moscow and a close friend of Yastrzhembsky, Yevgeny KoKolkov, also tranliterated as Evgeny Khokholkov (Russian: УРПО ФСБ Генерал Хохольков, Евгений Григорьевич), and Andrei Kokoshin (Russian: Кокошин, Андрей Афанасьевич), who was the former Deputy Minister of Defense and Secretary of the Security Service and is banned from entry to the United States. Litvinenko alleged that Alisher's wife was the head coach of the gymnastics team and was close to Shamil Tarpischev (Russian: Шамил Тарпищев) and another minister of sports, Ivanyuzhenkov (Russian: Иванюженков), who allegedly was a member of the Podolsk criminal group (Russian: Подольская преступная группировка) and nicknamed Ratan (Russian: Ратан). Litvinenko alleged that Tarpischev was close to Alimzhan "Alik" Tokhtakhunov (Taiwanchik) who attended the same school with Khokholkov in Tashkent. Litvinenko alleged that the connections were Gafur with Taiwanchik, Taiwanchik with Tarpishchev, Tarpischev with Alisher, Alisher with Yastrzhembsky, Yastrzhembsky with Gafur. Livinenko alleged that Putin uses "common money" with a certain Khokholkov from the FSB and that Khokholkov protects Uzbeks who are the suppliers of Afghan drugs from Central Asia to Russia and that Putin covers for Khokholkov and puts pressure on his opponents. Litvinenko alleged that Putin also covers for a certain Yastrzhembsky, his close employee, who receives money from the same Uzbeks. Litvinenko alleged that Putin knows that Khokholkov and Yastrzhembsky knowingly are connected with the drug business and that, when crimes were committed, Putin provided the roof or krysha (Russian: Крыша, "protection") with Saint Petersburg serving as a transshipment point for Afghan goods to Western markets.) FSB General Vladimir Vasilevich Lutsenko (Russian: Луценко, Владимир Васильевич; born 1948), ex-FSB top officer who headed the private security firm "STEALTH", also transliterated as "STELS" or "STELLS", (Russian: ЧОП «Стелс»); (Note: Alexander Litvinenko alleged that, in the summer of 1996, "Stealth", also transliterated as "STELS" or "STELLS" (Russian: ЧОП «Стелс»), lost support from government agencies and ended up completely under the control of the Russian Mafia group Izmaylovskaya organized crime group (Russian: Измайловская организованная преступная группировка).) General Pronin (Russian: Пронин, Владимир Васильевич), General Anatoly Oleynikov (Russian: Олейников, Анатолий Аввакумович; 5 September 1940, Mikhailovo-Aleksandrovka village, Chertkovsky District, Rostov Oblast, USSR – 5 February 2009, Moscow), who was the first deputy minister of security of Russia from 24 January 1992 – 6 June 1992; Viktor Barannikova (Russian: Баранников, Виктор Павлович; 20 October 1940, Fedosyevka, Pozharsky District, Primorsky Krai, USSR – 21 July 1995, Moscow), who was the first deputy minister of security of Russia from 24 January 1992 to 27 July 1993.

== Poisoning and death ==
A bald Litvinenko at University College Hospital

On 1 November 2006, Litvinenko suddenly fell ill. On 3 November, he was admitted to Barnet General Hospital in London. He was then moved to University College Hospital for intensive care. His illness was later attributed to poisoning with radionuclide polonium-210 after the Health Protection Agency found significant amounts of the rare and highly toxic element in his body.

Litvinenko met with two former agents early on the day he fell ill – Dmitry Kovtun and Andrey Lugovoy, in the Pine Bar of the Millennium Hotel where high polonium contamination was found. Though both denied any wrongdoing, a leaked U.S. diplomatic cable revealed that Kovtun had left polonium traces in the house and car he had used in Hamburg. Before his meeting with Kovtun and Lugovoy, Litvinenko had lunch at Itsu, a sushi restaurant on Piccadilly in London with Italian acquaintance Mario Scaramella. Scaramella claimed to have information on the assassination of Anna Politkovskaya, a journalist who had been shot dead in the elevator of her Moscow apartment building three weeks prior.

On his deathbed, Litvinenko claimed that Putin had directly ordered his assassination. After his death, Marina Litvinenko, his widow, accused Moscow of orchestrating the murder. Though she believes the order did not come from Putin himself, she does believe it was done at the behest of the authorities, and announced that she would refuse to provide evidence to any Russian investigation out of fear that it would be misused or misrepresented. In a court hearing in London in 2015, a Scotland Yard lawyer concluded that "the evidence suggests that the only credible explanation is in one way or another the Russian state is involved in Litvinenko's murder".

=== Death and final statement ===
Before his death, Litvinenko said: "You may succeed in silencing one man but the howl of protest from around the world, Mr. Putin, will reverberate in your ears for the rest of your life." On 22 November 2006, Litvinenko's medical team at University College Hospital reported Litvinenko had suffered a "major setback" due to either heart failure or an overnight heart attack. He died on 23 November. The following day, Putin publicly stated: "Mr Litvinenko is, unfortunately, not Lazarus".

Scotland Yard stated that inquiries into the circumstances of how Litvinenko became ill would continue.

On 24 November 2006, a statement was released posthumously, in which Litvinenko named Putin as the man behind his poisoning. Litvinenko's friend Alex Goldfarb, who was also the chairman of Boris Berezovsky's Civil Liberties Fund, claimed Litvinenko had dictated it to him three days earlier. Andrei Nekrasov said his friend Litvinenko and Litvinenko's lawyer had composed the statement in Russian on 21 November and translated it to English.

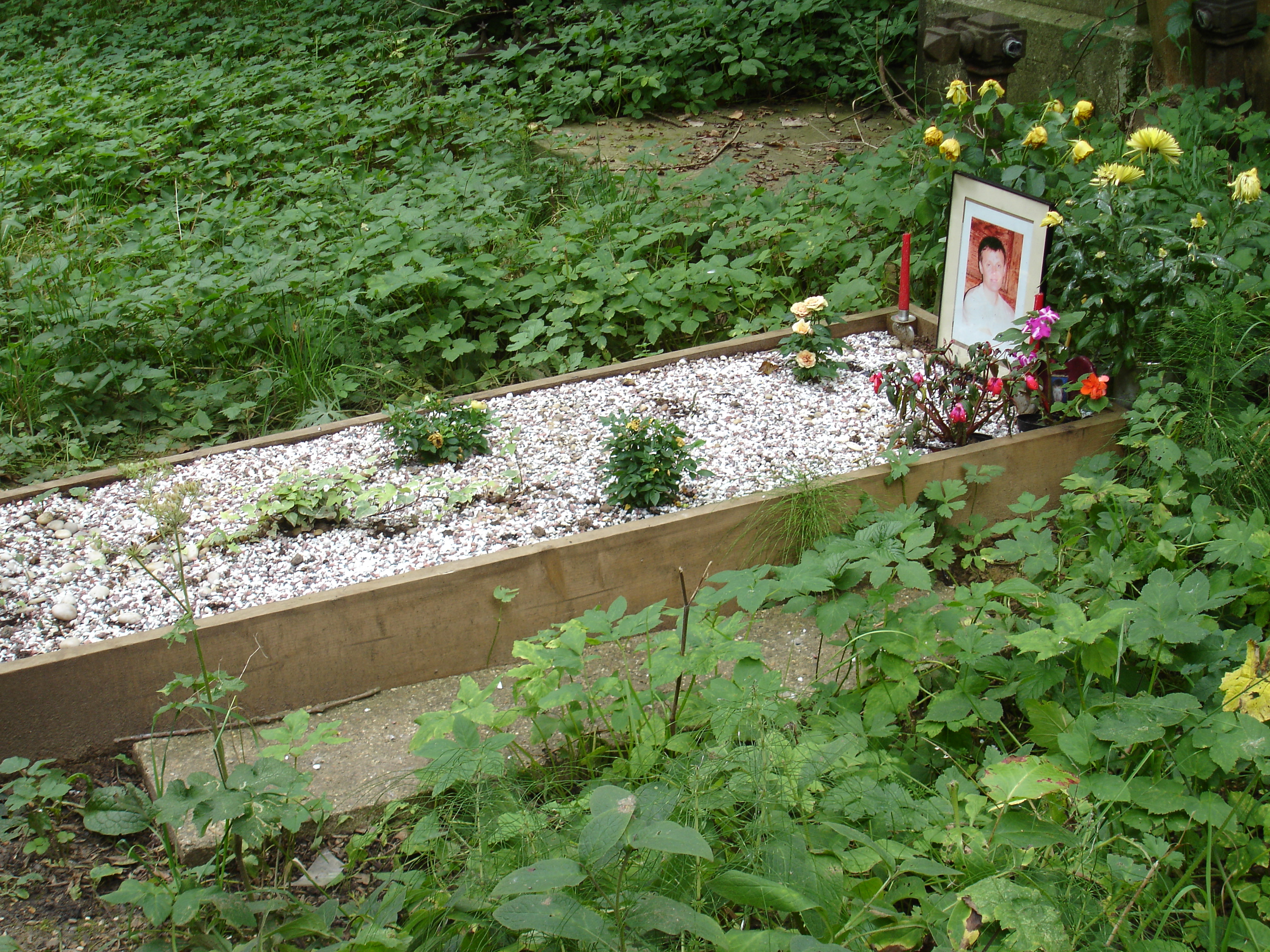
Litvinenko's grave at Highgate Cemetery in 2007

Goldfarb later stated that Litvinenko, on his deathbed, had instructed him to write a note "in good English" in which Putin was to be accused of his poisoning. Goldfarb also stated that he read the note to Litvinenko in English and Russian and Litvinenko agreed "with every word of it" and signed it.

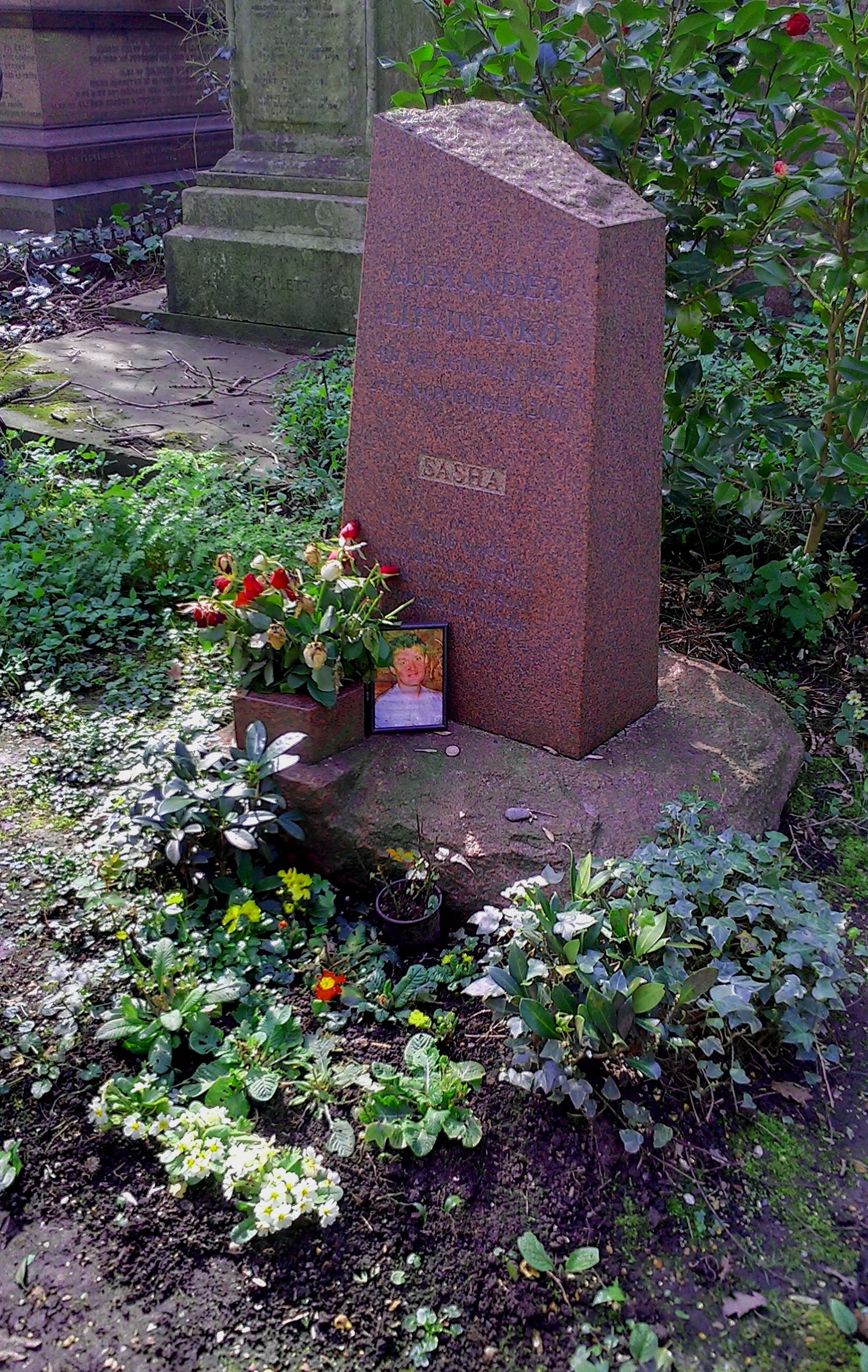
Litvinenko's grave in 2017

His autopsy took place on 1 December at the Royal London Hospital's institute of pathology. It was attended by Dr Benjamin Swift and Dr Nathaniel Cary, as well as a third chosen by the family. Litvinenko was buried at Highgate Cemetery (West side) in north London on 7 December. The police treated his death as a murder, although the London coroner's inquest was yet to be completed.

In an interview with the BBC broadcast on 16 December 2006, Yuri Shvets said that Litvinenko had created a 'due diligence' report investigating the activities of an unnamed senior Kremlin official on behalf of a British company looking to invest "dozens of millions of dollars" in a project in Russia, and that the dossier contained damaging information about the senior Kremlin official. He said he was interviewed about his allegations by Scotland Yard detectives investigating Litvinenko's murder. British media reported that the poisoning and consequent death of Litvinenko was not widely covered in the Russian news media.

=== Funeral ===
On 7 December 2006, Litvinenko’s body was placed in a metal capsule then the coffin was sealed, then buried at Highgate Cemetery with Christian, Jewish and Muslim rites, including a Christian and Muslim prayer being said by an imam and Orthodox priest in line with Litvinenko's wishes of a non-denominational service at the grave. The funeral ceremony was followed by a private memorial at which the ensemble Tonus Peregrinus sang sacred music by Russian composers Igor Stravinsky, Sergei Rachmaninov, Victor Kalinnikov, and three works by British composer Antony Pitts.

=== Investigations into death ===
==== UK criminal investigation ====
On 20 January 2007, British police announced that they had "identified the man they believe poisoned Alexander Litvinenko. The suspected killer was captured on cameras at Heathrow as he flew into Britain to carry out the murder." The man in question was introduced to Litvinenko as "Vladislav".

As of 26 January 2007, British officials said police had solved the murder of Litvinenko. They discovered "a 'hot' teapot at London's Millennium Hotel with an off-the-charts reading for polonium-210, the radioactive material used in the killing." In addition, a senior official said investigators had concluded the murder of Litvinenko was "a 'state-sponsored' assassination orchestrated by Russian security services." The police went to charge former Russian spy Andrei Lugovoy, who met Litvinenko on 1 November 2006, the day officials believe the lethal dose of polonium-210 was administered.

On the same day, The Guardian reported that the British government was preparing an extradition request asking that Andrei Lugovoy be returned to the UK to stand trial for Litvinenko's murder. On 22 May 2007, the Crown Prosecution Service called for the extradition of Russian citizen Andrei Lugovoy to the UK on charges of murder. Lugovoy dismissed the claims against him as "politically motivated" and said he did not kill Litvinenko.

A British police investigation resulted in several suspects for the murder, but in May 2007, the British Director of Public Prosecutions, Ken Macdonald, announced that his government would seek to extradite Andrei Lugovoy, the chief suspect in the case, from Russia. On 28 May 2007, the British Foreign Office officially submitted a request to the Government of Russia for the extradition of Lugovoy to face criminal charges in the UK.

On 2 October 2011, The Sunday Times published an article wherein the chief prosecutor who investigated the murder of Litvinenko, Lord Macdonald of River Glaven, publicly spoke of his suspicion that the murder was a "state directed execution" carried out by Russia. Until that time, British public officials had stopped short of directly accusing Russia of involvement in the poisoning. "It had all the hallmarks of a state directed execution, committed on the streets of London by a foreign government," Macdonald added.

In January 2015, it was reported in the British media that the National Security Agency had intercepted communications between Russian government agents in Moscow and those who carried out what was called a "state execution" in London: the recorded conversations allegedly proved that the Russian government was involved in Litvinenko's murder, and suggested that the motive was Litvinenko's revelations about Vladimir Putin's links with the criminal underworld. On 21 January 2016, the Home Office published The Litvinenko Inquiry: Report into Litvinenko's death.

==== Russian criminal investigation ====
Many publications in Russian media suggested that the death of Alexander Litvinenko was connected to Boris Berezovsky. Former FSB chief Nikolay Kovalyov, for whom Litvinenko worked, said that the incident "looks like the hand of Boris Berezovsky. I am sure that no kind of intelligence services participated." This involvement of Berezovsky was alleged by numerous Russian television shows. Kremlin supporters saw it as a conspiracy to smear the Russian government's reputation by engineering a spectacular murder of a Russian dissident abroad.

After Litvinenko's death, traces of polonium-210 were found in an office belonging to Berezovsky. This was unsurprising: Litvinenko had visited Berezovsky's office as well as many other places in the hours after his poisoning. The British Health Protection Agency made extensive efforts to ensure that locations Litvinenko visited and anyone who had contact with Litvinenko after his poisoning were not at risk.

Russian authorities claimed they were unable to question Berezovsky. The Russian Foreign Ministry complained that Britain was obstructing its attempt to send prosecutors to London to interview more than 100 people, including Berezovsky. The Times reported "Mr Darling made it clear that the British Government was willing to grant permission for the Russian team to visit."

On 5 July 2007, the British ambassador to Russia, Anne Pringle, claimed that London had submitted sufficient evidence to extradite Lugovoy to Britain.

== Judicial inquiries ==
Logo of the inquiry

=== Inquest in London ===
On 13 October 2011, Dr. Andrew Reid, the Coroner of St. Pancras, announced that he would hold an inquest into Litvinenko's death, which would include the examination of all existing theories of the murder, including possible complicity of the Russian government. The inquest, held by Sir Robert Owen, a High Court judge acting as the coroner, originally scheduled to start on 1 May 2013, was subject to a series of pre-hearings: firstly, the coroner agreed that a group representing Russian state prosecutors could be accepted as a party to the inquest process; secondly, the British Government submitted a Public Interest Immunity (PII) certificate. Under Public Interest Immunity (PII) claims, the information at the disposal of the British government relating to Russian state involvement, as well as how much British intelligence services could have done to prevent the death, would be excluded from the inquest.

On 12 July 2013, Sir Robert, who had previously agreed to exclude certain material from the inquest on the grounds its disclosure could be damaging to national security, announced that the British Government refused the request he had made earlier in June to replace the inquest with a public inquiry, which would have powers to consider secret evidence. After the hearing, Alex Goldfarb said: "There's some sort of collusion behind the scenes with Her Majesty's government and the Kremlin to obstruct justice"; Elena Tsirlina, Mrs Litvinenko's solicitor, concurred with him.

On 22 July 2014, the British Home Secretary Theresa May, who had previously ruled out an inquiry on the grounds it might damage the country's relations with Moscow, announced a public inquiry into Litvinenko's death. The inquiry was chaired by Sir Robert Owen who was the Coroner in the inquest into Litvinenko's death; its remit stipulated that "the inquiry will not address the question of whether the UK authorities could or should have taken steps which would have prevented the death". The inquiry started on 27 January 2015. New evidence emerged at first hearings held at the end of January 2015. The last day of hearings was on 31 July 2015.

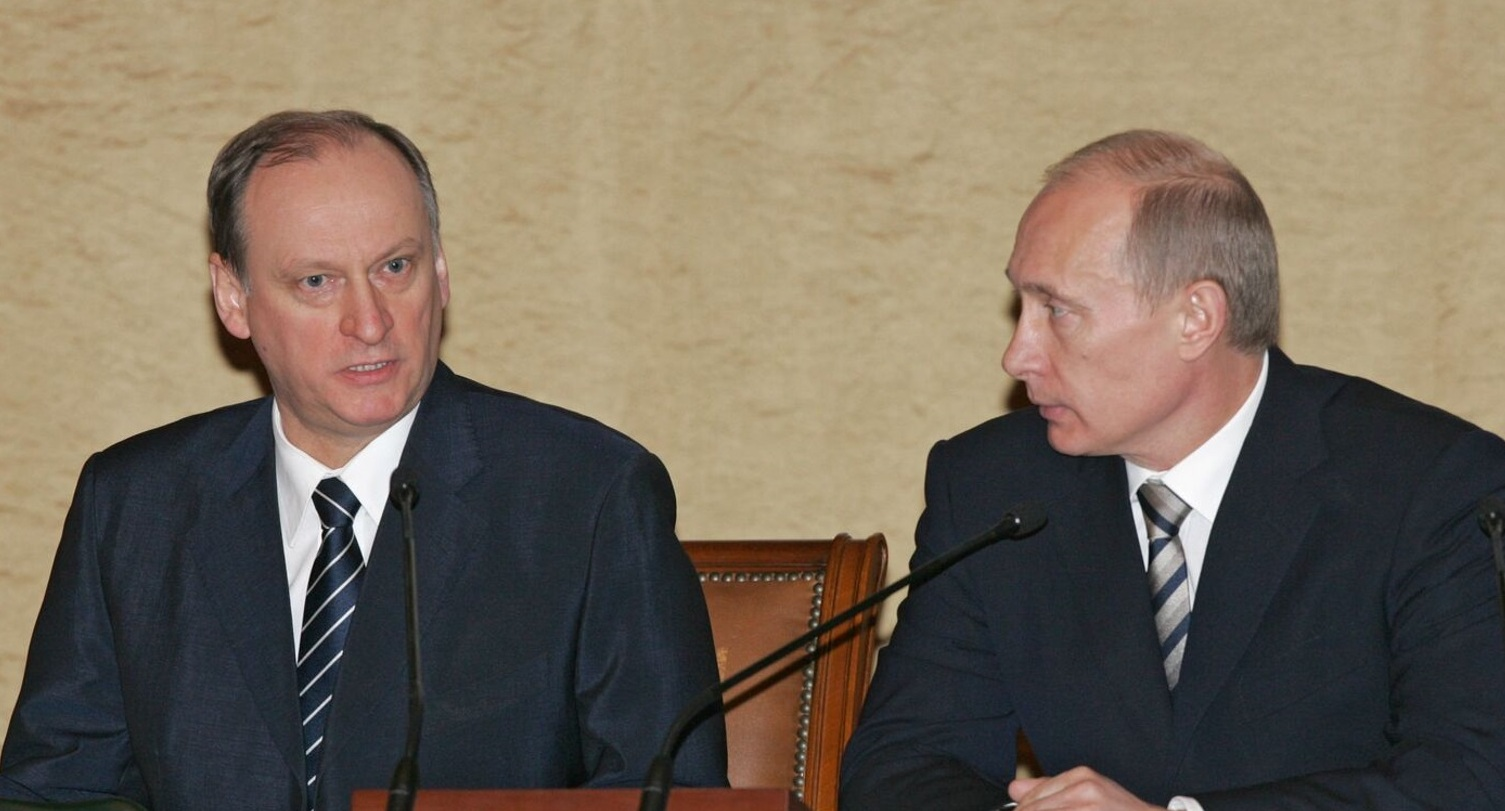
The report stated that the FSB operation to kill Litvinenko was probably approved by Nikolai Patrushev (left) and Vladimir Putin

The inquiry report was released on 21 January 2016. The report found that Litvinenko was killed by two Russian agents, Andrei Lugovoi and Dmitry Kovtun and that there was a "strong probability" they were acting on behalf of the Russian FSB secret service. Paragraph 10.6 of the report stated: "The FSB operation to kill Mr Litvinenko was probably approved by Mr Patrushev and also by President Putin."

The report outlined five possible motives for the murder: a belief Litvinenko had betrayed the FSB through public disclosures about its work; a belief that he was working for British intelligence; because he was a prominent associate of leading opponents of Mr Putin and his regime, including Mr Boris Berezovsky and Akhmed Zakayev; because his claims about the FSB were "areas of particular sensitivity to the Putin administration", including a plot to murder dissident Boris Berezovsky; and because there was "undoubtedly a personal dimension to the antagonism" between Litvinenko and Putin, culminating in his allegation that Putin was a paedophile.

On the release of the report, British Prime Minister David Cameron condemned Putin for presiding over "state sponsored murder". British Labour MP Ian Austin said: "Putin is an unreconstructed KGB thug and gangster who murders his opponents in Russia and, as we know, on the streets of London – and nothing announced today is going to make the blindest bit of difference." The Kremlin dismissed the Inquiry as "a joke" and "whitewash".

The same day, British Home Secretary Theresa May announced that assets belonging to both Lugovoi and Kovtun would be immediately frozen and that the Metropolitan Police were seeking their extradition. The Russian Ambassador was also summoned by the British Foreign Secretary Philip Hammond and demands were made that Russia cooperate with the investigation into Mr Litvinenko's murder with Foreign Office minister David Liddington asserting that Russia had demonstrated "a flagrant disregard for UK law, international law and standards of conduct, and the safety of UK citizens" However, the government's response to the inquiry's results has been described by The Economist as consisting of "tough talk and little action".

=== Carter v Russia ===
In May 2007 Marina Litvinenko (also known as Maria Anna Carter) registered a complaint against the Russian Federation in the European Court of Human Rights (ECHR) in Strasbourg, accusing the Russian state of violating her husband's right to life, and failing to conduct a full investigation. On 21 September 2021, a chamber of the court found Russia responsible for Litvinenko's death and ordered the country to pay 100,000 euros in damages. Russia can still appeal the decision to the Grand Chamber. The ECHR also found beyond reasonable doubt that Andrey Lugovoy and Dmitry Kovtun killed Litvinenko. Commenting on the case, law professor Marko Milanovic thought it was unlikely that Russian government would pay the damages.

== In popular culture ==
- Rebellion: the Litvinenko Case (also known as Poisoned by Polonium) is a documentary about Litvinenko's activities and death.
- The Litvinenko Project is a live-performance devised by 2Magpies Theatre (Nottingham, UK) exploring the possibilities which lead to Litvinenko's poisoning
- A Very Expensive Poison: The Definitive Story of the Murder of Litvinenko and Russia's War with the West is a nonfiction book by Luke Harding published in 2016 by Guardian Faber Publishing.
- An episode of BuzzFeed Unsolved about his death aired in August 2018.
- A Very Expensive Poison is a play by Lucy Prebble based on the book by Luke Harding, that had its world premiere at The Old Vic Theatre in London in 2019.
- Season 1, named "The Litvinenko Affair" of the Wondery Podcast series, British Scandal, covered this story over 5 episodes in 2021, the final episode containing an interview with Luke Harding.
- An opera The Life and Death of Alexander Litvinenko by Anthony Bolton, with libretto by Kit Hesketh-Harvey, had its world premiere on 15 July 2021 at Grange Park Opera.
- Patriots is a play by Peter Morgan that premiered at the Almeida Theatre in London in 2022, starring Jamael Westman as Alexander Litvinenko.
- A 2022 4-part television series, Litvinenko (written by George Kay, writer of Lupin and Criminal, and directed by Jim Field Smith) was created with the permission and involvement of Marina Litvinenko. The script was based on extensive research and interviews. David Tennant played Alexander and Margarita Levieva played Marina.

== See also ==
- Natalya Estemirova
- Sergei Magnitsky
- Stanislav Markelov and Anastasia Baburova
- Poisoning of Alexei Navalny
- Assassination of Boris Nemtsov
- Badri Patarkatsishvili
- Assassination of Anna Politkovskaya
- Yuri Shchekochikhin
- Poisoning of Sergei and Yulia Skripal
- Roman Tsepov
- Sergei Yushenkov
- List of journalists killed in Russia
- Zersetzung (decomposition)

== His books ==
- Alexander Litvinenko, Yuri Felshtinsky, Blowing Up Russia: The Secret Plot to Bring Back KGB Terror Encounter Books, New York, 2007 ISBN 978-1594032011
- Yuri Felshtinsky, Alexander Litvinenko, and Geoffrey Andrews. Blowing up Russia: Terror from within Gibson Square Books, London, 2007, ISBN 978-1903933954
- Alexander Litvinenko: "Allegations – Selected Works by Alexander Litvinenko", translated from Russian and edited by Pavel Stroilov, introduction by Vladimir Bukovsky, Publisher: Aquilion (2007), ISBN 978-1-904997-05-4
- A. Litvinenko and A. Goldfarb. Criminal gang from Lubyanka(in Russian) GRANI, New York, 2002, ISBN 978-0972387804
  - А. Литвиненко Лубянская преступная группировка (in Russian) GRANI, New York, 2002, ISBN 0972387803
- A documentary film, Assassination of Russia was made by French producers based on books by Litvinenko. He was a consultant for the movie.

== Books and films about Litvinenko ==
- Litvinenko, 4-part series available on Netflix, 2022, airing August 2024. Stars David Tennant of Doctor Who fame as Sasha / Alexander Litvinenko.
- Alan Cowell. The Terminal Spy: A True Story of Espionage, Betrayal and Murder, Random House, 2008. ISBN 978-0739370544
- William Dunkerley. The Phony Litvinenko Murder, Omnicom Press, 2011. ISBN 978-0615559018
- Alex Goldfarb and Marina Litvinenko. Death of a Dissident: The Poisoning of Alexander Litvinenko and the Return of the KGB. Free Press, New York, 2007. ISBN 978-1416551652.
- Luke Harding. A Very Expensive Poison: The Assassination of Alexander Litvinenko and Putin's War with the West, Vintage Books, 2017. ISBN 978-0615559018
- Litvinenko, Marina (5 November 2026). A Life in Fragments: Our Love, His Murder, My Resistance. Bloomsbury Publishing. ISBN 978-1-5266-9639-7.
- Andrei Nekrasov. Rebellion: the Litvinenko Case, 2007, Dreamscanner. Banned in Russia. Official site: A Very Russian Murder.
- Martin Sixsmith. The Litvinenko File: the True Story of a Death Foretold, Publisher: Macmillan (2007) ISBN 978-0230531543
- Boris Volodarsky. The KGB's Poison Factory: From Lenin to Litvinenko, Pen & Sword/Frontline Books, 2009. ISBN 978-1848325425
