= Anatoly Trofimov =

KGB officer

Anatoly Vasilyevich Trofimov (Russian: Анато́лий Васи́льевич Трофи́мов; July 14, 1940 – April 10, 2005) was a head of the Soviet KGB investigation department. He personally supervised all Soviet dissident cases including Sergei Kovalyov, Gleb Yakunin, Alexey Smirnov, and Yuri Orlov. He was later a deputy director of the Russian Federal Security Service and became a mentor and supervisor of Alexander Litvinenko. He was assassinated in April 2005 by unidentified gunmen in Moscow.

== Career ==
=== Soviet Union ===
As a deputy head of the investigation department of the Moscow branch of the Soviet KGB secret service, Trofimov supervised all cases of dissidents including Sergei Kovalyov, Gleb Yakunin, Alexey Smirnov, and Yuri Orlov.

=== Russia ===
Trofimov was regarded as an incorruptible serviceman loyal to Boris Yeltsin. He arrested several top politicians opposing Boris Yeltsin during the 1993 Russian constitutional crisis. Later he held offices of the Deputy Director of the Russian Counter-Intelligence service (FSK), and head of the FSB secret service for the Moscow region until February 1997 when he was fired.

== His comments ==
- "A retired army general and a leader of Communist parliamentary opposition Lev Rokhlin was killed by the Russian secret services, and Putin will have to cover this up", according to Trofimov.
- According to Marina Litvinenko, he said to Alexander Litvinenko: "Don't you see? They killed Rokhlin; surely that was a Kontora job. Now the guy who came in [Putin] will have to cover that up. He cannot afford to solve the case. It is like an insurance policy".

== Romano Prodi ==
In October 1999 a scandal broke out in Italy about the alleged KGB connection of Romano Prodi, the Italian centre-left leader, former Prime Minister of Italy and former President of the European Commission. The information about Prodi was provided by Soviet defector Vasili Mitrokhin. Litvinenko claims he was given this information by Trofimov, whom allegedly described Prodi as "our man in Italy".

== Assassination ==
On April 10, 2005, Trofimov was gunned down in Moscow while driving a car, together with his wife. His four-year-old daughter survived the assassination.

Litvinenko, who knew Trofimov personally, told the media that he believed Trofimov's killing was a political assassination, and that Trofimov had opposed both the Second Chechen War and the earlier appointment of Vladimir Putin as FSB chief.
