= Generic Drug Enforcement Act =

United States law on generic drugs

Generic Drug Enforcement Act of 1992
- Long title: An Act to authorize the Secretary of Health and Human Services to impose debarments and to take other action to ensure the integrity of abbreviated drug applications under the Federal Food, Drug, and Cosmetic Act, and for other purposes
- Enacted by: the 102nd United States Congress

Citations
- Public law: Pub. L. 102–282
- Statutes at Large: 106 Stat. 149

Legislative history
- Introduced in the House of Representatives as H.R. 2454 by John Dingell (D‑MI); Passed the House of Representatives on October 31, 1991 (413-0); Passed the Senate on April 10, 1992 (without objection) with amendment; House agreed to Senate amendment on April 28, 1992 (without objection); Signed into law by President George H. W. Bush on May 13, 1992

The Generic Drug Enforcement Act is a United States federal statute enacted by the 102nd United States Congress and signed into law by President George H. W. Bush on May 13, 1992. It allows the Secretary of Health and Human Services to engage in debarment of individuals convicted of felony crimes that corrupt the drug regulation process.

== Provisions ==
The Generic Drug Enforcement Act was passed in response to scandals of generic drug manufacturers bribing FDA officials to expedite drug approval using falsified data. This statute amended the Federal Food, Drug, and Cosmetic Act of 1938 to provide empower the Secretary of Health and Human Services to engage in debarment of individuals convicted of felony crimes that corrupt the drug regulation process. Debarred individuals are effectively blacklisted from the pharmaceutical industry, as they cannot participate in development of drugs submitted for approval by the Food and Drug Administration (FDA).

Health and Human Services Secretary Louis W. Sullivan supported debarment for individuals convicted of felonies related to the development or approval of any product subject to FDA regulation, but Representative John Dingell (D‑MI) narrowed the proposed legislation's scope to only generic drugs. The law was worded to omit the word "penalty" to avoid triggering the Double Jeopardy Clause in imposing a secondary effect of felony convictions.

Additionally, the Generic Drug Enforcement Act introduced civil fines for making false statements to the Department of Health and Human Services, and it allowed the Secretary of Health and Human Services to withdraw fraudulent applications seeking approval of generic drugs. The decision to continue the Drug Price Competition and Patent Term Restoration Act's system of only assessing a generic drug's bioequivalence to its brand name counterpart, rather than confirming efficacy, was highly controversial.

== Application ==
In 2008, Representative Joe Barton of the House Committee on Energy and Commerce criticized the FDA for its minimal application of debarment as a penalty on individuals and companies engaged in pharmaceutical fraud. During the first 15 years after its enactment, the law was never used to debar a generic drug company and the agency has been progressively reducing its debarment of individuals.
