= International Foundation for Civil Liberties =

The International Foundation for Civil Liberties (Russian: Международный фонд гражданских свобод) is a non-profit organization established by the Russian-British oligarch Boris Berezovsky in November 2000. The foundation is headquartered in New York City and headed by Alexander Goldfarb. The stated mission of the foundation is "to provide financial, legal, informational and logistical resources to secure human rights and civil liberties in Russia."

== History ==
The first grant of the foundation ($3 million) was given as an endowment for the Andrei Sakharov Museum and Civic Center in Moscow. The grant was accepted by Sakharov's widow Elena Bonner. By May 2001, 160 more grants have been awarded by the foundation to NGOs which claim to be engaged in "human rights protection across Russia" including Committees of Soldiers' Mothers, a network labeled as a "foreign agent" by the Russian government. Among other IFCL projects in Russia, observers noted support of anti-government journalists, soldiers and funding lawyers to defend youth offenders.

As part of its campaign to highlight violations of human rights in Chechnya, jointly with British-based Amnesty International and the International Helsinki Federation, IFCL sponsored screening of documentaries on the Chechen War around the world. and took out full-page advertisements in international press criticising the human rights record of president Vladimir Putin. IFCL promoted the film Assassination of Russia, which forwards a conspiracy theory that the FSB security service staged the Moscow apartment bombings as a false flag, which led to the Second Chechen war.

On the eve of the 2006 meeting of G8 Club of industrial nations in St. Petersburg, IFCL launched mocking advertisements depicting Vladimir Putin as Groucho Marx. Among their other activities, they paid legal expenses of the Chechen separatist leader Akhmed Zakayev in his successful bid against extradition request from Russia. They have been a major sponsor of transcribing the so-called Kuchma tapes—recordings in the office of the Ukrainian president made by Major Mykola Melnychenko and contributed at least $21 million to Ukrainian opposition in support of the Orange Revolution. They supported Alexander Litvinenko through a resettlement grant that paid for rent of his two-bedroom apartment in UK. Their director Alex Goldfarb who had arranged Litvinenko’s defection from Moscow in 2000 became prominent as a spokesman for Litvinenko after his poisoning and death.

After the killing of Alexander Litvinenko, probably authorized by the Kremlin, IFCL seems to have folded down its public activities. The foundation's web site has not been updated since 2006.

== Criticism ==
Amelia Gentleman of The Guardian quoted acting director of Memorial society Elena Zhimkova concerning the possibility of abusing the fund by its director to resolve "personal issues".

Konstantin Chaplin claimed that Berezovsky sponsored pickets in Voronezh against an organization that, according to Chaplin, protects interests of Russian people, protects historic rights of Eastern Orthodox Church and has merits in state building.

An author by initials AIA referred to an article in Komsomolskaya Pravda implying that the Foundation undermines the state of Russia. The article quoted a Moscow State University professor Vladimir Dobrenkov and a political analyst Sergei Markov stating that civil liberty defenders can overthrow the Russian government and thus help Western powers gain access to Russia's raw materials.

An article in The Guardian stated that unnamed critics accuse the foundation in "bankroll[ing] widespread opposition to Mr Putin". The article said that some activists refused grants from the foundation while others accepted them.

== See also ==
- Human Rights Watch
- United Nations Human Rights Council
- Amnesty International
- Second Chechen War
- ACLU
