= Oleksandr Tretiakov =

Ukrainian politician

Oleksandr Tretiakov Олександр Юрійович Третьяков
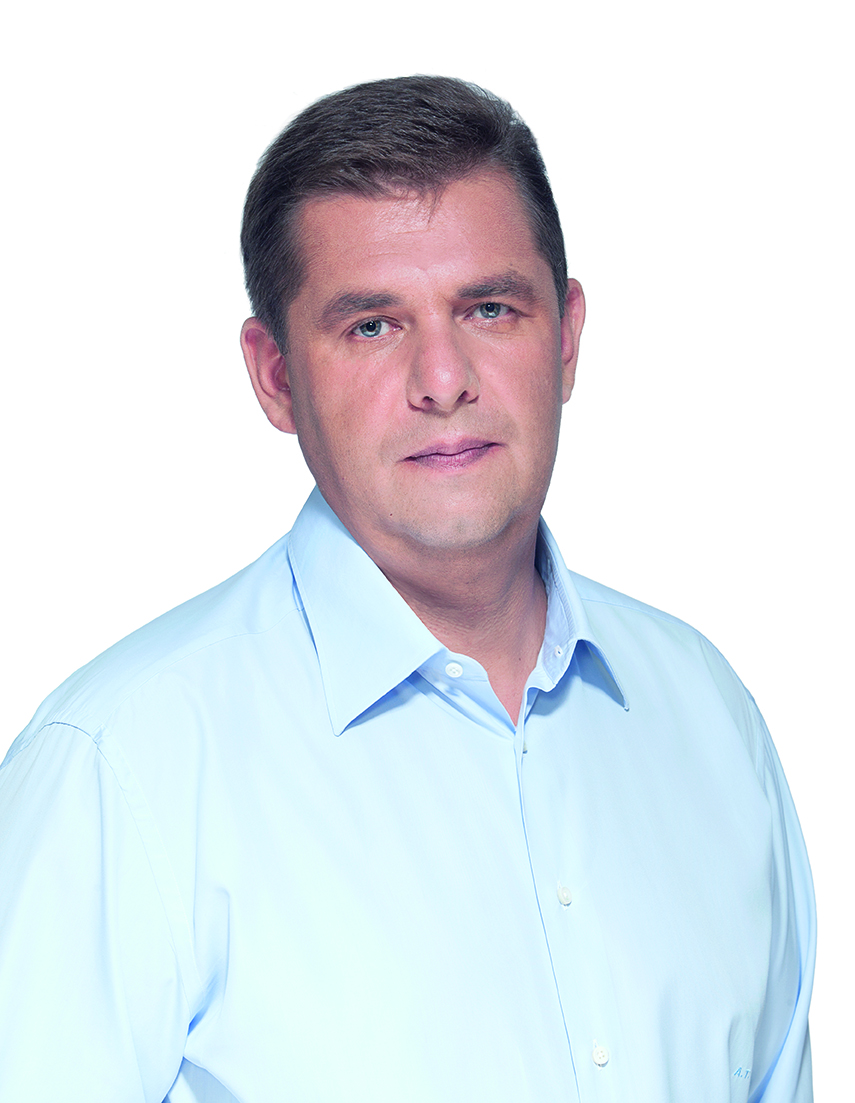

Verkhovna Rada of Ukraine deputy of the 4th, 5th, 6th, and 8th convocations

Chairman of the Verkhovna Rada Committee on veterans, combatants, participants in the anti-terrorist operation and people with disabilities

Personal details
- Born: Oleksandr Yuriyovych Tretiakov; 20 March 1970 (age 55) Kyiv
- Spouse: Alla Tretyakova
- Children: Daria, Egor, Daniil

Oleksandr Yuriyovych Tretiakov (Ukrainian: Олександр Юрійович Третьяков; born 20 March 1970) is a Ukrainian politician and statesman, People's Deputy of Ukraine of the 4th, 5th, 6th, and 8th convocations. Chairman of the Verkhovna Rada Committee on veterans, combatants, participants in the anti-terrorist operation and people with disabilities (from the end of 2014). Since June 2015 is a deputy head of the parliamentary faction of the political party Petro Poroshenko Bloc. Head of the Cabinet of the President of Ukraine (2005). Tretyakov lost his seat in the Rada in the 2019 Ukrainian parliamentary elections.

== Early life ==
He was born in Kyiv on 20 March 1970.

1987-1992: study at Kyiv Higher Radio Engineering Academy of Air Defense.

1992-1994: service in the Armed Forces of Ukraine. Discharged with the rank of senior lieutenant.

== Business career ==
After receiving higher education Oleksandr Tretyakov starts own business. From 1995 to 2002 he was the president of ATEK-95, one of the major oil trading companies in Ukraine. Oleksandr Tretyakov’s business interests also include real estate and media.

In 2006 Oleksandr founded Glavred Media, a media holding which included the most influential Ukrainian information agency UNIAN, Glavred magazine and website, Profile and Telecity magazines, Nova and Izvestiya v Ukraine (eng. News in Ukraine) newspapers, Telekritika (eng. Telecritics) website, and City TV channel. Ihor Kolomoyskyi, one of the top Ukrainian businessmen and a co-owner of Privat Group, becomes Oleksandr’s business partner in the media holding. The establishment of the holding was officially announced in August 2007. At the beginning of 2010, after Viktor Yanukovych won the presidential election, Tretiakov sells all his media assets.

== Political career ==
In 2002 Oleksandr entered politics and became actively engaged with it. He was elected a Member of the Verkhovna Rada of Ukraine from the People's Movement of Ukraine (Narodnyi Rukh Ukrajiny) of "Nasha Ukrayina" ("Our Ukraine") faction (number 41 on the party list). He was a member of the People's Movement of Ukraine.

Oleksandr Tretyakov becomes one of the closest confidants to the opposition leader Viktor Yushchenko, and for a long time he was in the inner circle of the future President and subsequently the Head of the State. He was also one of financial sponsors of Our Ukraine opposition faction.

In the summer of 2004, when the election campaign headquarters of the presidential candidate Yushchenko is formed, Tretiakov is appointed deputy head of the headquarters, managing organizational and financial issues. During the Orange Revolution he was a member of the Committee of National Salvation. Many media sources have mentioned the politician as one of the sponsors of the Orange Revolution.

In the autumn of 2004, after poisoning of presidential candidate Viktor Yushchenko, he accompanied Yushchenko during his medical treatment in Austria. From September 2004 to the very day of inauguration in January 2005, Viktor Yushchenko and his family lived in Oleksandr Tretyakov’s house because of security concerns.

After inauguration, on 27 January 2005 by one of his first decrees the newly elected President Viktor Yushchenko appoints Oleksandr Tretyakov as his First Assistant – Head of the Cabinet of the President of Ukraine. Tretyakov holds this office until December 2005, during this period introduces the structural reform of the Presidential Secretariat. In March 2005 he becomes one of the founders of Our Ukraine political party, he was actively engaged in party building, being responsible for party organization, media and financial issues. The politician believed that the Yushchenko – Tymoshenko ‘orange team’ should run for the 2006 parliamentary election as a single bloc.

In 2005-2006 Tretyakov was a member of the supervisory board of Ukrnafta, Oschadbank, and Ukrtelecom.

In September 2005, during political crisis in Ukraine that broke out after public accusations of President Yushchenko’s closest aides in corruption, Tretyakov asked the President to suspend him from his position for the time of investigation. At the same time Victor Yushchenko dismissed the Prime Minister Yulia Tymoshenko and the entire government, as also the Secretary of the National Security and Defense Council Petro Poroshenko. In September 2005 the President eliminated the office of the First Assistant to the President, announcing it during his speech at the Verkhovna Rada of Ukraine on the day of voting on Yurii Yekhanurov’s appointment as the Prime Minister of Ukraine.

Later, in September–October 2005 an interdepartmental inquiry panel announced that no evidence proving the claims of corruption and no instances of abuse of power were found; in autumn 2005 and March 2006, two interim inquiry panels of the Verkhovna Rada of Ukraine have also confirmed that the accusations were groundless.

Tretyakov won lawsuits in courts of all instances, seeking protection of honor and dignity (on 25 November 2005 Pechersk District Court of Kyiv found groundless all corruption charges brought against him. On 10 July 2006 Kyiv Court of Appeal upheld this judgement).

In December 2005 Tretyakov became an external Presidential Adviser, holding this position until October 2006 when he resigned due to disagreement with the personnel policies of the President.

In March 2006 the politician was elected to the Verkhovna Rada of Ukraine of the 5th convocation (number 41 on the party list). In the spring of 2007 as part of a group consisting of 150 deputies wrote a letter of request for early resignation, which allowed President Yushchenko to dissolve the parliament and appoint early election of the Verkhovna Rada of Ukraine.

At the early parliamentary elections in October 2007 Oleksandr Tretyakov for the third time became a Member of Parliament from Our Ukraine - "Narodna Samooborona"'s (People's Self-Defense Bloc party) list, running from "Nasha Ukrayina" ("Our Ukraine" party) (number 56 on the list).

During his term at the Verkhovna Rada of Ukraine of the 6th convocation he held the office of Deputy Head of Our Ukraine - People's Self-Defense (OU-PSD) faction and the First Deputy Chairman of the Committee for Transport and Communication.

Tretyakov is a strong supporter of the democratic coalition and one of the key lobbyists of formation of the OU-PSD – YTB (Yulia Tymoshenko Bloc) coalition in December 2007 and the OU-PSD – YTB – Lytvyn Bloc in November 2008.

During his term at the Verkhovna Rada of Ukraine of the 4th, 5th, and 6th convocations he participated in creation of the Inter-Parliamentary Assembly of the Verkhovna Rada of Ukraine and the Seimas of the Republic of Lithuania, and served as the Assembly’s Co-chairman from Ukraine.

In February 2010, on the eve of the second round of the presidential election, Tretyakov severed himself from "Our Ukraine" in protest against the introduction of amendments to the Law on Election of the President of Ukraine, when the election commission formation rules were changed just a few days before the voting day, thus creating conditions for election fraud. At that time, some MPs from Our Ukraine party of the OU-PSD faction have voted, along with the Party of Regions, for the amended law and President Yushchenko signed it.

After Viktor Yanukovych won presidential election Oleksandr Tretiakov went into opposition.

== Political career after 2012 ==
At the parliamentary elections in 2012 he ran as a non-party self-nominee in the people's deputies of Ukraine in the Kyiv district (Svyatoshinsky district). According to the voting results, he took the 2nd place losing to the candidate from the "Batkivschyna"("Fatherland") party Volodymyr Ariev.

In 2013-2014, he actively supported Evromaydan, bought some 500 bullet-proof vests, thousands of bags for barricade construction, tents, sleeping bags, clothes, etc. The Tretyakov's office in Podol hosted protesters for heating and overnight stay, activists from the Right Sector, militiamen from Lviv region and other activists. Since the beginning of the war in Donbass has bought ammunition for volunteer battalions in the power operation zone, provided financial support to families of participants in the power operation from Svyatoshinsky district of Kyiv.

In the 2014 parliamentary election Tretyakov was again re-elected after again winning single-member districts number 219 in Kyiv; this time as a Petro Poroshenko Bloc candidate.

In the Verkhovna Rada of the 8th convocation he heads the Committee on veterans, combatants, participants in the anti-terrorist operation and people with disabilities. In his first legislative initiatives, he raised issues of ensuring adequate social protection for participants in the power operation in Donbass, volunteers, members of volunteer formations, the provision of appropriate statuses for combatants, participants in the war, war invalids The Committee recommended the adoption of the Law on Amendments to the Law of Ukraine "On the Status of War Veterans, the Guarantees for their Social Protection," which defined the separate status of "The Affected Participant of the Dignity Revolution", and regulated the benefits and guarantees for their social protection. This law was signed by the President of Ukraine on November 21 (посмотрите в тексте: 21 ноября какого года? Там не понятно).

He supports the creation of the Ministry of Veterans Affairs in Ukraine similar to the existing departments in the US, Canada, Australia, Croatia and other countries: "We need to urgently develop an effective mechanism for the implementation of social protection in this area and create a government body that will be responsible for the effective implementation of state strategy for the social protection of veterans", Tretyakov said.

In 2017, the electronic declaration of Olexandr Tretyakov for 2015/2016, one of the first among the people's deputies was fully tested in the National Agency for the Prevention of Corruption. During the check no violations were revealed.

Olexandr Tretyakov publishes reports on his work in the parliament on the regular basis.

In January 2018, the public network Opora included Alexander Tretyakov in the top three most effective Committee Heads of the Verkhovna Rada. Tretyakov has the highest indicator of legislative efficiency: 22 adopted bills out of 62 initiated.

== Political views ==
A supporter of Ukraine's European integration, he called a mistake the rejection of the Euro-Atlantic integration (at the 2008 Summit in Bucharest, Ukraine was not added to the NATO Membership Action Plan, and in 2010, after Viktor Yanukovych came to power, the Verkhovna Rada voted to exclude Ukraine's integration into the Euro-Atlantic security space from the national priority interests). He is confident that Ukraine's accession to NATO will ensure the country's security, its independence and sovereignty. He opposed the participation of Viktor Yushchenko in the 2010 presidential election. According to Tretyakov, Yushchenko's main mission in 2010 was to hold fair elections, but the democratic camp was supposed to be represented by a single high-rated candidate, and it was Yulia Tymoshenko at that period of time. Harshly criticizing any manifestations of separatism he stands for a single conciliar Ukraine. He is a supporter of power decentralization, provision of local councils with broad powers and limiting the amount of revenues from the regional budgets to the central treasury.

== Personal life ==
Mother: Liudmyla Ivanivna Tretyakova (born 1946).

Wife: Alla Feodosivna Tretyakova (born 1969), married since 1991.

Children: daughter Daria (born 2003) and two sons, Egor and Daniil (born 2008).

== Awards and titles ==
- 1st Class Civil Servant (May 2005)
- Cross of Officer of the Order for Merits to Lithuania (June 2004)

== Notes ==
- Александр Третьяков: Зинченко только очень красиво говорил. Просто как соловей! Но что касается работы…
- Александр Третьяков: …Меня обвинили в коррупции не просто так! Это была целенаправленная акция по дискредитации команды Ющенко
- Александр ТРЕТЬЯКОВ: «Я призываю Партию регионов достойно принять поражение и прийти в парламент»
- Александр Третьяков «Сегодня для меня Ющенко – загадка больше, чем в 2004 году»
- Александр Третьяков: «Фракция «НУ–НС» будет поддерживать Тимошенко только в обмен на подпись под соглашением о совместных действиях после выборов»
