= Debarment =

Legal state of being excluded from certain rights or privileges

Debarment is the state of being excluded from enjoying certain possessions, rights, privileges, or practices and the act of prevention by legal means. For example, companies can be debarred from contracts due to allegations of fraud, mismanagement, and similar improprieties. Firms, individuals, and non-governmental organizations can be debarred.

In cross-debarment, organizations and agencies agree to mutually exclude others based on debarment by affiliates.

== Generic Drug Enforcement Act ==
The Generic Drug Enforcement Act of 1992 authorized the United States Food and Drug Administration to debar individuals and companies convicted of felonies that corrupt drug regulation from being involved in the development and approval of generic drugs. As of April 2009, the FDA has debarred 73 persons, an average of less than five per year, of which all but 9 were permanently debarred. The FDA debarred a corporate entity for the first time on March 1, 2018.

=== Constitutional issues ===
In the earliest debarment cases, following the passage of the laws permitting the imposition of this penalty, the penalty was imposed on persons who had committed the offending acts had done so before the passage of those laws. They therefore argued that the application of this penalty to them was an unconstitutional ex post facto application of the law. Another constitutional issue raised was double jeopardy, it being argued that persons who had been tried, convicted, and sentenced to a particular punishment by a court of law could not be further penalized for the same offense. The courts rejected these arguments based on the finding that debarment was not intended as a punishment but rather as a means of protecting the public from persons who had exhibited the capacity for engaging in such conduct.

== See also ==
- Blacklisting
