= Job by distribution =

Job by distribution (Russian: работа по распределению, rabota po raspredeleniyu) was a Soviet practice of obligatory job placement for college graduates. After graduation, a person would be "distributed" by a committee to a particular position anywhere within the Soviet Union, and had an obligation to work there, typically for four years.

During that time, an employee had the special status of a "young specialist": they could not be fired, and could get special benefits like housing. After the placement term expiration, the employee could continue to work there or leave for another job.

Job by distribution is still practiced in Belarus.
