= People's Will Army =

People's Will Army Армия воли народа
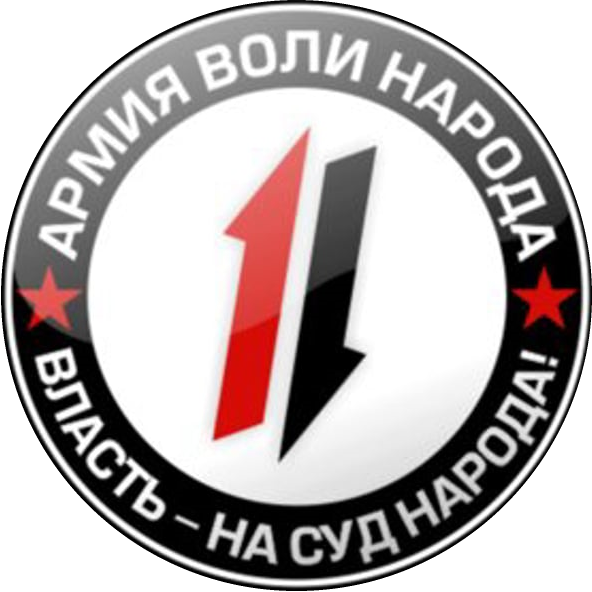
- Abbreviation: AVN (English); АВН (Russian)
- Leader: Yury Mukhin
- Founders: Yury Mukhin; Oleg Shenin
- Founded: 11 October 1997; 29 years ago
- Banned: 22 February 2011; 15 years ago
- Succeeded by: For Responsible Government
- Headquarters: Moscow
- Newspaper: Duel; K baryeru! (To the barrier!); Berozovaya kasha (Birch porridge)
- Membership (2008): 1,000
- Ideology: Delocracy; Russian nationalism National democracy Left-wing nationalism Anti-Bureaucracy; Neo-Stalinism; Antisemitism
- Political position: Syncretic
- National affiliation: National Assembly of the Russian Federation; ROT FRONT; Russian National Front
- Colours: Black; White; Red
- Slogan: "There is no responsibility without a predetermined punishment!" (Russian: "Не бывает ответственности без заранее предусмотренного наказания!")

Party flag
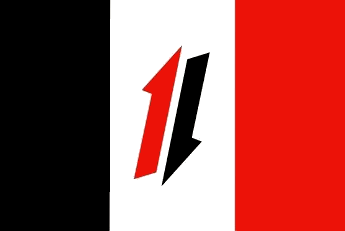

Website
- avn.armiavn.com

The People's Will Army (AVN; Russian: Армия воли народа; АВН; Armiya voli naroda, AVN) was a Russian public organization that advocated the adoption of legislative acts establishing the direct responsibility of the President and the Federal Assembly of Russia for their activities.

According to the position of the participants in this movement, the voters of Russia do not have real levers of control over politicians, which must be corrected by amending the constitution and adopting a law on the responsibility of the authorities to the people to ensure the amendment. The founder, theorist and leader of the AVN was the publicist Yury Mukhin. One of the leaders of the AVN was a former member of the Politburo of the CPSU Oleg Shenin.

AVN representatives were delegates to the National Assembly of the Russian Federation.

Print organ — the newspaper "Duel" (banned), since 2009 - "To the barrier!" (banned), since 2010 - "In their own names".

On October 19, 2010, the Moscow City Court recognized the activities of the People's Will Army as extremist and prohibited its further activities on the territory of Russia. After the AVN was recognized as an extremist organization, some of its members ceased their activities, and some moved to the Initiative Group for Conducting a Referendum “For Responsible Power”, previously created by the Interregional Public Movement “For Responsible Power”.

== Ideology ==
The theoretical AVN platform was developed by Yuri Mukhin in the 1990s.

=== Purpose of AVN ===
The main goal of the AVN was to organize a referendum for the adoption of an amendment to the Constitution of the Russian Federation (Article 138) and the Law "On the Trial of the People of Russia over the President and Members of the Federal Assembly of the Russian Federation."

According to the proposed law, each of the voters during the next presidential and Duma elections will have to, in addition to the elections themselves, assess the quality of their life during the reign of the previous president and parliament according to the simplest criterion: the life of the given voter has improved or worsened. Depending on the popular verdict, the President and the Federal Assembly either receive the highest awards of the Russian Federation for the successful administration of the country, or are imprisoned for a period equal to their tenure in power. A “no consequences” option is also possible, when the president and / or parliament receive neither awards nor penalties.

It is also envisaged to introduce a norm according to which officials who are not approved by the people could be punished up to the death penalty.

AVN proposed to introduce direct responsibility of Russian politicians for ineffective government of the country. Illustrative examples were the responsibility of a bus driver whose passengers were injured, or prison sentences that were served by the leaders of the Chernobyl nuclear power plant after the accident at the power plant.

AVN considered it necessary to introduce Article 138 into the Constitution of the Russian Federation. In accordance with its text, the Federal Assembly and the President of the Russian Federation are elected with the aim of «organizing the population (living capable citizens) by laws and decrees to protect the people (population and future generations) from the spiritual and material deterioration of life». According to the position of the AVN, «the poor organization of the protection of the people of the Russian Federation by the Federal Assembly and the President is a crime against the people that has no statute of limitations». At the same time, «in considering this crime, every citizen of the Russian Federation is a member of the people's court over the Federal Assembly and the president».

To achieve this goal, it was planned to attract from 20 to 50 thousand people to the ranks of the AVN and collect 2 million votes, sufficient to hold a national referendum. At the referendum, according to the plan of AVN, the population should adopt an amendment to the Constitution of the Russian Federation and a new federal law.

=== Draft law "On the responsibility of the authorities to the people" ===
Russian opposition politician and publicist Yuri Mukhin, based on the "theory of delocratic governance", the idea of the responsibility of power was first proposed in 1993, and a few years later it was formulated in the form of a draft amendment to the Constitution and the Law "On the Trial of the People over the President and Deputies of the Federal Assembly of the Russian Federation." Subsequently, it underwent wide public discussion by lawyers and public figures and has been improved for over 18 years. The implementation of this law provides for the introduction of a mechanism for the court (assessment) of the people over the highest elected authorities - the president and the deputies. According to the draft, during each regular election, each voter will receive an additional ballot with options for the verdict to the president or the State Duma who have completed their term. The draft verdict contains three options for assessing the results of the work of the replaced authority: "Worthy of encouragement", "Without consequences" and "Deserves punishment".

According to the results of the vote held on October 22–24, 2008 within the framework of the National Assembly, the majority of the non-systemic opposition supported this bill (for - 182, against - 63, abstained - 35).

Famous patriotic and opposition figures also expressed support for the project: Oleg Shenin; Alfrēds Rubiks; Maxim Kalashnikov; Joseph Stalin's great-grandson Yakov Dzhugashvili; Sergey Kara-Murza; Andrei Parshev; Boris Mironov; presenters of the Internet program "Actually" Alexander Krasnov and Valery Smirnov; former State Duma deputy Andrey Savelyev and others.

== Organizational structure ==
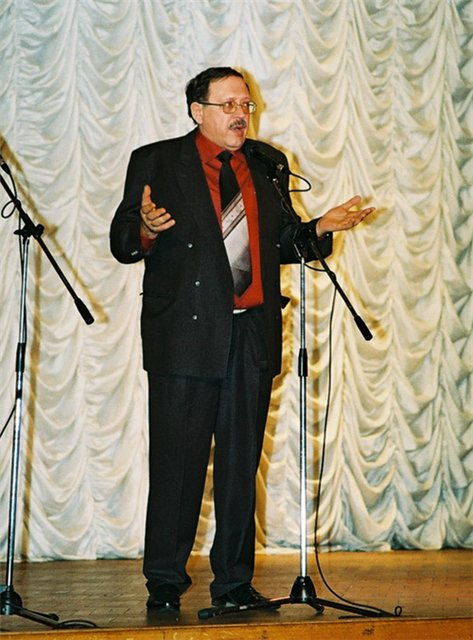
Yuri Mukhin — Leader of AVN, 2009

The Army of the People's Will was a militarized organization in name only, its methods of work were peaceful propaganda and agitation within the framework of the current legislation. However, according to the participants, the names "Army" (for the movement) and "fighters" (for the participants in the movement) served as an important disciplining factor, and also emphasized the difference between AVN and traditional parties. The AVN could include members of any other organization adhering to any ideology: the criterion for participation was only the recognition of the AVN's goal and assistance in achieving it. The politician who supported the proposed AVN law was Oleg Shenin, a former member of the Politburo of the CPSU, who headed one of the political organizations in Russia called the CPSU.

AVN was not registered with the Russian justice authorities, therefore it did not enjoy the rights of a legal entity. Certain members of the movement (soldiers of the Army) considered it useful to personally participate in the elections in order to promote the draft AVN Law both during the elections and, if successful, directly in the authorities. Since 2010, the movement has participated in the work of the new political party "Russian United Labour Front".

Among the allies of the organization was the public movement Para Bellum, one of the organizers of which is Vladimir Kvachkov.

=== Leadership ===
The acting leader of the AVN was Yury Ignatievich Mukhin.

== Activities ==
Members of the organization took part in rallies and pickets, where they distributed leaflets and newspapers, spoke at various meetings, announced their ideas on Internet resources, conducted public opinion polls in order to clarify the attitude of citizens to the bill.

In addition to Moscow, the movement had branches in the following cities: Volgograd, Vologda, Vladivostok, Yekaterinburg, Kazan, Kostroma, Krasnoyarsk, Kursk, Kurgan, Nizhny Novgorod, Novokuznetsk, Norilsk, Omsk, Orsk, Perm, Ryazan, Samara, St. Petersburg, Saratov, Tula, Tyumen, Ufa, Khabarovsk, Chelyabinsk, Chita, Yaroslavl.

The first public action organized by the AVN itself was a picket outside the building of the polish embassy in Moscow on November 4, 2005, demanding that the allegations that the execution of several thousand Polish officers in 1940 in Katyn were carried out by the forces of the NKVD USSR be falsified. State Duma deputy from the Rodina faction Andrey Savelyev spoke to the picket participants. Several Russian TV channels were filming at the event, but none of them showed a story about the action.

Later AVN held a number of other public events, and also participated in various political actions, including - according to press reports - in St. Petersburg, Tatarstan. Participated in the 2010 protest action "Day of Wrath".

On July 30, 2007, in Moscow, AVN activists, together with other political associations, held a sanctioned picket near the building of the Government of the Russian Federation in protest against the raider seizures of enterprises of the military-industrial complex. In February 2009, AVN activists took part in an all-Russian action of workers in the automotive industry. About 20 activists of the Army of the People's Will were detained before the start of the May Day procession at the Oktyabrsky Big Concert Hall in St. Petersburg in 2009. Representatives of the Army of the People's Will were holding a portrait of Vladimir Vysotsky in the role of Gleb Zheglov and a slogan with the inscription: "A thief should be in prison, not in the Kremlin."On October 9, 2010, AVN activists took part in the “March for the Preservation of St. Petersburg” in St. Petersburg, as well as in the rallies of the “Russian March” and May Day, pickets against the reform of the social sphere.

== AVN Media ==
The Moscow Prosecutor's Office emphasized the active propaganda work of AVN in the media, within which, according to representatives of the Moscow Prosecutor's Office, extremist ideas are being promoted.

=== Video ===
By order of AVN, documentaries and publicistic films and video clips were shot, which were distributed on the Internet in blogs, social networks, as well as through the specialized online store “Delokrat. Ru".

=== Печать ===
The Duel newspaper, published by Yuri Mukhin, was not called the official press organ of the AVN, but it was in fact. After the “Duel” was banned, the AVN members began to publish the newspaper “Towards the Barrier!”. AVN had a regional organ - "Birch Porridge"..

=== Internet ===
AVN had its own official website. Also, the official and unofficial sites of the AVN leader, Yury Mukhin, work.

== Opinions about AVN ==
Representatives of the Russian public and the press spoke ambiguously about the activities of the movement.

The Russian media attributed the movement to the radical left, stalinist, and socialist associations.

According to the version reported by the Deputy Prosecutor General of Russia Viktor Grin, the General Prosecutor's Office attributed the "People's Will Army" to the most active extremist associations in Russia along with the organizations: "National Socialist Society", "Movement Against Illegal Immigration", "Slavic Union", "Northern Brotherhood". To this, the leader of the Army of Will of the People replied with a statement to the Investigative Committee under the Prosecutor's Office of the Russian Federation about the slanderous nature of such a message from Grin, since the court did not recognize the activities of the AVN as extremist and in relation to the AVN the court did not decide to prohibit the activities or liquidate.

It is noteworthy that members of one of the communist movements in Russia, the RCP-CPSU, refused to participate in the work of the new Russian party "ROT Front", and the reason for the exit of this organization from the new party was the participation of the AVN in it. First Secretary of the Central Committee of the RCP-CPSU A. Prigarin said: "We believe that the leaders of the RKRP-RPK, who invited Yury Mukhin and his organization 'Army of the People's Will' to participate in the ROT Front, as well as part of the leadership of the Left Front, who gave their consent to this have made a serious political mistake. This fact puts an indelible red-brown stain on the whole new batch.".

== AVN Prosecution ==
The leaflet "You have chosen - you are the judge!", Which contained the text of the bill, was included in the Federal List of Extremist Materials by the decision of the Adler District Court of Sochi on February 26, 2008 (this decision was confirmed by the cassation ruling of the Judicial Collegium for Civil Cases of the Krasnodar Regional Court dated April 22, 2008 of the year). The material entitled “You have chosen - you are the judge”, containing the text of the proposed draft law, and published, in particular, in the newspaper “Duel” in No. 8 (475) of February 21, 2006, was again included in the Federal List of Extremist Materials by the decision of the Zamoskvoretsky District Court of the city of Moscow on March 20, 2009 (thus, this text became the only one of the materials recognized by the court as extremist twice). According to the SOVA Information and Analytical Center, recognizing the leaflet as extremist is illegal.

On October 19, 2010, at the suit of Moscow Prosecutor Yuri Semin, the Moscow City Court (judge Mikhail Kazakov) ecognized the activities of the People's Will Army as extremist and banned its activities on the territory of Russia. Earlier, by the decision of the Moscow Prosecutor, the activities of AVN were suspended.

The prosecutor's office referred to Art. 9 of the Federal Law "On Counteracting Extremist Activities", according to which the activities of organizations whose goals or actions are aimed at carrying out extremist activities are prohibited in the Russian Federation. According to the prosecutor's office, AVN called for a "violent change" of the constitutional order of the Russian Federation. The court refused to satisfy the motion of the leader of the movement Yuri Mukhin to terminate the proceedings in this case.

The meeting of the Moscow City Court on Tuesday October 19, 2010 was held in the presence of several dozen participants (fighters) of the AVN, who filed petitions to involve them in the case as third parties. The court rejected these requests. AVN leader Yuri Mukhin insisted that the movement is of an all-Russian nature and has 56 branches in Russia and abroad, and therefore the case should be considered in the Supreme Court of the Russian Federation. The court was presented with notarized statements from branches from 46 regions of Russia. However, Judge Kazakov rejected the motion to change the jurisdiction of the case.

Moscow Prosecutor Semin said that calls to vote after the expiration of the president's term of office, and if the majority of the population turned out to be dissatisfied with his actions, it was proposed to send the former head of state to prison for the period during which he ruled, are a call for a violent overthrow authorities and extremism.

According to the press service of the Prosecutor General's Office of Russia, the basis for the prosecutor's appeal to the court was the materials of the verification of the legality of the movement's activities. The report of the prosecutor's office says: "During the inspection, evidence was collected that the goals and actions of this association are aimed at carrying out extremist activities that pose a threat of harm to individuals, health of citizens, security, society and the state.".

AVN leader Yuri Mukhin said at a court hearing that the persecution of his organization is "revenge for the fact that we exposed the groups that run the country.".

On February 22, 2011, the Judicial Collegium of the Supreme Court of the Russian Federation upheld the decision of the Moscow City Court of October 19, 2010 to ban the organization.

The idea of increasing the responsibility of officials occurred not only to the supporters of the AVN. Even before the start of the persecution of the AVN, the IHPR ZOV was organized, which set itself a similar task; but its organizers could not find broad support. After the AVN was banned, the fighters and leaders had a desire to increase the responsibility of officials, and a significant part of them, after the dissolution of the AVN, joined the IGPR ZOV.

=== Public response to the ban ===
According to analysts from the SOVA Information and Analytical Center, there is no extremism in the idea of a referendum on any issue, so the legality of the Moscow City Court's decision seems questionable. According to the center, other activities of AVN do not pose a serious public danger.

== Notable AVN members ==
- Oleg Shenin — former member of the Politburo of the CPSU
- Yakov Dzhugashvili — Georgian artist, great-grandson of the Chairman of the Council of Ministers of the USSR Joseph Stalin
- Nikolay Pchelkin — front-line soldier, documentary filmmaker, one of the creators of the Songs of Resistance song contest
- Roman Zamuraev — candidate for deputies of the Duma of the city of Kostroma from the Communist Party
- Kirill Barabash — Russian poet, Air Force lieutenant colonel
- Vyacheslav Legonkov — Deputy of the National Assembly of the Russian Federation
- Andrey Ermolenko — Deputy, member of the Council of the National Assembly of the Russian Federation, liaison of the People's Will Army
- Vadim Bochkov — neurologist (Kursk)
- Vladislava Selina — Russian historian-publicist, build editor of the Panorama magazine (Volgograd), editor of the radio station Novaya Volna

== Initiative Group for the Referendum "For Responsible Government" ==
For Responsible Government За ответственную власть
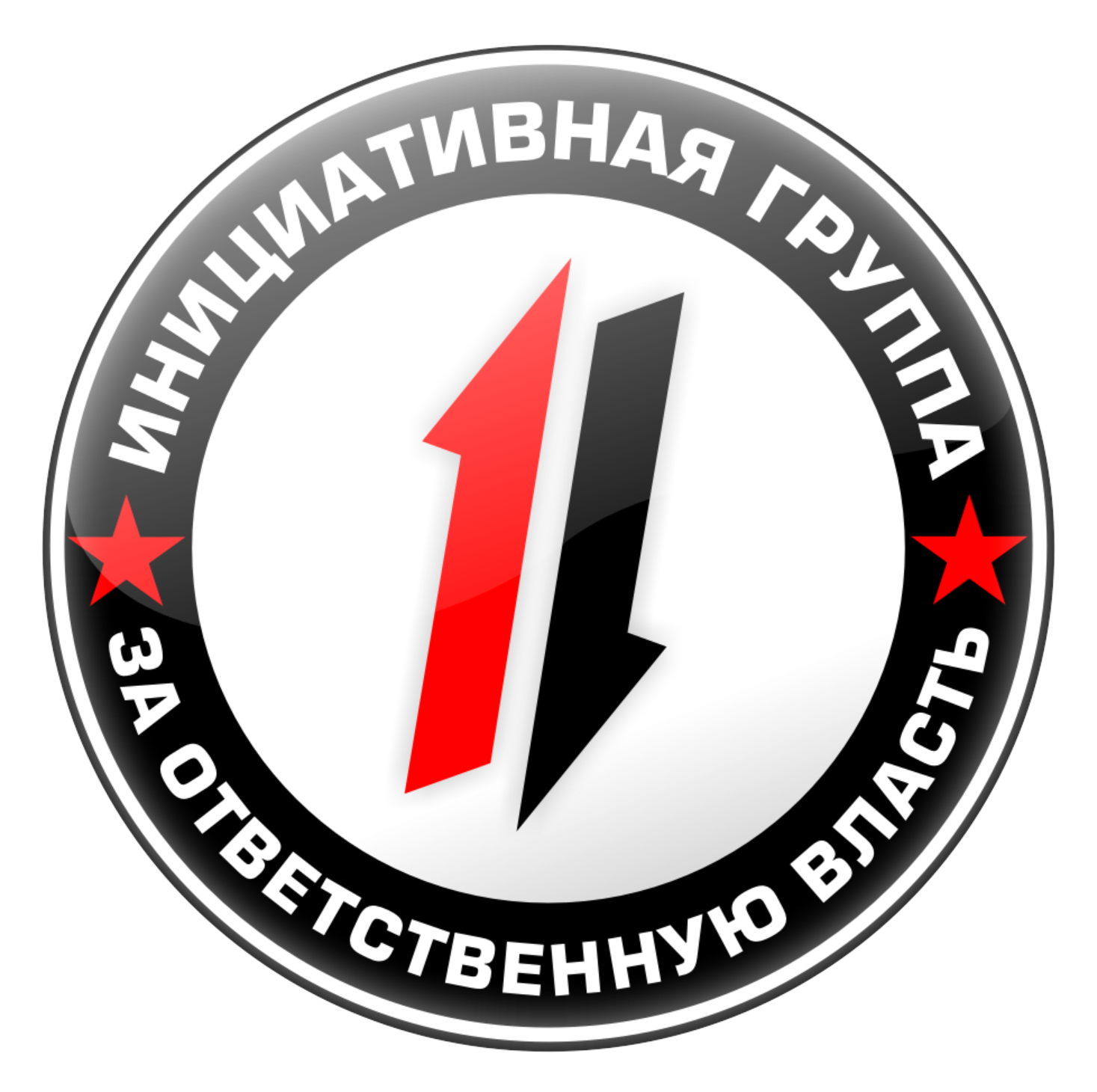
- Abbreviation: IGPR ZOV (English); ИГПР ЗОВ (Russian)
- Leader: Yury Mukhin
- Founded: 10 April 2011; 15 years ago
- Banned: 22 September 2015; 11 years ago
- Preceded by: People's Will Army
- Newspaper: Svoimi imenami (In their own names)
- Membership (2011): 572
- Ideology: Delocracy; Russian nationalism National democracy Left-wing nationalism Anti-Bureaucracy; Neo-Stalinism; Antisemitism
- Political position: Syncretic
- National affiliation: ROT FRONT
- Colours: Black; White; Red
- Slogan: "Have you chosen? Judge!" (Russian: "Избрал? Суди!")

Party flag
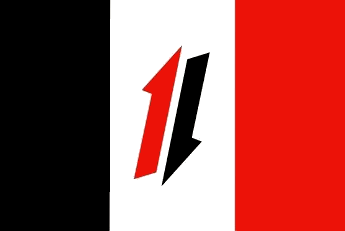

Website
- igpr.ru zaotvet.info

In parallel with the Army of Will of the People, a voluntary organization for the preparation and conduct of a referendum with the aim of adopting amendments to the Constitution and the Law "On the assessment of the president and deputies of the Federal Assembly of the Russian Federation by the people of Russia" is engaged in the initiative group for the referendum "For Responsible Government" (IGPR "ZOV").

Participants of the IGPR “For Responsible Power” actively supported the election and campaigning campaign of the Russian United Labor Front (ROT Front) party, which adopted an item on the adoption of the Law “On the Trial of the People over the President and Deputies of the RF Federal Assembly” in its program. The ROT Front party was unlawfully denied registration six times. On December 11, 2011, the IGPR "ZOV" supported the nomination of Boris Sergeevich Mironov as a presidential candidate, who adopted the draft Law "On the responsibility of the authorities" in his program. Despite the successful meeting of the initiative group numbering 572 people, the candidate was not admitted to the elections due to illegal actions of the Central Election Commission.

The participants in the initiative group called for an active boycott of the elections of deputies of the State Duma in 2011 and the elections of the President in 2012 due to the lack of mechanisms of responsibility of the elected authorities for the results of government.

The joining of the former AVN members to the IGPR ZOV did not go unnoticed: in July 2015, the court authorized the arrest of RBC employee Alexander Sokolov, former editor of the Duel newspaper Yuri Mukhin and his colleague Valery Parfyonov in the case of extremism (later - Air Force Lieutenant Colonel Kirill Barabash). The defendants were charged with organizing the activities of an extremist organization under Part 1 of Article 282.2 of the Criminal Code of the Russian Federation. According to the investigation, since 2011, Aleksandra Sokolov was the administrator of the website for the referendum, the goals and objectives of which remained the same as those of the banned Army of the People's Will (holding a referendum). On August 10, 2017, the verdict was announced. Alexander Sokolov was sentenced to three and a half years in prison, publicist Yuri Mukhin was sentenced to four years probation. Activists Valery Parfyonov and Kirill Barabash received four years in prison. Barabash was stripped of the rank of lieutenant colonel of the Armed Forces.

The course of the trial was accompanied by various conflicts. A visitor to the court session, Alexander Vedeshkin, was beaten by the bailiffs right in the courtroom, in front of the judge, prosecutors, lawyers and several dozen visitors, because he made a remark to the judge when leaving the courtroom. Later, when the lawyer Sukhanov (defended K. Barabash) tried to go to the detainee for an administrative offense, he was hit with his head on the safe

Politician Alexei Navalny spoke at the trial as a witness for the defense, and then noted that the verdict was passed by Judge Krivoruchko, a defendant in the "Magnitsky list".
