= Russian Imperial Movement =

Russian far-right political and militant organization

Russian Imperial Movement Русское имперское движениe
- Flag of the Russian Empire from 1858 to 1896
- Abbreviation: RIM
- Leader: Stanislav Vorobyov
- Founded: 2002; 24 years ago
- Headquarters: Saint Petersburg, Russia
- Paramilitary wing: Russian Imperial Legion
- Ideology: Neo-Nazism; Accelerationism; Monarchism; Russian imperialism; Russian irredentism
- Political position: Far-right
- Religion: Eastern Orthodoxy
- National affiliation: Russian National Front
- Colours

Website
- rusimperia.is (archived)

The Russian Imperial Movement (RIM) (Note: Russian: Русское имперское движениe (Russkoye Impyérskoye Dvizhénie)) is a Russian white supremacist political and militant organization. Founded in Saint Petersburg in 2002, it seeks the revival of the Russian Empire, which collapsed in 1917. The organization formed a paramilitary wing called the Imperial Legion in 2008 and has deployed troops to several conflict zones around the world, such as Ukraine, Syria, Libya, and the Central African Republic; RIM is particularly notorious for actively recruiting and training far-right Russians and like-minded Westerners to fight for Russian separatist forces in Ukraine from 2014 onward. Additionally, it has provided paramilitary training to other far-right or neo-Nazi organizations in Europe and North America.

Owing to RIM's ideology and activities in Europe and beyond, it has been designated as a terrorist organization by the United States, Canada, and the United Kingdom. Within Russia, some RIM publications are blacklisted, but the organization itself operates freely and is believed to have ties with Russian intelligence agencies. The organization's founder and current leader is Stanislav Vorobyov, who is sanctioned by the European Union and Switzerland and designated as a terrorist by the United States. The commander of RIM's Imperial Legion is currently Denis Gariyev, who is also sanctioned by the European Union and designated as a terrorist by the United States; and the most recent deputy commander was Denis Nekrasov, who was killed in the Battle of Izium during the Russian invasion of Ukraine in 2022.

== Overview ==
=== Ideology ===
RIM adheres to militarism, and is anti-Ukrainian. Its website has been found to be part of a broader cluster of websites for political groups in Russia that promote "political [Eastern] Orthodoxy" and monarchy, drawing inspiration from the violently ultra-nationalist "Black Hundreds" who supported the House of Romanov in the early 20th century. Other groups in this cluster include "For Faith and Fatherland" and the modern revival of the "Union of the Russian People", which was a far-right monarchist political party in the former Russian Empire. The movement believes in the "all-Russian nation" and does not recognize the existence of Ukraine, of which large parts have been under Russian occupation since 2014. According to the U.S. Global Engagement Center, RIM regards itself as standing at odds with a "global Zionist conspiracy" aimed at undermining Russia and restructuring the world's governments to benefit the Jewish people. Likewise, the organization denies the Holocaust, claims that Jews murder Christian children and drink their blood, and claims that the Jewish people are conspiring to bring about the coming of the anti-Christ.

=== International status and sanctions ===
On 6 April 2020, the U.S. Department of State added the Russian Imperial Movement and three of its leaders (Stanislav Anatolyevich Vorobyev, Denis Valliullovich Gariyev, and Nikolay Nikolayevich Trushchalov) to the Specially Designated Global Terrorist list, thereby making it the first white supremacist group to be designated a terrorist organization by the State Department.

The group was officially designated as a terrorist group in Canada on 3 February 2021.

On 1 July 2025, the British government announced its intentions to proscribe the Russian Imperial Movement as a terrorist organisation, alongside Palestine Action and the neo-Nazi Maniac Murder Cult. The group was proscribed as a terrorist organisation on 5 July 2025.

== Political activity ==
In Russia, RIM is politically affiliated with an alliance of orthodox nationalist groups called Russian National Front, consisting of Black Hundreds, Great Russia Party, People's Militia named after Minin and Pozharsky and Union of Orthodox Banner-Bearers. RIM's military arm is affiliated with a coalition of neo-Nazi military groups taking part in the Russian invasion of Ukraine made up of Atomwaffen Division Russland, Rusich and Russian ONA, with some overlap.

=== Ties with the Russian government ===
The International Centre for Counter-Terrorism described the RIM's relationship with the Russian government as "an adversarial symbiosis"; as long as they do not commit terrorism domestically, they are free to operate and offer training to militants and to send troops to conflicts abroad where Russia has a stake in.

Western intelligence officials say they believe that the RIM has ties with and cooperates with Russian intelligence. The New York Times, citing unnamed U.S. officials, states that RIM is only partially aligned with the Russian government; the movement's leadership has been critical of the government's conduct of the Ukraine invasion, and has accused Putin of corruption. Yet, the RIM and Russian intelligence share common goals abroad, leading to a symbiotic relationship in which Russian intelligence has been able to influence the RIM's actions.

== Militant activity ==
Russian Imperial Legion
- Русский Имперский Легион
- Patch of the Russian Imperial Legion
- Commander: Denis Gariyev
- Deputy Commander: Vacant (Note: Vacant since the death of Denis Nekrasov in 2022.)
- Founded: 2014
- Size: 300 (2014); Thousands (2015)
- Website: Imperial Legion on Telegram

In 2008, RIM formed its paramilitary arm, named the Imperial Legion (Russian: Имперский легион, romanized: Impersky legion), which has been led by Denis Valliullovich Gariyev since at least 2014, and has called for "young Orthodox men" to dedicate themselves to defending Novorossiya.

=== Imperial Legion training and deployments ===
The group maintains two training facilities in Saint Petersburg, one of which is known as camp Partizan, located south of Heinäsenmaa island. Partizan runs training in urban warfare, shooting, tactical medicine, high-altitude activity, military psychology, and survival.

After the war in Donbas broke out in eastern Ukraine in April 2014, the RIM began training and sending volunteer soldiers to the pro-Russian groups in the conflict in July.

Some members of the Imperial Legion have worked as mercenaries in the Middle East and North Africa. On January 30, 2020, it was reported that Vladimir Skopinov, who had also previously fought in Donbas and Syria, had died in Libya—the second member of the Legion to die there.

==== War crimes and human rights violations ====
Some people affiliated with the movement have been implicated in crimes. Klaud Rommel who was affiliated with Russian Orthodox fundamentalist militias has been charged with "sexual violence committed against a victim under the age of 12" for allegedly "systematically" raping a 10-year-old girl. Rommel was arrested after returning from the frontline in Ukraine and having recovered from wounds sustained there. Rommel was also known for producing media from a Russian Orthodox militant perspective and writing about the New World Order.

=== International alliances and recruitment ===
According to the US State Department, RIM provides "paramilitary-style training" to extremists throughout Europe and operates two training facilities there.

==== Estonia ====
There exists a RIM-affiliated fighting club in Estonia. Estonia expelled two ethnic Russian members as a threat to national security. According to Estonian Internal Security Service report in connection to RIM, "Russian citizens have attempted to infiltrate far-right organisations in Estonia".

==== Finland ====
RIM has provided paramilitary training to Finnish neo-Nazis. Finnish neo-Nazis have been recruited for the war in Ukraine by local far-right pro-Russian parties. In July 2023 the Finnish police arrested five men in Lahti who possessed assault rifles and adhered to accelerationism and Siege and planned to ignite a race war by attacking the infrastructure, electric grid and railroads. The men discussed forming a new Atomwaffen cell, and discussed assassinating Prime minister Sanna Marin. It was reported the men had at least planned training in Russia, and had met with Janus Putkonen. Later multiple sources confirmed the men had acquired training for the use of firearms and explosives. Additionally the group committed burglaries against left-wing targets. RIM initially trained members of its ally Nordic Resistance Movement in Finland, and since its banning it has continued training NRM's successor groups including Finnish Atomwaffen.

==== Germany ====
RIM has provided paramilitary training to German neo-Nazis.

In May 2018, German Junge Nationaldemokraten held a gathering in Riesa, Germany, where representatives of RIM took part in together with related organizations such as the neo-Nazi Serbian Action and Bulgarian National Union.

On 5 June 2020, the German magazine Focus reported that the German security services were aware of the training of German neo-Nazis in Russia. However, they could not prohibit the Germans from traveling to Saint Petersburg for legal reasons. The authorities assume that Russian president Vladimir Putin is aware of the camps and "at least tolerates them".

In 2022, the German government verified that members of the German NPD youth organization Young Nationalists and the German neo-Nazi group "Third Way" trained in Russia in this center.

==== Poland ====
RIM has also provided paramilitary training to Polish neo-Nazis.

==== Spain ====
In November 2019, a representative of RIM held a speech at an international conference in Madrid that was organized by the neo-Nazi far-right Spanish political party "National Democracy" which was attended by members of Alliance for Peace and Freedom.

On 29 April 2020, the Spanish Ministry of the Interior received an intelligence report which stated that RIM was inciting its right-wing extremist contacts in Spain to commit acts of terror, such as attacking the infrastructure, transportation system and using chemical weapons against the public.

The RIM—possibly acting as a proxy for Russian intelligence—is believed to have perpetrated the letter bomb terrorist campaign that targeted Spanish governmental institutions, embassies, and military and defense industry installations across Spain in late 2022. Important RIM members are known to have been present in Spain, and the RIM has fostered ties with Spanish far-right groups.

==== Sweden ====
In 2008, RIM visited Sweden in order to attend Karl XII's Memorial Day in Stockholm together with the neo-Nazi Party of the Swedes. In autumn 2015 it was noted that RIM had provided support to the Swedish Resistance Movement (SMR), and that RIM's leader Vorobyev had visited SMR in Sweden.

On 26 January 2020, a Russian man named Anatoly Udodov was arrested at the Arlanda airport after the police had discovered a cache of weapons belonging to him. The Swedish police had confiscated numerous firearms from him the previous summer due to his connections to SMR. Udodov was described as the representative of RIM in Sweden by Vorobyev and investigators believe he is the local recruiter for the RIM training camps. According to Swedish police Udodov is friends with a convicted terrorist, 23-year-old Viktor Melin. Melin was part of a group of Swedish neo-Nazis who went to Russia for military training, and upon returning was responsible for a string of bombings against minorities and political enemies.

==== United States ====
According to multiple sources, Atomwaffen Division Russland receives training from the group. The citizens of the United States who are affiliated with the group are also believed to have taken part in it. Later, the National Counterterrorism Center Director Christopher Miller confirmed that American neo-Nazis have had contacts with the RIM; specifically, on previous occasions, they have traveled to Russia to train with the group, however Miller described these connections as "relatively loose and informal". The ties between Atomwaffen and RIM reach back to 2015 when Brandon Russell met with the leadership of RIM. Additionally both groups adhere to James Mason's accelerationism. According to the Center on Terrorism, Extremism and Counterterrorism;

In the last decade, RIM has put considerable effort into connecting with other white supremacist, accelerationist, or ultra-Orthodox organizations abroad. Experts from the Stanford Center for International Security and Cooperation even speculate that after fighting in the Donbas War, RIM sought to position itself at the forefront of the transnational white supremacist movement in an ambitious networking plan called the "Last Crusade"....The "Last Crusade" proved to be a successful promotion of RIM's training camps to American accelerationists. In 2018, the neo-Nazi Atomwaffen Division's (AWD) leader Kaleb James Cole, accompanied by another member Aiden Bruce-Umbaugh, traveled to Russia to receive training at RIM's facilities. RIM has also provided training to other US nationals affiliated with AWD in St. Petersburg sometime around 2020. At present, the above information suggests an overlap between AWD and RIM in support for antisemitic action and militant accelerationism.

== See also ==
- Antisemitism in Russia
- Atomwaffen Division
- Combat 18
- List of fascist movements by country
- Nordic Resistance Movement
- Order of Nine Angles
- Racism in Russia
- Radical right (Europe)
- Rashism
- Terrorism in Russia
