= Vladimir Pribylovsky =

Soviet Russian human rights activist (1956-2016)

Vladimir Valerianovich Pribylovsky
- Владимир Валерианович Прибыловский
- Born: 6 March 1956; Moscow, Soviet Union
- Died: 13 January 2016 (aged 59); Moscow, Russia
- Education: Moscow State University
- Occupations: journalism, political analysis, activism
- Known for: human rights activism

Vladimir Valerianovich Pribylovsky (Russian: Влади́мир Валериа́нович Прибыло́вский, 6 March 1956 – 13 January 2016) was a Soviet and Russian political scientist, historian, journalist, human rights activist, and author of internet database Anticompromat.org on biographies of Russian politicians. He also authored more than 40 books.

== Biography ==
Pribylovsky graduated from the Department of Medieval History of Moscow State University in 1981 specializing in Byzantine studies, and published several articles on early Byzantine history. In the 1980s he was persecuted by Soviet authorities for spreading banned literature.

Since 1993 he was the president of the Panorama Information and Research Center think tank. From November 2005 he operated the Russian-language website Anticompromat.org, which is essentially a collection of biographies of Russian politicians compiled and partially written by Pribylovsky from a variety of published sources. The site was included in the Federal List of Extremist Materials. On 31 March, after being shortly closed, the website moved to a Californian hosting.

Together with Yury Felshtinsky, Pribylovsky co-authored The Operation Successor, a book about Vladimir Putin's rise to power. Later versions were published as The Age of Assassins and Corporation. According to reviews, the book describes KGB's system of corporate rule in Russia.

His latest project was providing Russian language documents about corruption in Russia for international project "Kleptocracy Initiative", including documents on registration of cooperative Ozero.

On 13 January 2016, Pribylovsky was found dead in his Moscow apartment. His last book was "Around Putin". It was published after his death. The body of Pribylovsky, according to his will, was cremated. He was buried at the Khovansky cemetery in Moscow.

== Books ==
- Guide to New Russian Political Parties and Organizations; Dec 1992 ISBN 5-85895-012-4;
- National-patriots, Church and Putin. Parliamentary and Presidential Campaigns 1999–2000. By E.Mikhailovskya, V.Pribylovsky, A.Verkhovsky. 2001. ISBN 5-94420-001-4
- Pribylovsky, Vladimir; Felshtinsky, Yuri. The Operation Successor. A political portrait of Vladimir Putin (Text online) (in Russian)., 2004
- Felshtinsky, Yuri; Pribylovsky, Vladimir (2008). The Age of Assassins. The Rise and Rise of Vladimir Putin. London: Gibson Square Books. ISBN 978-1-906142-07-0.
- Yuri Felshtinsky, Vladimir Pribylovsky, The Corporation. Russia and the KGB in the Age of President Putin, ISBN 1-59403-246-7, Encounter Books; February 25, 2009, description.
- Vladimir Pribylovsky The Purge by Vladimir Putin. Who has been eliminated, and who remains? (Russian), 2013, ISBN 978-5-4438-0333-3, Google books and review.
- Around Putin. A biographical directory (Russian), Panorama, 2016, ISBN 5944200537. Online version of the book.
- Animal Farm 2, an unofficial sequel to Animal Farm. Online version on Orwell's Site
