= Yury Mukhin =

Yury Mukhin is the name of:

- Yury Mukhin (author) (born 1949), Russian conspiracy theorist
- Yury Mukhin (swimmer) (born 1971), Russian freestyle swimmer
