= Denis Nekrasov =

Denis Nekrasov may refer to:

- Denis Nekrasov (cyclist)
- Denis Nekrasov (Russian nationalist)
