= Stanislav Vorobyov =

Russian ultra-nationalist leader

Stanislav Anatolyevich Vorobyov (born June 2, 1960) is a Russian ultra-nationalist, Neo-Nazi and the leader of the Russian Imperial Movement.

In the context of the Russo-Ukrainian War, he is sanctioned by the European Union and Switzerland and is designated by the United States Department of State as a Specially Designated International Terrorist.

== Biography ==
Vorobiev was born on June 2, 1960, in the former USSR. In 1982 he graduated from Leningrad State University. AA Jdanova. He founded the Russian Imperial Movement in 2002 in Saint Petersburg, a far-right Russian organization advocating monarchism, expansionist nationalism and summoning the Zemsky Sobor to restore the Russian Empire.

He reportedly said:

Our nationalism is religious in nature. Of course, the Russian people are God's chosen people and as such are obligated to fulfill their mission - to bring truth to mankind. In order to fulfill its mission, the Russian people must be united and clothed in the armor of a strong national state. "The divided kingdom will not stand". And the weak will not fulfill the mission entrusted to him. The purpose of everyone's life, whether he realizes it or not, is the salvation of his own soul. And if wives are saved through procreation, then how can husbands be saved? Only in social service, in the struggle against evil "In a struggle accessible to all. This is the struggle for the rights and interests of Russia.

On April 6, 2020, he was classified as a Specially Designated Terrorist by the United States Department of State by the first Trump administration at the same time that his organization was designated as a terrorist movement.

As the leader of the Imperial Russian Movement, Stanislav Vorobiev is considered responsible for supporting or implementing actions or policies that undermine or threaten the territorial integrity of Ukraine, or stability or security in Ukraine, or which hinder the work of international organizations in Ukraine.

According to the website War&Sanctions:

Under the leadership of Stanislav Vorobyev, the Russian Imperial Movement promotes ethnic Russian nationalism, seeking to fuel white supremacist extremism in the countries. It provides paramilitary training to Russian citizens and members of like-minded organizations from other countries.

== See also ==
- Denis Nekrasov
