= Black-yellow-white flag of the Russian Empire =

Flag of the Russian Empire (1858–1896)

Black-yellow-white flag
- Use: State and war flag
- Proportion: 1∶2
- Adopted: 11 June 1858; 168 years ago
- Relinquished: 29 April 1896; 130 years ago (de facto)
- Design: A horizontal tricolour of black, yellow, and white
- Proportion: 3∶5
- Proportion: 2∶3

The black-yellow-white flag (Russian: чёрно-желто-белый флаг, romanised: cherno-zhelto-belyy flag) was an official flag of the Russian Empire from 11 June 1858, until it was abolished on 29 April 1896 by order of Nicholas II, although it was never officially rescinded in law. It was formally used as the state and war flag of Russia, only for use by government agencies and state buildings, with the traditional white-blue-red flag remaining in use for private purposes. The colours are in reference to Peter the Great, who used the colours on his ship's standard with a black two-headed eagle.

Since its abolishment, the flag has been used by various monarchist movements in Russia seeking for the re-establishment of the tsar, including during the Soviet Union and Russian Federation, as well as in various protests against the government. It has also been controversially adopted by several nationalist and far-right movements in Russia.

== History ==
The combination of black, yellow, and white colours was first noted at the beginning of the 18th century under Peter the Great on his ship's standard (this flag indicated the personal presence of the sovereign on a warship): on the yellow cloth was placed a black two-headed eagle with white maps of the four seas in its beaks and claws. Officially, the coat of arms of the Russian Empire were designated under Empress Catherine I in the decree of the Senate of 11 March 1726 on the manufacture of a new state seal, the Russian coat of arms was described as "a black eagle with outstretched wings in a yellow field". In the late 1850s Bernhard Karl von Koehne, who became the head of the Heraldry Department of the Governing Senate in June 1857, carried out a large-scale reform of Russian heraldry and the proposal for revising the state colours of the Russian Empire was also raised. On 11 June 1858, at the initiative of Koehne, by decree of Emperor Alexander II, a new flag with the "emblem colours" was approved. The scope of application of the new flag was limited: it was intended primarily for decorating buildings, streets and squares on solemnities. White-blue-red tricolours continued to fly on commercial and other civil ships, while embassies and consulates of the Russian Empire had their own flags with a special pattern.

In the same year, the printing house of the Third Section of His Imperial Majesty's Own Chancellery published the work of General Alexander Petrowitsch Jasykow On Russian State Colour, which justifies the idea that the national colours of Russia should correspond to the colours of the state coat of arms, which Jasykow states is black, gold and white. Initially approved by the emperor, the black-yellow-white flag was called the "coat of arms of the people's flag". Currently, in Russian historiography, this flag is recognised as the first officially approved state flag of the Russian Empire (albeit the white-blue-red flag was the de facto national flag pre-1858). On 1 January 1865, by his nominal decree, Alexander II established the medal "For the pacifying of the Polish rebellion of 1863–1864", the colours of the ribbon of which – black, gold and white – were called "state colours". Subsequently, black-yellow-white colours were used in the creation of the coats of arms of the Bessarabian and Kutaisi provinces—these were approved in 1878 and 1870, respectively.

The black-yellow-white flag existed as an official flag for almost 25 years; however, on 28 April 1883 at the eve of the coronation of Alexander III, the edict "On flags for decorating buildings in solemnities" was issued. It allowed to use only white-blue-red flags to decorate buildings. As a result, on 29 April 1896, according to the report of the Grand Duke Alexei Alexandrovich, who headed the maritime department, Emperor Nicholas II decided to recognise "in all cases the white-blue-red flag as national". In accordance with this command, the coronation of Nicholas II, held on 14 May 1896, took place with many white-blue-red flags. Its guests were given white-blue-red ribbons, and guests of honour were awarded commemorative medals on white-blue-red ribbons. At the same time, flags and ribbons of white-yellow-black colours were also used for decoration. At the end of the 19th century, white-blue-red flags essentially replaced black-yellow-white colours from public life, which began to be perceived as purely "Romanov". The ribbon of such colours, however, arranged in reverse order, was at the medals "In memory of the campaign of Admiral Rozhestvensky's squadron to the Far East" and "In memory of the 300th anniversary of the reign of the House of Romanov", awarded in 1907 and 1913 respectively. Despite this, the white-blue-red flag became the true national flag, it accompanied fairs and other national holidays, and could already be found in army units during the Russo-Japanese War.

On 10 May 1910, a new committee approved under the Ministry of Justice was convened "for a comprehensive and, if possible, final clarification of the issue of state Russian national colours" chaired by Deputy Minister of Justice A. N. Verevkina. Representatives of various ministries (justice, public education, Imperial Court, maritime, foreign affairs, internal affairs), the Department of Heraldry of the Senate, the Hermitage and the Imperial Public Library took part in its work. No agreement would be reached and the flag remained unchanged.

=== Post-Soviet usage ===
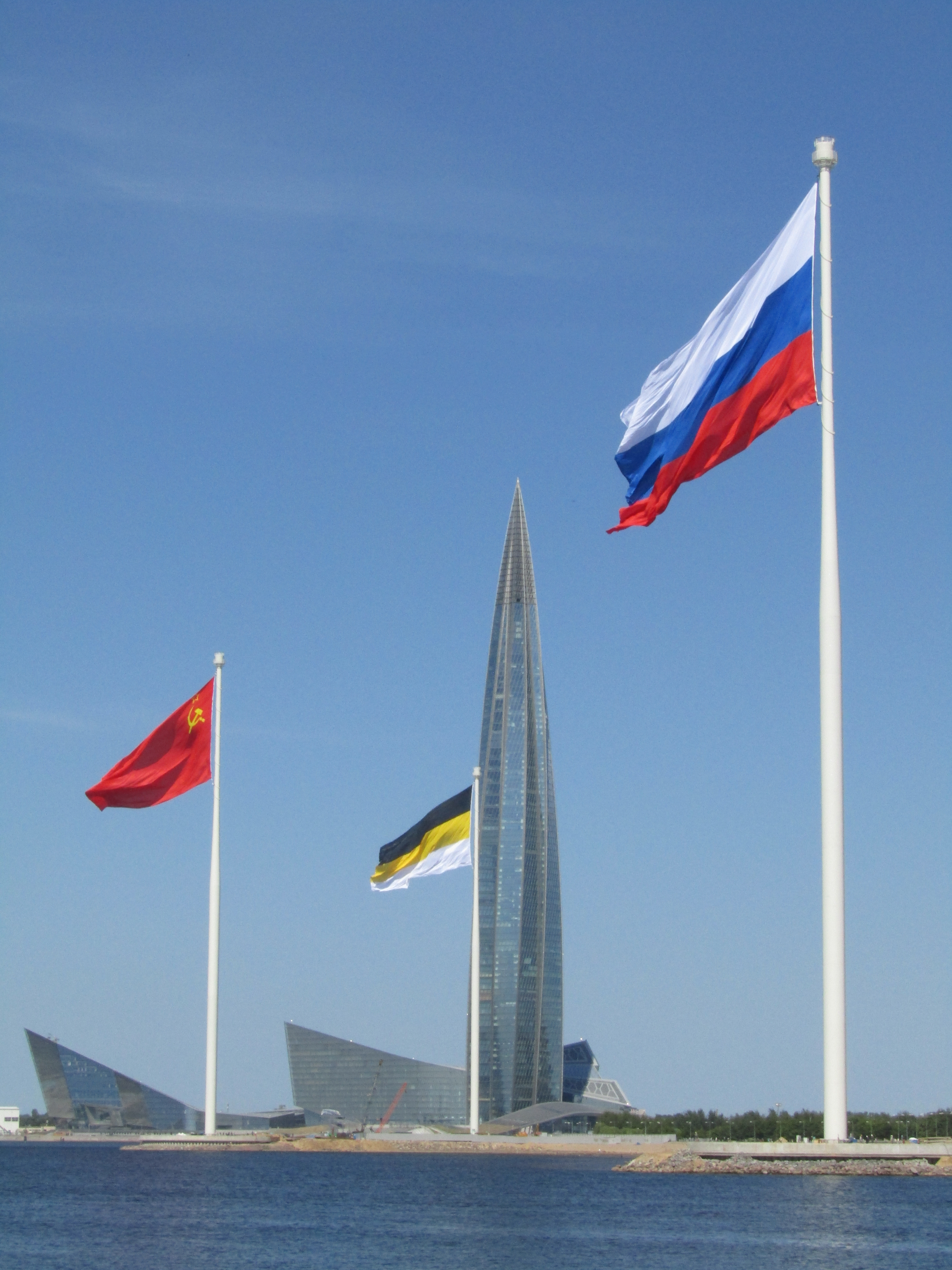
The current flag of Russia, next to the Soviet flag, and Russian Empire flag, on display in St. Petersburg in 2023.

In 1929, the head of the Russian Imperial House, Grand Duke Kirill Vladimirovich, established the Order of Saint Nicholas the Wonderworker in exile, which is worn with a black, yellow and white ribbon.

The flag featuring white-yellow-black colours (a white field with a yellow diamond and a black swastika in it) was used by the Russian anti-Soviet organisation of the 1930s and '40s – the Russian Fascist Party. According to the party's charter, the party flag of the RFP was hung together with the national white-blue-red flag.

=== Attempts at revival ===
In the late 1980s, the black-gold-white flag began to be used by a significant part of monarchists and supporters of conservative movements in Russia, contrasting it with the white-blue-red flag, which, since 1988, began to be used by the democratic movement. The requirement to establish the official status of this flag (in one form or another) also appears in the program documents of a number of public associations.

During the August Coup, the black-yellow-white flag, along with the white-blue-red flag, was used by opponents of the State Emergency Committee.

A draft for the Constitution of Russia, officially proposed by the Congress of Russian Communities in March 1993 for consideration at the Congress of People's Deputies of Russia, provided for the establishment of a black-yellow-white flag as the state flag of Russia.

During the 1993 Russian constitutional crisis, the black-yellow-white flag (along with St. Andrew's flag and the flags of the USSR and the RSFSR) was used by supporters of the Supreme Council of Russia. Subsequently, the proposal to approve the black-yellow-white flag as the state flag of the Russian Federation was made by deputies of the State Duma Vladimir Zhirinovsky and Nikolai Kuryanovich. Currently, the black-yellow-white flag is used by Russian nationalist, monarchist, Cossack and patriotic organisations, as well as football fans.

On 13 August 2014, Chairman of the Parliament of Novorossiya Oleg Tsaryov presented a new flag of Novorossiya – a white-yellow-black flag. "The republic was created on the lands that were part of the Russian Empire when tsarist Russia existed, and people went to a referendum for the right to be annexed by the Russian Federation. For this reason, the commission focused on the option which is associated with the flag of the Russian Empire," Tsaryov explained.

On 17 June 2023 in the new St. Petersburg 300th Anniversary Park, the historical flags of the Russian Empire (black-yellow-white flag), the USSR and the current Russian flag were raised on the highest flagpoles in Europe (179.5 m). The ceremony was dedicated to the 330th anniversary of the white-blue-red flag of Peter I, the 165th anniversary of the black-yellow-white flag established by Alexander II, and the 100th anniversary of the USSR flag.

The flag is currently used by the Russian Imperial Movement and Union of the Russian People, and was formerly used by the Russians organisation

An inverted flag formerly used by the Fascist Party, later proposed for the Novorossiyan movement and currently used by the Russian National Front

Flag of Kursk Oblast since 1996

Flag of the Movement Against Illegal Immigration

Flag of the modern Black Hundreds movement

Flag of the Russian All-People's Union

Service sleeve insignia of the Sparta Battalion

== See also ==
- Flag of the Habsburg monarchy, which is similar but lacks the white stripe
- Flag of the German Empire
- Prince's Flag
