= Russian National Front =

Russian National Front Русский национальный фронт
- Abbreviation: RNF; РНФ
- Leader: Andrey Savelyev
- Founded: 21 December 2014
- Ideology: Russian nationalism Factions: Neo-Stalinism; Orthodox nationalism Neo-Sovietism; National-populism; National conservatism Militarism; Antisemitism; Anti-Ukrainian sentiment Monarchism; Russian irredentism
- Political position: Big tent, Far right
- Members: Great Russia; IGPR ZOV; NOMP; SPKh; RID; SRN

Party flag

Website
- runfront.ru

The Russian National Front (Russian: Русский национальный фронт; romanized: Russkii natsional'nyi front) is a coalition of Russian nationalist organizations that support Novorossiya. The coalition started in December 2014 during the so-called "Russian Spring". The group organized the Russian march of 2016 and also took part in 2017 demonstrations in Moscow.

The members of the front are:

- Great Russia
- Initiative Group for the Referendum "For Responsible Government"
- People's Militia named after Minin and Pozharsky
- Russian Imperial Movement
- Union of the Russian People
- Union of Orthodox Banner-Bearers

The organization uses an inverted Imperial black-yellow-white flag, a design previously used by the Russian Fascist Party.
