= Pavel Grudinin 2018 presidential campaign =

Pavel Grudinin for President
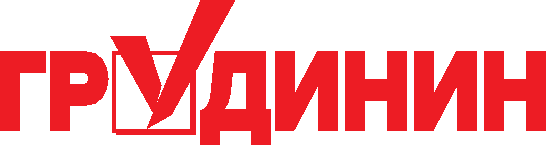
- Campaign: 2018 Russian presidential election
- Candidate: Pavel Grudinin; CEO of Sovkhoz Imeni Lenina
- Affiliation: Communist Party and National Patriotic Forces of Russia
- Status: Presumed nominee: 22 December 2017; Official nominee: 23 December 2017; Registered candidate: 12 January 2018; Lost election: 18 March 2018
- Key people: Chief of staff: Gennady Zyuganov; Press Secretary: Alexander Yushchenko
- Receipts: RUB 86,401,452.29
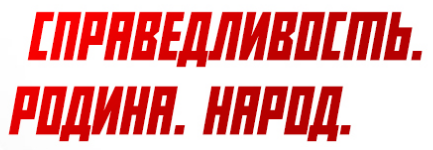
- Slogan(s): (Fairness. Motherland. People.)

Website
- grudininkprf.ru

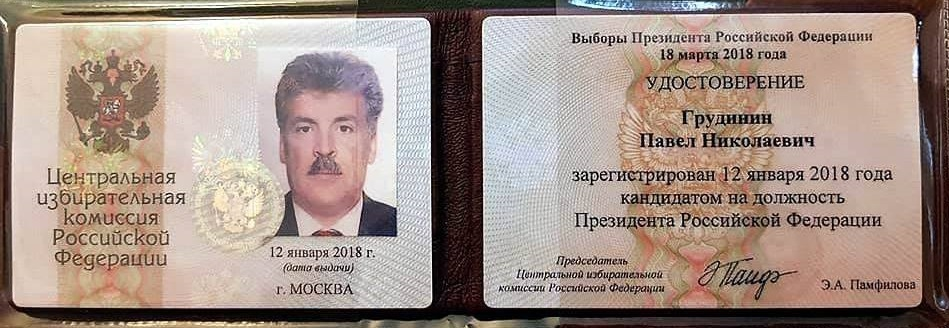
Identity card of Pavel Grudinin as presidential candidate.

The 2018 presidential campaign of Pavel Grudinin, CEO of the Lenin State Farm and former Member of the Moscow Oblast Duma, was announced at the Communist Party congress on 23 December 2017.

== Background ==
In December 2016, the First Secretary of the Communist party Gennady Zyuganov said that the Communist party has 21 potential candidates for the 2018 presidential elections. Among these candidates was Pavel Grudinin. Despite the fact that on 7 November 2017, Zyuganov said his own nomination was supported by all leftist forces and he would participate in the elections on behalf of the party, the Zhigulyovsk branch of the party voted to supported the candidacy of Pavel Grudinin, who also won the primaries of Left Front, a coalition of left-wing parties with no representation in the State Duma. Grudinin did not deny his nomination from the Communist Party in 2018. On 21 December it was reported that Zyuganov proposed to nominate Grudinin. Initially the Communist Party and the National Patriotic Forces of Russia (NPFR) planned to nominate a single candidate: Grudinin (supported by the Communists) or Yury Boldyrev (supported by the NPFR). Boldyrev also participated in the primaries of Left Front in which he lost in the second round to Grudinin. According to the Deputy Alexander Yushchenko, Gennady Zyuganov was still among the candidates for the nomination. He named the other candidates as Yury Afonin, Sergey Levchenko and Leonid Kalashnikov. On 22 December Zyuganov, Levchenko and Kalashnikov withdrew their bids, and Zyuganov rejected the candidacies of Afonin and Boldyrev, leaving Grudinin as the sole candidate.

=== Nomination ===
Pavel Grudinin was officially elected as the presidential candidate from the Communist Party of the Russian Federation at its congress on 23 December.

For		Against	
314	96.6%	11	3.4%

== Campaign ==
On 28 December 2017, after nomination by the Congress of the Communist Party, Grudinin filed documents for participation in the election to the CEC and on 29 December, the CEC has officially registered its authorized representatives and allowed to open election account.

Soon after the nomination, Pavel Grudinin was an asset to participate in a TV show on the main Federal TV channels, such as Channel One and Russia-1 where he first met with one of his rivals in the presidential race, Vladimir Zhirinovsky.

On 19 January Pavel Grudinin started his visit to regions. Just, he plans to visit 10-15 federal subjects in all Federal districts.

On 19 January Grudinin visited Saint Petersburg, where he laid flowers to the monument on the embankment of the Fontanka river, where people were taking water during the Siege of Leningrad, held a press conference and meeting with voters. He also visited the Kirov Plant, where there was examined a range of tractors manufactured, made a trip on one of the tractors, met workers and answered their questions.

On 25 January Pavel Grudinin visited Samara Oblast, where he visited two major cities Samara and Tolyatti. In Samara Grudinin, visited Samara State Institute of Culture, where he met with students and gave a press conference. Later Pavel Grudinin went to Tolyatti, where he had a meeting with voters.

On 30 January Pavel Grudinin arrived in the Ufa, Bashkortostan. On 31 January Grudinin visited Meat-processing plant "Sava", where he inspected the company and talked to the workers, gave a press conference for the Bashkir media and held a meeting with voters.

On 1 February Pavel Grudinin visited Yekaterinburg. In Yekaterinburg Grudinin met with members of the Presidium of the Ural branch of the Russian Academy of Sciences. Speaking to academics, he said that the reform of the RAS was completely wrong and that science and science education are required to spend at least 7% of the state budget. In the evening Grudinin held a meeting with voters.

On 5 February Pavel Grudinin visited Rostov-on-Don. In Rostov-on-Don Grudinin gave a press-conference for regional mass media, visited the company Rostselmash, where he talked with workers, and in the evening held a meeting with voters in the Palace of Culture of Railwaymen.

On 6 February Pavel Grudinin gave an interview to the popular Russian video blogger Yury Dud. In an interview Grudinin said he believes Joseph Stalin is the best ruler of Russia in the last hundred years. He criticized the CEO of Rosneft Igor Sechin, saying that he was ready to fire him, because the company, which he manages, is ineffective. Grudinin also said that he was ready to take Alexei Navalny to his team. At the conclusion of the interview, Grudinin and Dud made a bet where if Pavel Grudinin gains less than 15% of the vote, he will have to shave off his mustache, but if Grudinin gets more than 15% of the votes, Yury Dud will have to cut his hair bald.

On 9 February Pavel Grudinin visited Nizhny Novgorod. The timetable of his visit was outlined on his presidential Instagram account. He put flowers to the statue of Minin and Pozharsky and later went on to talk to the workers of the factory "Thermal". Later he gave a press conference and answered to voters' questions. Also, he gave a press Conference in Dzerzhinsk.

On 12 February Pavel Grudinin visited Barnaul. In Barnaul Grudinin with his colleagues laid flowers at the monument to Lenin in the Square of the Soviets and held two major events. Before lunch, he met with local journalists and held a press conference for them. After lunch, Grudinin made before the activists of the Communist party, supporters and ordinary citizens.

On 13 February Pavel Grudinin visited Novosibirsk. He was met with fireworks by supporters of the Communist part and NPFR. First he put flowers to the monument of Lenin, he proceeded to visit the local agrarian university, where he answered the questions of both the leadership and students. Next he met with the leadership of the Siberian Federal Center for agrobiotechnology, after which was a meeting with the scientific and entrepreneurs of Novosibirsk Oblast.

On 26 February Grudinin visited Krasnodar Krai. During his visit he went to the scientific institute of gardening and grapes and met with the working collective. He went on to hold a meeting with voters at the local palace of culture. He was accompanied by Yury Afonin and Yury Boldyrev. At the moment of the visit Grudinin has one of the highest support in Krasnodar.

On 28 February, Pavel Grudinin met with scientists in the Shirshov Institute of Oceanology in Moscow.

On 1 March, during a TV debate on the Channel One, Pavel Grudinin criticized the debate, calling them "Bazaar", said that he was not going to participate in them and left the Studio. Subsequently, he ceased to participate in the debate, instead, they began to participate.

On 2 and 3 March, Pavel Grudinin visited Irkutsk Oblast. On 2 March, Grudinin held a meeting with voters in Angarsk. On 3 March, Grudinin visited Usolsky pig farm, where he talked with employees of the company, and later met with voters in Irkutsk. In addition, Grudinin also held a meeting with the Governor of the Irkutsk Oblast Communist Sergey Levchenko.

On 6 March, Pavel Grudinin held a meeting with voters in Pavlovsky Posad in the Moscow Oblast.

On 10 March, in Moscow on Revolution Square held a rally of the Communist Party, Left Front and National Patriotic Forces of Russia "For Fair Elections!". Speaking at the rally, Grudinin said that in December 2017, when he was nominated for President, he believed that the elections would be really fair, but during the campaign he turned information attacks. Grudinin said that this is due to the fact that the government was afraid of his victory. He urged his supporters not to believe the Federal media, come to the polls and vote for him. Ending his speech, Grudinin said the slogan "Our cause is right! Victory will be ours!". In addition to Grudinin, the Communist party leader Gennady Zyuganov, coordinator of the Permanent Meeting of National Patriotic Forces of Russia Vladimir Filin, Left Front leader Sergei Udaltsov, as well as other supporters of Pavel Grudinin also spoke at the rally. The rally lasted an hour and ended with shouts of "Grudinin is our President!". Initially, it was planned that up to 5,000 people would come to the rally, however, only 700 people came to it.

Results of Pavel Grudinin by federal subjects

== Program ==
On 10 January 2018, the program of Pavel Grudinin became officially published, consisting of 20 items.

1. The change of economic strategy. The priority will be the welfare of the people, not the oligarchs. The use of Russia's wealth, its natural, industrial and financial resources for the service of the people.
2. The restoration of the economic sovereignty of Russia. Withdrawal from the WTO.
3. Credit resources – the recovery of the economy. The decrease in Bank interest.
4. New industrialization, modernization of the economy and its output to innovation.
5. Ensuring food security of Russia, overcoming a situation when much of the food is imported from abroad. The return of the GOSTs and the introduction of criminal liability for falsification of food products.
6. Our historic task is to ensure the revival of the "provincial" Russia. Equalization of opportunities of regional budgets. Gasification of the country.
7. Price controls on basic foods and commodities, to housing prices.
8. Taxes – in the interests of justice and development. The introduction of a progressive tax. The abolition of value added tax, transport tax, and the Platon system.
9. Recovery guarantees for labor and 8-hour working day, providing people with work and a decent salary. Minimum salary of 25,000-30,000 rubles.
10. The destruction of the social sphere will be stopped. Free and qualitative secondary and higher education and health care.
11. Mothers and children will receive full support. Equating the monthly child allowances to the subsistence level of the child. Increasing the payment of monthly benefits by one and a half to three years.
12. Citizens a decent pension. The adoption of the law on "children of war". Maintaining the current age of retirement (60 for men and 55 for women). The return of indexation of pensions to working pensioners. Cancellation of the reduction factor of 0.54 for military retirees. Establishment of the average old-age pension – not less than 50% of the average wage.
13. We will protect the spiritual health of the nation. Support for museums, theaters, libraries.
14. We guarantee massive construction of high-quality and affordable housing. Introduction of the provision of flats or houses for young families, the elimination of dilapidated housing. Declining mortgage rates to 3-4%. For many children and young families, interest-free loan for up to 30 years.
15. To curb the greed of the moneylenders. The introduction of criminal liability for involvement in a bonded transaction, the prohibition of "correctors" activities and assignment of debt obligations of the citizens.
16. To ensure the protection of nature.
17. To ensure the defense capability and security of the country.
18. A fair trial will be on the side of the law, the citizen and the society, not the oligarchy. True independence of the court and the investigating authorities from the executive power, election of judges, distribution of the competence of juries in cases of "extremism", based on the 282-th article, and for corruption crimes of higher officials.
19. System restore democracy and popular representation. The President will be accountable to the People and the Parliament. The procedure of impeachment will be simplified. No one will have the right to be President for more than two terms of 4 years in his life. A Supreme State Council will be established, without the approval of which no crucial decision will be taken.
20. Improving the quality of public administration. Enter responsibility of the President for the formation of the Cabinet of Ministers, and the government's responsibility for its actions. Approval of the composition of the government will occur in the State Duma. All candidates for ministerial posts will be publicly justified the President.

== People ==
Pavel Grudinin's campaign manager is Gennady Zyuganov.

== Controversies ==
=== Criticism ===
Some Russian politicians of the left-wing have negatively perceived the nomination of Grudinin as presidential candidate of the Communist party. The main reasons for criticism is that Grudinin is a businessman, that he is representative of the "bourgeois class" which Communism is ideologically opposed to, and that Pavel Grudinin previously was a member of United Russia.

Grudinin faced overwhelming criticism from the Russian state media as his campaign was proving to be more successful than other challengers to the sitting President, as indicated by an Electoral Preference Poll, conducted by VCIOM Research Center three weeks before the results of the election, where Grudinin was placed firmly as a distant runner-up to Putin. Primarily, the media focused on his foreign monetary assets not being disclosed to the public, which, given his already established reputation as a wealthy businessman, hinted at the fraudulent nature of his Communist beliefs and ideology. Some segments directly accused him of lying and trying to hide his assets from the nation. Research undertaken by the Communist Party indicated that 80% of all TV coverage of Grudinin was negative.

Commenting on the nomination of Pavel Grudinin, the leader of the party of Communists of Russia, Maxim Suraykin, who also intends to participate in the elections, said:

Grudinin, according to the Declaration, had an income amounted to 752 million rubles in 2015. Can you imagine how much money he has? Plus, he's the owner of the farm, which in itself is worth several billion rubles. This is a real billionaire. A very rich guy. And I understand if he gave his income to the party, for the benefit of the Communist cause. Still, there are decent people who earn a lot. But he still was a member of "United Russia". If a person earned billions, if the person was in the ruling party (United Russia), and then suddenly changes one's shoes into the Communists, to put it mildly, it is strange. To such a man the question immediately arises. Therefore, it is clear that a large part of the potential electorate would not support such a candidate.

Sergey Mironov, leader of the social democratic party A Just Russia (which did not nominate any candidate for election, but supported Vladimir Putin) also criticized the nomination of Grudinin:

In my opinion, they made a mistake, a political mistake, and my long-cherished idea of inevitability in historical perspective, the closest Association the Communist party and A Just Russia with this step, this idea is close to its implementation, I think.

=== Foreign Bank accounts ===
The reason for the criticism of Pavel Grudinin was the existence of his foreign accounts which he has not specified when submitting documents to the CEC for participation in election. Namely, 5 accounts in an Austrian Bank, one of which was 14,390,000 rubles, and securities for a total value of 7.5 billion rubles. However, when applying for registration as a candidate, he pointed out that these accounts have already been closed.

However, this caused criticism Grudinina. So, Vladimir Zhirinovsky, commenting on the reports said the Communists finally turned in the direction of capitalism, as nominee on presidential election candidate–billionaire.

Chairman of the Board of deputies of Leninsky District of Moscow Oblast Valery Ventsal sent a letter to Prosecutor General Yury Chaika, asking to check the availability of the foreign accounts of the candidate in presidents of the Russian Federation Pavel Grudinin, when he ran for Moscow Oblast Duma and the District Council of Deputies. Ventsal asks "to undertake a review in relation to Mr. P.Grudinin the fact that he had accounts in foreign banks at the time of the election campaigns in the Moscow Oblast Duma in 2016, and in 2017, to representative bodies of local self-government of urban and rural settlements of the Leninsky municipal district". He also requests to check on the fact of provision by Grudinin to the tax office information about the presence of his accounts and other assets in foreign banks, and in the case of any, verification of payment of the accounts of taxes in the budget of Russia.

The Communist party explained that Grudinin in foreign accounts opened in the period from January to December 2017 for the treatment of relatives, was 37 million roubles, not 7.5 billion, as previously reported by some media.

On 2 February, CEC reported that Pavel Grudinin has 4 outstanding accounts with foreign banks, which were not informed by the Federal Tax Service: 2 accounts in Austria and 2 in Switzerland. Because of what Grudinin was summoned to the Central Election Commission. At the same time, according to the Deputy Chairman of the CEC Nikolay Bulaev, these are problems that are not unsolvable, and Pavel Grudinin said that he has no problems with Bank accounts.

On 12 February, Nikolay Bulaev said that the still not resolved issues with the 2 accounts in Swiss banks. According to article 37 of the Federal Law on Elections of the President of the Russian Federation, stating that "candidates must submit a written notice to that do not have accounts, store cash funds and valuables in foreign banks located outside the Russian Federation, does not possess or use foreign financial instruments". According to Nikolai Bulaev, Pavel Grudinin on 8 January 2018, presented such a document to the CEC, as well as another document, which was written on 4 February. But due to the fact that there are contradictions between the documents submitted by Pavel Grudinin and the information provided by the Federal tax service, the CEC may re-apply to the Federal Tax Service on issues related to Pavel Grudinin's accounts. At the same time, the Chairman of the Central election Commission Ella Pamfilova called on Pavel Grudinin to independently provide the CEC with information on the closure of all its foreign accounts. According to her, this issue is "extremely unpleasant", as Pavel Grudinin's opponents in this regard demand to cancel the decision on its registration and to withdraw his candidacy from election, and Grudinin's supporters accuse the CEC of excessive severity to him.

On 5 March, it became known that at the request of the Russian Federal Tax Service, the Swiss authorities reported 11 more Grudinin accounts in Swiss banks, one of which was opened in the form of precious metals, namely gold. After the appearance of information about these accounts, the CEC announced the holding of a special meeting on March 7, to address the issue of the revealed facts of false information filed by Grudinin during the registration of the candidate. Initially it was assumed that it was to withdraw from the election. However, at the meeting the CEC decided not to remove Grudinin, but at the same time, to add information about established facts of unreliability of data on accounts on the special information poster devoted to the candidate. Each candidate has such posters, they should be hung at polling stations on the election day, they contain information about the candidate, including information about the money.

=== Real estate in Spain ===
On 2 February, appeared in the media information about the acquisition of family Pavel Grudinina home in Spain. According to media reports, the property was purchased in the fall of 2017, it is located in the city of Salou, on the Mediterranean coast, the total area of the property is more than 200 square meters, and the cost is €781,614.

The head a press-services of Communist party Alexander Yushchenko, commenting on these posts said that neither Pavel Grudinin, nor his spouse or his minor children do not own any house in Spain. However, later, Grudinin admitted that the property in Spain belongs to his children. Commenting on this, he said, ""every presidential candidate has children, everyone has some property. You think I'm gonna be in charge of my kids, what to do, who to marry? They are adults, they do business, they have a good income, but I have nothing to do."
