= National Patriotic Forces of Russia =

National Patriotic Forces of Russia Национально-патриотические силы России
- Abbreviation: NPSR
- Leader: Gennady Zyuganov; Sergey Mironov
- Founded: 17 May 2010
- Preceded by: People's Patriotic Union of Russia
- Ideology: Russian nationalism Soviet patriotism Factions: Left-wing nationalism Left-conservatism; Social conservatism Neo-Sovietism; National-populism; National conservatism Communism; Marxism–Leninism; Economic socialism Anti-fascism; Anti-imperialism; Anti-liberalism
- Political position: Big tent
- Members: CPRF; SRZP; Left Front; PDS NPSR; DPA; DZNS; SSO; PVR; Party of Business (until 2024); NOMP

Party flag

The National Patriotic Forces of Russia (NPSR; Russian: Национально-патриотические силы России, romanized: Natsionalʹno-patrioticheskiye sily Rossii), also known as Left-wing Patriotic Forces, is a Russian informal pole of left and right nationalist political groups that are allied with the Communist Party of the Russian Federation.

These forces are not legally formalized, but since 2012 there has been a Permanent Conference of the National Patriotic Forces of Russia, which claims to unite all Russians patriots: from social democrats to monarchists.

== History ==
Leftists and nationalists have formed eclectic alliances in Russia since perestroika, a clear example being Alexander Nevzorov's Nashi movement in the early 1990s.

The National Salvation Front was a coalition of leftists and nationalists formed to oppose President Yeltsin and directly involved in the side of the Supreme Soviet during the 1993 constitutional crisis.

After the NSF was banned, leftists and nationalists rallied around the Communist Party of the Russian Federation. In 1996, the People's Patriotic Union of Russia (NPSR) alliance was created by the CPRF, which united part of the social conservative and left-nationalist movements in order to support Zyuganov's presidential candidacies.

After the conflicts between Zyuganov and the leader of the NPSR Gennady Semigin, the latter left the Communist Party of the Russian Federation and founded the Patriots of Russia party, and the activity of the NPSR was de facto terminated.

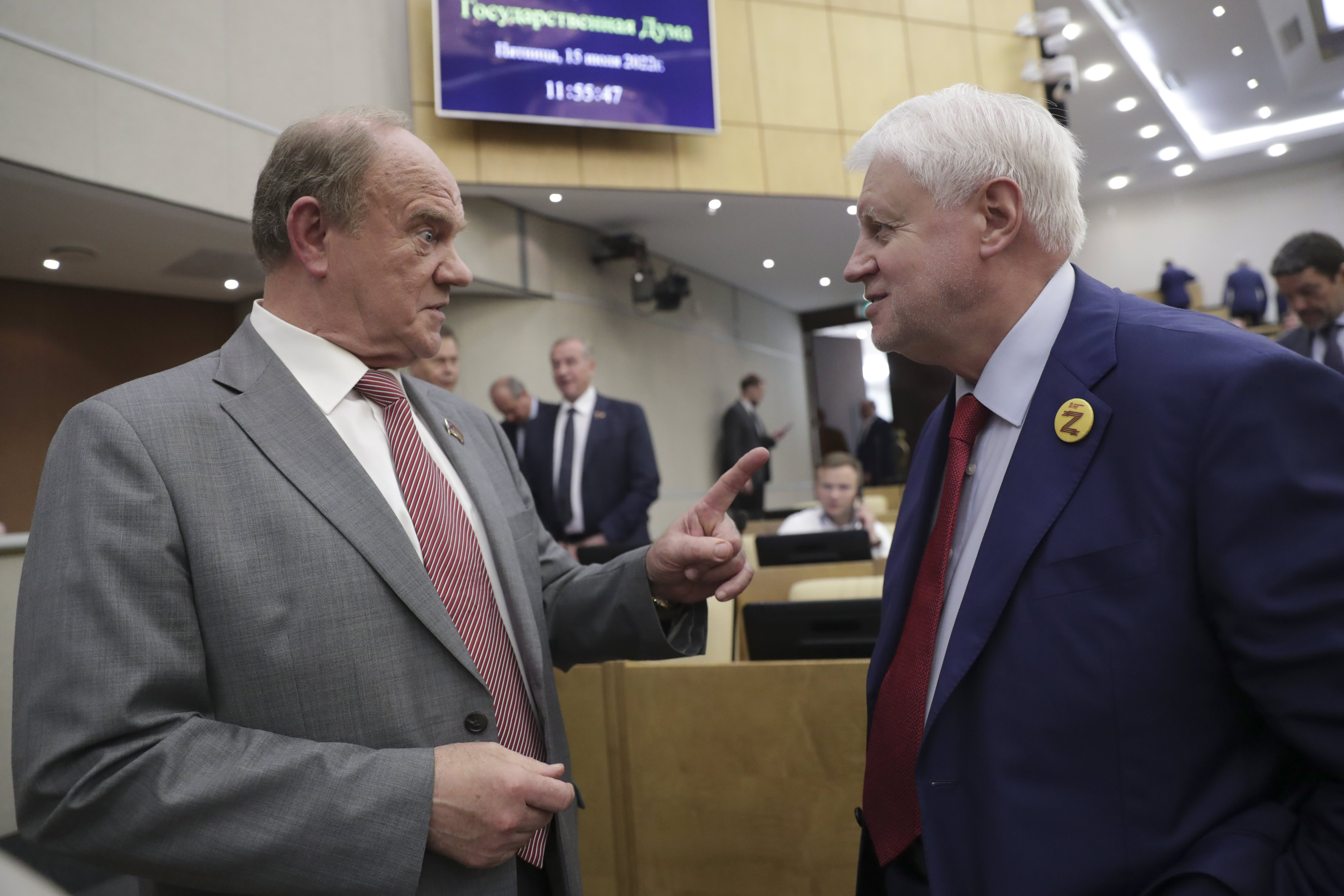
At the end of July 2022, talks began about the unification of the CPRF and the SRZP into one "left-patriotic" party

In July 2022, the leader of the CPRF Gennady Zyuganov stated he would allow the party to merge with the left-conservative party, A Just Russia — For Truth, but only if they adopted the Communist program. The day before, the leader of the A Just Russia Sergey Mironov said that he "does not see any obstacles to the creation in Russia of a large coalition of left-wing patriotic forces".

== PDS NPSR ==
Permanent Conference of the National Patriotic Forces of Russia Постоянно действующее совещание Национально-патриотических сил России
- Abbreviation: PDS NPSR
- Leader: Vacant; Vladimir Filin († 2021)
- Founder: Yury Boldyrev
- Founded: August 2012
- Ideology: Russian nationalism Social conservatism Neo-Sovietism
- Political position: Syncretic: Economic: Far-left; Cultural: Right-wing
- National affiliation: Alliance with CPRF, Left Front, DPA, and Союз советских офицеров
- Members: SRN; Great Russia; Narodopravie; All-Slavic Union; People's Patriotic Organization of Russia; Union of the Officers of Russia; Union of Military Sailors and others
- Colours: White; Gold; Black
- Slogan: "Conscience Justice Democracy" (Russian: «Совесть Справедливость Народовластие»)

Party flag

Website
- pdsnpsr.ru

In August 2012, with the participation of Yury Boldyrev, the Permanent Conference of the National Patriotic Forces of Russia was founded.

The PDS NPSR, together with the Communist Party of the Russian Federation and the Left Front, participated in the nomination and presidential campaign of Pavel Grudinin in the 2018 Russian presidential election.

Later, after the presidential elections, the PDS of the NPSR and the Communist Party of the Russian Federation supported the continuation of cooperation.

As of May 2019, the PDS NPSR includes 29 movements.

The movement strongly opposed the amendments to the Russian constitution in 2020.

== See also ==
- National Bolshevism
- Red–green–brown alliance
- Union of Slavic Forces of Russia
