= Blowing Up Russia =

Book by Alexander Litvinenko and Yuri Felshtinsky

- Author: Alexander Litvinenko; Yuri Felshtinsky
- Original title: ФСБ взрывает Россию
- Translator: Geoffrey Andrews
- Subject: Russian apartment bombings
- Publisher: S.P.I. Books
- Publication date: 2002
- Pages: 322 pp.
- ISBN: 978-1-56171-938-9
- OCLC: 481235634

Blowing Up Russia: Terror from Within (Russian: ФСБ взрывает Россию, romanized: FSB vzryvayet Rossiyu, lit. 'FSB blows Russia up') is a book written by Alexander Litvinenko and Yuri Felshtinsky. The authors describe the Russian apartment bombings as a false flag operation that was guided by the Russian Federal Security Service to justify the Second Chechen War and bring Vladimir Putin to power. The story was initially printed by Yuri Shchekochikhin in a special issue of Novaya Gazeta in August 2001 and published as a book in 2002. In Russia, the book was prohibited because it divulged state secrets, and it was included in the Federal List of Extremist Materials. However, it was published in more than twenty other countries and translated into twenty languages.

== Background ==
In July 1998, Putin was appointed as the director of the Federal Security Service (FSB). In August 1999, he became the prime minister of Russia.

In September 1999, a series of explosions hit four apartment blocks in the Russian cities of Buynaksk, Moscow and Volgodonsk, killing more than 300, and injuring more than 1,000.

According to an interview, Yuri Felshtinsky started collecting materials about the bombings in 1999, not thinking that the FSB had anything to do with the terrorism acts. He was deeply disturbed after discovering that the bombings were in fact committed by the FSB. He consulted with Viktor Suvorov, a writer and former GRU officer, who defected to the UK in 1978. When asked: "Would you personally blow out the building with innocent people after receiving the order?", Mr Suvorov replied: "Of course I would. That is our job. We always follow the order." Felshtinsky contacted Alexander Litvinenko who became a coauthor of the book. Felshtinsky had known Litvinenko since 1998.

Shortly after the bombings, the ex-Secretary of the Security Council of Russia Lieutenant General Alexander Lebed claimed that he is "almost certain" that the bombings were organized by the Russian government. In 2002, Lebed died in a helicopter crash. According to Lebed's associates, the crash was caused by an explosive device.

== Publication and government response ==
The first edition of the book was published in 2002.

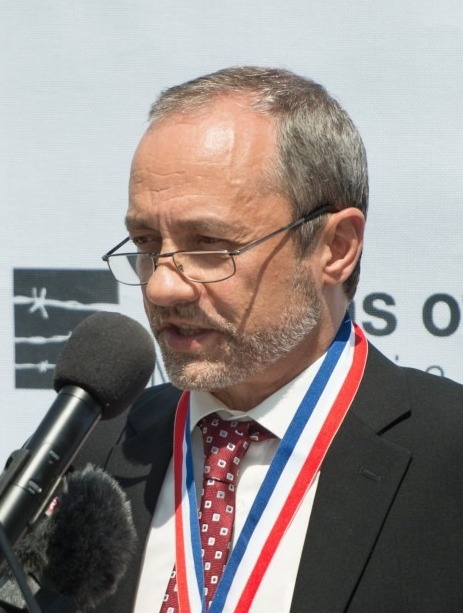
Journalist Alexander Podrabinek who attempted to sell copies of the book in Russia

On December 29, 2003, Russian Interior Ministry and FSB units seized 4,376 copies of the book intended for Alexander Podrabinek's Prima news agency. FSB lieutenant Alexander Soima said that the book was confiscated as a material evidence in the criminal case No 218 initiated in June 2003 for disclosing state secrets. Podrabinek was summoned by the FSB on January 28, 2004. He refused to answer the questions.

In response to FSB's banning their books, the authors granted the right to print and distribute the books in Russia to "anybody who wishes to do so" free of charge.

Lawyer Mikhail Trepashkin said that he warned Litvinenko in 2003 about a menace from FSB confirmed by two sources. Trepashkin quoted the words of FSB officer Victor Shebalin saying that everyone who was involved in publication of the book Blowing up Russia would be destroyed and that FSB had deployed three agents to Boston to assassinate Yuri Felshtinsky.

In 2006, one of the book's authors (Litvinenko) was poisoned, allegedly by FSB agent Andrey Lugovoi. The European Court of Human Rights ruled that Russia was responsible for the assassination. According to the results of an inquiry by the British Government, "The FSB operation to kill Mr. Litvinenko was probably approved by... President Putin."

After Litvinenko was poisoned, confiscated copies of the book were kept by the FSB and destroyed in 2007 "due to death of the accused" Litvinenko.

In 2015 the book was included in the Federal List of Extremist Materials, preventing any form of publication in Russia.

== Reviews ==
Alexander Goldfarb said the book "would haunt Putin the way the image of the killed Tsarevich haunted Boris Godunov." According to Oleg Gordievsky, "For clues as to who wanted Alexander Litvinenko dead, you need look no farther than his book Blowing Up Russia" Sunday Times described the book as "A vivid condemnation of the Putin regime". In a review for The Independent, Anne Penketh said that the book is "a densely written text" and "(f)or those seeking a reason for the killing of Litvinenko, this book contains the possible motive, although it does not mention the role of Berezovsky — sworn enemy of Putin — in bringing it out in the first place." Historian Robert Service for The Guardian: "In 2002 their [Litvinenko and Yuri Felshtinsky] jointly written book failed to appeal to established publishers in the west. It has taken Litvinenko's murder for the book to appear in this updated edition ... as vivid a condemnation of the Putin regime as has yet been written.".

Viv Groskop for The Observer wrote, that the book "rehashes the well-known argument that the 1999 terrorist bombing campaign that precipitated Russia's second war with Chechnya and propelled Putin to the presidency was in fact organised by Russia's own security services. David Satter, a former Moscow correspondent for the Financial Times, has written authoritatively on the subject." According to her, the book focuses "in excruciating, rambling detail" on the failed attempt by FSB agents to plant a bomb in a residential building in the city of Ryazan, but it fails to describe convincingly the overall involvement of Russian state security services in organizing the bombings.

== Film ==
In 2001, the documentary film Assassination of Russia was made on the basis of the book by French producers Jean-Charles Deniau and Charles Gazelle. Yuri Felshtinsky and Alexander Litvinenko worked as consultants for the film. The film was shown on TV in Estonia, Latvia, and Lithuania, but not in Russia.

== Bibliography ==
- Felshtinsky, Yuri; Litvinenko, Alexander (2007). Blowing Up Russia. translated from Russian by Geoffrey Andrews and Co. (2nd ed.). London: Gibson Square Books. ISBN 978-1-903933-95-4.
- Felshtinsky, Yuri; Litvinenko, Alexander (2002). FSB Vzryvayet Rossiyu (in Russian) (1st ed.). Liberty Publishing House, Inc. ISBN 0-914481-63-0. Full text available at Yuri Felshtinsky's web site.
