= Assassination of Russia =

2002 French documentary film

- Produced by: Jean-Charles Deniau; Charles Gazelle
- Release date: 2002
- Country: France

Assassination of Russia (Russian: Покушение на Россию) is a 2002 documentary film that describes the September 1999 Russian apartment bombings as a terrorism act committed by Russian state security services.

The film was created in 2001 by French producers Jean-Charles Deniau and Charles Gazelle. Yuri Felshtinsky and Alexander Litvinenko worked as consultants for the film; the film was made on the basis of their book Blowing Up Russia: Terror from Within.

The French producers initially worked for Russian TV company NTV to expand their program "Sugar of Ryazan" and later to TV-6. When TV-6 channel was closed by Russian authorities, the film was 70% completed. The remaining funds were provided by Boris Berezovsky.

Leader of party Liberal Russia, Sergei Yushenkov flew to the premiere on March 5, 2002, in London, to announce that his party was going to distribute copies of the film around Russia to demonstrate "how the secret services deceived Russian citizens".

This film was broadcast by the main TV channels of Estonia, Latvia, and Lithuania. Russian State Duma Deputy Yuli Rybakov brought a hundred copies to St. Petersburg, but they were confiscated at customs in violation of his parliamentary immunity. No TV station in Russia was able to show the film. Nevertheless, tens of thousands of copies were sold in Russia in 2002. Sergei Yushenkov presented the film at the Woodrow Wilson International Center for Scholars in 2002, decrying lack of civilian control over the Russian armed forces including the secret services. A staffer for the U.S. Senate Foreign Relations Committee said, "We just cannot go out and say that the president of Russia is a mass murderer. But it is important that we know it."

== See also ==
- Rebellion: the Litvinenko Case
