= Orthodoxy or death! =

Russian nationalist and religious fundamentalist slogan

Flag of the Union of Orthodox Banner-Bearers. "Orthodoxy or death!" is written in Russian above and in Greek below.

"Orthodoxy or death!" (Russian: Правосла́вие или смерть!, romanized: Pravoslaviye ili smert!; Greek: Ὀρθοδοξία ἢ θάνατος!, romanized: Orthodoxía í thánatos!) is a political slogan used by Russian nationalists and Eastern Orthodox fundamentalists. Since 2010 it has been recognised as part of the Federal List of Extremist Materials and banned in Russia.

== History ==
The slogan "Orthodoxy or death!" was first used by the Esphigmenou monastery in 1972, after it cut ties with the Eastern Orthodox Church as a form of protest against the Church's leadership entering into dialogue with Pope Paul VI. To the present day, it continues to ignore the broader Eastern Orthodox Church, as well as the Greek government.

"Orthodoxy or death!" entered into Russian religious and political discourse following the dissolution of the Soviet Union. According to Russian theologist Roman Lunkin, the slogan grew in popularity among conservative members of the Russian Orthodox Church, bolstered by support from celebrities who supported its use, such as Ivan Okhlobystin and Konstantin Kinchev. Additional supporters of the conservatives within the ROC came from Russian monarchists. A religious almanac under the name "Orthodoxy or death!" was published from 1997 to 1999.

A number of Orthodox political organisations in Russia also use the term, namely the Union of Orthodox Banner-Bearers. Its usage has been opposed by Patriarch Kirill of Moscow, who said in a 2009 to not trust individuals using it. After it was banned, however, some priests of the ROC, particularly archbishop Pitirim of the Diocese of Sykytvkar and Vorkuta spoke in defense of the slogan.

On 21 December 2010 the Cheryomushki District Court of Moscow said in a decision that the slogan "Orthodoxy or death!" was extremist, and ordered that it be placed on the Federal List of Extremist Materials. Its number on the list is 865.
