= Federal List of Extremist Materials =

List of works banned in Russia

Federal List of Extremist Materials (Russian: Федеральный список экстремистских материалов, Federal'nyy spisok ekstremistskikh matyerialov) is a list of works that are banned in the Russian Federation, primarily based on the Russian Internet Restriction Bill. It is compiled by the Ministry of Justice of the Russian Federation. Producing, storing or distributing (including spreading via the Internet, quoting in non-academic sources, and other forms of public information, considered to be a "distribution") the materials on the list is an offense in Russia.

As of 16 January 2023, this list includes 5,334 items. 106 items are already excluded from the list (although their numbers remained in the list).

The list includes publications and websites that criticize Russian authorities, such as the book FSB blows Russia up by Yuri Felshtinsky and Alexander Litvinenko (No. 2791), certain publications by Muslim theologians and Jehovah's Witnesses (No. 2904), certain antisemitic materials, the Navalny video, songs, video files, brochures and websites.

In 2012 Scientology books by L. Ron Hubbard were added to the list (No. 1171, 1172, 1173).

There is a separate list of people and organizations suspected of involvement in terrorism or extremism. The list is compiled by Rosfinmonitoring.

== Content ==
=== Religious literature ===
Church of Scientology

- Books (No. 1170—1176), including the book What is Scientology?

Jehovah's Witnesses

- Books, pamphlets, and selected issues of the Awake! and The Watchtower magazines, as well as a website and a mobile app

Islam

- Separate issues of the magazines Al-Wai and The Creation of Al-Wai (No. 38—44, 86–90, 137, 208–218, 283–286, 419–422, 434–435, 738–741)
- Said Nursî . Books from the Risale-i Nur collection (No. 45—58)
- Muhammad ibn Abd al-Wahhab. Biography (No. 77) and works.
- Ayatollah Khomeini. The Will (No. 143)

Falun Gong

- Books and brochures of the Falun Gong religious movement (No. 296—299)

=== Works of the leaders of the NSDAP and the Fascist Party of Italy ===
- Adolf Hitler. Mein Kampf (No. 604)
- Benito Mussolini. The Doctrine of Fascism (№ 608, 668), Memoirs 1942-1943 (№ 732), Third Way: Without Democrats and Communists (№ 2285)
- Heinrich Himmler. The SS Man and the Question of Blood (№ 767)
- Joseph Goebbels. The Diaries of 1945 (№ 795) and the novel Michael: A German Destiny in Diary Form (№ 2385)
- Alfred Rosenberg. Memoirs (№ 1648), The Myth of the Twentieth Century (№ 2532)
- Gottfried Feder. Program and Outlook of the NSDAP (№ 2000)

=== Musical works ===
- Aleksandr Kharchikov. "Prepare the lists!" (№ 493) and "Zhyds do not sow bread" (№ 1134)
- Timur Mutsuraev. 27 songs (№ 691, 2561, 2793, 3053, 3193, 3456—3457)
- Songs by the band Kolovrat (№ 785—794, 1101, 1223—1252, 2457, 2568, 3038, 3608—3609, 3760, 3955)
- Psyche. "Kill the Cop" (№ 805)
- Songs by the band 25/17 (№ 1730, 3248, 3780)
- Korrozia Metalla. "Kill the devils - save Russia" (№ 2072), "Nigger" (№ 2384), "Skinhead" (№ 2797), "Death to the tsunarefs" (№ 2835), "White power" (№ 2996), "Heil Fuhrer!" (№ 3012), "Dirty City", "I Walk Through Moscow", "Freedom or Death" (№ 3197), "Rap is feces" (№ 3933)
- Ensemble of Christ the Savior and Mother Damp Earth. "Synagogue" (№ 2443), "Breaking the crescent" (№ 2654), "You can't command the heart", "Crucify all these deputies", "Skinheads" (№ 3011), "Cut their full faces" (№ 3230), "Jews" (№ 3237), "Collider" (№ 4340), "Kill cosmonauts" (№ 4342)
- Instruktsiya po Vyzhivaniyu. "Kill a Zhyd" (№ 2617)
- Grot. "Smoke" (№ 3045)
- Orgazm Nostradamusa. "Kill a Teenager" (№ 4508)
- Elektricheskiye partizany. "Star and Automatic Rifle" (№ 5111)
- Nichego Khoroshego. "Molotov Cocktail" (№ 5148)
- Tsiryulnya im. Kotovskogo. "Native Land" (№ 5159)

=== Works by individual authors ===
- Works by Alexey Dobrovolsky (№ 6 - 10, 576)
- Henry Ford. The International Jew (№ 459, 2955)
- Writings by L. Ron Hubbard (№ 632-660), delisted 26 April 2011; Lectures for the PTS/SP course consisting of 9 audio cassettes and one book (№ 1170) was added on 20 March 2012.
- Henry Picker. Hitler's Table Talk (№ 711)
- Konstantin Rodzaevsky. The Last Will of a Russian Fascist (№ 861)
- Valery Yemelyanov. Dezionization (№ 970)
- Jürgen Graf. The Myth of the Holocaust: The Truth About the Fate of the Jews in World War II (№ 973)
- Eugen Dühring. The Jewish Question as a Question of Racial Character and Its Harmful Influence on the Existence of Peoples, on Manners and Culture (№ 979, 3329)
- Richard Wagner. Das Judenthum in der Musik (№ 1204)
- Grigory Klimov. God's People (№ 1456), Red Kabbalah (№ 1957), Protocols of the Soviet Wise Men (№ 1958)
- Dmitry Nesterov. Skins: Rus' is Awakening (№ 1482)
- Vladimir Dal (authorship disputed). Investigation about the murder of Christian babies by Jews and the use of their blood (№ 1494)
- Valentin Prussakov. Hitler without lies and myths (№ 1596)
- Édouard Drumont. La France juive (№ 1791)
- Alexander Sevastyanov. Russian Nationalism: Its Friends and Enemies (№ 2138) and What do the Jews want from us? (№ 2139)
- Maxim Martsinkevich. Restruct! (№ 2572)
- Alexey Shmakov. Jews in history (№ 2931) and International Secret Government (№ 4183)
- Michael Laitman. Secret Jewish Teachings. Part X. The Fruits of Wisdom (№ 3151)
- The text of The Dulles Plan to Destroy the USSR (Russia) (№ 3932), purported to be formulated by Allen Dulles, head of the CIA in 1953-1961. It is presented as a plan for the moral decay of Soviet society after the war. In reality, it is a selection of fragments of the 1981 edition of the novel "Eternal Call" by Anatoli Ivanonv.
- Oleg Platonov. The Mystery of the Protocols of Zion (№ 4347), Zion Protocols in World Politics (№ 4413), Russia and the World Evil (№ 5076), Ritual Murders (№ 5077), Crown of Thorns of Russia (№ 5078), The Mystery of Lawlessness (№ 5079), Judaism and Freemasonry (№ 5080)
- Raphael Lemkin. Soviet genocide in Ukraine (№ 4413)
- David Duke. The Jewish Question Through the Eyes of an American (№ 5104)
- James Mason. Siege

=== Other publications ===
- Appeal by the public organization Voice of Beslan To all who sympathize with the victims of the Beslan terrorist attack! to the President and Congress of the United States, the leaders of the countries of the European Union, and members of the European Parliament (№ 589).
- The article on the Chechen Republic in the Big Encyclopedia "Terra" (№ 680)
- A poster depicting a man who looks like the President of the Russian Federation Vladimir Putin, depicted with makeup on eyelashes and lips (№ 4071)

=== Films ===
- Fritz Hippler. The Eternal Jew (№ 5)
- Trailer of the amateur film Innocence of Muslims (No. 1589)
- YouTube blogger Ilya Maddyson's video Joke about the Quran (No. 4086)
- Secret and Explicit (The Aims and Acts of Zionists) (No. 5218)

=== Slogans ===
- "Orthodoxy or death!" (No. 865). Two courts took opposite decisions regarding this slogan.
- "Russia for Russians" (No. 866). As a SOVA Center report notes, "it is not clear whether the slogan is prohibited in its usual spelling or only with the letter 'ъ'".

=== Websites ===
- A number of materials from Kavkaz Center (No. 270, 339, 340, 351–355, 366, 367, 705)
- Ingushetia.org (No. 276, 709) and a number of materials from it (No. 661, 664)
- http://zhurnal.lib.ru/ (No. 381). The site was forced to change its domain to http://samlib.ru/.

=== Art works ===
- Graphic work by Alexander Savko from the series Mickey Mouse's Journey Through Art History with the gospel story The Sermon on the Mount (No. 1271)

=== Articles, leaflets, other printed and handwritten materials ===
- text "Adolf Hitler's last will and political testament" written by unknown author (No. 3178)
- text "The worship of the devil among the Jews in our time" written by unknown author (No. 5017)

=== Books and brochures ===
- Yu. G. Felshtinsky and A. V. Litvinenko. "FSB blows Russia up" (No. 2791)
- B. V. Stomakhin. "Violence as a method" (No. 5004)

=== Movies and videos ===
- video entitled "ISIS declaration to President Vladimir Putin" (No. 4095)
- video "Putin publicly, at a meeting of Jews admitted that he is a Jew", lasting 02 minutes 15 seconds (No. 4933)
- video titled "Evidence. Putin is building the Khazaria", starting with the words: "Russia is captured by Jews, Putin is the President of the Khazar Republic", ending with the words: "Think about which nation in Russia he cares about?" (No. 4969)

=== Pictures and images ===
- A poster depicting Adolf Hitler in NSDAP uniform with the words "Happy Birthday, National Socialist. 14/88. Be good and kill [censored] today" (No. 2702)

=== Poetry ===
- A. M. Byvshev's poem "Ukrainian patriots" (No. 2596), where he disagreed with Russian intervention in Donbas and supported military resistance by Ukrainians.

== See also ==
- Index Librorum Prohibitorum
