= Yuri Felshtinsky =

Russian-American historian (born 1956)

- Юрий Фельштинский
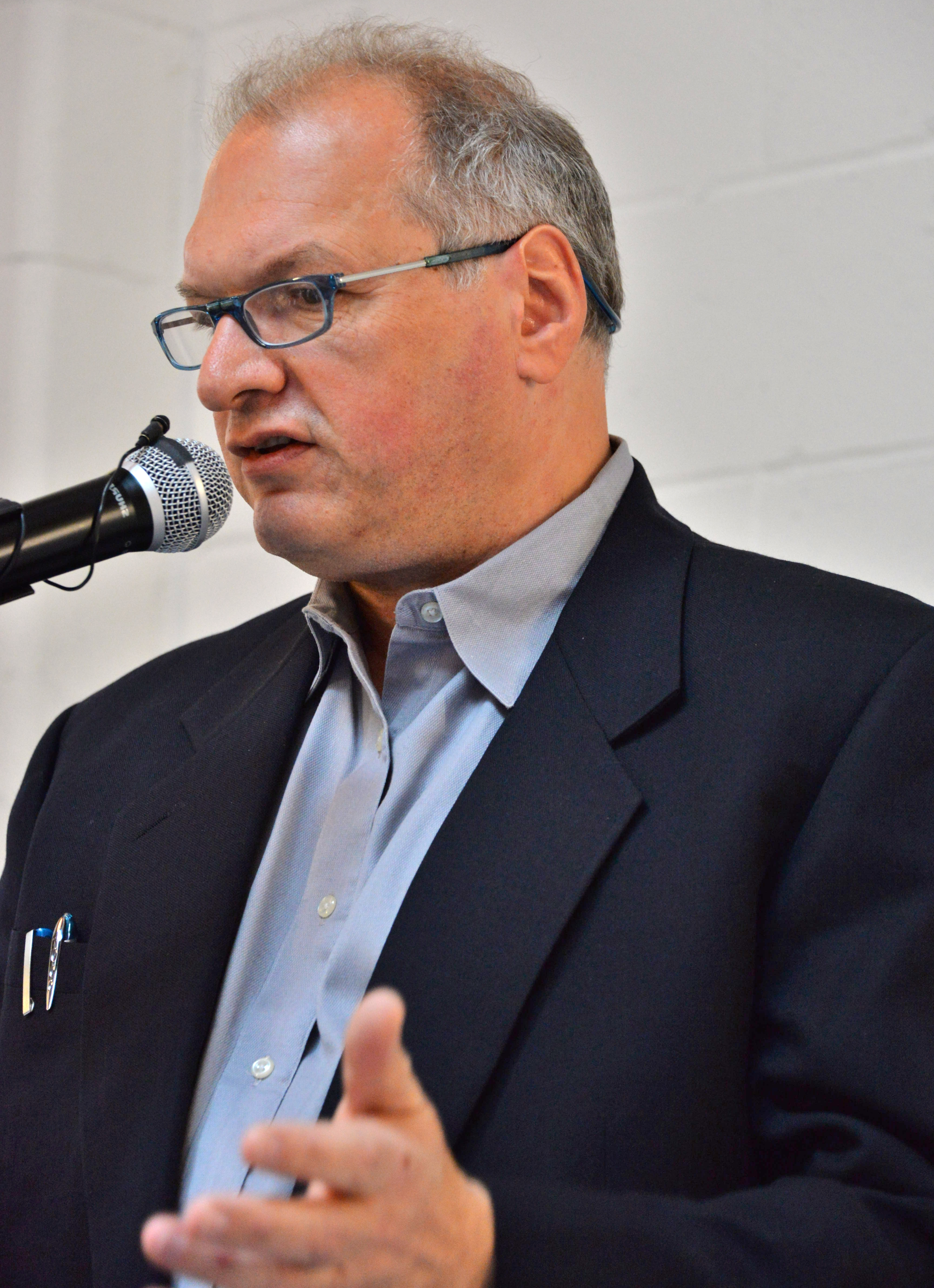
- Born: 7 September 1956 (age 70); Moscow, RSFSR, Soviet Union
- Citizenship: Russia; United States
- Education: Moscow State Pedagogical University; Brandeis University; Rutgers University
- Occupations: Historian; Writer
- Notable work: The Bolsheviks and the Left SRs; Towards a History of Our Isolation; The Failure of the World Revolution; Blowing up Russia; The Age of Assassins

Yuri Georgievich Felshtinsky (Russian: Юрий Георгиевич Фельштинский, born 7 September 1956) is a Russian American historian. Felshtinsky has authored a number of books on Russian history, including The Bolsheviks and the Left SRs (Paris, 1985), Towards a History of Our Isolation (London, 1988; Moscow, 1991), The Failure of the World Revolution (London, 1991; Moscow, 1992), Blowing up Russia (with Alexander Litvinenko), and The Age of Assassins (with Vladimir Pribylovsky).

== Education ==
Felshtinsky's parents died when he was 17 years of age. He began studying history in 1974 at Moscow State Pedagogical University. A couple of years later, he decided to emigrate from the Soviet Union to Israel, travelling first to Vienna. But instead of going from Vienna to Israel, he went further to the United States, where he arrived in April 1978 and there subsequently continued his studies. He graduated from Brandeis University and earned his PhD in history from Rutgers University. In 1993, he returned to Moscow and defended his Doctor of Science thesis at the Institute of Russian History of the Russian Academy of Sciences, becoming the first non-Russian citizen to earn a doctorate from a Russian university.

== Career ==
Felshtinsky has published a number of books on the history of the Communist movement. In one of those books, Leaders the Mobsters, he described the Bolshevik party as a Mafia-like organization where "almost no one died by a natural cause". According to Felshtinsky, the list of assassinations includes poisoning of Vladimir Lenin, Felix Dzerzhinsky, and Maksim Gorky by Genrikh Yagoda on orders from Joseph Stalin, murders of Mikhail Frunze, Vyacheslav Menzhinsky, and Leon Trotsky, and the poisoning of Stalin by associates of Lavrentiy Beria.

In 1998, Felshtinsky traveled back to Moscow in order to study the politics of contemporary Russia. At that time, he became acquainted with Alexander Litvinenko, a lieutenant colonel of the Federal Security Service (FSB). In 2000, Felshtinsky and Litvinenko began working on Blowing Up Russia, a book that describes the gradual appropriation of power in Russia by the security apparatus and details the FSB's involvement in a series of terrorist acts that took place between 1994 and 1999. In August 2001, several chapters from Blowing Up Russia were published in a special edition of the newspaper Novaya Gazeta. In 2002, the book became the basis for a documentary film, Blowing Up Russia (also known as Assassination of Russia). Both the book and the documentary were officially banned in Russia for "divulging state secrets". Until 2006, Felshtinsky continued working with Litvinenko on gathering additional materials documenting the FSB's involvement in the apartment house bombings of September 1999. According to the authors, the bombings were committed by the Russian Federal Security Service (FSB), as a false flag operation intended to justify the Second Chechen War.

In November 2006 Litvinenko died in London of acute radiation syndrome, three weeks after being poisoned with polonium-210. (See Poisoning of Alexander Litvinenko). In 2007 investigator Mikhail Trepashkin said that, according to his FSB sources, "everyone who was involved in the publication of the book Blowing Up Russia will be killed," and that three FSB agents had made a trip to Boston to prepare the assassination of Felshtinsky. After the 2013 death of exiled oligarch Boris Berezovsky, who sponsored the book, Felshtinsky suggested that Berezovsky was killed by Putinites.

He released a book in 2007 entitled "Blowing Up Russia: The Secret Plot", whose thesis was on Vladimir Putin's violent methods.

In September 2019 he opined that defector Oleg Smolenkov would be in danger of assassination by the Russian state for as long as he lived.

=== After the 2022 Russian invasion of Ukraine ===
Prior to the invasion, in January 2022, Felsthtinsky suggested that it would be suicidal for Russia. In April 2022 he was interviewed by Ali Velshi on Russia's state of censorship. In July 2022 he thought that now was "our September 1939 moment", and he was interviewed by Steven Edginton on the same topic. In October 2022 he alleged that Putin wants a combined Russian-Belarusian-Ukrainian army to invade Moldova and the Balkans. His November 2022 book, Ukraine, the first battle of the third world war? was launched at the Rafael del Pino foundation. In February 2023 he opined Ukraine this year has created the most combat-ready army in Europe.

In January 2023 he opined in an interview with a Georgian newspaper that "The West needs to understand the only way to end this war is to win it." He was interviewed by Times Radio in April 2024 on the same subject.

In the wake of the summer 2023 Prigozhin mutiny he opined that Sergey Naryshkin and Nikolai Patrushev were acting in the shadows to propel the convict toward his fate.

He was interviewed by an Australian newspaper about how Russia's secret service took control of the country's top office, in 2023 to promote his most recent book From Red Terror to Terrorist State. And he opined in September 2023 to Le Monde that "Nothing will change in Russia until the security services are dismantled".

In the run-up to the 2024 US presidential election Felshtinsky, in an interview with an Estonian newspaper, bemoaned the fact that Trump would influence events in Ukraine negatively, were he to become president. The week of Donald Trump's second inauguration and consequent strangulation of military aid to Ukraine, Felshtinsky opined that "the idea that the fate of Ukraine is decided by Trump and Putin is reminiscent of what happened in Munich in 1938", and denounced the "appeasement policy" of the US president.

He was interviewed by Times Radio on 16 August 2025, one day after the 2025 Trump-Putin summit in Alaska, and thought it might lead to war with NATO.

== List of selected publications ==
- The legal foundations of the immigration and emigration policy of the USSR, 1917 - 1927 (Glasgow, 1982)
- The Bolsheviks and the Left SRS (Paris, 1985)
- Trotsky's Notebooks, 1933–1935. Writings on Lenin, Dialectics, and Evolutionism. (New York, 1986)
- Towards a History of Our Isolation (London, 1988; Moscow, 1991)
- Conversations with Bukharin (Moscow, 1993)
- Lenin, Trotsky, Stalin and the Left Opposition in the USSR, 1918 - 1928 (Paris, 1990)
- The Failure of World Revolution (London, 1991; Moscow, 1992)
- Big Bosses (Moscow, 1999)
- Felshtinsky, Yuri; Litvinenko, Alexander (2007). Blowing up Russia. translated from Russian by Geoffrey Andrews and Co. London: Gibson Square Books. ISBN 978-1-903933-95-4.
- Felshtinsky, Yuri; Pribylovsky, Vladimir (2008). The Age of Assassins. The Rise and Rise of Vladimir Putin. London: Gibson Square Books. ISBN 978-1-906142-07-0.
- Pribylovsky, Vladimir; Felshtinsky, Yuri. The Operation Successor. A political portrait of Vladimir Putin (Text online) (in Russian).
- Leaders the mobsters (Text online) (in Russian).
- with Vladimir Pribylovsky, The Corporation. Russia and the KGB in the Age of President Putin, ISBN 1-59403-246-7, Encounter Books; 25 February 2009, description.
- Felshtinsky, Yuri (26 October 2010). Lenin and His Comrades: The Bolsheviks Take Over Russia 1917-1924. New York: Enigma Books. ISBN 978-1-929631-95-7. description.
- Boris Gulko, Yuri Felshtinsky, Vladimir Popov, Viktor Kortschnoi, The KGB Plays Chess: The Soviet Secret Police and the Fight for the World Chess Crown. Russell Enterprises, Inc. 2011, ISBN 1-888690-75-5.
- Yuri Felshtinsky and M. Stanchev. World War III. Battle for Ukraine, Our Format (Ukraine), 2015. (Фельштинский Ю., Станчев М. Третья мировая. Битва за Украину. — К.: Наш формат, 2015), ISBN 978-966-97425-9-9.
- Yuri Felshtinsky, Vladimir Popov, From Red Terror to Mafia State: Russia's State Security in the Struggle for World Domination Encounter Books, 2022, ISBN 1-641772-55-7
- Yuri Felshtinsky and M. Stanchev, Blowing up Ukraine: The Return of Russian Terror and the Threat of World War III, Gibson Square Books Ltd, 2022, ISBN 1-783341-91-2
- Yuri Felshtinsky, Многоходовка века: Дональд Трамп и Дмитрий Рыболовлев на поводке у Кремля ("The Multi-step Play of the Century: Donald Trump and Dmitry Rybolovlev on the Kremlin’s Leash"). ISIA Media Verlag, 2024

== Interviews ==
- "Interview with experts..." (in Russian). Radio Liberty. 3 November 2007. Archived from the original on 2 February 2009.
- Marr, Andrew (4 February 2007). "The Litvinenko affair". BBC News.
