= Denis Gariyev =

Russian far-right activist and militant

- Native name: Денис Валиуллович Гариев
- Born: 11 March 1978 (age 48); Khabarovsk Krai, Russian SFSR, Soviet Union
- Allegiance: Russia
- Service years: 2014–present
- Rank: Commander
- Commands: Imperial Legion
- Conflicts: Central African Republic Civil War; Second Libyan civil war; Syrian civil war; Russo-Ukrainian War; War in Donbass; Russian invasion of Ukraine

Denis Valiullovich Gariyev (Russian: Денис Валиуллович Гариев, born March 11, 1978) is a Russian neo-Nazi, a leader of the Russian Imperial Movement and the head of its paramilitary wing, the Imperial Legion (Russian: Имперский легион).

Denis Gariyev and other members of the RIL reportedly actively participated in combat operations during the War in Donbas.

== Sanctions ==
In 2020, he, together with the Movement and its three leaders, was designated as a global terrorist and blacklisted by the United States.

On 16 December 2022 he was also sanctioned by the European Union.

The EU sancion describes him as follows:

Denis Gariyev is the head of the ‘Russian Imperial Legion’, a paramilitary wing of the Russian Imperial Movement (RIM), a white-supremacist group founded by Stanislav Vorobyov in 2002. This paramilitary group is actively fighting in the war of aggression against Ukraine on behalf of the Russian Federation. On social media, the ‘Russian Imperial Legion’ describes its involvement in the Russian war against Ukraine as “contributing to reconnaissance and assault missions”.

Denis Gariyev has participated in the war of aggression against Ukraine and was wounded in early 2022. Denis Gariyev has actively recruited volunteer fighters to join his paramilitary organisation in the fight against Ukraine on his Telegram channel. In addition to their fighting in Ukraine, the Russian Imperial Legion has provided paramilitary-style training to white supremacists in the European Union, actively working to rally these types of groups into a common front against their perceived enemies.

In his capacity as leader and commander of the Russian Imperial Legion, Denis Gariyev is responsible for, supporting or implementing actions or policies which undermine or threaten the territorial integrity, sovereignty and independence of Ukraine.
