= Yury Boldyrev =

Russian economist and politician

- Юрий Болдырев
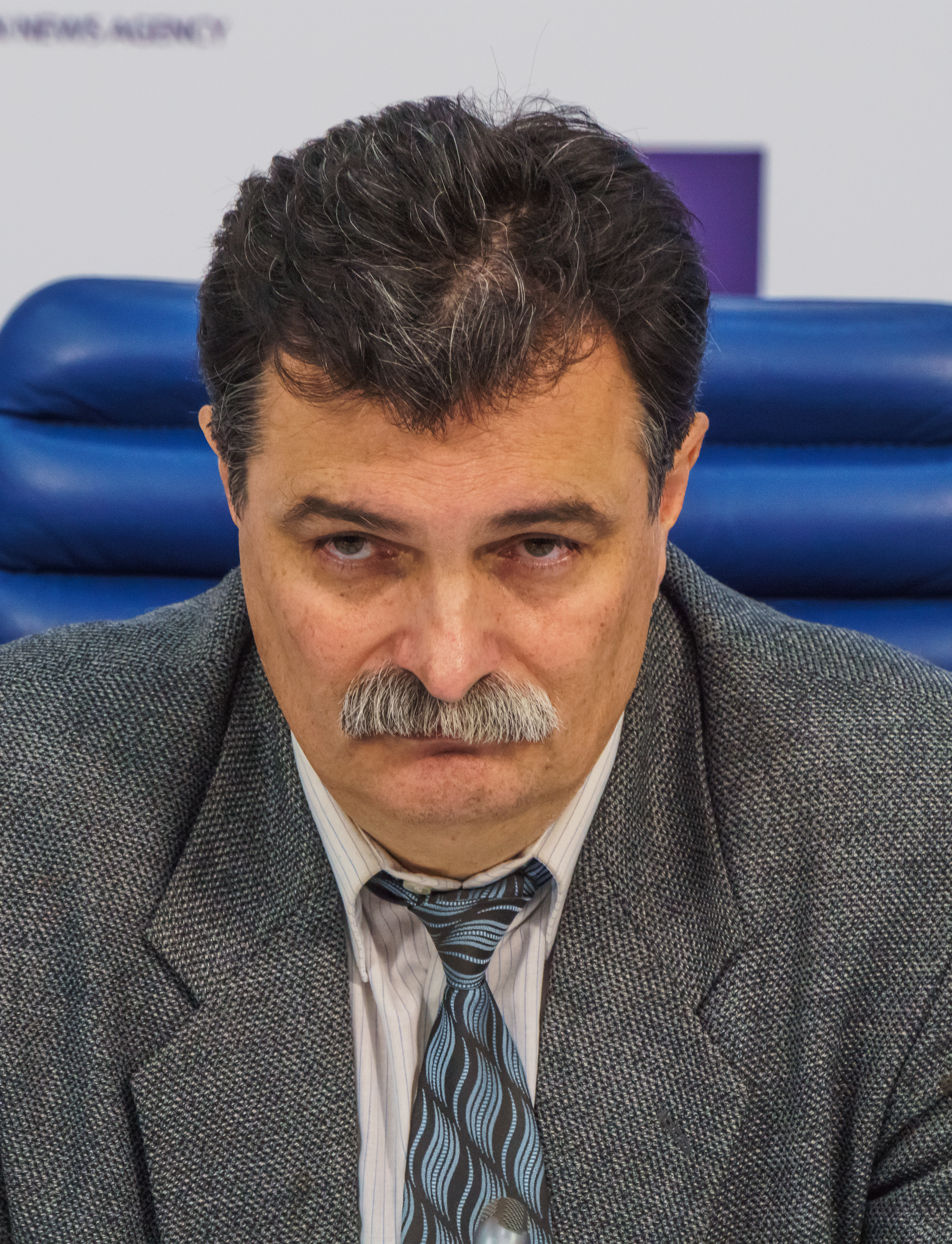
- Boldyrev in 2018

Deputy Chairman of the Accounts Chamber of Russia
- In office 18 January 1995 – 31 January 2001
- Succeeded by: Alexander Semikolennykh

Senator from Saint Petersburg
- In office 12 December 1993 – 18 January 1995
- Succeeded by: Yury Kravtsov

Personal details
- Born: 29 May 1960 (age 65) Leningrad, Russian SFSR, Soviet Union
- Party: PDS NPSR (2012–present)
- Other political affiliations: Communist Party (1987–1990); Yabloko (1993–1995)
- Yury Boldyrev's voice Boldyrev on the Echo of Moscow program, 25 May 2006

Yury Yurievich Boldyrev (Russian: Юрий Юрьевич Болдырев, born 29 May 1960) is a Russian economist and politician, he was a Senator from Saint Petersburg from 1993 to 1995, and Deputy Chairman of the Accounts Chamber of Russia from 1995 to 2001. Boldyrev was one of the founders of the Yabloko party, but left in 1995.

== Biography ==
Born in 1960 in Leningrad in family of a military sailor.

He graduated from Saint Petersburg Electrotechnical University (1983) and Saint Petersburg State University of Economics (1989).

From 1989 to 1991, he was a Deputy of the USSR from Moscowsky, district of Leningrad.

From 1990 to February 1992, Boldyrev was member of the Supreme consultative and coordinating Council under the Chairman of the Supreme Soviet of the RSFSR, and then under President Boris Yeltsin.

In February 1992, he was advisor to the government of Russia. From March 1992 to March 4, 1993 — Chief State inspector of the RSFSR, the chief of control management of presidential Administration of the Russian Federation.

From December 1993 to December 1995 Yury Boldyrev was Senator from St. Petersburg.

In autumn 1993 he became one of the founders of the Yavlinsky-Boldyrev-Lukin electoral association (then Yabloko party), but on September 1, 1995, he left the party because of conflicts: first under the Central Bank law, then on access transnational capital to Russian natural resources (the Law of the "Production Sharing Agreement").

From March 1995 to January 2001 - Deputy Chairman of the Accounts Chamber of Russia.

After retiring in 2001, the year the civil service was engaged in journalism and public activities.

In 2012, participated in an attempt to nominate General Leonid Ivashov to the President of Russia. Then he was the confidant of the presidential candidate Gennady Zyuganov - he participated in the televised debates against the representatives of the candidates Vladimir Putin and Mikhail Prokhorov. He took part in the creation of a Permanent Conference of the National Patriotic Forces of Russia.

== Family ==
Yury Boldyrev is married. There is a son Oleg, a graduate student of Moscow State University.
