= Union of Orthodox Banner-Bearers =

Union of Orthodox Banner-Bearers Союз православных хоругвеносцев
- Abbreviation: SPKh (English); СПХ (Russian)
- Leader: Leonid Simonovich-Nikshich (1999-2022)
- Founded: June 1992; 34 years ago
- Headquarters: Moscow, Russia
- Newspaper: Russian News
- Ideology: Orthodox nationalism Christian fundamentalism Russian ultranationalism Pan-Slavism; Absolute monarchism Tsarist autocracy Homophobia; Anti-Darwinism
- Political position: Far-right
- Religion: Russian Orthodox Church
- National affiliation: Russian National Front
- Colours: Black; Gold; White
- Slogan: "Orthodoxy or death!" (Russian: "Православие или смерть!")

Party flag

Website
- pycckie.org

The Union of Orthodox Banner-Bearers (SPKh; Russian: Союз православных хоругвеносцев; СПХ; Soyuz pravoslavnykh khorugvenostsev, SPKh) is a Russian nationalist-fundamentalist organization that identifies itself as part of the Russian Orthodox Church, though the church has implicitly repudiated that claim. The organisation was led by Leonid Simonović-Nikšić (d.2021) who co-founded the group in 1992. The Union's stated primary aim is to "resurrect the spirit" of Russian Orthodoxy, by conducting processions with banners and icons in Moscow, other parts of Russia.

The group became famous for its use and promulgation of the phrase "Orthodoxy or Death!," and its association with violent skinhead reactionaries. In 2009 the head of the Russian Orthodox Church, Patriarch Kirill, denounced this slogan and said to "beware" those who used it, calling it "dangerous, false and intrinsically contradictory":

[I]f we hear fervent calls to battle, to division, to the salvation of Orthodoxy even to death, when we hear such slogans as, "Orthodoxy or death," we need to beware of such preachers. The Lord never said, "My teaching or death." Not one apostle said, "Orthodoxy or death." Because Orthodoxy is eternal life, joy in the Holy Spirit, joy of life, beauty of life, but death is decay, the result of the fall, and the devil’s influence. Among us even today appear, from time to time, false teachers who tempt the people with the call to save Orthodoxy, to save its purity, and who repeat that dangerous, sinful, and contradictory slogan, "Orthodoxy or death." In the eyes of such people you will not find love; in them burns the demonic fire of pride, the striving for Church power, and the destruction of Church unity.

— Patriarch Kirill of Moscow, Homily on the Sunday of Orthodoxy (March 8), 2009

A Moscow court later agreed in a decision denouncing the phrase as "extremist."
