= Union of the Russian People (2005) =

Russian monarchist political organization founded in 2005

Union of the Russian People Союз русского народа
- Abbreviation: URP (English); SRN (Russian)
- Leader: Main Council
- Founder: Vyacheslav Klykov
- Founded: 21 November 2005; 20 years ago
- Headquarters: Moscow, Russia
- Newspaper: Right look
- Ideology: Monarchism; Orthodox fundamentalism Russian nationalism Traditionalist conservatism
- Political position: Right-wing to far-right
- National affiliation: Permanent Conference of the National Patriotic Forces of Russia; Russian National Front
- Colours: Black; Gold; White
- Slogan: "For Faith, Tsar and Fatherland!" (Russian: "За Веру, Царя и Отечество!")
- Anthem: God Save the Tsar!

Party flag

Website
- srn.rusidea.org

The Union of the Russian People (URP or SRN; Russian: Союз русского народа; СРН; Soyuz russkogo naroda, SRN) is a modern Russian Orthodox-monarchical organization, recreated in 2005 on the basis of the ideology of the pre-revolutionary Union of the Russian People.

== History ==
=== Creation ===
On November 22, 2004, a meeting was held in Moscow, chaired by the Russian sculptor Vyacheslav Klykov, the Coordinating Council for the Reconstruction of the Public Movement "Union of the Russian People" on the basis of the continuity of the pre-revolutionary Union of the Russian People. The founding (restoration, taking into account the declared continuity of the organization of the early 20th century) Congress was planned for the spring of 2005, Klykov was elected the head of the Coordinating Council. The meeting, in particular, was attended by Mikhail Nazarov, Vladimir Bolshakov, Alexander Shakhmatov, Alexander Kalina, Alexey Senin, Anatoly Stepanov.

The ride was planned to be held in the Cathedral of Christ the Saviour. However, at first the congress itself was postponed for six months, and after that the administration of the church refused the organizers to hold the congress "for technical reasons." Ultimately, the Congress took place in Moscow on November 21, 2005 (on the day of the celebration of the Synaxis of the Archangel Michael and other disembodied heavenly forces), in the Gorbunov Palace of Culture. Vyacheslav Klykov was elected the first chairman in the modern history of the Union. The Charter of the organization was also adopted. The governing body of the URP – the Supreme Council – beside Klykov, included 60 more people, in particular: Konstantin Dushenov, Leonid Ivashov, Mikhail Kuznetsov, Mark Lyubomudrov, Boris Mironov, Aleksandr Mikhailov, Mikhail Nazarov, Vladimir Osipov, Sergey Provatorov, Alexey Senin, Anatoly Stepanov, Alexander Turik, Alexander Shtilmark.

=== Further destiny ===
After the death of Vyacheslav Klykov in June 2006, General Leonid Ivashov took over as acting chairman of the URP. In November 2006, Ivashov was elected Chairman of the URP at the II Congress of the URP. Many of Klykov's associates considered Ivashov to be a non-church person and therefore were against the election. However, the spouses Mironovs and other supporters of Ivashov succeeded in attracting Sergei Kucherov's organization (patriots-atheists) to the Congress, endowing it with voting rights, and many active members of the URP were not allowed to attend the Congress and were not given the opportunity to vote, and thus Leonid Ivashov received the majority of votes. The reception room and website of the URP were transferred by the Ivashov to Kucherov's group.

In his very first public speeches on the People's Radio (1 December 2006), Ivashov stated that Klykov had “an Orthodox-monarchist marginal idea, it prevailed at the first Congress. But ... I will not lead such an organization. " In the next radio broadcast (2/14/2007), Ivashov said that Russian president Putin "proved himself not only the leader of Russia, but also one of the leaders of most of humanity," and declared support for Putin's policies. Meetings of the Main Council of the URP Ivashov began to be held under the portrait of Stalin. This turn of the course caused protests from the former Klykov cadres, who declared this to be a serious violation of the URP Charter and ideology.

In May 2007, the opposition held the III Congress of the URP in Irkutsk, which was supported by nine of the twelve Klykovo regional departments. They announced the restoration of the traditional ideology of the URP and elected Alexander Turik as chairman. Ivashov's supporters called it a split and did not recognize the decisions of the Congress.

In August 2007, the structures subordinate to Sergei Kucherov themselves rebelled against the "inactive", in their opinion, the Main Council of the URP Ivashov, demanded that the last "idiots – monarchist autocrats, preachers in cassocks with a 1905 charter of the year" III Congress ". Kucherov published a programmatic article "Attempts to reduce the entire breadth of today's views of Russians exclusively to Orthodoxy - the way to nowhere".As a result, the URP under the leadership of Ivashov split into two wings: Ivashov's and Kucherov's.

Thus, the name of the URP at this time (autumn 2007) was used:

- URP of L. G. Ivashov. Feature: orientation to support the "Party of power".
- URP of A. S. Turik. He continued the oppositional policy of V. M. Klykov. From May 2007 to October 2009, the structures of the NRC grew to 35 departments and groups. The largest Moscow department of the organization published a brochure outlining its point of view on the reconstruction of the URP in 2005 and the ensuing unrest in 2006–2007: "Union of the Russian People in Resistance to the New World Order."
- URP of S. I. Kucherov with an atheistic program. He began to argue that the URP was recreated not in November 2005, but earlier and with the participation of Kucherov (he was indeed on the Organizing Committee for the preparation of the 1st Congress, but was expelled from there by Klykov because of his anti-Orthodox views). Later, keeping the URP in the name of the site, Kucherov placed a subtitle: Site of the All-Russian public organization "Council of the Russian People". One of the characteristic activities is the movement "Without swastikas and icons".
- The "Holy Sergius Union of the Russian People" (HSURP), headed by Leonid Simonovich and Nikolai Kuryanovich, was established on November 22, 2006. They themselves claimed that their Union was created in 2002. There was no news about the activities of this URP and there is no (until 2006, Nikolai Kuryanovich was a full member of the LDPR and for this reason he could not be a member of the URP).
- "Union of the Russian People" of the neo-pagan trend, headed by A. T. Vetrov (had a website: https://web.archive.org/web/20090523010709/http://www.gardva.ru/srn/ - does not exist now) ... The congress was held on May 31, 2008. There is no other information on the activities of this URP.
- There is a website created under V. M. Klykov but not developed by the URP of V. V. Chubarov, who was part of the leadership of the URP under Klykov and refused to support the election of Ivashov in the summer of 2006. The content of the site is not updated and it does not represent the organization.
- There is also a small group of former members of the Moscow branch of the URP who did not recognize the election of M. V. Nazarov as chairman in March 2007. From time to time they publish leaflets. This group is headed by the artist V. B. Novikov.

In November 2008, L. G. Ivashov resigned as chairman of the URP and proposed to elect B. S. Mironov as his successor, but the majority of the members of his Main Council voted against. Mironov announced his resignation from the leadership. I. G. Starikov was elected temporary leader, but in January 2009 he announced his departure to the monastery. The URP (Ivashov) was headed by a triumvirate: N. D. Merkulov, V. F. Kalentyev, V. M. Erchak, subordinate to K. D. Grechnikov, who was not formally part of the Union, but served as a link between him and the state apparatus ...

On April 26, 2009, the Mironovs held their congress of the URP, at which they announced the election of B.S.Mironov as chairman.

On May 30, 2009, the remnants of the URP (Ivashov) held their third congress, at which they elected DN Merkulov as chairman. At the congress, the possibility of uniting Turik with the URP was discussed, for which the deputy of Turik M. V. Nazarov was invited to present the positions.

On October 18, at an expanded meeting of the Main Council of the URP Turik, it was decided to create a bilateral commission for unification and elect a general leadership at the future IV Congress.

The merger of the structures of Merkulov and Turik did not work out, since Merkulov decided to create the Monarchist Party of Russia instead of the URP and in the fall of 2010 held its founding congress. Thus, the Merkulov URP ceased to exist, all other URP structures no longer made themselves felt - except for the URP A. S. Turik. This URP, which originated from the structure of V. M. Klykov (2005), actually remained the only one that survived the schisms and increased its number to 45 departments and groups (as of autumn 2011).

In 2011, the chairman of the URP A. S. Turik, without approval from the Main Council of the URP, entered the leadership of the Ethno-political Association «Russians» (Demushkin - Belov), as well as the autocratic party of Merkulov and the organization of Sergey Baburin. The Main Council did not approve of these initiatives. In the spring of 2012, A. S. Turik resigned as chairman of the URP. Since no one wanted to be chairman, the URP was for some time managed collegially by the Main Council.

In September 2012, a group of heads of URP departments in Ukraine under the leadership of O. V. Zarubin (acting secretary of the SC), in violation of the URP Charter and the decisions of the URP General Council, called on the Union to focus on the support of Russian President Putin: “the Russian government ... began to defend our common national interests and embarked on the path of service, God-appointed power as an institution established by Him. " Those who disagreed with this turn of the URP's course were declared by Zarubin "enemies of Russia" and "accomplices of the CIA." There was a discussion. On October 2, 2012, the URP Court of Conscience and Honor condemned the actions of Zarubin's group as incompatible with URP membership and Orthodox norms of behavior. On October 20, 2012, in Moscow, the Main Council of the URP by a legal majority of votes expelled a group of Putin's supporters from the URP. At the same meeting, A. S. Turik was re-elected Chairman of the GS of the URP, as the reasons that hindered this had disappeared. Zarubin's group, being in the minority, nevertheless announced the "exclusion from the URP" of the members of the Main Council and continues its campaign under the name "representatives of the South Russian divisions of the Union of the Russian People".

== Books ==
- Союз Русского Народа в сопротивлении Новому мiровому порядку. 15 September 2017.
