= Great Russia (political party) =

Political party in Russia

Great Russia Партия «Великая Россия»
- Leader: Andrei Saveliyev
- Founder: Dmitry Rogozin
- Founded: 5 May 2007; 19 years ago
- Split from: Rodina
- Headquarters: Moscow, Russia
- Ideology: National conservatism Russian nationalism Patriotism; Orthodox traditionalism
- Political position: Far-right
- National affiliation: Permanent Conference of the National Patriotic Forces of Russia; Russian National Front
- Colours: Black; Gold; White
- Slogan: «The will of the nation instead of the dictatorship of the oligarchy!» (Russian: «Воля нации вместо диктатуры олигархии!»)

Party flag

Website
- www.velikoross.org

Great Russia (Russian: Великая Россия; romanized Velikaya Rossiya) is an unregistered far-right nationalist political party in Russia. The party has been led by former Rodina deputy Andrei Saveliyev since its founding.

== History ==
The party was formed in May 2007 by former Rodina leader Dmitry Rogozin at its founding congress, which included delegates from the Rodina bloc, the Congress of Russian Communities, as well as Alexander Belov, the leader of the anti-immigrant Movement Against Illegal Immigration.

Rogozin stated that the party would contest seats in the 2007 State Duma elections. Rogozin estimated that the party would obtain twenty five percent of the vote in the election, and opinion polls suggested the party had a good chance of crossing the seven percent threshold for representation in the State Duma.

On 24 July 2007, Great Russia was denied registration by the Federal Registration Service. The secretary of the party's ruling council, Sergei Pykhtin, said the party would either appeal the decision or submit new paperwork in an attempt to be registered. In September 2007, the party was again denied registration.
