= Alexander Byvshev =

Russian teacher and poet

Alexander Byvshev (Russian: Александр Бывшев) is a Russian teacher, and poet from Oryol Oblast. He was convicted in 2015 for writing pro-Ukrainian poetry. Six criminal extremism cases were open against him for writing poetry with criticism of Josef Stalin and other Soviet leadership during World War II and Russian military intervention in Ukraine.

== Biography ==
Byvshev taught German at a secondary school in the town of Kromy and was writing poetry In some of his published poems, such as "To Ukrainian patriots", he denounced the Annexation of Crimea and called Ukrainians to resist. His work was criticized in a local newspaper. In May, 2014, criminal proceedings were initiated against him for extremism. In 2015, he was accused for "incitement to hatred and enmity" and was sentenced to 300 hours of community service.

Byvshev was consequently fired and added to a "List of Terrorists and Extremists", the consequences of which included all his bank accounts being frozen. The SOVA Center, a Moscow-based non-profit organization that monitors human rights, described the local media campaign against Byvshev as reminiscent of a Stalinist campaign against "rootless cosmopolitans". After a consensus of editors, the Russian Language Wikipedia deleted its article about him.
