= Denis Nekrasov (Russian nationalist) =

Russian neo-Nazi (1985–2022)

- Денис Некрасов
- Born: 15 January 1985; Leningrad, Russian SFSR, Soviet Union (now Saint Petersburg, Russia)
- Died: 22 April 2022 (aged 37); Izium, Kharkiv Oblast, Ukraine
- Military career
- Allegiance: Luhansk People's Republic
- Branch: Prizrak Brigade; Russian Imperial Movement
- Service years: 2014–2022
- Nickname: Dobry
- Unit: Russian Imperial Legion
- Conflicts: Russo-Ukrainian War; War in Donbas; Battle of Debaltseve; Russian invasion of Ukraine; Battle of Izium

Denis Ivanovich Nekrasov (Russian: Денис Иванович Некрасов; 15 January 1985 – 22 April 2022) was a Russian nationalist and a leader of the Russian Imperial Movement, which has the goal of restoring the Russian Empire.

== Biography ==
Denis Nekrasov was a nationalist activist. He was a member of the Russian Imperial Movement and its armed faction, the Imperial Russian Legion. In 2014, he took part in hostilities during the Donbass War with several members of the Russian Imperial Movement serving with the pro-Russian Ukrainian separatists of the Luhansk People's Republic, in the Prizrak Brigade. In February 2022, he reportedly formed his own unit in the war against Ukraine with Denis Gariyev and other members of the RIL, which reportedly actively participated in combat operations.

On 18 April 2022, he replaced Denis Gariyev after he was seriously injured.

On 22 April 2022, he died after his vehicle hit a landmine near Izium.
