= Andrey Savelyev =

Russian politician

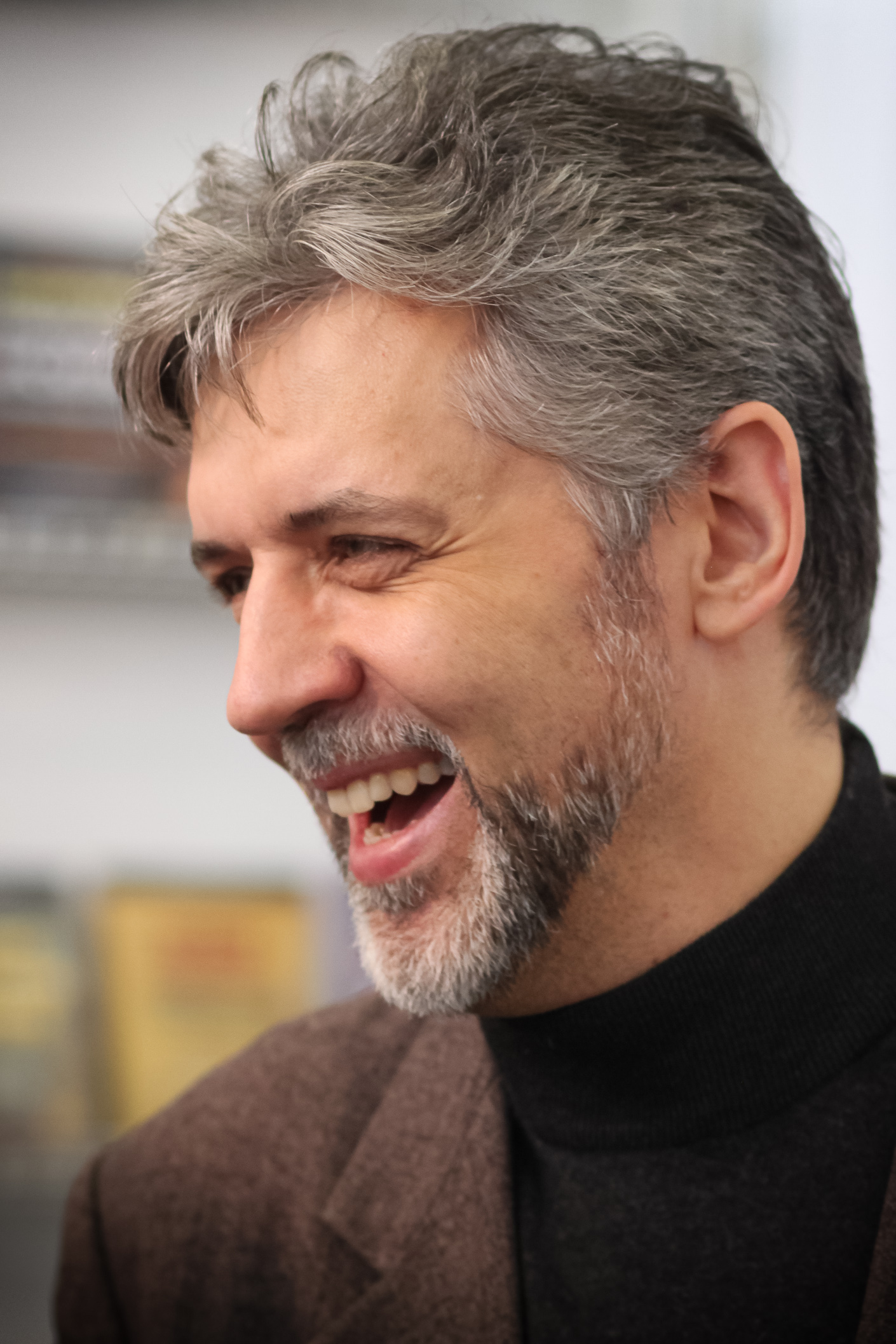
Andrey Savelyev

Andrey Nikolayevich Savelyev (Russian: Андрей Николаевич Савельев; born 8 August 1962) is a Russian politician and a former member of the State Duma. He was elected to the Duma in December 2003 as a member of the Rodina faction and is currently Chairman of the Great Russia Party. He did not stand for re-election in 2007 as his party was denied registration by the Central Election Commission of Russia.

== Background ==
Savelyev was born in Svobodny, Amur Oblast on 8 August 1962. He graduated from the Department of Molecular and Chemical Physics of the Moscow Institute of Physics and Technology in 1985. During the years 1985–1990 Savelyev worked at N.N. Semyonov Institute of Chemical Physics of Russian Academy of Sciences and Institute of Energy Problems in Chemical Physics, RAS. He received his Ph.D. in chemical physics in 1991. He also received a doctorate in political science in 2000. Before being elected to the Duma he was a university lecturer, and had been involved in a number of nationalist and patriotic political organisations in Russia.

== Political career ==
He was elected to the Moscow City Duma in 1990 and worked on Alexander Lebed's campaign for the Russian Presidency in 1996. Between 1999 and 2000 he worked as a speechwriter for the nationalist deputy Dmitry Rogozin. Savelyev is currently Chairman of the committee for the Commonwealth of Independent States and Relations with Compatriots in the Duma. He also served on the governing body of Rodina before the party's merger with the Russian Pensioners' Party and the Russian Party of Life in October 2006.

He gained some notoriety in 2004 when he was involved in a brawl with the leader of the Liberal Democratic Party of Russia Vladimir Zhirinovsky. Savelyev is a grand master at Tai Kwon Do and the brawl had to be broken up by other lawmakers. The footage of the fight is available on YouTube. Savelyev gained further recognition when, alongside Rogozin and three other Rodina deputies, he went on hunger strike to protest against changes to the system of social welfare in Russia. The strike lasted a week before being called off by the participants.

Following the merger of Rodina into Fair Russia, Savelyev refused to join the new party. He is now a member of the Congress of Russian Communities along with his former boss, Dmitry Rogozin. Since April 2007, Savelyev has been Head of the Committee of the Great Russia Party. From May 2007 he has been the party's Chairman.
