= Yury Mukhin (activist) =

Russian activist

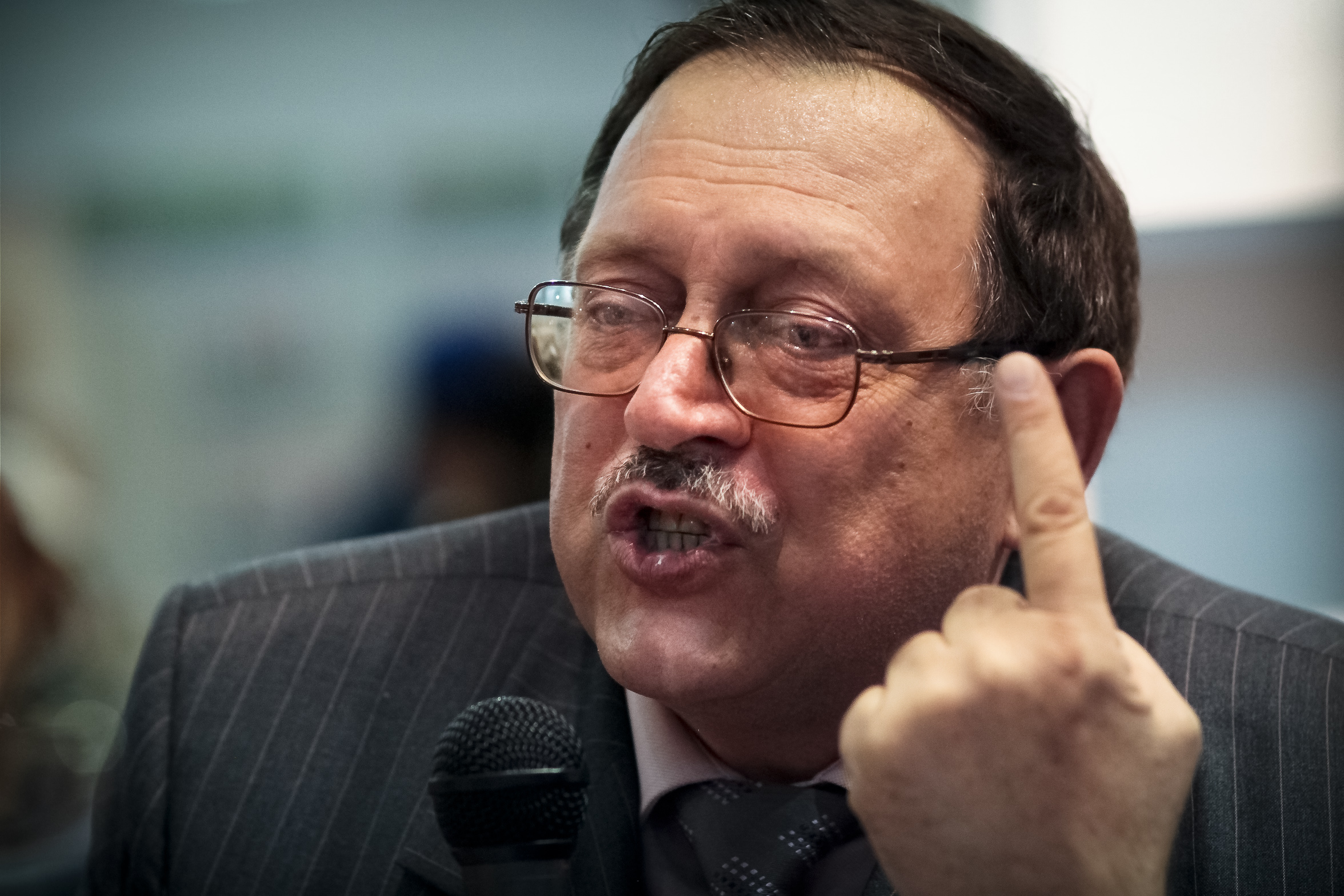
Yury Mukhin

Yuri Ignatievich Mukhin (Russian: Юрий Игнатьевич Мухин, born 22 March 1949, Dnipropetrovsk, Ukrainian SSR) is a Soviet and later Russian engineer, public activist, researcher and writer. One of the most criminally prosecuted by the Russian authorities – since the beginning of the century he was the defendant in several dozens of lawsuits, accused and defendant in three criminal cases. In July 2015, Yury Mukhin and three other IGPR ZOV members were arrested and jailed in Moscow. In the resolution on initiation of criminal case of 22 July 2015 (on the basis of which Barabash, Mukhin, Parfenov and Sokolov were arrested) it was specified that case against organizers of IGPR ZOV is brought for creation of initiative groups for carrying out a referendum; holding of the referendum to update the Constitution of the Russian Federation with the articles on responsibility of the Supreme authorities to the people; propaganda of the idea of adoption of the law which allows people of Russia to assess the activity of the President and members of the Federal Assembly. ("The repression of the initiators of the referendum in the Russian Federation»).

== Biography ==
He graduated from Dnipropetrovsk Metallurgical Institute in 1973. In 1995–2009, Mukhin was editor in chief of the Russian newspaper Duel. Mukhin was the leader of the People's Will Army (Армия Воли Народа) - a private organization advocating for constitutional changes in the Constitution of the Russian federation and for the adoption of legislation establishing the direct responsibility of the President and of the Federal Assembly of Russia for their activities. Mukhin is the main proponent in Russia of the denial of the Soviet responsibility for the Katyn massacre. Mukhin is also a supporter of the "Putin must go" campaign and his website encourages other Russians to support the petition for Putin's resignation from power.

== Views ==
Mukhin claims that Nazism was also a response to Zionism, and that Zionists were responsible for the Holocaust:

Once again I would like to remind the readers that the founding fathers of Zionism were fanatics, i.e. people not thinking of the future of Jews, but Israelis. Those of the Jews, who did not agree with Zionist objectives, were seen as worse than non- Jews—they were nothing else than garbage and their lives were nothing in the eyes of the Zionists. I have no doubts whatsoever, that during the course of World War II, the Germans did not exterminate the Jews on their own initiative, but were instigated to do so by the Zionists.

Mukhin's writings have been described as antisemitic by the Russian "Agency for Jewish News" ("Агентство Еврейских Новостей").

In December 2008 the Zamoskvoretzky District Court of Moscow (Замоскворецкий районный суд Москвы) issued an order to shut down the newspaper and on 18 June Mukhin himself was sentenced to a suspended prison term of two years for public calls for extremist activity. This happened one year after a previous attempt to shut down the newspaper failed, following an appeal in the Greater Moscow District Court.

In May 2009, Mukhin along with many other publicists, historians and human rights activists, welcomed the creation of the Historical Truth Commission.

He also supports Moon landing conspiracy theories and KAL 007 shootdown conspiracy theories. He criticizes Marxism, Einstein's theory of relativity, genetics and advocates Stalinist era achievements of T. D. Lysenko.
