= Robert Owen (judge) =

British judge

Sir Robert Michael Owen FRSA (born 19 September 1944) is a former British judge of the High Court of England and Wales.

== Legal career ==
Owen read law at the University of Exeter graduating with lower second class honours and then was called to the bar at Inner Temple in 1968 and elected an Inner Temple bencher in 1995. He was appointed a Recorder in 1987, being qualified as a deputy High Court judge from 1994, and made a Queen's Counsel in 1988. From 1991 to 1993, he served as Vice-Chairman of the London Common Law and Commercial Bar Association, and as its Chairman 1993 to 1995. In 1997, Owen served as Chairman of the General Council of the Bar, having served as Vice-Chairman the previous year. He was named an associate fellow of the Institute of Advanced Legal Studies and a Fellow of the Royal Society of Arts in 1998. He served as a governor of the College of Law from 1998 to 2004.

He was appointed a Justice of the High Court on 15 January 2001, receiving the customary knighthood, and assigned to the Queen's Bench Division. From 2005 to 2008, he served as a presiding judge for the Western Circuit, and he has been a member of the Judicial College board since 2011.

Owen chaired the 2015 inquiry into the poisoning of Alexander Litvinenko, which found that Andrey Lugovoy and Dmitry Kovtun were responsible for the assassination. The inquiry also found that there was a strong probability that Lugovoy and Kovtun were acting under the direction of the FSB, and that their actions were probably approved by both Nikolai Patrushev, Director of the FSB, and President Vladimir Putin. In the 2022 ITVX miniseries Litvinenko, Owen was portrayed by actor Brian Protheroe.

== See also ==
- Sir Robert Owen's Litvinenko Report, January 2016
