= Poisoning of Alexander Litvinenko =

2006 fatal poisoning of Russian defector

- Litvinenko at University College Hospital
- Location: 51°30′38″N 0°9′3″W; London
- Date: 1 November 2006
- Target: Alexander Litvinenko
- Attack type: Poisoning
- Weapon: Polonium-210
- Accused: Andrey Lugovoy and Dmitry Kovtun

Alexander Valterovich Litvinenko was an officer of the Russian Federal Security Service (FSB) and its Soviet predecessor, the Committee for State Security (KGB), until he left the service and fled the country in late 2000, defecting to the UK.

In 1998, Litvinenko and several other Russian intelligence officers said they had been ordered to kill Boris Berezovsky, a Russian businessman. After that, the Russian government began to persecute Litvinenko. He fled to the UK, where he criticised the Russian President Vladimir Putin and the Russian government. In exile, Litvinenko worked with British and Spanish intelligence, sharing information about the Russian mafia in Europe and its connections with the Russian government.

On 1 November 2006, Litvinenko was poisoned and later hospitalised. He died on 23 November, becoming the first confirmed victim of lethal polonium-210-induced acute radiation syndrome. Litvinenko's allegations about misdeeds of the FSB and his public deathbed accusations that Putin was behind his poisoning resulted in worldwide media coverage.

Subsequent investigations by British authorities into the circumstances of Litvinenko's death led to serious diplomatic difficulties between the British and Russian governments. In September 2021, the European Court of Human Rights (ECHR) ruled that Russia was responsible for the assassination of Litvinenko and ordered Russia to pay Litvinenko's wife €100,000 in damages plus €22,500 in costs.

The ECHR found beyond reasonable doubt that Andrey Lugovoy and Dmitry Kovtun killed Litvinenko. The Court's decision is in line with the findings of a 2016 UK inquiry. The UK concluded that the murder was "probably approved by Mr. [Nikolai] Patrushev, then head of the FSB, and also by President Putin."

== Background ==
Alexander Litvinenko was a former officer of the Russian Federal Security Service (FSB) who escaped prosecution in Russia and received in the United Kingdom political asylum in spring 2001. In his books, Blowing up Russia: Terror from Within and Lubyanka Criminal Group, Litvinenko alleged that the FSB organized the bombing of apartment buildings in Moscow and other Russian cities in 1999 to pave the way for the Second Chechen War, which brought Vladimir Putin to power. He accused Russian secret services of having arranged the Moscow theater hostage crisis, through their Chechen agent provocateur, and having organised the 1999 Armenian parliament shooting. He also claimed that the Al-Qaeda leader Ayman al-Zawahiri was under FSB control when he visited Russia in 1997.

Upon his arrival in London, he continued to support the Russian oligarch in exile, Boris Berezovsky, in his media campaign against the Russian government.

Just two weeks before his death, Litvinenko accused Putin of ordering the assassination of Anna Politkovskaya, a Russian journalist and human rights activist.

== Illness and poisoning ==
On 1 November 2006, Litvinenko suddenly fell ill. Earlier that day he had met two Russian ex-KGB officers, Andrey Lugovoy and Dmitry Kovtun, at the Pine Bar of the Millennium Hotel in London. Lugovoy is a former bodyguard of Russian ex-Prime Minister Yegor Gaidar (also reportedly poisoned in November 2006) and later the chief of security for the Russian TV channel ORT. Litvinenko had also had lunch at Itsu, a sushi restaurant on Piccadilly in London, with an Italian officer and "nuclear expert", Mario Scaramella, to whom he made allegations regarding Romano Prodi's connections with the KGB. Scaramella, attached to the Mitrokhin Commission investigating KGB penetration of Italian politics, claimed to have information on the death of Anna Politkovskaya, 48, a journalist who was killed at her Moscow apartment in October 2006. He passed Litvinenko papers supposedly concerning her fate. On 20 November, it was reported that Scaramella had gone into hiding and feared for his life.

In the evening, Litvinenko began vomiting and later developed bloody diarrhea. At one point, he could not walk without assistance. As the pain intensified, Litvinenko asked his wife to call an ambulance, before being hospitalized on 3 November. For several days, Litvinenko's condition worsened as doctors searched for the cause of the illness. Surrounded by friends, Litvinenko became physically weak, and spent periods unconscious. On his deathbed, Litvinenko stated to detectives that he believed President Putin had directly ordered his assassination. Three days before his death, photographs were taken of Litvinenko and released to the public. "I want the world to see what they did to me," he said.

=== Poison ===
On 3 November 2006, Litvinenko (under the pseudonym of Edwin Carter) was admitted to Barnet Hospital in north London, where he was initially treated for gastroenteritis. As his condition worsened, he told doctors his true identity and claimed to have been poisoned, before being transferred on 17 November to University College Hospital in central London for intensive care. Subsequently, his blood and urine samples were sent to the UK's Atomic Weapons Establishment (AWE), where they were tested for radioactive poison using gamma spectroscopy. No discernible gamma rays were initially detected, but a small gamma ray spike was noticed at an energy of 803 kilo-electronvolts (keV), barely visible above the background.

The BBC reported that by coincidence another scientist, who had worked on Britain's early atomic bomb programme decades before, happened to overhear a discussion about the small spike and recognised it as the gamma ray signal from the radioactive decay of polonium-210, which was a critical component of early nuclear bombs. On the evening of 22 November, shortly before his death, his doctors were informed the poison was likely to be polonium-210. Further tests on a larger urine sample using spectroscopy designed to detect alpha particles confirmed the result the following day.

Unlike some other sources of radiation, polonium-210 emits very little gamma radiation, but large amounts of alpha particles which are relatively difficult to detect with common radiation detectors such as Geiger counters. This explained why tests conducted by doctors and Scotland Yard at the hospital with Geiger counters were negative. Both gamma rays and alpha particles are classified as ionizing radiation, which can cause radiation damage. An alpha-emitting substance can cause significant damage only if ingested or inhaled, acting on living cells like a short-range weapon. Hours before his death, Litvinenko was tested for alpha-emitters using special equipment.

Shortly after his death, the UK's Health Protection Agency (HPA) stated that tests had established Litvinenko had significant amounts of the radionuclide polonium-210 (^{210}Po) in his body, and that those who had contact with Litvinenko may also have been exposed to radiation. Mario Scaramella, who had eaten with Litvinenko at Itsu, reported that doctors had told him the body had five times the lethal dose of polonium-210. However, the table where he had sat with Litvinenko on 1 November was later found to be free from radioactive contamination. On 30 November, it was reported that further medical tests had discovered Scaramella was not contaminated at all. British and US government officials said the use of ^{210}Po as a poison had never been documented before, and it was probably the first time anyone had been tested for the presence of ^{210}Po in their body.

It was later discovered that the poison was in a teapot at the Millennium Hotel's Pine Bar from which Litvinenko drank some green tea on 1 November. The symptoms seen in Litvinenko appeared consistent with an administered activity of approximately 1.85 GBq (50 mCi), which corresponds to about 10 micrograms of ^{210}Po. That is 200 times the median lethal dose of around 238 μCi or 50 nanograms in the case of ingestion. The studies of the biodistribution of ^{210}Po using gamma-ray spectrometry in post-mortem samples were used to estimate intake as 4.4 GBq.

=== Thallium – initial hypothesis ===
Scotland Yard initially investigated claims that Litvinenko was poisoned with thallium. It was reported that early tests appeared to confirm the presence of the poison. Among the distinctive effects of thallium poisoning are hair loss and damage to peripheral nerves, and a photograph of Litvinenko in hospital, released to the media on his behalf, indeed showed his hair to have fallen out. Litvinenko attributed his initial survival to his cardiovascular fitness and swift medical treatment. It was later suggested a radioactive isotope of thallium might have been used to poison Litvinenko. Amit Nathwani, one of Litvinenko's physicians, said "His symptoms are slightly odd for thallium poisoning, and the chemical levels of thallium we were able to detect are not the kind of levels you'd see in toxicity." Litvinenko's condition deteriorated, and he was moved into intensive care on 20 November. Hours before his death, three unidentified circular-shaped objects were found in his stomach via an X-ray scan. It is thought these objects were almost certainly shadows caused by the presence of Prussian blue, the treatment he had been given for thallium poisoning.

== Death and last statement ==
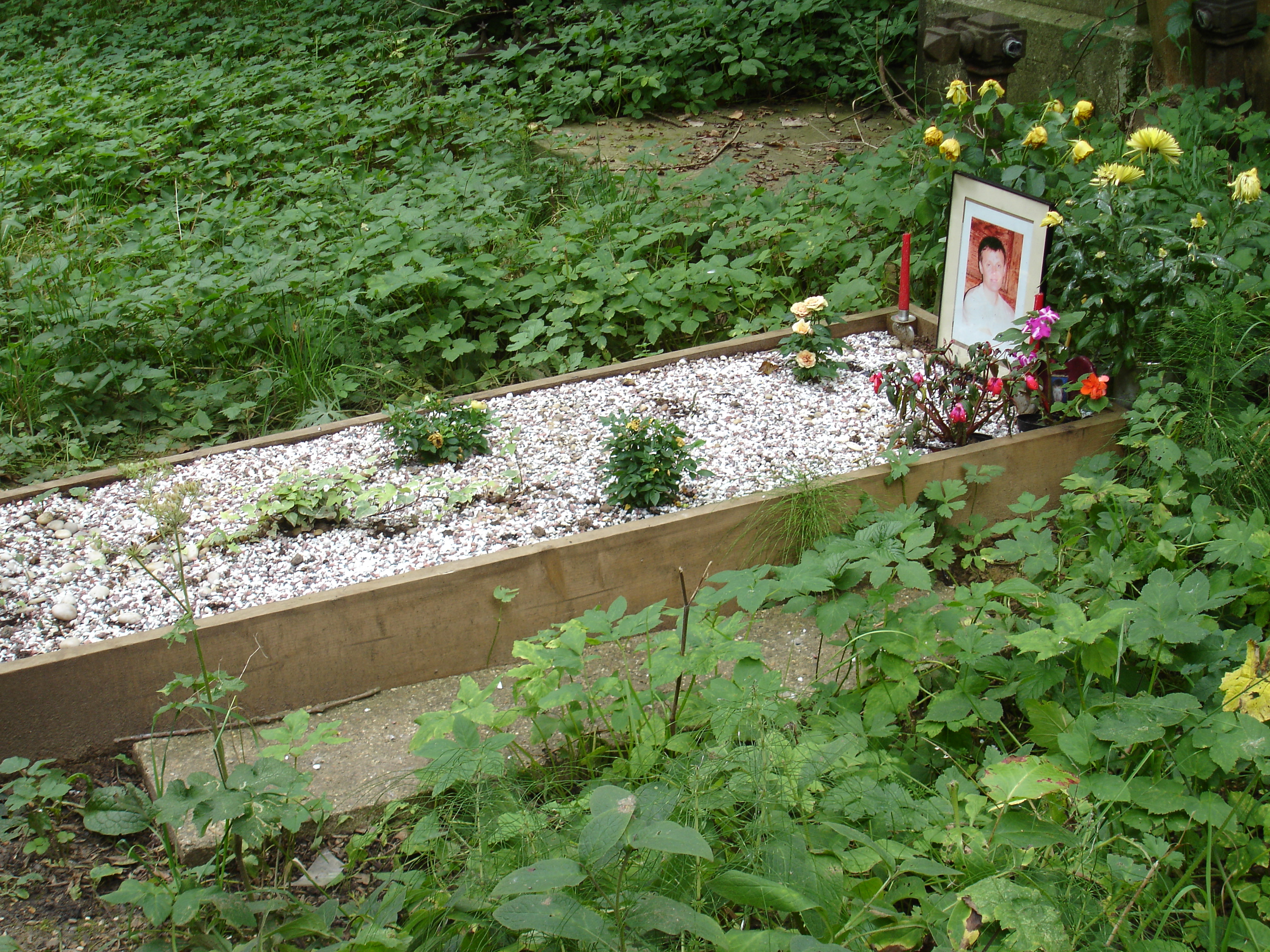
Grave of Alexander Litvinenko at Highgate Cemetery

Late on 22 November, Litvinenko's heart failed, and he died the following day; the official time of death was 21:21 at University College Hospital in London.

The autopsy took place on 1 December, conducted by Benjamin Swift and Nathaniel Cary, with a third pathologist observing from a safe distance. Litvinenko had ingested polonium-210, a poisonous radioactive isotope. Litvinenko's funeral took place on 7 December at the London Central Mosque, after which his body was buried at Highgate Cemetery in North London.

In his last statement he said about Putin:

...this may be the time to say one or two things to the person responsible for my present condition. You may succeed in silencing me but that silence comes at a price. You have shown yourself to be as barbaric and ruthless as your most hostile critics have claimed. You have shown yourself to have no respect for life, liberty or any civilised value. You have shown yourself to be unworthy of your office, to be unworthy of the trust of civilised men and women. You may succeed in silencing one man but the howl of protest from around the world will reverberate, Mr Putin, in your ears for the rest of your life. May God forgive you for what you have done, not only to me but to beloved Russia and its people.

== Investigation ==
=== Initial steps ===
Greater London's Metropolitan Police Service Terrorism Unit investigated the poisoning and death. The head of the Counter-Terrorism Unit, Deputy Assistant Commissioner Peter Clarke, stated the police would "trace possible witnesses, examine Mr. Litvinenko's movements at relevant times, including when he first became ill and identify people he may have met. There will also be an extensive examination of CCTV footage." The United Kingdom Government COBR committee met to discuss the investigation. Richard Kolko from the United States FBI stated "when requested by other nations, we provide assistance" – referring to the FBI joining the investigation for their expertise on radioactive weapons. The Metropolitan Police announced on 6 December 2006 that it was treating Litvinenko's death as murder. Interpol also joined the investigation, providing "speedy exchange of information" between British, Russian and German police.

=== Polonium trails ===
When it became clear that Litvinenko had been poisoned by a radioactive substance, a team of scientists were assembled to investigate how far the contamination had spread; traces of polonium-210 were subsequently found at more than 40 locations in and out of London. Detectives discovered three distinct polonium trails at three different dates, which according to the investigation suggests Andrey Lugovoy and Dmitry Kovtun made two failed attempts to administer polonium to Litvinenko before the final and successful one. The first attempt took place on 16 October 2006, when Lugovoy and Kovtun met Litvinenko in London; they tried to poison him at an office of Erinys International, a security company, at 25 Grosvenor Street, in Mayfair, and later had lunch with him at the Itsu sushi restaurant in Piccadilly Circus. On that occasion the amount of polonium ingested by Litvinenko was far lower than the lethal amount and he survived it, though he had indeed reportedly felt ill. Polonium trails left by the pair also started on 16 October; the Erinys boardroom, the Itsu restaurant, and their hotel rooms, at 65-73 Shaftesbury Avenue, were found to be contaminated.

Apparently, Lugovoy and Kovtun did not fully realize they were handling a radioactive poison. Journalist Luke Harding described their behaviour as "idiotic, verging on suicidal"; while handling a leaky container, they stored it in their hotel rooms, used ordinary towels to clean up leaks, and eventually disposed of the poison in the bathroom sink. On 17 October, perhaps realizing they contaminated their rooms, they prematurely checked out, moved to another hotel, and left London the next day.

Another unsuccessful assassination attempt took place on 25 October, when Lugovoy flew to London again. He left radioactive traces again in his hotel, Sheraton Park Lane, 58 Grosvenor Street, prior to meeting Litvinenko at the hotel's tearoom, but did not administer the poison, perhaps fearing detection by security cameras in the room. He again disposed of the poison via his room's bathroom sink, and left London.

The third attempt to poison Litvinenko took place at around 5 pm of 1 November in the Millennium Hotel in Grosvenor Square. The bus he travelled in to the hotel had no signs of radioactivity – but large amounts had been detected at the hotel. Polonium was subsequently found in a fourth-floor room and in a cup in the Pine Bar at the hotel. After the Millennium bar, Litvinenko stopped at the office of Boris Berezovsky. He used a fax machine, where radioactive contamination was found later. At 6 pm, Akhmed Zakayev picked Litvinenko up and brought him home to Muswell Hill. The amount of radioactivity left by Litvinenko in the car was so significant that the car was rendered unusable. Everything that he touched at home during the next three days was contaminated. His family was unable to return to the house in safety even six months later. His wife tested positive for ingesting polonium, but did not leave a secondary trail behind her. This suggested that anyone who left a trail could not have picked up the polonium from Litvinenko (possibly, including Lugovoy and Kovtun). The patterns and levels of radioactivity the assassins left behind suggested that Litvinenko ingested polonium, whereas Lugovoy and Kovtun handled it directly. The human body dilutes polonium before excreting it in sweat, which results in a reduced radioactivity level. There were also traces of Po-210 found at the Hey Jo/Abracadabra bar, Dar Marrakesh restaurant, and Lambeth-Mercedes taxis.

Besides Litvinenko, only two people left polonium trails: Lugovoy and Kovtun, who were school friends and worked previously for Russian intelligence in the KGB and the GRU, respectively. They left more significant traces of polonium than Litvinenko, indicating that they handled the radioactive material directly, and did not ingest it.

Lugovoy and Kovtun met Litvinenko in the Millennium hotel bar twice, on 1 November (when the poisoning took place), and earlier, on 16 October. Trails left by Lugovoy and Kovtun also started on that day. It was assumed that their first meeting with Litvinenko was either a rehearsal of the future poisoning, or an unsuccessful attempt at the poisoning.

Traces left by Lugovoy were also found in the office of Berezovsky that he visited on 31 October, a day before his second meeting with Litvinenko. Traces left by Kovtun were found in Hamburg, Germany. He left them on his way to London on 28 October. The traces were found in passenger jets BA875 and BA873 from Moscow to Heathrow on 25 and 31 October, as well as flights BA872 and BA874 from Heathrow Airport to Moscow on 28 October and 3 November.

Andrey Lugovoy has said he flew from London to Moscow on a 3 November flight. He stated he arrived in London on 31 October to attend the football match between Arsenal and CSKA Moscow on 1 November.

British Airways later published a list of 221 flights of the contaminated aircraft, involving around 33,000 passengers, and advised those potentially affected to contact the UK Department of Health for help. On 5 December, they issued an email to all of their customers, informing them that the aircraft had all been declared safe by the UK's Health Protection Agency and would be re-entering service.

=== British extradition request ===
British authorities investigated the death and it was reported on 1 December that scientists at the Atomic Weapons Establishment had traced the source of the polonium to a nuclear power plant in Russia. On 3 December, reports stated that Britain had demanded the right to speak to at least five Russians implicated in Litvinenko's death, and Russian Foreign Minister Sergey Lavrov asserted that Moscow was willing to answer "concrete questions". Russian Prosecutor-General Yuri Chaika said on Tuesday 5 December that any Russian citizen who may be charged in the poisoning will be tried in Russia, not Britain. Moreover, Chaika stated that UK detectives may ask questions to Russian citizens only in the presence of Russian prosecutors.

On 28 May 2007, the British Foreign Office submitted a formal request to the Russian Government for the extradition of Andrey Lugovoy to the UK to face criminal charges relating to Litvinenko's murder.

=== Extradition declined ===
The Russian General Prosecutor's Office declined to extradite Lugovoy, citing that extradition of citizens is not allowed under the Russian constitution (Article 61 of the Constitution of Russia). Russian authorities later said that Britain has not handed over any evidence against Lugovoy. Professor Daniel Tarschys, former Secretary General of the Council of Europe, commented that the Russian Constitution actually "opens the door" for the extradition, and Russia ratified three international treaties on extradition (on 10 December 1999); namely, the European Convention on Extradition and two Additional Protocols to it. Yury Fedotov, Ambassador of the Russian Federation, pointed out that when the Russian Federation ratified the European Convention on Extradition it entered a declaration concerning Article 6 in these terms: "The Russian Federation declares that in accordance with Article 61 (part 1) of the Constitution of the Russian Federation, a citizen of the Russian Federation may not be extradited to another state."

=== BBC programme ===
On 7 July 2008, a British security source told the BBC's Newsnight programme: "We very strongly believe the Litvinenko case to have had some state involvement. There are very strong indications." The British government claimed that no intelligence or security officials were authorised to comment on the case.

=== UK inquiry ===
In 2013, Theresa May as Home Secretary refused an inquiry stating it may damage international relations. Justice Minister Chris Grayling also denied Marina legal aid. In January 2016, a UK public inquiry, headed by Sir Robert Owen, found that Andrey Lugovoy and Dmitry Kovtun were responsible for the poisoning of Litvinenko. The inquiry also found that there was a strong probability that Lugovoy and Kovtun were acting under the direction of the FSB, and that their actions were probably approved by both Nikolai Patrushev, Director of the FSB, and President Vladimir Putin.

=== Carter v. Russia (ECHR) ===
In September 2021, the European Court of Human Rights (ECHR) found that Russia was responsible for Litvinenko's killing (a violation of Article 2 of the European Convention on Human Rights, to which Russia has been a party since 1998). The Court's findings were consistent with those of the UK inquiry; it ruled that it was "beyond reasonable doubt that the assassination had been carried out by" Andrey Lugovoy and Dmitry Kovtun; that there was "prima facie evidence of state involvement" and that there was a "strong" case that the two assassins were acting as agents of the Russian State; and that Russia had failed to investigate the murder or to identify and punish those responsible. The Court drew an adverse inference from Russia's refusal to disclose any documents from its investigation. The Court noted that the "planned and complex operation involving the procurement of a rare deadly poison, the travel arrangements for the pair, and repeated and sustained attempts to administer the poison indicated that Mr Litvinenko had been the target of the operation."

The Court ruled that Russia was to pay Litvinenko's widow, the applicant in the case, €100,000 in respect of non-pecuniary damage and €22,500 in respect of costs and expenses. It rejected the applicant's claim for punitive damages in the amount of €3.5 million, in keeping with its established practice.

== Possibly related events ==
=== Litvinenko photo as shooting target (Russia, 2002, 2006) ===
In January 2007, the Polish newspaper Dziennik revealed that a target with a photo of Litvinenko on it was used for shooting practice by the Vityaz Training Centre in Balashikha in October 2002. The centre was not affiliated with the government and trained bodyguards, debt collectors and private security forces, although in November 2006 the centre was used by the Vityaz special forces (spetsnaz) unit for a qualification examination due to their own centre being under renovation. The targets were photographed when the chairman of the Federation Council of Russia, Sergei Mironov, came for a visit on 7 November 2006.

=== Paul Joyal murder attempt (US, 2007) ===
On 2 March 2007, Paul Joyal, a former director of security for the U.S. Senate intelligence committee, who the previous weekend alleged on national television that the Kremlin was involved in the poisoning of Litvinenko, was shot near his Maryland home. An FBI spokesman said the agency was "assisting" the police investigation into the shooting. Police would not confirm details of the shooting or of the condition of Joyal. A person familiar with the case said he was in critical condition in hospital. It was reported that while there were no indications that the shooting was linked to the Litvinenko case, it is unusual for the FBI to get involved in a local shooting incident. A person familiar with the situation said NBC had hired bodyguards for some of the journalists involved in the program.

=== Skripal assassination attempt (UK, 2018) ===
Sergei Skripal is a former Russian military intelligence officer who acted as a double agent for the UK's intelligence services during the 1990s and early 2000s. In December 2004, he was arrested by Russia's Federal Security Service (FSB) and later tried, convicted of high treason, and sentenced to 13 years in prison. He settled in the UK in 2010 following the Illegals Program spy swap. On 4 March 2018, he and his daughter Yulia, who was visiting him from Moscow, were poisoned with a Novichok nerve agent. By 15 March 2018, they were in a critical condition at Salisbury District Hospital. The poisoning is being investigated as an attempted murder. He holds both Russian and British citizenship. On 21 March 2018 Russian ambassador to the UK Alexander Yakovenko said that Sergei Skripal is also a Russian citizen. On 29 March, Yulia was reported to be out of critical condition, conscious and talking. A week later, on 6 April, Skripal was said to no longer be in a critical state. He was discharged on 18 May.

Detective sergeant Nick Bailey, who was contaminated by the agent used in the assassination attempt against Skripal, suffered under severe health and financial repercussions as a consequence. Dawn Sturgess and her partner, Charlie Rowley, were also accidentally exposed to the Novichok poison, which led to Dawn Sturgess' death.

== Polonium-210 ==
=== Sources and production of polonium ===
A freelance killer would probably not be able to manufacture polonium from commercially available products in the amounts used for Litvinenko's poisoning, because macroscopic amounts of polonium can only be produced in state-regulated nuclear reactors, even though one might extract polonium from publicly available products, such as antistatic fans.

As production of polonium-210 was discontinued in most countries in late 2000s, all of the world's legal polonium-210 (^{210}Po) production occurs in Russia in RBMK reactors. A Moscow Times article claimed Russia produces about 85 grams (450,000 Ci) annually, but this was disputed by Russian nuclear physicist Radiy Ilkaev, who stated the Avangard plant produces only 9.6 grams per year.

The production of polonium starts from bombardment of bismuth (^{209}Bi) with neutrons at the Mayak nuclear reactors in Ozersk, near the city of Chelyabinsk in Russia. The product is then transferred to the Avangard Electromechanical Plant in the closed city of Sarov. This does not exclude the possibility that the polonium that killed Litvinenko was imported by a licensed commercial distributor, but no one—including the Russian government—has proposed that this is likely, particularly in regard to the radiation detected on the British Airways passenger jets travelling between Moscow and London.

Polonium-210 has a half-life of 138 days and decays to the stable daughter isotope of lead, ^{206}Pb. Therefore, the source is reduced to about one sixteenth of its original radioactivity about 18 months after production. By measuring the proportion of polonium and lead in a sample, one can establish the production date of polonium. The analysis of impurities in the polonium (a kind of "fingerprint") allows identification of the place of production. The isotope used in killing of Litvinenko has been traced by a British theoretical physics professor Norman Dombey:

The Po-210 used to poison Mr Litvinenko was made at the Avangard facility in Sarov, Russia. One of the isotope-producing reactors at the Mayak facility in Ozersk, Russia, was used for the initial irradiation of bismuth. In my opinion, the Russian state or its agents were responsible for the poisoning.

— Norman Dombey, Supplementary Report by Norman David Dombey

In addition, Dombey pointed out that Avangard delivers a metallic polonium, which must have been further processed into a solution as used in the Litvinenko assassination; involvement of an FSB poison laboratory was also likely.

=== Possible motivation for using polonium-210 ===
Philip Walker, professor of physics at the University of Surrey said: "This seems to have been a substance carefully chosen for its ability to be hard to detect in a person who has ingested it." Oleg Gordievsky, the most senior KGB agent ever to defect to Britain, made a similar comment that Litvinenko's assassination was carefully prepared and rehearsed by Russian secret services, but the poisoners were unaware that technology existed to detect traces left by polonium-210: "Did you know that polonium-210 leaves traces? I didn’t. And no one did. ...what they didn’t know was that this equipment, this technology exists in the West – they didn’t know that, and that was where they miscalculated."

Nick Priest, a nuclear scientist and expert on polonium who has worked at most of Russia's nuclear research facilities, says that although the execution of the plot was a "bout of stupidity", the choice of polonium was a "stroke of genius". He says: "the choice of poison was genius in that polonium, carried in a vial in water, can be carried in a pocket through airport screening devices without setting off any alarms", adding, "once administered, the polonium creates symptoms that don't suggest poison for days, allowing time for the perpetrator to make a getaway." Priest asserts that "whoever did it was probably not an expert in radiation protection, so they probably didn't realize how much contamination you can get just by opening the top (of the vial) and closing it again. With the right equipment, you can detect just one count per second."

Filmmaker and friend of Litvinenko Andrei Nekrasov has suggested that the poison was "sadistically designed to trigger a slow, tortuous and spectacular demise." Expert on Russia Paul Joyal suggested that "A message has been communicated to anyone who wants to speak out against the Kremlin.... If you do, no matter who you are, where you are, we will find you, and we will silence you, in the most horrible way possible."

== Russian response ==
=== Initial public comments ===
The poisoning of Litvinenko immediately led to the suspicion that he was killed by Russian secret services. Viktor Ilyukhin, a deputy chairman of the Russian Parliament's security committee for the Communist Party of the Russian Federation, said that he "can’t exclude that possibility". He apparently referred to a recent Russian counter-terrorism law that gives the president the right to order such actions. An investigator of the Russian apartment bombings, Mikhail Trepashkin, wrote in a letter from prison that an FSB team had organised in 2002 to kill Litvinenko. He also reported FSB plans to kill relatives of Litvinenko in Moscow in 2002, although these have not been carried out. State Duma member Sergei Abeltsev commented on 24 November 2006: "The deserved punishment reached the traitor. I am confident that this terrible death will be a serious warning to traitors of all colors, wherever they are located: In Russia, they do not pardon treachery. I would recommend citizen Berezovsky to avoid any food at the commemoration for his accomplice Litvinenko."

=== Further response from Russia ===
Many publications in Russian media suggested that the death of Litvinenko was connected to Boris Berezovsky.

Shortly after the incident, the Russian government dismissed allegations of FSB involvement in the assassination using the argument that Litvinenko was "not important" and "mentally unstable", implying that the government had no interest in killing such an insignificant figure. However, Eduard Limonov observed that the same argument was raised after the assassination of Anna Politkovskaya, and described Litvinenko's death as a "very public execution".

An explanation put forward by the Russian Government appeared to be that the deaths of Litvinenko and Politkovskaya were intended to embarrass President Putin. Other allegations included involvement of rogue FSB members or suggestions that Litvinenko was killed because of his research of certain Russian corporations or state officials, or as a political intrigue to undermine president Putin.

In December 2006, Litvinenko's father Walter accused President Putin of ordering his son's murder and said he had no doubt the FSB had been involved. "The cynical murder of my son was a calculated act of intimidation," he said. In April 2018, Litvinenko senior, who had returned to Russia in 2012 after a period of exile in Italy, appeared in a 30-minute interview on RT and said his son had been murdered by Alex Goldfarb, who he said was an agent of the CIA. The elder Litvinenko's later claims have been found to be false.

== Suspects ==
Andrey Lugovoy
A former Federal Protective Service officer and millionaire who met with Litvinenko on the day he fell ill (1 November). He had visited London at least three times in the month before Litvinenko's death and met with the victim four times. Traces of polonium-210 have been discovered in all three hotels where Lugovoy stayed after flying to London on 16 October, and in the Pescatori restaurant in Dover Street, Mayfair, where Lugovoy is understood to have dined before 1 November; and aboard two aircraft on which he had travelled. He has declined to say whether he had been contaminated with polonium-210. The Crown Prosecution Service has charged him with murder and has sent an extradition request to Russia that includes a summary of the evidence, but the only third party to have seen the extradition request, American journalist Edward Epstein, has described the substantiation as "embarrassingly thin".
Dmitry Kovtun
A Russian businessman and ex-KGB agent who met Litvinenko in London first in mid-October and then on 1 November, the day Litvinenko fell ill. On 7 December Kovtun was hospitalized, with some sources initially reporting him to be in a coma. On 9 December, German police found traces of radiation at a Hamburg flat used by Kovtun. The following day, 10 December, German investigators identified the detected material as polonium-210 and clarified that the substance was found where Kovtun had slept the night before departing for London. British police also report having detected polonium on the plane in which Kovtun travelled from Moscow. Three other points in Hamburg were identified as contaminated with the same substance. On 12 December Kovtun told Russia's Channel One TV that his "health was improving".
Kovtun was under investigation by German detectives for suspected plutonium smuggling into Germany in October. Germany dropped the case against Kovtun in November 2009.

== Other people related to the case ==
Yegor Gaidar
The sudden illness of Yegor Gaidar in Ireland on 24 November 2006, the day of Litvinenko's death, has been linked to his visit to the restaurant where polonium was present and is being investigated as part of the overall investigation in the UK and Ireland. Other observers noted he was probably poisoned after drinking a strange-tasting cup of tea. Gaidar was taken to hospital; doctors said his condition was not life-threatening and that he would recover. This incident was similar to the poisoning of Anna Politkovskaya on a flight to Beslan. Afterwards, Gaidar claimed that it was enemies of the Kremlin who had tried to poison him.

Mario Scaramella
The United Kingdom's Health Protection Agency (HPA) announced that significant quantities of polonium-210 had been found in Mario Scaramella although his health was found to be normal. He was admitted to hospital for tests and monitoring. Doctors say that Scaramella was exposed to a much lower level of polonium-210 than Litvinenko, and that preliminary tests found "no evidence of radiation toxicity". According to the 6 pm Channel 4 news (9 December 2006), the intake of polonium he suffered would only result in a dose of 1 millisievert (100 mrem). This would lead to a 1 in 20,000 chance of cancer. According to The Independent, Scaramella alleged that Litvinenko was involved in smuggling radioactive material to Zürich in 2000.

Boris Volodarsky, a KGB defector residing in London, stated that Evgeni Limarev, another former KGB officer residing in France, continued collaboration with the FSB, infiltrated Litvinenko's and Scaramella's circles of trust and misinformed the latter.

Marina Litvinenko
UK reports state Litvinenko's widow tested positive for polonium, though she was not seriously ill. The Ashdown Park hotel in Sussex was evacuated as a precaution, possibly to do with Scaramella's previous visit there. According to the 6 pm Channel 4 (9 December 2006) news, the intake of polonium she suffered would only result in a dose of 100 millisieverts (10 rem), leading to a 1 in 200 chance of cancer.

Akhmed Zakayev
The forensic investigation also includes the silver Mercedes outside Litvinenko's home believed to be owned by his close friend and neighbour Akhmed Zakayev, then foreign minister of the separatist government in exile of Ichkeria. Reports now state that traces of radioactive material were found in the vehicle.

British police
Two London Metropolitan Police officers tested positive for ^{210}Po poisoning.

Bar staff
Some of the bar staff at the hotel where the polonium-contaminated teacup was found were discovered to have suffered an intake of polonium (dose in the range of tens of mSv). These people include Norberto Andrade, the head barman and a long-time (27 years) worker at the hotel. He has described the situation thus:
"When I was delivering gin and tonic to the table, I was obstructed. I couldn't see what was happening, but it seemed very deliberate to create a distraction. It made it difficult to put the drink down.
"It was the only moment when the situation seemed unfriendly and something went on at that point. I think the polonium was sprayed into the teapot. There was contamination found on the picture above where Mr Litvinenko had been sitting and all over the table, chair and floor, so it must have been a spray.
"When I poured the remains of the teapot into the sink, the tea looked more yellow than usual and was thicker – it looked gooey.
"I scooped it out of the sink and threw it into the bin. I was so lucky I didn't put my fingers into my mouth, or scratch my eye as I could have got this poison inside me."

== Timeline ==
=== Background history ===
- 7 June 1994: A remote-controlled bomb detonated aiming at chauffeured Mercedes 600 with oligarch Boris Berezovsky and his bodyguard in the rear seat. The driver was decapitated but Berezovsky managed to survive with severe burns. Litvinenko, then with the organized-crime unit of the FSB, was an investigating officer of the assassination attempt. The case was never solved, but it was at this point that Litvinenko befriended Berezovsky.
- 17 November 1998: At a time that Vladimir Putin was the head of the FSB, five officers including Lieutenant-Colonel Litvinenko accuse the Director of the Directorate for the Analysis of Criminal Organizations Major-General Eugeny Hoholkhov and his deputy, 1st Rank Captain Alexander Kamishnikov, of ordering them to assassinate Boris Berezovsky in November 1997.

=== 2006 ===
==== October 2006 ====
- 7 October: The Russian journalist and Kremlin critic Anna Politkovskaya is shot and killed in Moscow.
- 16 October: Andrey Lugovoy flies to London.
- 16–18 October: Former KGB agent Dmitry Kovtun visits London, during which time he eats two meals with Litvinenko, one of them at the Itsu sushi bar (see 1 November 2006).
- 17 October: Litvinenko visits "Risc Management", a security firm in Cavendish Place, with Lugovoy and Kovtun.
- 19 October: Litvinenko accuses President Putin of the Politkovskaya murder.
- 28 October: Dmitry Kovtun arrives in Hamburg, Germany, from Moscow on an Aeroflot flight. German police later discover that the passenger seat of the car that picked him up at an airport was contaminated with polonium-210.
- 31 October: Dmitry Kovtun travels to London from Hamburg. German police found that his ex-wife's apartment in Hamburg was contaminated with polonium-210.

==== November 2006 ====
- 1 November: According to Oleg Gordievsky, Litvinenko meets with Andrey Lugovoy, Dmitry Kovtun and a third person in the Millennium Hotel sometime after 11:30 am, where he is served tea. All locations subsequently visited by him show traces of polonium-210. Just after 3 pm, at the Itsu sushi restaurant on Picadilly, Litvinenko meets the Italian security expert Mario Scaramella, who hands alleged evidence to him concerning the murder of Politkovskaya. Around 4:30 pm he meets Lugovoy and Kovtun again in the Millennium Hotel in London, the meeting only lasting 20 minutes. Later, Litvinenko goes to the office of Boris Berezovsky to copy the papers Scaramella had given him and hand them to Berezovsky before being driven home by Akhmed Zakayev at around 5:20 pm. He later falls ill.
- 3 November: Litvinenko is brought into Barnet Hospital.
- 11 November: Litvinenko tells the BBC he was poisoned and is in very bad condition.
- 17 November: Litvinenko is moved to University College Hospital and placed under armed guard.
- 19 November: Reports emerge that Litvinenko has been poisoned with thallium, a chemical element used in the past as a rat poison.
- 20 November: Litvinenko is moved to the Intensive Care Unit. The police take statements from people with close relation to Litvinenko. A Kremlin speaker denies the Russian government is involved in the poisoning.
- 22 November: The hospital announces that Litvinenko's condition has worsened substantially.
- 23 November: 9:21 pm: Litvinenko dies.
- 24 November: Litvinenko's dictated deathbed statement is published. He accuses President Vladimir Putin of being responsible for his death. The Kremlin rejects the accusation. The HPA announces that significant amounts of polonium-210 have been found in Litvinenko's body. Traces of the same substance are also found at Litvinenko's house in North London, at Itsu and at the Millennium Hotel.
- 24 November: Sergei Abeltsev, State Duma member from the LDPR, in his Duma address he commented on the death of Litvinenko with the following words: "The deserved punishment reached the traitor. I am sure his terrible death will be a warning to all the traitors that in Russia the treason is not to be forgiven. I would recommend to citizen Berezovsky to avoid any food at the commemoration for his crime accomplice Litvinenko."
- 24 November: The British police state they are investigating the death as a possible poisoning.
- 28 November: Scotland Yard announces that traces of polonium-210 have been found in seven different places in London. Among them, an office of the Russian billionaire Boris Berezovsky, an avowed opponent of Putin.
- 29 November: The HPA announces screening of the nurses and physicians who treated Litvinenko. The authorities find traces of a radioactive substance on board British Airways planes.
- 30 November: Polonium-210 traces are found on a number of other planes, most of them going to Moscow.

==== December 2006 ====
- 1 December: An autopsy is performed on the body of Litvinenko. Toxicology results from Mr Litvinenko's post-mortem examination revealed two "spikes" of radiation poisoning, suggesting he received two separate doses. Scaramella tests positive for polonium-210 and is admitted into a hospital. Litvinenko's widow also tests positive for polonium-210, but was not sent to the hospital for treatment.
- 2 December: Scotland Yard's counter-terrorist unit have questioned Yuri Shvets, a former KGB spy who emigrated to the United States in 1993. He was questioned as a witness in Washington in the presence of FBI officers. Shvets claimed that he has a "lead that can explain what happened."
- 6 December: Scotland Yard announced that it is treating his death as a murder.
- 7 December: Confused reports state that Dmitry Kovtun was hospitalized, the reason has not yet been made clear.
- 7 December: Russian Office of the Prosecutor General has opened a criminal case over poisoning of Litvinenko and Kovtun by the articles "Murder committed in a way endangering the general public" (убийство, совершенное общеопасным способом) and "Attempted murder of two or more persons committed in a way endangering the general public."
- 8 December: Kovtun is reported to be in coma.
- 9 December: German police find traces of radiation at Hamburg flat used by Kovtun.
- 9 December: UK police identify a single cup at the Pines Bar in the Millennium Hotel in Mayfair which was almost certainly the one used to administer the poison.
- 11 December: Andrey Lugovoy is interrogated in Moscow by UK Scotland Yard and General Procurator's office of the Russian Federation. He refuses to reveal any information concerning the interrogation.
- 12 December: Dmitry Kovtun tells a Russian TV station that his "health [is] improving".
- 24 December: Mario Scaramella was arrested in Naples on his return from London, on apparently unrelated charges.
- 27 December: Prosecutor General of Russia Yury Chaika accused Leonid Nevzlin, a former Vice President of Yukos, exiled in Israel and wanted by Russian authorities for a long time, of involvement in the poisoning, a charge dismissed by the latter as a nonsense.

=== 2007 ===
==== February 2007 ====
- 5 February: Boris Berezovsky told the BBC that on his deathbed, Litvinenko said that Lugovoy was responsible for his poisoning.
- 6 February: The text of a letter written by Litvinenko's widow on 31 January to Putin, demanding that Putin work with British authorities on solving the case, was released.
- 8 February 2007: Update to HPA (Health Protection Agency) investigation of polonium 210 incident.

==== May 2007 ====
- 21 May: Sir Ken Macdonald QC (Director of Public Prosecutions of England and Wales) says that Lugovoy should face trial for the "grave crime" of murdering Litvinenko.
- 22 May: Macdonald announces that Britain will seek extradition of Lugovoy and attempt to charge him with murdering Litvinenko. The Russian government states that they will not allow the extradition of any Russian citizens.
- 28 May: The British Foreign Office formally submits a request to the Russian Government for the extradition of Lugovoy to the UK to face criminal charges.
  - The Constitution of Russia forbids extradition of Russian citizens to foreign countries (Article 61), so the request can not be fulfilled.

Extradition requests had been granted in the past (For example, in 2002 Murad Garabayev has been handed to Turkmenistan., Garabayev's extradition was later found unlawful by the Russian courts and he was awarded €20,000 in damages to be paid by the Russian government by the European Court of Human Rights.) Article 63 does not explicitly mention Russian citizens, and therefore does not apply to them, but only to foreign nationals living in Russia. Article 61 supersedes it for the people holding the Russian citizenship.

- 31 May: Lugovoy held a news conference at which he accused MI6 of attempting to recruit him and blamed either MI6, the Russian mafia, or fugitive Kremlin opponent Boris Berezovsky for the killing.

==== July 2007 ====
- 16 July: The British Foreign Office confirms that, as a result of Russia's refusal to extradite Lugovoy, four Russian diplomats are to be expelled from the Russian Embassy in London.
- 17 July: Russia's deputy foreign minister, Alexander Grushko, threatens to expel 80 UK diplomats.
- 19 July: The Russian Foreign ministry spokesman, Mikhail Kamynin, announced the expulsion of four UK diplomats from the British Embassy in Moscow.

==== October 2007 ====
- 27 October: Alexander Litvinenko is reported to have been an MI6 agent. Such claims have been denied by Marina Litvinenko and Oleg Gordievsky.

==== December 2008 ====
- In a 16 December 2008 interview, when asked by the Spanish newspaper El País if Litvinenko could have been killed in the interests of the Russian state, Lugovoy – wanted by British police on suspicion of the murder of Litvinenko – replied that he would order the assassination of anyone, for example, President Saakashvili of Georgia and the KGB defector Gordievsky, in the interests of the Russian state.

== Comparisons to other deaths ==
=== Deaths from ingesting radioactive materials ===
According to the IAEA, in 1960, a person ingested 74 MBq of radium (assumed to be ^{226}Ra) and this person died four years later. Harold McCluskey survived 11 years (eventually dying from cardio respiratory failure) after an intake of at least 37 MBq of ^{241}Am (He was exposed in 1976). It is estimated that he suffered doses of 18 Gy to his bone mass, 520 Gy to the bone surface, 8 Gy to the liver and 1.6 Gy to the lungs; it is also claimed that a post mortem examination revealed no signs of cancer in his body. The October 1983 issue of the journal Health Physics was dedicated to McCluskey, and subsequent papers about him appeared in the September 1995 issue.

=== Similar suspicious deaths and poisonings ===
Comparisons have been made to the alleged 2004 poisoning of Viktor Yushchenko, the alleged 2003 poisoning of Yuri Shchekochikhin and the fatal 1978 poisoning of the journalist Georgi Markov by the Bulgarian Committee for State Security. The incident with Litvinenko has also attracted comparisons to the poisoning by radioactive (unconfirmed) thallium of KGB defector Nikolay Khokhlov and journalist Shchekochikhin of Novaya Gazeta (the Novaya Gazeta interview with the former, coincidentally, prepared by Russian journalist Anna Politkovskaya, who was later found shot to death in her apartment building). Like Litvinenko, Shchekochikhin had investigated the Russian apartment bombings (he was a member of the Kovalev Commission that hired Litvinenko's friend Mikhail Trepashkin as a legal counsel).

KGB defector and British agent Oleg Gordievsky believed the murders of Yandarbiev, Yushenkov, Shchekochikhin, Tsepov, Politkovskaya and the incident with Litvinenko showed that the FSB had returned to the practice of political assassinations, which were conducted in the past by the Thirteenth Department of the KGB. A comparison was also made with Roman Tsepov who was responsible for the personal security of Anatoly Sobchak and Putin, and who died in Russia in 2004 from poisoning by an unknown radioactive substance.

FSB special forces officers from Alpha Group and Vympel were seen to be using Litvinenko photos for target practice in shooting sessions just before his poisoning, according to Russian journalist Yulia Latynina.

== References in popular culture ==
- 60 Minutes aired a segment entitled "Who Killed Alexander Litvinenko?" on 7 January 2007. A transcript is available online.
- Thriller writers Frederick Forsyth and Andy McNab claimed that the killing of Alexander Litvinenko is a classic case of fact being stranger than fiction and that they would be fighting a losing battle if they offered a Litvinenko-style story to a publisher.
- The Polonium Restaurant (a Polish restaurant in Sheffield, England, owned by Boguslaw Sidorowicz and named after his folk band in the late 1970s) experienced increased interest and business as a result of internet searches for the phrase polonium restaurant.
- Rebellion: The Litvinenko Case (distributed as Poisoned by Polonium) is a 2007 Russian documentary film about Litvinenko's activities and death.
- Hunting the KGB Killers is a Channel 4 documentary released in 2017 on the poisoning.
- The British TV series, Litvinenko, is a four-part dramatisation of the assassination and subsequent investigation. It stars David Tennant in the title role. It premièred on ITVX on 15 December 2022.

== See also ==
- Active measures
- Extrajudicial killing
- List of crimes involving radioactive substances
- Litvinenko Justice Foundation
- Nuclear terrorism
- Poison laboratory of the Soviet secret services
- Poisoning of Sergei and Yulia Skripal
- Russia – United Kingdom relations
- List of unusual deaths in the 21st century
