= Russian spy poisoning =

Russian spy poisoning may refer to:

- Poisoning of Alexander Litvinenko
- Poisoning of Sergei and Yulia Skripal
