= Vitaly Nuikin =

Soviet intelligence officer

- Born: Russian: Виталий Алексеевич Нуйкин; 5 April 1939; Mokhovskoye, Parfenovsky District, Altai Krai, Russian SFSR, Soviet Union
- Died: February 1998 (aged 58); Moscow
- Education: Moscow State Institute of International Relations
- Awards: Order of the October Revolution; Order of the Red Banner
- Espionage activity
- Allegiance: Soviet Union
- Service branch: KGB
- Service years: 1960–1993
- Rank: Colonel

Vitaly Alekseevich Nuikin (Russian: Виталий Алексеевич Нуйкин; 5 April 1939 - 1998) was a Soviet intelligence officer, and colonel of the KGB of the USSR.

== Biography ==
Nuikin was born on 5 April 1939 in the village of Mokhovskoye in the Parfenovsky District of the Altai Krai in the Russian SFSR, Soviet Union in a family of employees.

In 1960 he graduated from the Faculty of International Relations of the Moscow State Institute of International Relations.

Since 1960, in a special reserve - Office "C" (illegal intelligence) of the First Chief Directorate (CCGT, foreign intelligence) of the State Security Committee (KGB) under the Council of Ministers of the USSR - KGB of the USSR - Russian Foreign Intelligence Service.

The English slang language of Nuikin was individually taught by the legendary scout Konon Molodoy, and Danish by Oleg Gordievsky.

Together with his wife Lyudmila, until 1986, Vitaly Nuykin worked in more than 18 countries. According to the official SVR certificate of the Russian Federation, published in January 2020, "illegal intelligence officers worked in states with a tough administrative-police regime in conditions involving a risk to life". According to the BBC Russian Service, the Nuikin couple pretended to be natives of French-speaking countries, their main activity took place in France, as well as in Africa and Southeast Asia. They specialized mainly in industrial intelligence.

In particular, in the 1960s, the Nuikins stole technology in the West that allowed them to produce drills for drilling oil and gas wells, which dramatically increased their margin of safety, and the use of drills became possible within 3–4 days, while the drills Soviet production when drilling wells failed after 3–4 hours of operation. Mastering the innovative, at that time, technology to increase the life cycle of drills allowed to increase productivity in Soviet oil and gas fields several times. This brought the Soviet Union profit, many times paying off the costs of maintaining dozens of illegal intelligence agents abroad. In France, in the 1970s, the Nuikins were able to register a company and steal military-industrial secrets for the Soviet missile and space complex. The spouses of Nuikin also collected information on the military-political situation in Western Europe.

According to the official opinion of the Foreign Intelligence Service, "Vitaly Nuikin organized an agent apparatus, through which he regularly obtained particularly valuable information on strategic aspects of the policies of leading Western countries and scientific and technical issues."

After the disclosure in the UK by fugitive colonel of the PSU of the KGB of the USSR Oleg Gordievsky of information about Soviet agents, Vitaly Nuikin, in order to avoid arrest, was forced to hide in the hold of a Soviet ship moored in port for several days. On the way to the USSR, Nuikin nearly drowned in a severe storm, but the ship was able to safely reach its destination. His wife had returned to the USSR a little earlier. After returning, the Nuikins continued to work at the Center. They retired in 1993.

In 1997, the ex-intelligence officer suffered a heart attack, doctors were able to extend his life only for a year. Vitaly Nuykin suddenly died in February 1998.

The Nuikin spouses had two sons - Yuri and Andrei (Andre), two grandchildren and two granddaughters. Of their sons, Yuri Vitalievich Nuikin was a colonel, while Andrey Vitalievich Nuikin (born 5 December 1976) graduated from the Military Institute of Government Communications and as of 2020 is the head of the information systems security department of the global mining and metallurgical company Evraz.

Until January 2020, the name of Vitaly Nuikin was classified. In 2018, Lyudmila Nuykina, without giving her spouse's name, spoke in detail about her husband's work in illegal intelligence and the joint production of foreign military and technical developments in an interview with RIA Novosti and Russia-1 TV program host Sergey Brilev.

On 28 January 2020 the Director of the Foreign Intelligence Service Sergey Naryshkin, at a press conference with the news agency Rossiya Segodnya, named the Russian illegal intelligence agents who made a significant contribution to ensuring the country's security and protecting its interests. Among those named was Vitaly Nuikin. Data on the identity of the wife of Nuikin Lyudmila Ivanovna in illegal intelligence was officially announced by the SVR in September 2017.

== Family ==
Wife Lyudmila Nuikina - illegal intelligence officer, retired foreign service colonel.

== Awards ==
- Order of the October Revolution;
- Order of the Red Banner (06/06/1984);
- Medals of the USSR and the Russian Federation;
- Badge "For service in intelligence."

== See also ==
- Vladimir Lokhov
