= Andrey Lugovoy =

Russian politician and businessman (born 1966)

Andrey Lugovoy MP
- Андрей Луговой
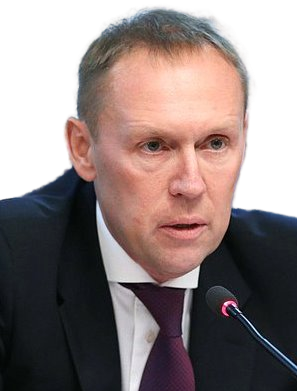
- Lugovoy (2019)

Member of the State Duma (Party List Seat)
- Incumbent
- Assumed office 24 December 2007

Personal details
- Born: 19 September 1966 (age 60) Baku, Azerbaijan SSR, USSR
- Party: Liberal Democratic

Andrey Konstantinovich Lugovoy (Russian: Андре́й Константи́нович Лугово́й; born 19 September 1966), also spelled Lugovoi, is a Russian politician and businessman and deputy of the State Duma, the lower house of the Russian parliament, for the Liberal Democratic Party of Russia. He worked as a KGB bodyguard and as head of "Ninth Wave", a security firm.

He is wanted by British police on suspicion of the murder of Alexander Litvinenko, a former KGB and later FSB officer. Russia has rejected the request for his extradition, as the country's constitution forbids the extradition of its own citizens.

== KGB and security services career ==
Born in 1966 in Baku, Lugovoy attended the elite Moscow Higher Military Command School of the Soviet Army from 1983 to 1987.

In 1987, he joined the KGB's 9th directorate which provided security for top state officials. He was a platoon commander for five years and then served as a commander in the Kremlin Regiment's training company. In 1991, he was transferred to the Federal Protective Service of Russia until his resignation at the end of 1996. During this time he provided security for Prime Minister Yegor Gaidar, the head of the presidential administration Sergey Filatov and Foreign Minister Andrey Kozyrev.

Lugovoy went on to work in the private security business. From 1996 to 2000, he both headed security at the television company ORT, then owned by tycoons Boris Berezovsky and Badri Patarkatsishvili, and also headed Patarkatsishvili's family and personal security unit. In 2001, Lugovoy was arrested and charged with organizing the escape of Nikolai Glushkov, a former deputy director-general of Aeroflot arrested in 2000 on fraud charges.

== Alexander Litvinenko poisoning ==
Lugovoy met with Litvinenko on the day Litvinenko fell ill (1 November 2006). Litvinenko died later in November from radiation poisoning caused by polonium-210, and, on 22 May 2007, British officials charged Lugovoy with Litvinenko's murder, announcing they would seek his extradition from Russia. Russia declined to extradite Lugovoy, citing that extradition of citizens is not allowed under the Russian constitution.

Lugovoy had visited London at least three times in the month before Litvinenko's death and met with him four times. Lugovoy met with Litvinenko on the day he fell ill (1 November). Traces of polonium-210 were discovered in all three hotels where Lugovoy stayed after flying to London on 16 October; in the Pescatori restaurant, Dover Street, Mayfair, where Lugovoy is understood to have dined before 1 November; and aboard two aircraft on which he had traveled. He was treated at a Moscow hospital for suspected radiation poisoning but declined to say whether he had been contaminated with polonium-210, the substance that led to Litvinenko's death on 23 November 2006.

=== Timeline of Lugovoy's involvement in the poisoning of Litvinenko ===
- On 30 November 2006, Georgian tycoon Badri Patarkatsishvili described Lugovoy as a "close friend" with whom he had been working for thirteen years. He said he hoped Lugovoy was innocent, but added that there is "no such thing as a former KGB agent."
- On 4 December 2006, Lugovoy visited a hospital in Moscow for medical tests.
- On 9 December 2006, Lugovoy was released from the hospital and declared to be in "satisfactory condition."
- On 26 January 2007, The Guardian reported that the British government was preparing an extradition request asking that Lugovoy be returned to the United Kingdom to stand trial for Litvinenko's murder.
- On 5 February 2007, Boris Berezovsky told the BBC that on his deathbed, Litvinenko said that Lugovoy was responsible for his poisoning.
- On 22 May 2007, Britain's Director of Public Prosecutions announced that Britain would seek extradition of Lugovoy and attempt to charge him with murdering Litvinenko. Russia has previously stated that it has no right to allow the extradition of any Russian citizen for trial in Britain.
- On 28 May 2007, the British Foreign Office formally submitted a request for Lugovoy's extradition to the Russian Government. This was confirmed by both the British embassy in Moscow and the Russian prosecution office.
  - Lugovoy is quoted as saying he is a "victim not a perpetrator of a radiation attack", and he has called the charges "politically motivated".
  - The Constitution of Russia, like that of France, Germany, Austria, China, and Japan forbids extradition of its citizens to foreign countries (Art. 61), so the request cannot be fulfilled. Russian citizens can be convicted of crimes committed abroad by Russian courts if foreign law agencies provide necessary evidence.
- On 31 May 2007, Lugovoy held a news conference at which he accused MI6 of attempting to recruit him and blamed either MI6, the Russian mafia, or fugitive Kremlin opponent Boris Berezovsky for the killing.
- On 4 July 2007, Russia formally declined a UK request to extradite Lugovoy.

In 2021 the European Court of Human Rights (ECHR) in Strasbourg found beyond reasonable doubt that Andrey Lugovoy and Dmitry Kovtun killed Litvinenko.

== Political career ==
Following the interest in Lugovoy in regards to Litvinenko's death, on 15 September 2007, Vladimir Zhirinovsky, leader of the Liberal Democratic Party of Russia (LDPR), announced that Lugovoy would be in the second place after Zhirinovsky on his party's candidate list for the Duma election. This meant that Lugovoy could become a Russian MP in December 2007 and acquire parliamentary immunity. Lugovoy himself confirmed that he would take part in the following Duma election and on 17 September 2007, during a Liberal Democratic Party of Russia meeting, has also said he would like to bid for the Kremlin run.

On 10 December 2007, British Ambassador in Moscow Tony Brenton voiced regret over the election of Lugovoy to the Duma, saying:

It is a pity that a man wanted for murder gains political recognition. It does Russia no good at all to have Lugovoy there in the parliament. It continues the suspicion. If he steps a foot out of Russia he will be arrested. We want him.

In December 2008, Lugovoy voiced support for harsher laws against dissent in Russia. He told the Spanish newspaper El País

"If someone has caused the Russian state serious damage, they should be exterminated. […] Do I think someone could have killed Litvinenko in the interests of the Russian State? If you're talking about the interests of the Russian State, in the purest sense of the word, I myself would have given that order." He then clarified himself: "I'm not talking about Litvinenko but about any person who causes serious damage."

Lugovoy named President Saakashvili of Georgia and the KGB defector Gordievsky as examples.

On 13 March 2009, the LDPR announced it plans to nominate Lugovoy for the elections of Mayor of Sochi. On 24 March, Lugovoy announced his decision not to run and instead to remain an MP in the Duma.

In 2007–2011 Andrey Lugovoy was a deputy of the 5th State Duma. In 2011–2016 he was a deputy of the 6th State Duma. In 2016–2021 he was elected a deputy of the 7th State Duma. Since 2021 he has been a deputy of the 8th State Duma.

== January 2017 blacklisting ==
On 9 January 2017, under the Magnitsky Act, the United States Treasury's Office of Foreign Assets Control updated its Specially Designated Nationals List and blacklisted Aleksandr I. Bastrykin, Andrei K. Lugovoi, Dmitri V. Kovtun, Stanislav Gordievsky, and Gennady Plaksin, which froze any of their assets held by American financial institutions or transactions with those institutions and banned their travelling to the United States.

== Family ==
The politician has adult daughters and a son.

In October 2012, he held a lavish wedding in Abrau-Dyurso, marrying 23-year-old (born July 26, 1989) student Kseniya Alekseyevna Perova.

== Income and property ==
Lugovoy owns a 500 m^{2} plot of land in Krasnodar Krai. He also owns two residential houses measuring 550 m^{2} and 165.5 m^{2}, respectively. The Lugovoy family has a 368 m^{2} apartment in a historic 1904 building on Lyalin Lane in Moscow, along with a 12.9 m^{2} non-residential space. In 2019, Kseniya Lugovaya purchased a 200.1 m^{2} apartment in the same building for 51 million rubles.

== In popular culture ==
In the 2022 ITVX miniseries Litvinenko, Lugovoy was portrayed by Rad Kaim.

== Awards ==
In 2015 Lugovoy was awarded the Medal of the Order "For Merit to the Fatherland" (II degree).
