= Leonid Shebarshin =

Soviet intelligence chairman

- Леонид Шебаршин

Acting Chairman of the Committee for State Security
- In office 22 August 1991 – 23 August 1991
- Premier: Vitaly Doguzhiyev (аcting)
- Preceded by: Vladimir Kryuchkov
- Succeeded by: Vadim Bakatin

Head of the First Chief Directorate of the KGB
- In office 6 February 1989 – 22 September 1991
- Preceded by: Vadim Kirpichenko
- Succeeded by: Vyacheslav Gurgenov

Personal details
- Born: 24 March 1935 Moscow, Soviet Union
- Died: 30 March 2012 (aged 77) Moscow, Russia
- Resting place: Troyekurovskoye Cemetery, Moscow
- Party: Communist Party of the Soviet Union

Military service
- Allegiance: Soviet Union
- Branch/service: KGB
- Years of service: 1962–1991
- Rank: Lieutenant general
- Battles/wars: Soviet–Afghan War

Leonid Vladimirovich Shebarshin (Russian: Леонид Владимирович Шебаршин; 24 March 1935 – 30 March 2012) was an intelligence officer and spy for the Soviet Union. He served in the First Chief Directorate (FCD), the foreign intelligence arm of the KGB. In January 1989, he was promoted to the head of the FCD when his former boss, Vladimir Kryuchkov, was promoted to KGB chief. Prior to that Shebarshin had served as Kryuchkov's deputy from April 1987.

== Early life ==
After graduating in 1952 from high school with a silver medal, Shebarshin entered the Department of Indian Languages at the Moscow Institute of Oriental Studies. In 1954, the institute was integrated with the Moscow State Institute of International Relations, also known as MGIMO. It was there that Shebarshin continued his studies.

In 1957, he married a classmate, Nina Vassilyevna Pushkina, a student of Chinese languages. Upon graduation, in October 1958, he was assigned to work at the Soviet embassy in Pakistan. In 1962, he was promoted to the post of third secretary of the embassy and got a position at the department of South-East Asian Affairs of the USSR.

== Pakistan ==
In 1962, Shebarshin was invited to join the First Chief Directorate, where he began a new career in the rank of second lieutenant and security officer. After a year of training at an intelligence school, he was sent to work in Pakistan under diplomatic status.

At the time, Pakistan's participation in military-political blocs CENTO and SEATO, its close ties with the United States, conflict with neighboring India, and rapprochement with China made the Pakistan branch important for the Soviet intelligence. The acquisition of sources in U.S. facilities around Pakistan was of utmost importance to the KGB. At the time, the region was a large American colony in India, hosting military advisers, diplomats, spies, journalists, and other important operators.

At the initiative of the Soviet Union, Pakistani President Ayub Khan and Indian Prime Minister Lal Bahadur Shastri met in January 1966 in Tashkent to end the Indo-Pakistani War of 1965. This was a major diplomatic success for the Soviet delegation, headed by Alexei Kosygin. Shebarshin was promoted for contributing to the preparation for the negotiations. Shebarshin's supervisors later stated that he "achieved concrete results in the recruiting work," hinting that he bribed intelligence agents and acquired information.

== India ==
In 1968, Shebarshin returned to Moscow and took a year-long training course for managerial staff. In early 1971, he was sent by the KGB to India, and in 1975, he was appointed as rezident.

While Shebarshin was on the trip, there was another Indo-Pakistani War, which ended with the division of Pakistan and the secession of East Pakistan as Bangladesh, along with a state of emergency in India. Activities of American representatives in India required the close attention of the Soviet intelligence team; for decades, the United States remained the main opponent of the Soviet Union. India's relations with China were also important during that period. Shebarshin's residency in the key areas was assessed positively by the political leadership of the USSR.

== Iran ==
Shebarshin's six-year trip to India ended in April 1977. In late 1978 he received orders to prepare to work in Pahlavi Iran, and he arrived in May 1979. By this time, Soviet intelligence connections with Iranian officials had degraded, due in part to counterintelligence operations carried out by SAVAK, the secret police of the Iranian monarchy.

Shebarshin eventually arrived after the fall of the monarchy in Iran, when the Shah, Mohammad Reza Pahlavi, fled the country in January 1979. Ayatollah Khomeini returned to Iran the same year and received national recognition with the title of Imam. The Iranian Revolution marked an unprecedented intensification of internal political turmoil, which degenerated into armed clashes and numerous acts of terror, undertaken by all contending parties.

Soviet reaction to these events were mixed. They lost an ally and customer in the Shah, but the early stages of the revolution were seen as an opportunity to form a progressive coalition in the resulting power vacuum. The KGB quietly supported the communist Tudeh Party of Iran, helping the group form a united "progressive front" alongside other leftist groups. Initially, the USSR and Tudeh supported the religious leaders who came to power in Iran, hoping that their rule might give way to a more progressive movement afterwards. Since the broader Iranian leftist groups were reluctant to collaborate with the Tudeh Party, the KGB's role in subsequent years was limited to preventing covert links between CPSU International department and the Tudeh.

In November 1979, the Iran hostage crisis began, and Iran's ties with the U.S. were broken. This, however, did not mean changing the situation in Iran in favor of the USSR. Iranian leadership was determined to prevent the growing influence of its northern neighbor. The Soviet invasion of Afghanistan in December 1979 led to a further cooling of Iranian-Soviet relations and prompted repeated attacks on the Soviet embassy. Soviet intelligence operations suffered, with the conditions for work with sources being extremely complex.

In 1982, the Soviet residence in Tehran was thrown into turmoil by the defection of Vladimir Kuzichkin, one of Shebarshin's subordinates. Kuzichkin defected by going to the British interests department at the Swedish embassy in Tehran. He shared numerous Soviet secrets with the British, who would share them further with the CIA as well as the Khomeini regime. Kuzichkin and British officials claim that his defection was spontaneous, but Shebarshin believed the British recruited him for some time.

The fiasco caused great shame for Shebarshin and may have been part of the reason he was recalled to Moscow in 1983. Shebarshin claimed he was recalled to avoid being expelled by the Iranians, who were in the process of cracking down on Soviet agents and Iranian leftists.

Shebarshin left Iran in February 1983. The Iranian regime had begun arresting opposition group leaders, including leader of the Tudeh party, Noureddin Kianouri, who, among many others in the party, was forced to publicly confess to spying for the USSR.

== Later life ==
In 1983, Shebarshin returned to Moscow headquarters for a few months under the chief of the PGU KGB, Vladimir Kryuchkov. Shebarshin was appointed deputy chief of the information-analytical department of intelligence. In 1984 Shebarshin, accompanying Kryuchkov, went on a mission in Kabul. Through mid-1991, he had to join more than 20 missions in the Democratic Republic of Afghanistan, in attempts to become intimately familiar with the leaders of the country: Babrak Karmal, Mohammad Najibullah, and Sultan Ali Keshtmand. In 1987, Shebarshin was appointed deputy chief of PGU KGB, second in command after Kryuchkov, and managed intelligence operations in the Middle East and Africa. In February 1989, he replaced Kryuchkov as head of the First Chief Directorate and was promoted to the rank of lieutenant general.

In August 1991, Shebarshin played a secondary role when KGB Chief Kryuchkov launched an unsuccessful coup against Mikhail Gorbachev. He followed Kryuchkov's orders to activate FCD agents and paramilitary units in Moscow, but instructed them to only take orders directly from Shebarshin himself. A few days into the coup, Shebarshin realized it had no chance of success, and stopped coordinating with the plotters. In under a week, the coup was over, with Kryuchkov and other members of the Gang of Eight in custody. Shebarshin met with Gorbachev, and was appointed the new head of the KGB.

He served for a single day. RSFSR President Boris Yeltsin objected to the appointment and demanded a new candidate. He was replaced by Vadim Bakatin, whose job was essentially to dismantle the KGB. Shebarshin returned to his post as FCD head until Bakatin announced a new FCD deputy director, Vladimir Rozhkov, without consulting him. Shebarshin resigned from his post on 20 September 1991.

Shebarshin was awarded the Order of the Red Banner (1981) and the Order of the Red Star (1970). He also earned badges "For Service of Intelligence" (1967) and "Honorary State Security Officer" (1972).

With his friend, Nikolai Leonov, Shebarshin founded a consulting firm in 1991, the Russian National Economic Security Service (RNESS) (Russian: Российской национальной службы экономической безопасности (РНСЭБ)), which is based in Moscow and was part of the structures associated with Alex Konanykhin during its first year of existence.

At the age of 77, Shebarshin took his own life by shooting himself at his home in Moscow. By that time, he had survived a stroke which led to complete blindness. According to his friends and colleagues, he suffered serious illnesses, which may have motivated his suicide.

== See also ==
- Vladimir Lokhov

Government offices
Preceded by Vladimir Kryuchkov	Head of Soviet Committee of State Security; 1991	Succeeded by Vadim Bakatin
