= Lyudmila Nuikina =

Russian intelligence officer

Lyudmila Ivanovna Nuikina
- Born: Russian: Людмила Ивановна Нуйкина; October 23, 1936 (age 89) village of Verkh-Uba, Shemonaikhinsky district, East Kazakhstan region of the Kazakh Autonomous Soviet Socialist Republic (now Kazakhstan).
- Awards: Order of the Red Banner
- Espionage activity
- Allegiance: Soviet Union
- Service branch: KGB
- Service years: 1960–2006
- Rank: Colonel

Lyudmila Ivanovna Nuikina (born October 23, 1936) — retired illegal Russian intelligence officer, retired colonel of the KGB of the USSR.

== Biography ==
She was born on October 23, 1936, in the village of Verkh-Uba, Shemonaikhinsky district of the East Kazakhstan region of the Kazakh Autonomous Soviet Socialist Republic (now Kazakhstan).

After graduating from a medical school in Ust-Kamenogorsk, she worked for 5 years as a midwife in her native village. In 1960, she married Vitaly Nuikin, with whom she lived 38 years before his death in 1998.

She served in the Office "C" (illegal intelligence) of the First Main Directorate of KGB of the USSR. She passed a special training course for an illegal illegal scout, perfectly mastering French, Spanish and English.

Together with her husband Vitaly Nuikin, until 1986, she worked in more than 18 countries. She took a direct part in the implementation of a number of specific operational tasks of the center. A married couple of illegal intelligence agents Nuikins successfully solved a large range of tasks facing intelligence. They worked in states with a strict administrative and police regime in conditions that posed a risk to life.

She had established itself as a resourceful and determined employee. She assisted her husband in intelligence activities in special conditions. For courage and heroism in performing special tasks, she was awarded the Order of the Red Star (for the extraction of materials of foreign secret military development) and the medal "For Courage".

In connection with the betrayal of the Colonel of the PSU of the KGB of the USSR Oleg Gordievsky, the spouses Nuikina were forced to return to the USSR and continued to work successfully in the central apparatus of foreign intelligence.

Since 2006, Colonel L. Nuikina has been retired. After retiring, she continued to participate in the training and education of young illegal intelligence officers. She now lives in Moscow

On January 28, 2020, the Director of the Russian Foreign Intelligence Service S. Ye. Naryshkin at a press conference in the Russia Today MIA named the names of illegal intelligence agents who made a significant contribution to ensuring the country's security and protecting its interests with their heroic work. Among those named was Vitaly Nuikin. Data on the identity of the wife of Nuikin Lyudmila Ivanovna in illegal intelligence was officially announced by the SVR in September 2017.

== Personal life ==
Husband - Vitaly Nuikin (1939–1998) - a Russian illegal intelligence officer, retired colonel of the Foreign Intelligence Service.
