= The Biltmore Mayfair =

Hotel in London, England

- Former names: Millennium Hotel London Mayfair
- Hotel chain: The Biltmore Hotels

General information
- Location: 44 Grosvenor Square; Mayfair, London, England
- Coordinates: 51°30′38″N 0°9′3″W
- Opened: 1969
- Owner: Millennium & Copthorne

Design and construction
- Architect: Richard Seifert

Other information
- Number of rooms: 251
- Number of suites: 57

Website
- Official website

The Biltmore Mayfair is a 5-star luxury hotel located at 44 Grosvenor Square in the Mayfair area of London, England. It underwent significant renovations starting in late 2017 and reopened on 9 September 2019.

== History ==
The building was designed by architect Richard Seifert and constructed from 1967 to 1969 by Grand Metropolitan Hotels as the Britannia Hotel. It has a classical red-brick facade facing Grosvenor Square, and a modern concrete, brick and glass facade facing Adam's Row. The hotel was renamed the Britannia Inter-Continental London in 1981, after Grand Metropolitan acquired Inter-Continental Hotels.

The hotel was bought by Millennium & Copthorne Hotels on 7 October 1996 and renamed the Millennium Britannia Hotel. It was renovated in 2000 and renamed the Millennium Hotel London Mayfair. The hotel's Pine Bar was the site of the poisoning of Alexander Litvinenko in 2006.

The hotel was renovated again beginning in November 2017, at an estimated cost of £50 million. It closed in July 2018 to complete the renovations and reopened on 9 September 2019 as The Biltmore Mayfair, LXR Hotels & Resorts managed by the LXR luxury division of Hilton. The hotel left Hilton on 1 May 2024 and now operates as part of The Biltmore Hotels brand of Millennium & Copthorne.
