= Alexander Bastrykin =

Russian lawyer

- Александр Бастрыкин
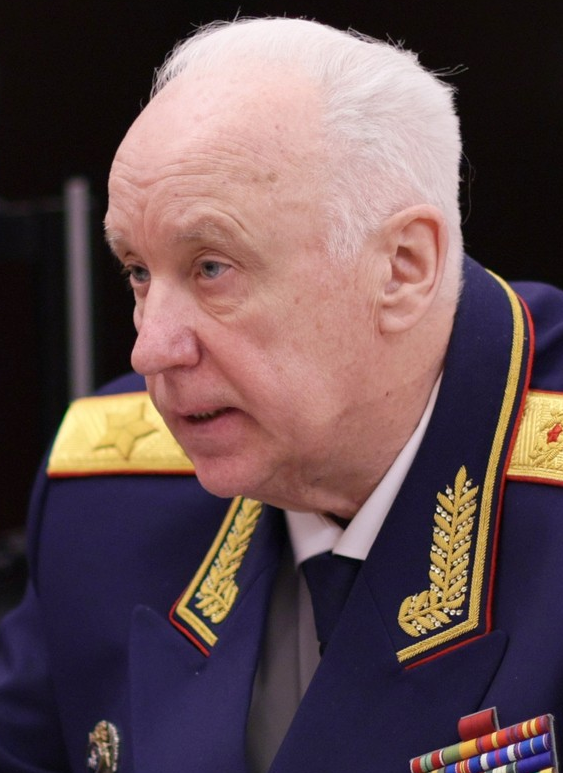
- Bastrykin in 2026

Chairman of the Investigative Committee of Russia
- Incumbent
- Assumed office 15 January 2011
- President: Dmitry Medvedev; Vladimir Putin
- Preceded by: Office established

First Deputy Prosecutor General of Russia
- In office 7 September 2007 – 14 January 2011
- Prosecutor General: Yury Chaika

Personal details
- Born: 27 August 1953 (age 73) Pskov, Russian SFSR, Soviet Union
- Education: Leningrad State University

Alexander Ivanovich Bastrykin (Russian: Алекса́ндр Ива́нович Бастры́кин, born 27 August 1953) is a Russian lawyer who has served as the Chairman of the Investigative Committee of Russia since 15 January 2011. He served as the First Deputy Prosecutor General of Russia and Chairman of the Investigative Committee of the Prosecutor General's Office from 2007 to 2011.

He holds the special rank of General of Justice, the academic rank of Professor, and a doctoral degree in law.

== Biography ==
Alexander Bastrykin graduated from the Law Faculty of Leningrad State University in 1975, and was a university classmate of Vladimir Putin.

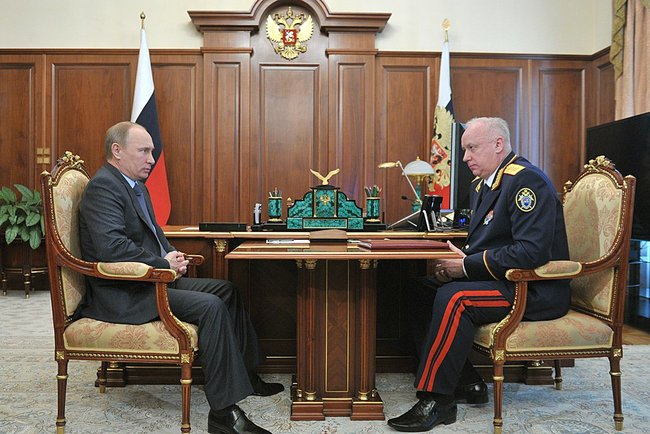
Bastrykin and Vladimir Putin in working meeting, 21 February 2013

In 2007, President Vladimir Putin established the Investigative Committee of the Prosecutor General's Office, de facto independent from the Prosecutor General's Office, and Bastrykin became its first chairman. The appointment was reportedly instigated by Igor Sechin, wishing to retain his influence after the dismissal of his close ally Vladimir Ustinov from the position of prosecutor general in 2006.

On November 28, 2009, as head of the Investigative Committee at the scene of the 2009 Nevsky Express bombing, Bastrykin was injured by a second bomb and was hospitalised. The second bomb was reportedly targeted at investigators, and was detonated by mobile phone.

Bastrykin is considered to be an intimate advisor of President Putin.

In July 2022, amid the 2022 Russian invasion of Ukraine, he announced that the Investigative Committee had opened 1300 criminal investigations against Ukrainian prisoners of war, saying that 92 of them had already been charged with crimes against humanity. The announcement drew criticism from human rights experts, with Amnesty International saying that the Russian government "shared no evidence to support these charges" and that "willfully depriving a prisoner of war of fair trial rights constitutes a war crime."

In August 2025 it was reported that following the death of Irina Podnosova, Bastrykin turned down an offer from Putin to become the chairman of the Supreme Court of Russia.

== Controversies ==
=== Plagiarism ===
Bastrykin holds a doctor of law degree, and has published more than 100 scholarly works in Russia.

In 2007 Bastrykin was publicly accused of plagiarism, because parts of his then new book "Signs of the Hand. Dactyloscopy" (2004) had been rewritten from the famous book of German writer Jürgen Thorwald.

In 2013 these accusations were confirmed and supplemented by Dissernet community and its founder Sergey Parkhomenko: it was found that Bastrykin's book also contains an entire chapter from the book by Anthony Summers "The Secret Life of J. Edgar Hoover" (in Russian translation "The FBI Empire – Myths, Secrets, Intrigues").

=== Sanctions and blacklistings ===
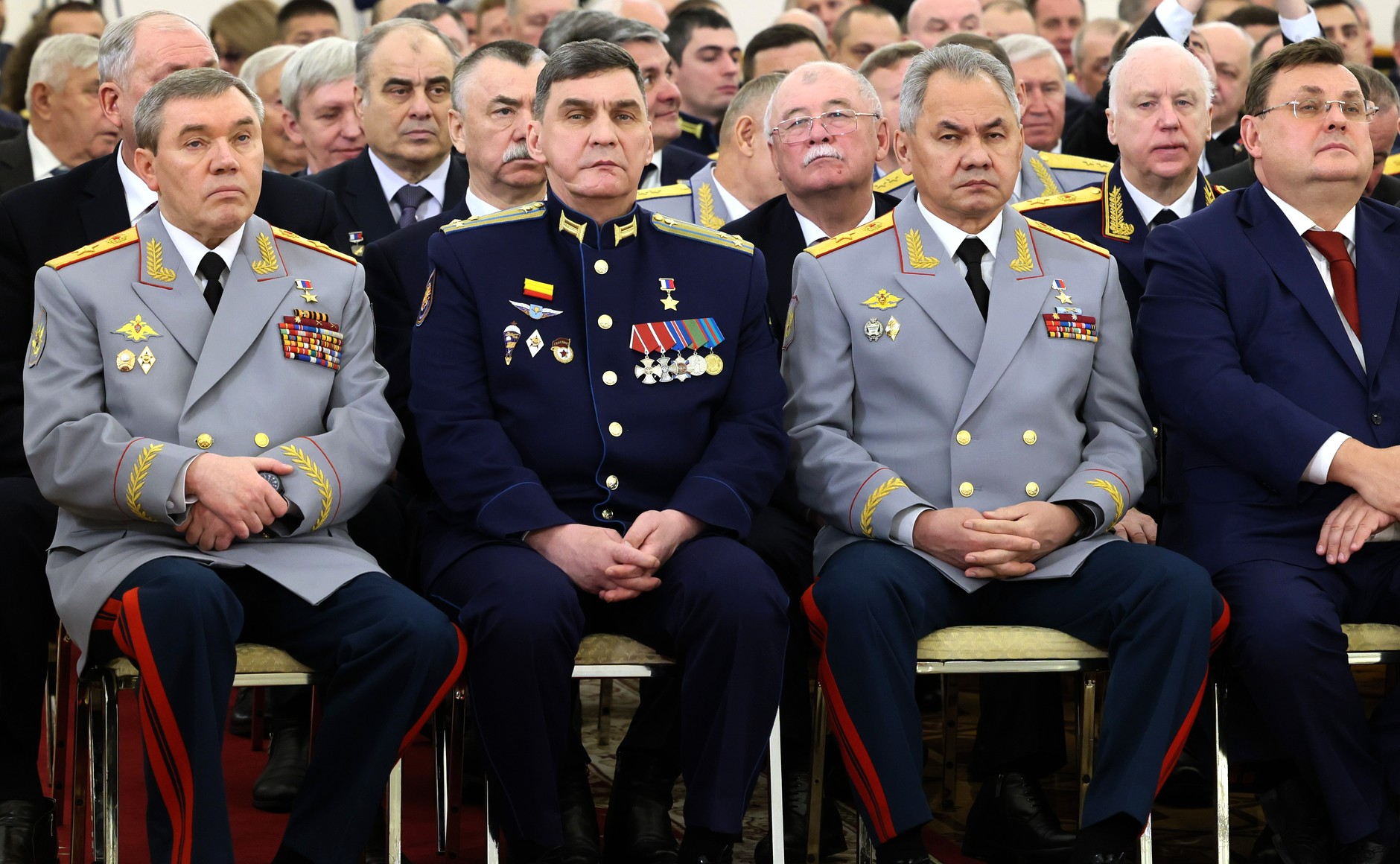
Bastrykin, Valery Gerasimov, Sergei Shoigu, Konstantin Chuychenko and other prominent figures of the Putin regime at award ceremonies on 8 December 2022

On January 9, 2017, under the Magnitsky Act, the United States Treasury's Office of Foreign Assets Control updated its Specially Designated Nationals List and blacklisted Aleksandr I. Bastrykin, Andrei K. Lugovoi, Dmitri V. Kovtun, Stanislav Gordievsky, and Gennady Plaksin, which froze any of their assets held by American financial institutions or transactions with those institutions and banned their travelling to the United States.

On 6 July 2020, the government of the United Kingdom imposed sanctions on Bastrykin as part of a move to sanction a number of Russians and Saudis for having 'blood on their hands'.

=== Secret residence permit and real estate in the Czech Republic ===
On 26 July 2012 Russian blogger and anticorruption activist Alexei Navalny published documents indicating that Bastrykin had a residence permit and owned real estate in the Czech Republic. Mr. Navalny wrote that the real estate holding and residence permit in a country belonging to NATO, a military alliance opposed to Russia, should raise questions about Mr. Bastrykin's security clearance for work in law enforcement and access to state secrets.

=== Threatening journalists ===
According to Dmitry Muratov, Bastrykin threatened the life of newspaper editor Sergei Sokolov, and jokingly assured him that he would investigate the murder himself.

=== 2022 war censorship laws ===
In March 2022, Russian journalist Alexander Nevzorov wrote to Bastrykin that Russia's 2022 war censorship laws, which introduced prison sentences of up to 15 years for those who publish "knowingly false information" about the Russian military and its operations, violate the freedom of speech provisions of the Constitution of Russia.

== Political views and legislative initiatives ==
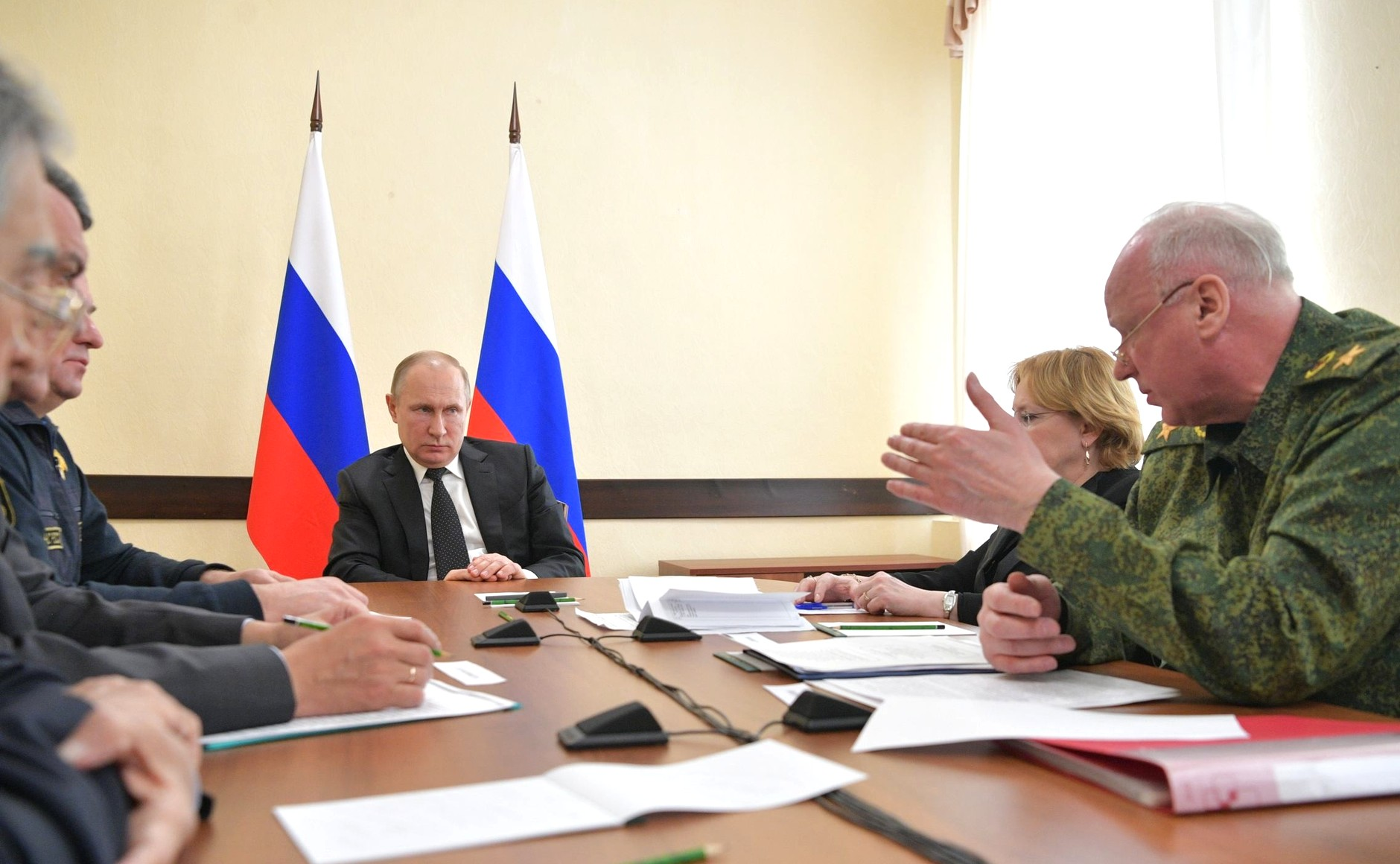
Bastrykin and Putin in working meeting, 27 March 2018

In 2015, Bastrykin proposed to amend article 15 of the Constitution of Russia by establishing the priority of national laws over universally recognized principles and norms of international law and international agreements ratified by Russian Federation (it is possible only through the adoption of the new Constitution because article 15 appears in chapter 1, established the fundamental principles of the constitutional order).

In 2016, Bastrykin expressed the need to establish official national ideology and censor the Internet, on the grounds that there is information warfare against Russia launched by USA and its allies. As such proposals clash with the provisions of chapters 1 and 2 of the Constitution of Russia, established the fundamental principles of the constitutional order and the fundamental rights of citizens, the complaint was lodged against Bastrykin with the General Prosecutor's Office of Russian Federation but the General Prosecutor's Office refused to initiate an investigation.

== Honors and awards ==
- Order for Merit to the Fatherland, 2nd and 4th class
- Order of Alexander Nevsky
- Order of Honor
- Medal "In Commemoration of the 300th Anniversary of Saint Petersburg"
- Medal of Anatoly Koni
- Medal in Commemoration of the 200th Anniversary of the Ministry of Justice
- Medals "For Diligence" 1st and 2nd classes (Ministry of Justice)
- Russian Federation Presidential Certificate of Honor (2009)
- Honorary Title of Honored Jurist of the Russian Federation
- Order of Friendship (Armenia, 2016)
- Order of Honor (Ingushetia, 2013)
- Order of Honor (South Ossetia, 2009)
