= Valerie Pettit =

British MI6 operative

Valerie Pettit, OBE (13 June 1929 – 28 December 2019) was a British MI6 operative known for smuggling Oleg Antonovich Gordievsky, a Soviet double agent, out of the Soviet Union. She devised and led an elaborate escape plan called Operation Pimlico, which extracted Gordievsky from the USSR after he was exposed by Aldrich Ames, an American double agent, in 1985. Gordievsky was considered the most valuable secret service mole in the KGB during Pettit's time.

== Biography ==
Pettit was born on 13 June 1929, near Lord's Cricket Ground in London. She was the eldest daughter of Charles Pettit and Valerie Douglas. Her father was a solicitor while her mother was a Scottish dancer. Pettit obtained her degree from the University of Exeter. Little is known about her career and when neighbours reportedly asked about her work, she is said to have stated that she was employed as a secretary for the British Foreign Office. She was recruited by the Secret Intelligence Service while working there.

== Operation Pimlico ==
The MI6 was able to recruit Oleg Gordievsky as a double agent in October 1974 while he was a KGB public relations line officer in Copenhagen. By 1982, he was posted in London and three years later was appointed resident-designate of the Soviet mission. Pettit became his MI6 case officer. He was, however, exposed by Aldrich Ames, an avaricious Soviet double agent CIA officer, in 1985. On 28 May that year he was ordered to fly back to Moscow for a meeting with the KGB Chairman and the head of First Chief Directorate. He was subjected to interrogation and close surveillance after his arrival. Fearing for his life, Gordievsky requested emergency exfiltration.

Despite the generally-accepted notion that an escape would be impossible, Pettit had drafted an operation plan in 1978, that would eventually be approved by then-prime minister Margaret Thatcher. During this period, she was already the deputy to the head of MI6's Soviet operations section. The rescue, called "Operation Pimlico", transported Gordievsky to the Finnish border in the boot of a diplomat's car after an elaborate rendezvous in Moscow, then to the UK by way of Norway.

== Later years ==
In the account of Gordievsky's escape in The Spy and the Traitor, Pettit was referred to as "Veronica Price". After retirement, Pettit lived with her mother and sister in the village West Clandon in Surrey. She died on 28 December 2019. After her death, the book's author Ben MacIntyre, who was able to interview her, described the spy as "one of those brisk, practical, quintessentially English women who brooks no nonsense."
