= Vladimir Lokhov =

Soviet official

- Born: Vladimir Iosifovich Lokhov; 22 December 1924; Pichidzhin, Znaur District, South Ossetian Autonomous Oblast, Georgian SSR, Soviet Union
- Died: 2002 (aged 77–78); Moscow, Russia
- Burial place: Troyekurovskoye Cemetery
- Education: Law Faculty of Azerbaijan State University
- Awards: Order of the Red Banner of Labour; Order of the Red Star
- Espionage activity
- Allegiance: Soviet Union
- Service branch: KGB
- Service years: 1957–1991
- Rank: Colonel

Vladimir Iosifovich Lokhov (Russian: Владимир Иосифович Лохов; 22 December 1924 – 2002) was a Soviet intelligence officer, and colonel of the KGB of the USSR.

== Biography ==
Lokhov was born on 22 December 1924 in the village of Pichidzhin, Znaur District, in the South Ossetian Autonomous Oblast, part of the Georgian SSR, Soviet Union. He was of Ossetian nationality.

From 1942 to 1948, Lokhov served in the 30th division of the troops of the NKVD — Ministry of Internal Affairs of the USSR. Since 1952, he has been employed in the state security agencies. In 1953, he graduated from the Law Faculty of Azerbaijan State University. In 1952-1957 he worked as an assistant to the detective and detective of the 5th department of the MGB — Ministry of Internal Affairs of the Azerbaijan SSR — the State Security Committee (KGB) under the Council of Ministers (CM) of the Azerbaijan Soviet Socialist Republic.

Since 1957 Lokhov was an employee of the Office "C" (illegal intelligence) of the First Chief Directorate (CCGT, foreign intelligence) of the KGB under the USSR Council of Ministers - the KGB of the USSR. Until August 1962, he was trained to work in special conditions. He worked as an illegal scout in a number of countries in Asia, Europe, and the East. When performing critical tasks, he visited dozens of states in these regions. In August 1963, he began illegal work in one of the Asian countries, where he was successfully legalized for a long time and created the necessary conditions for conducting intelligence work from illegal positions.

In November 1965, a valuable and reliable agent was transferred to Lokhov for communication, with the help of which, over time, he managed to form an effective agent network. Skillful steps during legalization allowed Vladimir Lokhov, as an illegal resident, to direct the indicated valuable agents and receive important classified materials from her. In 1973, he returned to the USSR, worked as an illegal trainer. In January 1979, he was appointed head of the 1st department (“where the most-classified illegal immigrants worked”, the “illegal immigrants of the center” of the Office “C” of the PSU of the KGB of the USSR), which he headed until 1991. He supervised the activities of the most valuable illegal intelligence officers of the KGB of the USSR, in particular, the work of the legendary pair of intelligence spouses Gevork Andreyevich Vartanyan and Gohar Levonovna Vartanyan. During these years, he directly developed and organized the implementation of many of the most important operations of Soviet intelligence.

Lokhov retired due to his age in July 1991. The Center passed on the experience to the younger generation of scouts. In retirement, he lived in Moscow, dying there in 2002. He was buried in the city's Troyekurovskoye Cemetery.

== Awards ==
- Order of the Red Banner of Labour (31 July 1985)
- Order of the Red Star (1977)
- Medal "For Battle Merit" (1967)
- Medals of the USSR and the Russian Federation
- Badge "Honorary State Security Officer" (1970)

== See also ==
- Leonid Shebarshin
- Vitaly Nuikin
