= Dmitry Kovtun =

Russian businessman and KGB agent (1965–2022)

- Дмитрий Ковтун
- Born: 25 September 1965; Moscow
- Died: 4 June 2022 (aged 56); Moscow
- Alma mater: Moscow Higher Combined Arms Command School
- Occupation: Intelligence agent
- Employer: KGB

Dmitry Vladimirovich Kovtun (Russian: Дмитрий Владимирович Ковтун; 25 September 1965 – 4 June 2022) was a Russian businessman and KGB agent who was suspected to have murdered the former Russian spy and later British citizen Alexander Litvinenko in London, England. In 2021 the European Court of Human Rights found beyond reasonable doubt that Andrey Lugovoy and Kovtun had killed Litvinenko.

== Early life and education ==
Dmitry Vladimirovich Kovtun was born on 25 September 1965, into a military family in Moscow on 25 September 1965. Andrei Lugovoy was his childhood friend and classmate.

He attended the Moscow Higher Military Command School in the 1980s.

== Career ==
After graduation, Kovtun and Lugovoi began to serve at the KGB's ninth directorate that was charged with the protection of top Kremlin officials. After the collapse of the USSR, they became involved in the security business. He was also a business consultant.

== Alexander Litvinenko radiation investigation ==
=== Radiation investigation ===
Kovtun met ex-spy Alexander Litvinenko in London on several occasions, first in mid-October and later only hours before Litvinenko fell ill on 1 November. On 9 December 2006, German police report finding traces of radiation at Hamburg flat used by Kovtun. According to German investigators, the polonium traces were found on a couch where Kovtun is believed to have slept at his ex-wife's apartment in Hamburg (Altona-Ottensen) the night before he headed to London for a meeting with Litvinenko and according to British investigators, polonium traces were found on the airplanes in which Kovtun traveled between Moscow and London. Polonium traces were also found in Kovtun's car in Hamburg.

Both Russian and British investigators interviewed Kovtun. German detectives investigated Kovtun's suspected participation in plutonium smuggling into Germany. Germany dropped the case against Kovtun in November 2009.

Kovtun was hospitalised in Moscow with radiation poisoning at the beginning of December 2006. On 12 December 2006, he told Russia's Channel One TV that his "health was improving." Kovtun said that he had only one explanation for the presence of polonium: "It is that I brought it back from London, where I met Alexander Litvinenko on October 16, 17 and 18." British detectives believe the contrary, that Litvinenko was not contaminated until the meeting on 1 November.

Various theories of Kovtun's involvement have been discussed in the media. One theory is that he was the murderer or an accomplice of one of the murderers of Alexander Litvinenko and mishandled the substance used, polonium-210.

=== Accusation ===
The Crown Prosecution Service accused Kovtun as being the second suspect of murdering Alexander Litvinenko based on the discovery of new evidence in 2011 and requested his extradition to England to stand trial in February 2012.

In March 2015, Kovtun appeared on BBC News at Ten offering to give evidence, from Russia by video-link, to the enquiry into Litvinenko's death. He said he had "heard a lot of statements which are easy to refute" and by participating he could "get access to the documents – including the secret material – so I can make my own conclusions".

In 2021, the European Court of Human Rights (ECHR) in Strasbourg found beyond reasonable doubt that Andrey Lugovoy and Dmitry Kovtun killed Litvinenko.

== Sanctions ==
On 9 January 2017, under the Magnitsky Act, the United States Treasury's Office of Foreign Assets Control updated its Specially Designated Nationals List and blacklisted Aleksandr I. Bastrykin, Andrei K. Lugovoi, Dmitri V. Kovtun, Stanislav Gordievsky, and Gennady Plaksin, which froze any of their assets held by American financial institutions or transactions with those institutions and banned their travelling to the United States.

== Death ==
Kovtun died at a Moscow hospital on 4 June 2022, aged 56, due to complications of COVID-19.

== See also ==
- Anna Politkovskaya
- Mario Scaramella
