= Paul Joyal =

American security analyst (born 1954)

Paul M. Joyal
- Born: 1954 (age 71–72)
- Education: Master's degree in international relations
- Alma mater: Catholic University of America
- Occupations: Security analyst, Media commentator
- Employer: National Strategies Inc.
- Known for: Expertise on Russia and former Soviet countries
- Notable work: Fifteen Years of Espionage (book)

Paul M. Joyal (born 1954) is an American security analyst and media commentator who frequently comments on political and security matters concerning Russia and former Soviet countries. He was a staff member for the United States Senate Select Committee on Intelligence. Joyal holds a master's degree in international relations from the Catholic University of America.

== Career ==
In 1991, Joyal founded a security consulting company, Intercon International USA Inc., which published a weekly newsletter about security affairs in the former Soviet bloc. He later became a vice president at, and currently serves as managing director at National Strategies Inc.

He has been cited as an expert source by many news outlets, including Time Magazine and PBS The NewsHour with Jim Lehrer. His published works include the book Fifteen Years of Espionage (ISBN 0935067140) and "Singling out Arab-Americans," the January 21, 1991, editorial in the Washington Post

He has close ties with the government of the Republic of Georgia: in 1998 he acted as the country's first lobbyist to the U.S. Government, and he is listed as the contact for the 501(c)(3) charitable organization founded by former Georgian president Eduard Shevardnadze. In 2005 he spoke at the Georgian Embassy in Washington, DC, at the memorial service for Zurab Zhvania, the former speaker of the Georgian Parliament.

== Murder attempt ==
A critic of the administration of Russian president Vladimir Putin, in late February 2007 Joyal told Dateline NBC that the murder of former KGB agent Alexander Litvinenko served as a warning to all critics of the Putin government.

A few days later, on March 1, Joyal was shot and wounded outside his home in Adelphi, Maryland. The Washington Post reported that the attack was under investigation by the FBI. Earlier that evening, Joyal had dined with former KGB general Oleg Kalugin; Kalugin (whom the Russian Government accused of being a US agent) later told The Washington Post that he was not sure whether the attack was politically motivated.

His attackers have not been found.
