= Oleg Gordievsky =

KGB colonel and double agent (1938–2025)

Oleg Gordievsky CMG
- Олег Гордиевский
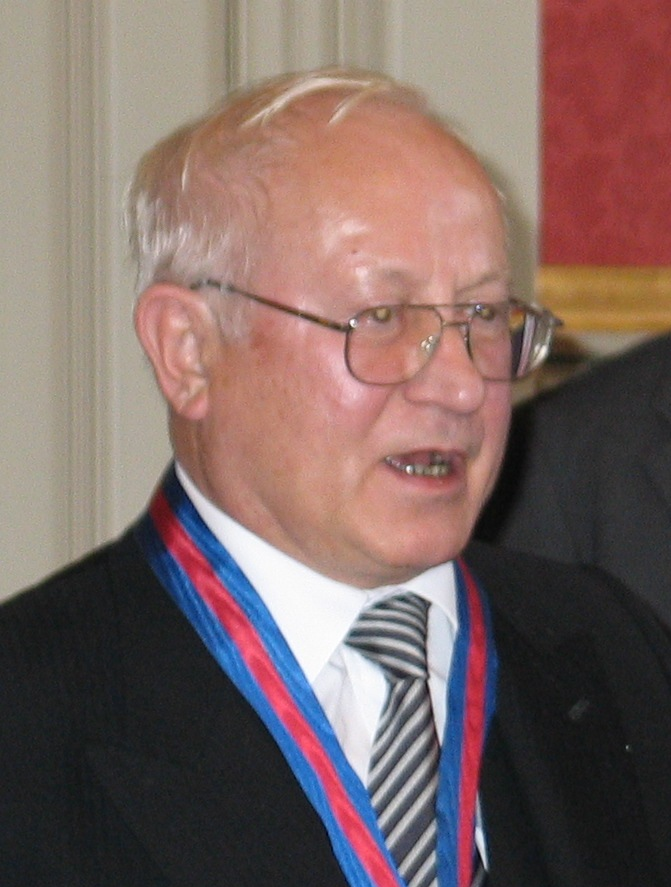
- Gordievsky in 2007
- Born: Oleg Antonovich Gordievsky; 10 October 1938; Moscow, Russian SFSR, Soviet Union
- Died: 4 March 2025 (aged 86); Godalming, Surrey, United Kingdom
- Occupation: Spy
- Awards: CMG
- Espionage activity
- Allegiance: Soviet Union; United Kingdom (secret agent since 1974)
- Service branch: KGB; MI6
- Rank: Colonel of the KGB
- Codename: SUNBEAM; PIMLICO; NOCTON; OVATION; TICKLE
- Oleg Gordievsky's voice from the BBC programme MI6: A Century in the Shadows, 3 August 2009

Oleg Antonovich Gordievsky CMG (Russian: Оле́г Анто́нович Гордие́вский; assumed name: Anton Kelsen CMG; 10 October 1938 – 4 March 2025) was a colonel of the KGB who became KGB resident-designate (rezident) and bureau chief in London and a British spy.

Gordievsky was a double agent, providing information to the British Secret Intelligence Service (MI6) from 1974 to 1985. After being recalled to Moscow under suspicion, he was exfiltrated from the Soviet Union in July 1985 under a plan code-named Operation Pimlico. The Soviet Union subsequently sentenced him to death in absentia.

== Early life and education ==
Gordievsky was born in 1938, the son of an officer of the NKVD (the Soviet secret police and precursor to the KGB). He proved an excellent student at school, where he learned to speak German. He studied at a prestigious Moscow university, the Moscow State Institute of International Relations, and later undertook NKVD training, where in addition to espionage skills he mastered German and also learned to speak Danish, Swedish, and Norwegian.

== Career ==
On completion of his studies, Gordievsky joined the foreign service and was posted to East Berlin in August 1961, just before the erection of the Berlin Wall. The building of the wall appalled him and he became disillusioned with the Soviet system. After spending a year in Berlin, he returned to Moscow. Gordievsky became disenchanted with his work in the KGB during his first Danish posting, particularly after the Warsaw Pact invasion of Czechoslovakia in 1968. He tried to send a covert sympathetic message to the Politiets Efterretningstjeneste (PET, Danish Security Intelligence Service), but his three-year stint ended and he returned to Moscow before making any direct contact. By the time he returned to Copenhagen in October 1972 for a second three-year stint, both the PET and MI6, which had been tipped off by one of Gordievsky's old university friends, felt that he was a persuadable agent. MI6 subsequently made contact with Gordievsky, and began running him as a double agent in 1974. MI6 gave him the codename SUNBEAM. His second posting to Denmark ended in 1978 and he was recalled to Moscow, this time for a lengthy period, because he had divorced his wife and married a woman with whom he had been having an affair. The KGB frowned upon affairs and divorces as immoral. During this Moscow period it was too risky for him to send any information to MI6.

After Gordievsky had learned to speak English he lobbied heavily for a position that became vacant in London, and the KGB posted him to London in June 1982. He steadily advanced in rank with the help of secret aid and manipulation by MI6, from which he received abundant non-damaging information and contacts. MI6 also steadily banished his direct superiors back to Moscow on trumped-up charges so that Gordievsky could take their place, and he continued to provide secret documents and information to MI6. While in London, his MI6 code name was NOCTON. The CIA, having been told of MI6's high-level informant, but not his name or position, gave him the codename TICKLE.

Two of Gordievsky's most important contributions were the averting of a potential nuclear confrontation with the Soviet Union in 1983, when the Soviets misinterpreted the NATO exercise Able Archer 83 as preparation for a first strike; and identifying Mikhail Gorbachev as the Soviet heir-apparent long before he came to prominence. The information supplied by Gordievsky provided the first proof of how worried the Soviet leadership had become about the possibility of a NATO nuclear first strike.

=== Sudden recall to Moscow ===
In late April 1985, Gordievsky was promoted to KGB station chief (resident-designate or rezident) in London at the Soviet embassy. He was abruptly summoned back to Moscow by telegram on 16 May 1985. MI6 allowed him to make his own decision about whether to defect immediately to the UK and live thenceforth in secrecy under their protection, or whether to return to Moscow on the understanding that he could be interrogated, tortured, or killed if the KGB suspected his betrayal. Gordievsky felt, given the huge benefits MI6 would reap if he remained rezident of the embassy, that he was being encouraged by MI6 to return to Moscow as ordered, and he decided to go. MI6 devised a plan to extricate him if necessary. On 19 May 1985, Gordievsky left for Moscow.

Although MI6 had passed on information provided by Gordievsky to the American CIA, the British would not reveal their source, so the CIA had conducted a covert operation to discover who the source was. After about a year, they realised that it must be Gordievsky. A CIA officer, Aldrich Ames, began selling secrets to the KGB and reported Gordievsky's treachery to Soviet counterintelligence. Ames first met and sold classified information to a KGB agent on 15 May 1985 in Washington, D.C.; the following day Gordievsky received a telegram from the KGB leadership recalling him to Moscow. A 1994 report by the Washington Post, however, stated that "After six weeks of questioning Ames ... the FBI and CIA remain baffled about whether Ames or someone else first warned the Soviets about Gordievsky". An FBI report later stated that Ames had not told the Soviets about Gordievsky until 13 June 1985; by that time, Gordievsky was under KGB surveillance, but he had not been charged with treason by 19 July 1985, when MI6 agents activated his escape plan. Biographer Ben Macintyre and most people involved in the Gordievsky case believe that during his first meeting with the KGB in Washington in early May 1985, Ames had provided sufficient information to prompt an investigation by Colonel Viktor Budanov, the KGB's top investigator, and trigger Gordievsky's recall.

After Gordievsky's arrival in Moscow on 19 May, he was taken to a KGB safe house outside Moscow, drugged, and interrogated. He was questioned for about five hours. After that, he was released and told that he would never work abroad again. He was suspected of espionage for a foreign power, but his superiors refrained from taking any overt further action against him. He was placed in a non-existent desk job in a nonoperational department of the KGB. Under increasing surveillance and pressure in Moscow, and seriously suspected of being a double agent, he managed in July 1985 to send a pre-arranged signal to MI6 that he needed to be rescued.

=== Escape from the USSR ===
An elaborate escape plan for extracting Gordievsky from the USSR had been devised by MI6 in 1978, when the KGB called him back to Moscow for a few years after his second three-year stint in Copenhagen. The escape plan was code-named "Operation Pimlico", and was devised by MI6 officer Valerie Pettit. Although Gordievsky almost certainly remained under KGB surveillance, he managed to send a covert signal to MI6 to activate "Pimlico", which had been in place for many years for just such an emergency. He waited on a particular street corner, on a particular weekday at 7:30 p.m., carrying a Safeway bag as a signal. An MI6 agent walked past carrying a Harrods bag, eating a Mars bar, and the two made eye contact. These mutual signals indicated that the escape plan was to be activated immediately.

On 19 July 1985, Gordievsky went for his usual jog. He managed to evade his KGB tails and boarded a train to Leningrad, and then travelled to a rendezvous south of Vyborg, near the Finnish border. There he was met by British embassy cars, after they had managed to lose the three KGB surveillance cars that had been following them, and was smuggled across the border into Finland in the boot (trunk) of a Ford Sierra saloon. His couriers were two British diplomats and their wives, and to deter sniffer dogs at the Finnish border one of the wives dropped her baby's dirty nappy on the ground, causing the dogs to flee. Gordievsky was flown to the UK via Norway. In the UK his MI6 codename was changed to OVATION.

Soviet authorities subsequently sentenced Gordievsky to death in absentia. The sentence was never rescinded by post-Soviet Russian authorities, but it could not be legally carried out because of Russia's then-membership in the Council of Europe. His wife, Leila (an Azeri), was the daughter of a KGB officer and was unaware of her husband's defection. She and their children were on holiday in the Azerbaijan SSR at the time of his escape. She was interrogated and detained for some six years, the Soviets presuming (wrongly) that she had been complicit in Gordievsky's activities. The marriage was in effect dead by then and it eventually ended. It was reported in 2013 that Gordievsky was in a long-term relationship with a British woman he had met in the 1990s.

Gordievsky's exfiltration greatly embarrassed both the KGB and the Soviet Union, and resulted in disruptions by Viktor Babunov, the KGB's chief of counterintelligence, within the KGB. It affected the KGB careers of Sergei Ivanov, KGB resident in Finland, numerous members of the Leningrad KGB, which was responsible for surveillance of British subjects, and numerous persons close to Vladimir Putin, who was a member of the Leningrad KGB. Gordievsky included a discussion of his exfiltration in his memoir, Next Stop Execution, published in 1995.

== Life in the UK ==
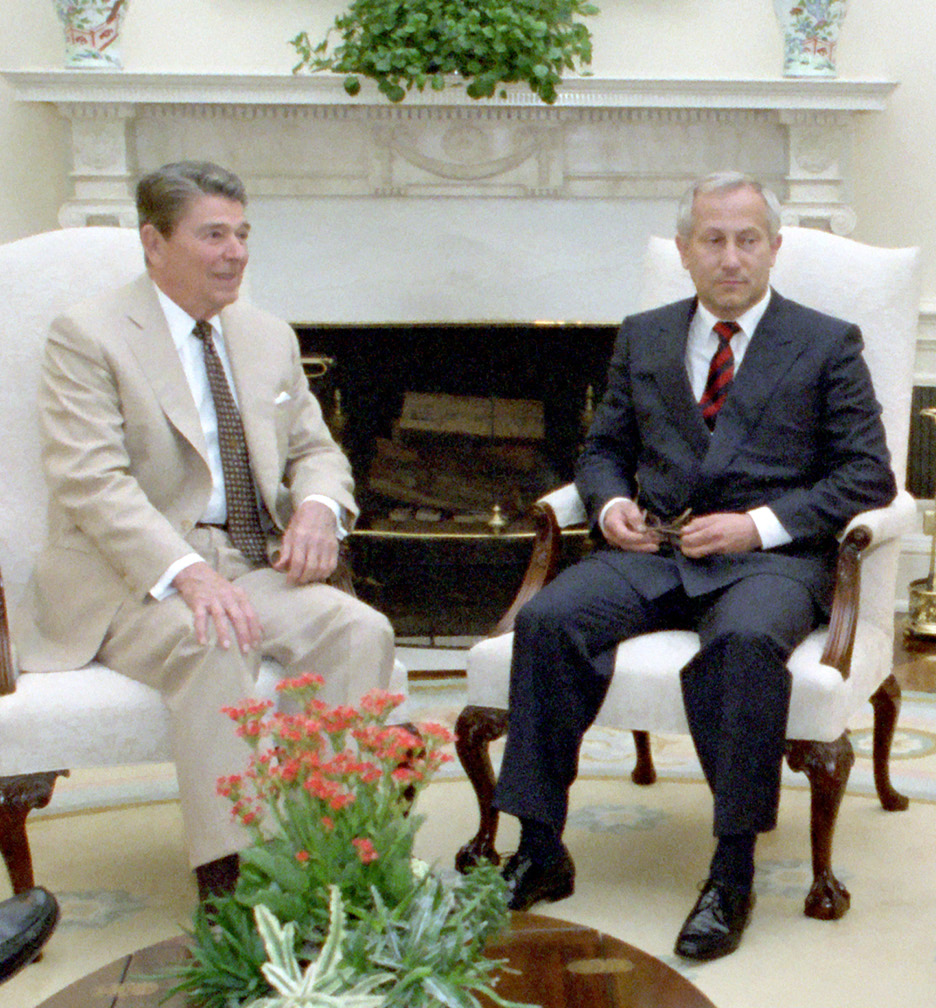
Gordievsky with U.S. President Ronald Reagan in 1987

Gordievsky wrote a number of books on the subject of the KGB and was frequently quoted in news media on the subject. In 1990, he was consultant editor of the journal Intelligence and National Security. He worked in television in the UK in the 1990s, including the game show Wanted. In 1995, the former British Labour Party leader Michael Foot received an out-of-court settlement (said to have been "substantial") from The Sunday Times after the newspaper alleged, in articles derived from claims in the original manuscript of Gordievsky's book Next Stop Execution (1995), that Foot was a KGB "agent of influence" with the codename 'Boot'.

On 26 February 2005, Gordievsky was awarded an Honorary Degree of Doctor of Letters by the University of Buckingham in recognition of his outstanding service to the security and the safety of the United Kingdom. He was appointed Companion of the Order of St Michael and St George (CMG) for "services to the security of the United Kingdom" in the 2007 Queen's Birthday Honours (in the Diplomatic List). The Guardian newspaper noted that it was "the same gong given (to) his fictional Cold War colleague James Bond".

Gordievsky said that the KGB were puzzled by, and denied, the claim that Director General of MI5 Roger Hollis was a Soviet agent. In the 2009 ITV programme Inside MI5: The Real Spooks, he recounted how he had witnessed the head of the British section of the KGB express surprise at allegations that he had read in a British newspaper about Roger Hollis being a KGB agent, saying "Why is it they are speaking about Roger Hollis, such nonsense, can't understand it, it must be some special British trick directed against us". The allegiance of Hollis remained a debated historical issue. The MI5 official website has cited Gordievsky's revelation as a vindication of Hollis.

In the Daily Telegraph in 2010, Charles Moore gave a "full account", which he said had been provided to him by Gordievsky shortly after Michael Foot's death, of the extent of Foot's alleged involvement with the KGB. Moore also wrote that, although the claims were difficult to corroborate without MI6 and KGB files, Gordievsky's past record in revealing KGB contacts in Britain had been shown to be reliable.

Gordievsky was featured in the PBS documentary Commanding Heights: The Battle for the World Economy. Work in later years included being a consultant editor for the journal National Security, co-hosting a television show titled Wanted in the Nineties and writing content for Literary Review. He lived for years in a "safe house" in London, and security was tightened after the Salisbury poisonings. A September 2018 article indicated that by that time he was living in an undisclosed location in the Home Counties of England.

=== Suspected poisoning ===
In April 2008, it was reported that on 2 November 2007 Gordievsky had been taken by ambulance from his home in Surrey to a local hospital, where he had spent 34 hours unconscious. He said he had been poisoned with thallium by "rogue elements in Moscow" and accused MI6 of forcing Special Branch to drop its early investigations into his allegations. According to him, the investigation was only reopened after the intervention of former MI5 Director General Eliza Manningham-Buller.

Gordievsky believed the culprit was a UK-based Russian business associate, who had supplied him with pills which he said were the sedative Xanax, purportedly for insomnia. He refused to identify the associate, saying British authorities had advised against it. Gordievsky accused MI6 of trying to prevent the incident from becoming known. "I realised they wanted to hush up the crime", he remarked. "There has been accusation and counter-accusation. If they are saying I am not affected by the poison, why did I spend two weeks in hospital?"

=== Death ===
Gordievsky died at his home in Godalming, Surrey, on 4 March 2025, at the age of 86.

== In popular media ==
In 2018, Ben Macintyre published a biography of Gordievsky, The Spy and the Traitor: The Greatest Espionage Story of the Cold War. The 2019 edition of the book included an Afterword of post-publication reactions from officers of MI6, the KGB, and the CIA who had been involved in the events surrounding Gordievsky.

In March 2020, Gordievsky's story was told in an episode of Spy Wars With Damian Lewis, on the Smithsonian Channel in the US, streaming on various cable services. The episode, "The Man Who Saved The World", recounted the "years-long effort by Gordievsky to pass Soviet intelligence to the British, all but preventing a nuclear Armageddon between the Soviet Union and the West".

In September 2025, The Rest is Classified podcast released six episodes detailing Gordievsky's work for MI6 and his eventual defection from the Soviet Union.

== Works ==
- Gordievsky, Oleg; Andrew, Christopher (1990). KGB: The Inside Story. Hodder & Stoughton. ISBN 0-340-48561-2.
- Gordievsky, Oleg; Andrew, Christopher (1990). The KGB. HarperCollins. ISBN 0-06-016605-3.
- Gordievsky, Oleg; Andrew, Christopher (1991). Instructions from the Centre: Top Secret Files on KGB Foreign Operations, 1975–85. Hodder & Stoughton. ISBN 0-340-56650-7.
- Gordievsky, Oleg; Andrew, Christopher (1992). More Instructions from the Centre: Top Secret Files on KGB Foreign Operations, 1975–85. Frank Cass Publishers. ISBN 0-7146-3475-1.
- Gordievsky, Oleg (1995). Next Stop Execution. Macmillan. ISBN 0-333-62086-0. Autobiography.
- Jakob Andersen with Oleg Gordievsky: De Røde Spioner – KGB's operationer i Danmark fra Stalin til Jeltsin, fra Stauning til Nyrup, Høst & Søn, Copenhagen (2002).

== See also ==
- List of Eastern Bloc defectors
- List of KGB defectors
- Vitaly Nuykin
- Oleg Penkovsky
