= List of Chechen people =

This is a partial list of notable Chechen people.

== Monarchs ==
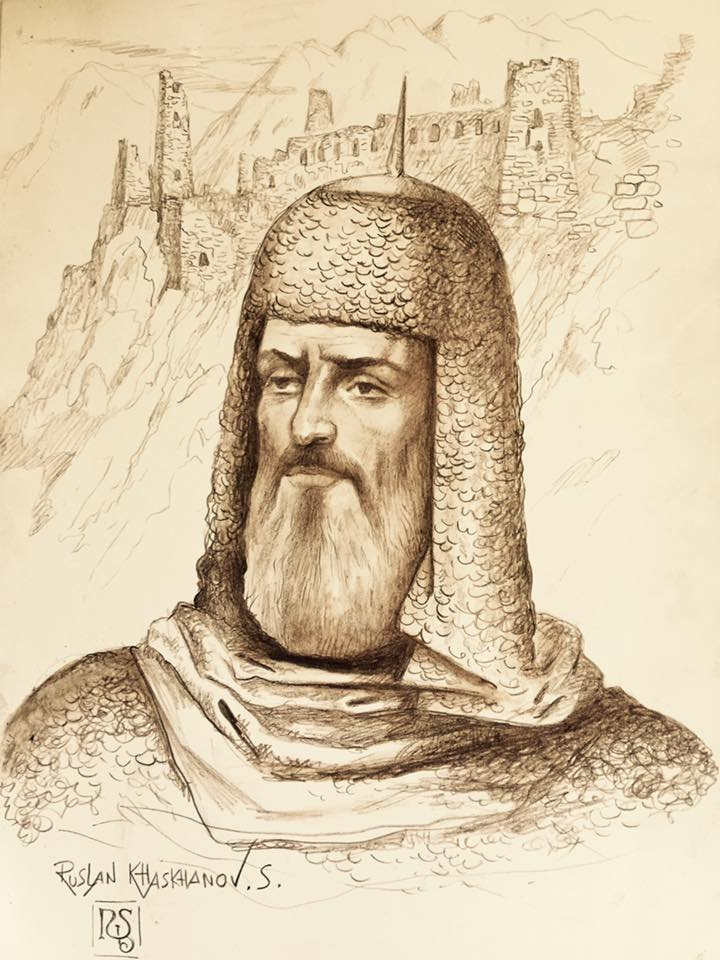
Shikh-Murza Okotsky

- Urshary-Murza Okotsky, Founder and first prince of the Principality of Okotsk, Father of Shikh-Murza Okotsky
- Batai-Murza Okotsky, Third prince of Okotsk and son of Shikh Okotsky

== Military personnel ==
=== 13th–19th century ===
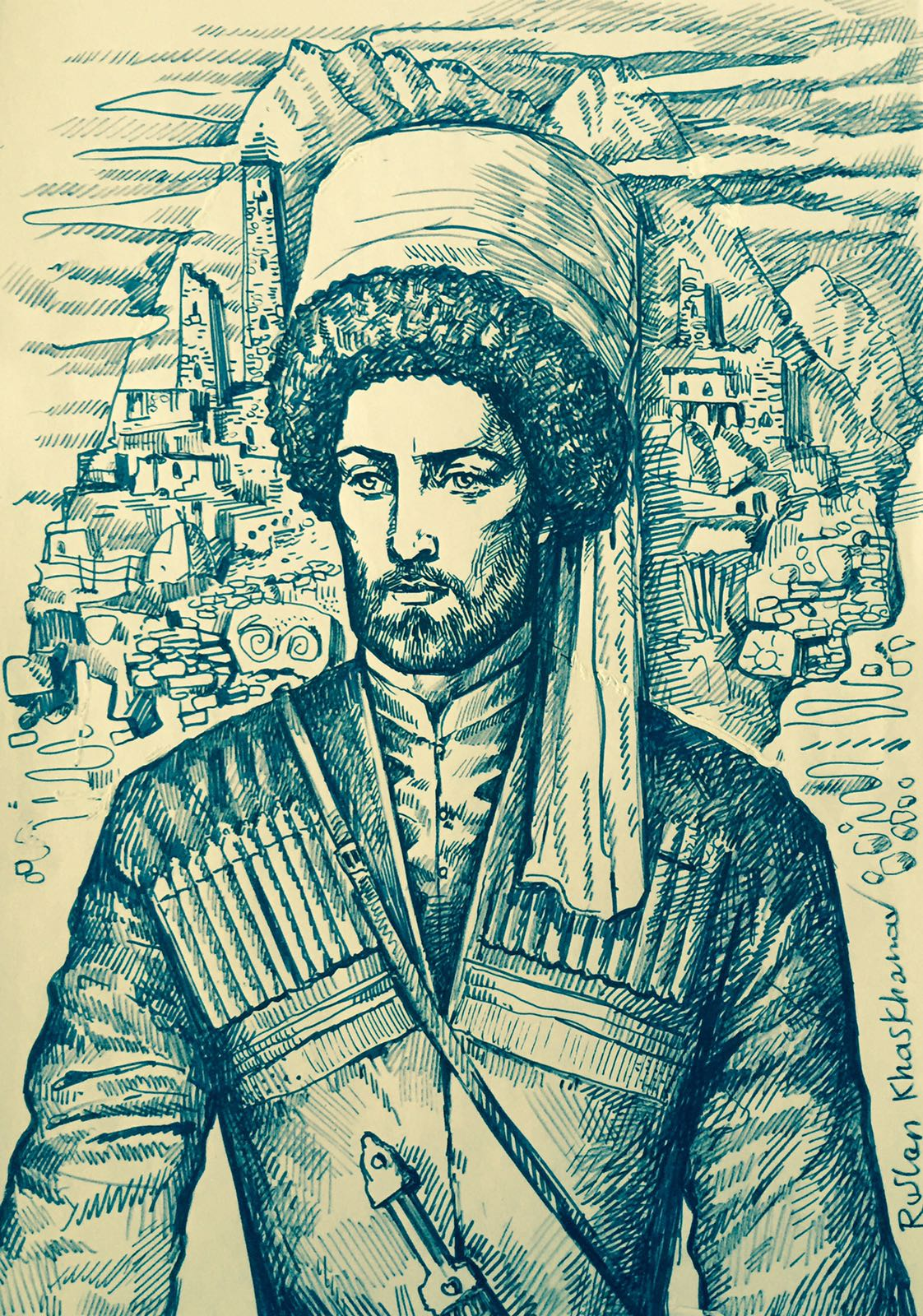
Sheikh Mansur

- Aguk Shagin, 8th-century Chechen commander from Aukh, participant in the Arab–Khazar wars on the side of the Khazar Khaganate
- Aldaman Gheza, elected leader of Chechnya in the 17th century, protected the Chechen borders against several foreign invasions
- Sheikh Mansur, led the resistance against Catherine the Great's imperialist expansion into the Caucasus during the late 18th century
- Bey-Bulat Taymiev, Chechen military leader and diplomat
- Isa Gendargeno, Chechen military leader during the Russo-Caucasian War
- Gubash of Gukhoy, Chechen elder who was known for being anti Caucasian Imamate
- Baysangur of Benoa, Chechen governor and military leader
- Uma Duyev, Chechen military leader during the Russo-Caucasian War. Leader of the uprisings in Chechnya in 1860–1861 and 1877
- Alexander Chechenskiy, Russian major general and participant in the Napoleonic wars
- Talkhig of Shali, governor of the province of Shali in the Caucasian Imamate
- Tovbolat Kurchaloevsky, Chechen abrek
- Shuaib-Mulla of Tsentara, commander in the Caucasian War
- Zelimkhan, legendary Chechen folk hero and abrek

=== World War II ===
- Kanti Abdurakhmanov, Red Army master sergeant, Hero of the Russian Federation
- Dasha Akayev, commander of the 35th Assault Aviation Regiment; also was the first Chechen pilot
- Mahmud Amayev, Soviet junior sergeant and sniper
- Irbaykhan Baybulatov, Red Army battalion commander, Hero of the Soviet Union
- Khansultan Dachiev, Red army Junior lieutenant and Hero of the Soviet Union
- Duda Enginoev, full bearer of the Order of Glory
- Abukhadzhi Idrisov, Red army machine gunner and sniper, Hero of the Soviet Union
- Khasan Israilov, leader of the 1940–1944 uprising against Soviet rule
- Khavazi Muhamed-Mirzaev, Red army senior sergeant and Hero of the Soviet Union
- Khanpasha Nuradilov, highest scoring machine gunner of the Red Army, Hero of the Soviet Union
- Lyalya Nasukhanova, the first Chechen woman pilot and the first Soviet woman to command a fighter jet echelon
- Mairbek Sheripov, prominent leader in the 1940–1944 insurgency against Soviet rule
- Movldi Umarov, Red army lieutenant and Hero of the Russian Federation
- Movlid Visaitov, commander of 255th Chechen-Ingush Cavalry Regiment, and the first one to shake hands with Americans on Elbe river; posthumous Hero of the Soviet Union

=== Chechen-Russian war period and after ===
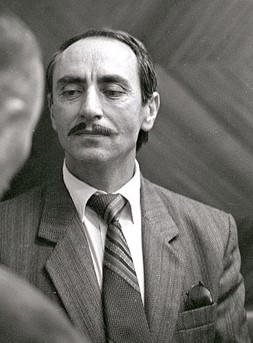
Dzhokhar Dudayev

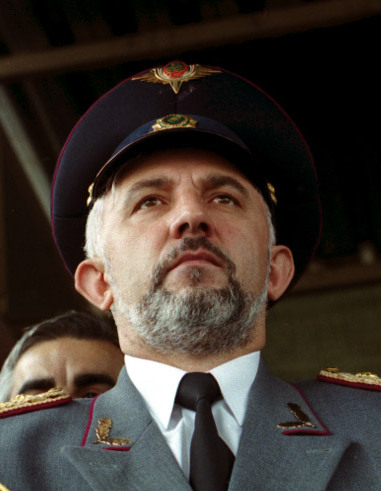
Aslan Maskhadov

- Arbi Barayev, nicknamed "The Terminator", founder and first leader of the Special Purpose Islamic Regiment
- Movsar Barayev, militia leader during the Second Chechen War, who led seizure of Moscow theater that led to deaths of 170 people
- Shamil Basayev, militant Islamist and participant of the Chechen resistance movement
- Dzhokhar Dudayev, Soviet Air Force general and Chechen leader, first President of the Chechen Republic of Ichkeria
- Zelimkhan Yandarbiyev, writer and a politician, served as acting president of the breakaway Chechen Republic of Ichkeria between 1996 and 1997
- Ruslan Gelayev, commander in the Chechen separatist movement
- Aslan Maskhadov, leader of the Chechen separatist movement and the third President of the Chechen Republic of Ichkeria
- Abdul-Halim Sadulayev, fourth President of the Chechen Republic of Ichkeria
- Mairebek Mamedov, nicknamed "The Sniper", Best Sniper of the Chechen Republic of Ichkeria
- Aslan Makhmudov, Hero of the Chechen Republic of Ichkeria

=== Diaspora ===
- Ahmad Aladdin, Jordanian Major general, two time Hero of Jordan
- Mümtaz Çeçen, Ottoman officer
- Ahmad Ramzi, general in the Jordanian Armed forces, minister of interior of Jordan, he was also a friend of the first Jordanian King
- Mahmud Shevket, Ottoman Grand vizier known for the founding of the Ottoman airforce
- Muhammed Bashir Ismail ash-Shishani, major general in the Jordanian Army, former minister of Agriculture, mayor of Amman and director of Military intelligence

== Politicians ==
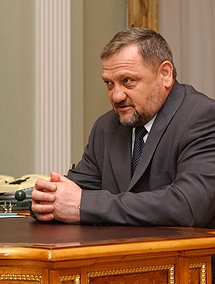
Akhmad Kadyrov

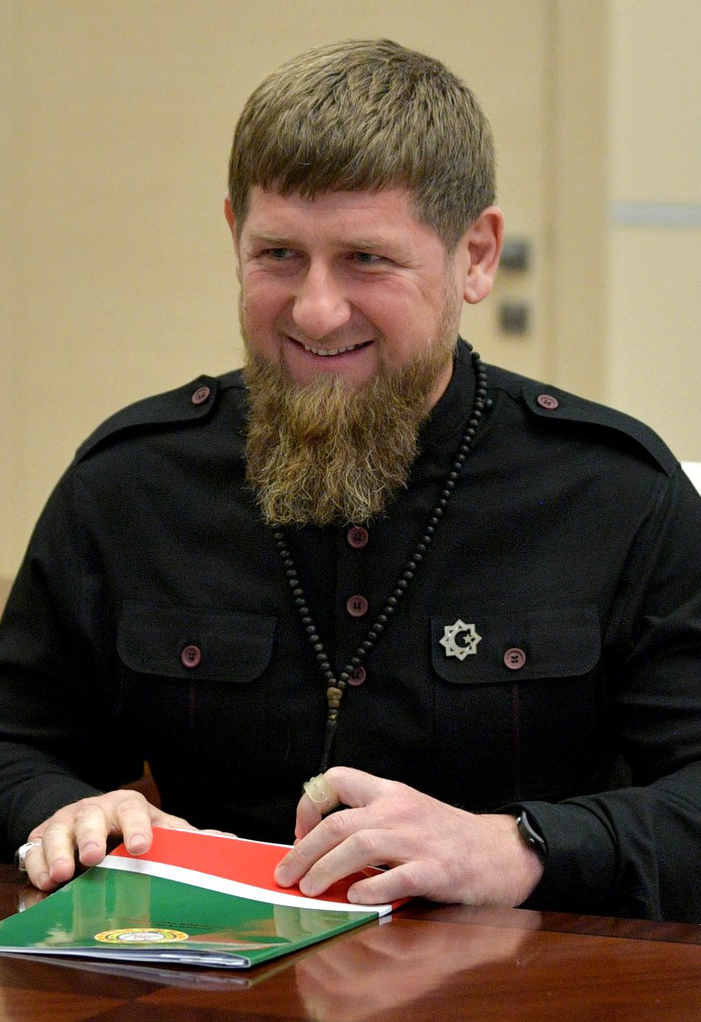
Ramzan Kadyrov

=== Soviet Union ===
- Ruslan Khasbulatov, Speaker of the RSFSR Supreme Soviet, 1991–1993
- Doku Zavgayev, Russian ambassador to Slovenia

=== Russian Federation ===
- Alu Alkhanov, Russian politician, former president of Russia's Chechen Republic
- Vladislav Surkov, Businessman and Politician, former advisor to the President of Russia
- Ramzan Kadyrov, Head of the Chechen Republic
- Akhmad Kadyrov, First president of the Pro-Russian Chechen republic

=== Chechen Republic of Ichkeria ===
- Ilyas Akhmadov, former foreign minister of the Chechen Republic of Ichkeria
- Akhmed Zakayev, leader and prime minister of the Chechen Republic of Ichkeria

=== Diaspora ===
- Abdul Baqi Jammoh

== Business ==
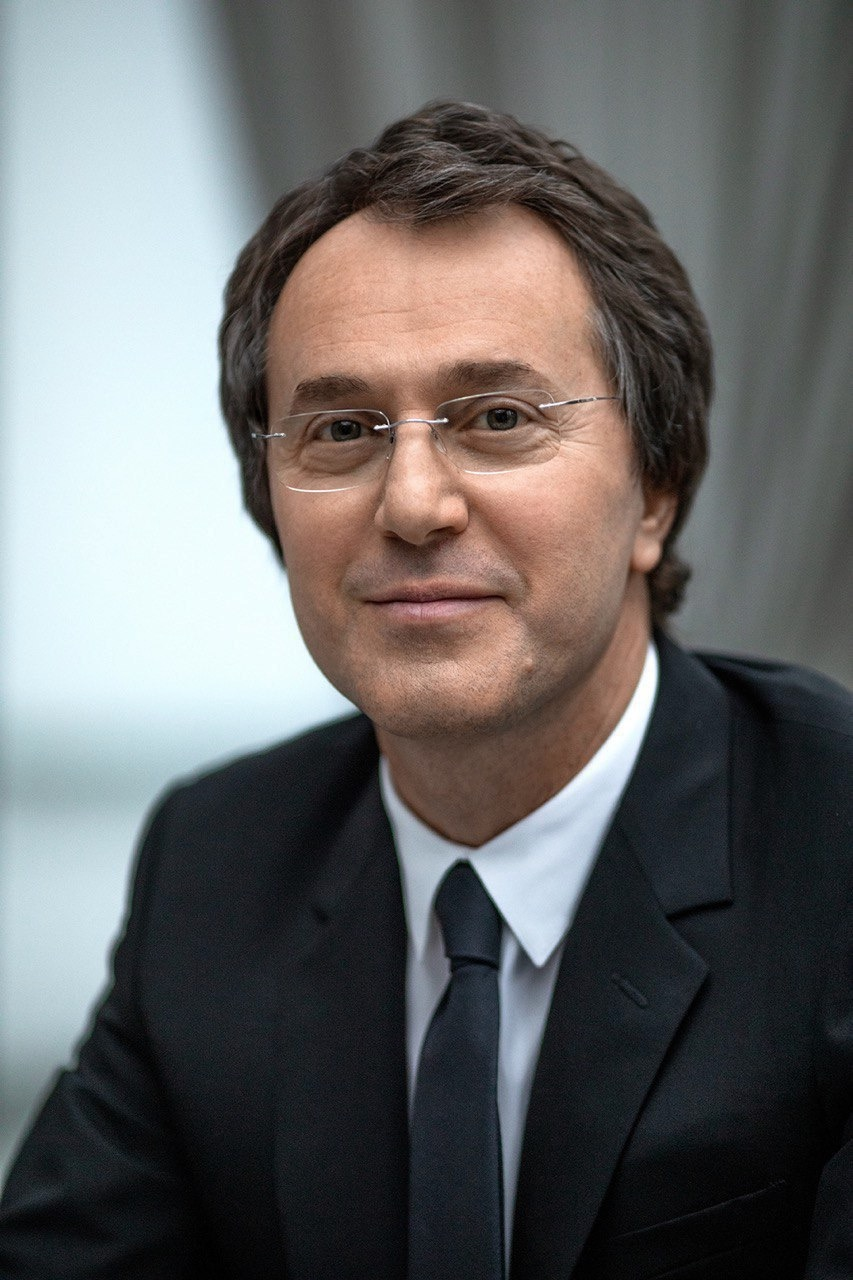
Ruslan Baisarov

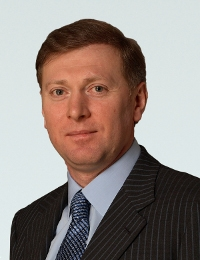
Musa Bazhaev

- Ruslan Baisarov, Chechen entrepreneur and businessman
- Musa Bazhaev, president of Alliance Group
- Malik Saidulaev, businessman and politician
- Tapa Tchermoeff, politician and oil magnate
- Ziya Bazhayev, founder of Alliance group and a philanthropist
- Umar Dzhabrailov, businessman and politician

== Sports ==
=== Footballers ===
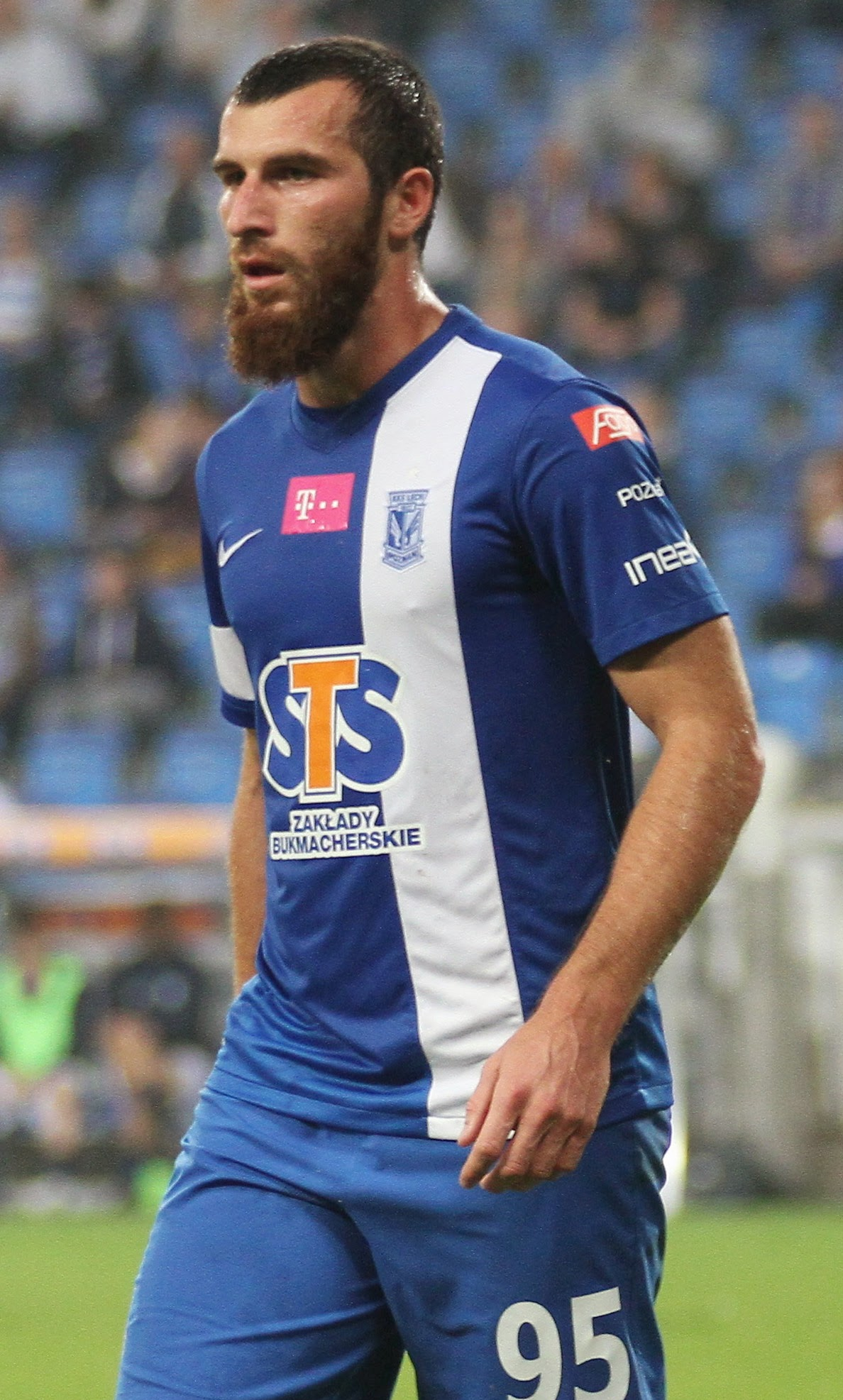
Zaur Sadayev

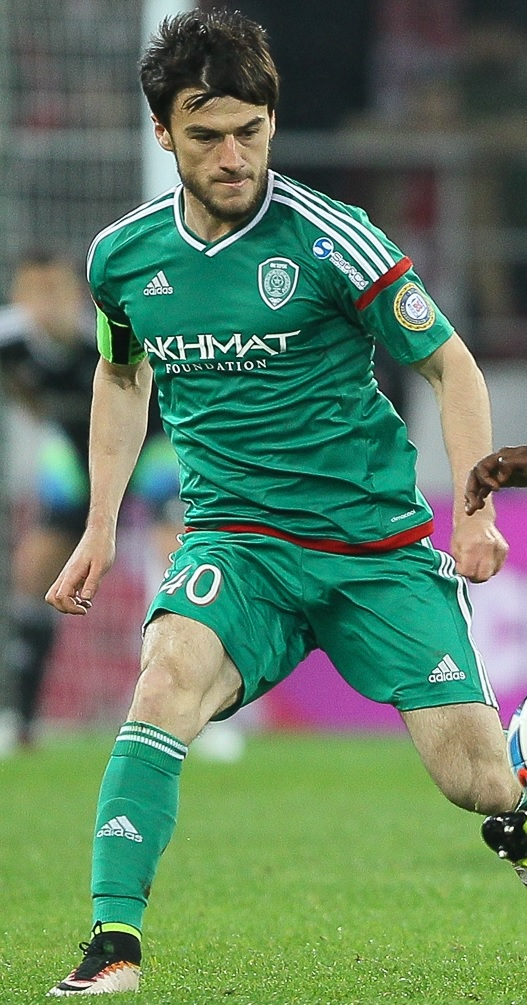
Rizvan Utsiyev

- Zaur Sadayev, former professional footballer who played as an attacking midfielder for Turkish club Ankaragücü
- Dzhabrail Kadiyev, former professional footballer
- Adlan Katsayev, former professional footballer who played as an attacking midfielder
- Magomed Mitrishev, former professional footballer who played as a striker, attacking midfielder and winger for FC Akhmat Grozny
- Khalid Kadyrov, left winger who played for the Russian Premier League team FC Akhmat Grozny
- Rizvan Utsiyev, captain of FC Akhmat Grozny
- Lechi Sadulayev, plays for FC Akhmat Grozny
- Mohammad Omar Shishani, striker for Al-Faisaly
- Murad Tagilov, former professional footballer
- Sergei Tashuyev, currently a coach, he is of Chechen and Belarusian descent
- Rassambek Akhmatov, Chechen football player from France

=== Wrestlers ===
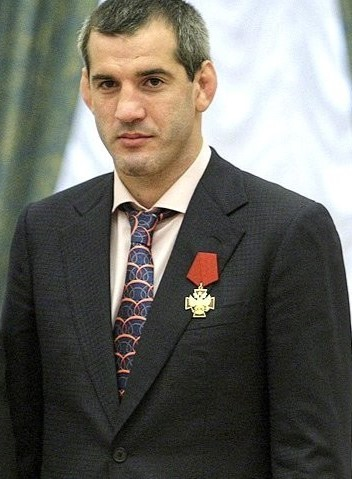
Buvaisar Saitiev

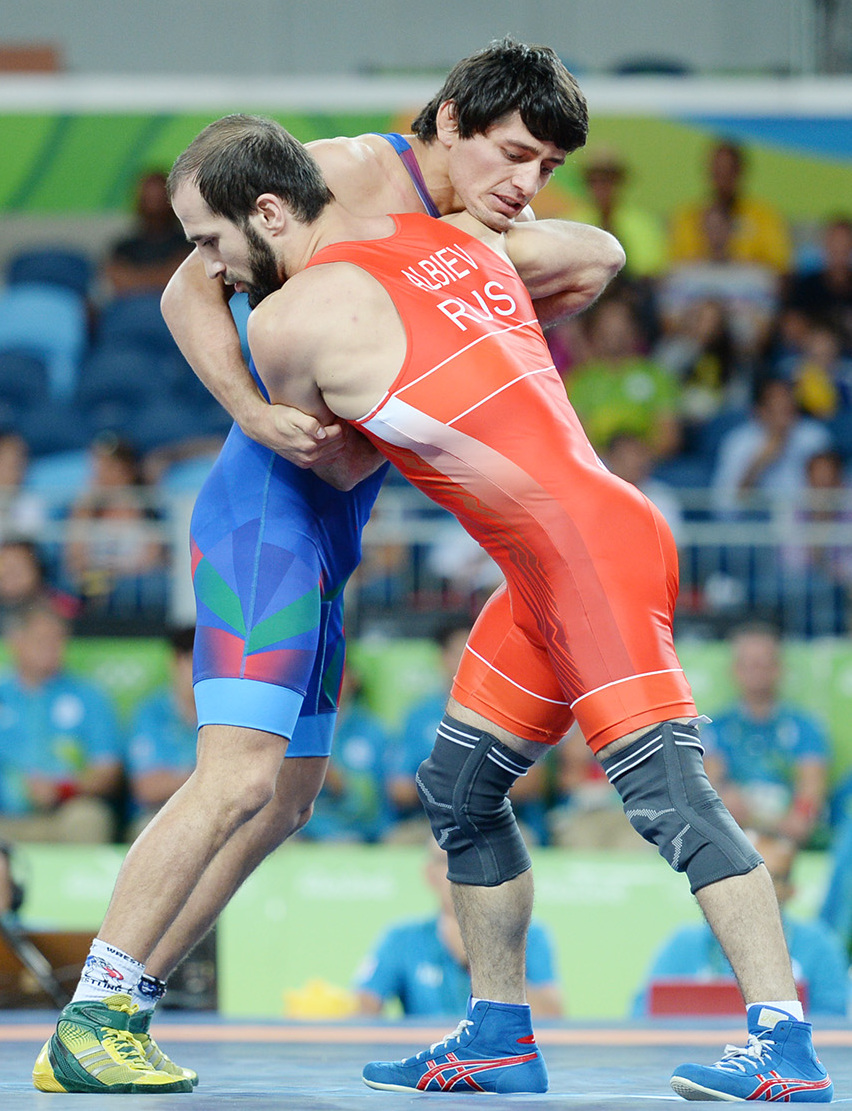
Islambek Albiev (Right)

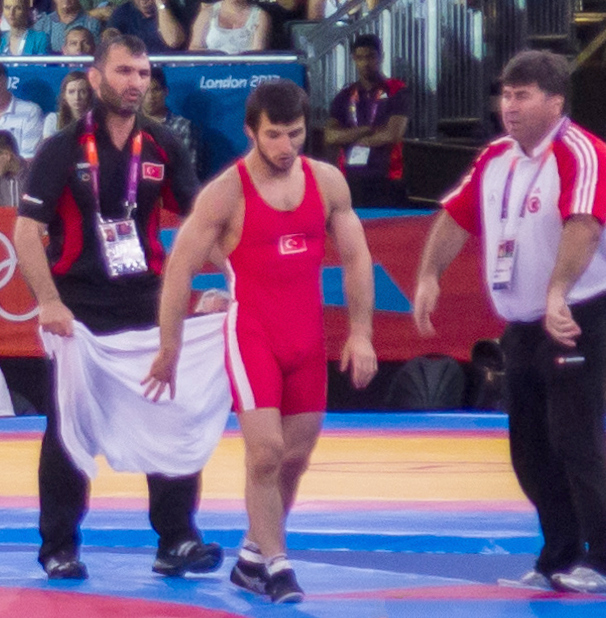
Ramazan Şahin

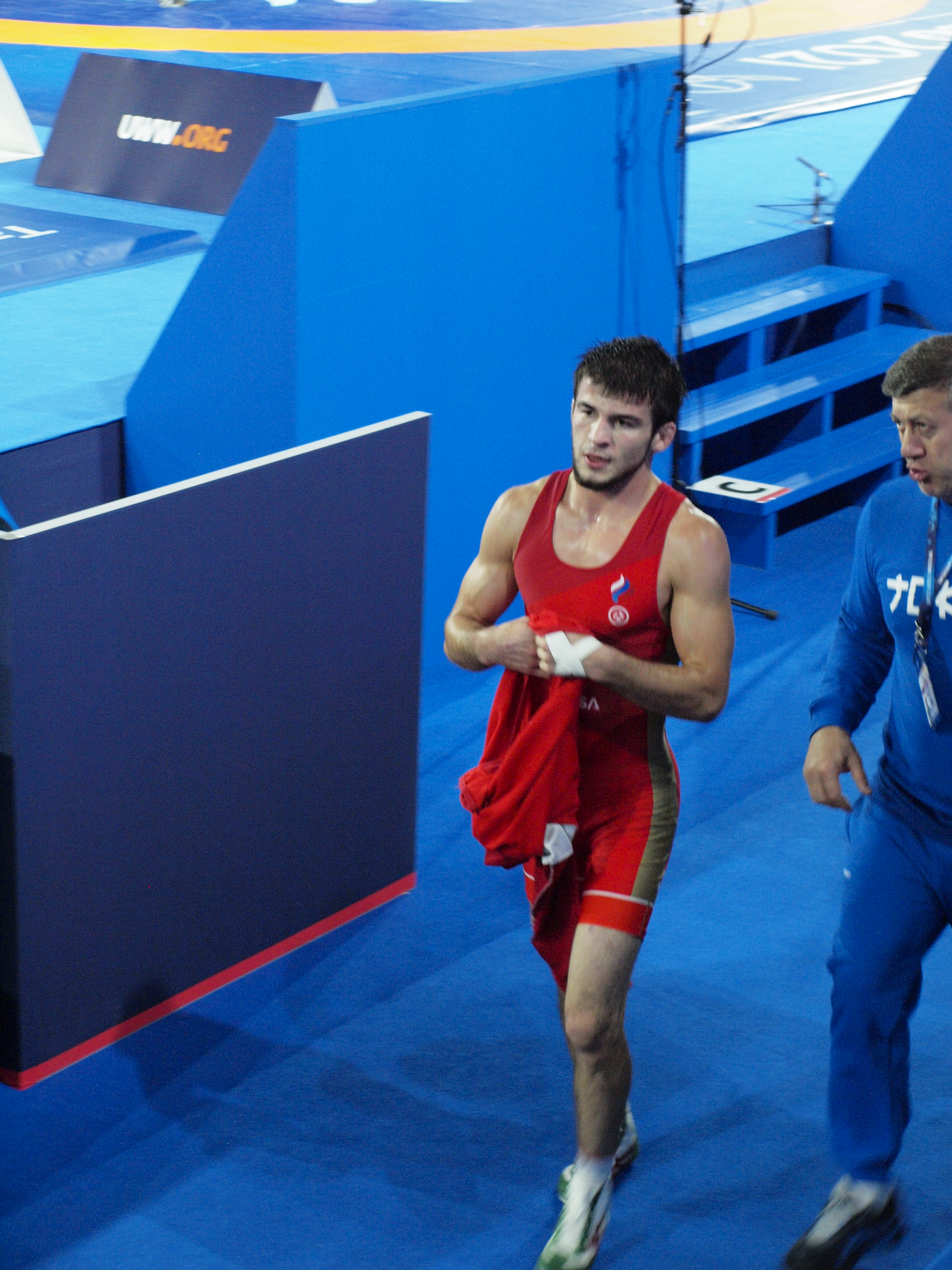
Zagir Shakhiev

- Islambek Albiev, Russian wrestler, a gold medalist at the 2008 Summer Olympics in Greco-Roman wrestling
- Buvaisar Saitiev, Russian wrestler of Chechen heritage, he is a six-time world champion and a three-time Olympic gold medalist in freestyle wrestling
- Adam Saitiev, wrestler, a gold medalist at the 2000 Summer Olympics
- Dzhamal Otarsultanov, wrestler, won the gold medal in men's freestyle 55 kg at the 2012 Summer Olympics
- Razambek Zhamalov, wrestler, won the gold medal in men's freestyle 74 kg at the 2024 Summer Olympics
- Anzor Boltukaev, accomplished wrestler, beat Kyle Snyder in 2016
- Albert Saritov, bronze medalist of the 2016 Olympics
- Adlan Varayev, freestyle wrestler, won a silver medal at the 1988 Olympics
- Rasul Dzhukayev, won a silver medal in the 66 kg division at the 2009 FILA World Championships
- Bekkhan Goygereyev, freestyle wrestler, won the gold medal at the 2013 World Wrestling Championships
- Salman Hashimikov, freestyle wrestler, won two European and four World Championship gold medals in freestyle wrestling (1979, 1981, 1982, 1983)
- Bekhan Tungaev, wrestler who won the European championship back in the 1970s
- Elmadi Zhabrailov, won silver in freestyle wrestling at the 1992 Summer Olympics
- Chingiz Labazanov, Greco-Roman wrestler and world gold medal holder
- Ramazan Şahin, a gold medalist in freestyle wrestling at the 2008 Summer Olympics
- Zelimkhan Huseynov, silver medalist at the 2009 World Wrestling Championships
- Lukman Zhabrailov, gold medalist at the 1994 World Wrestling Championships
- Zagir Shakhiev, gold medalist at the 2021 World Wrestling Championships
- Akhmed Chakaev, two time bronze medalist at the World Wrestling Championships
- Alikhan Zhabrailov, bronze medalist at the 2019 World Wrestling Championships
- Roland Schwarz, bronze medalist at the 2021 World Wrestling Championships

=== Boxers ===
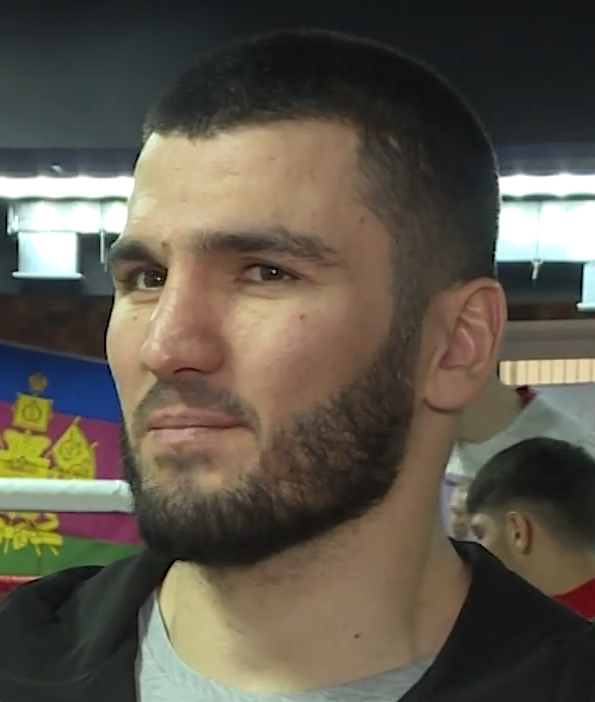
Artur Beterbiev

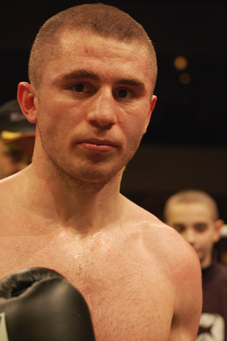
Zaurbek Baysangurov

- Artur Beterbiev, Unified light-heavyweight boxing champion
- Umar Salamov, professional boxer who held the IBO light-heavyweight title in 2016
- Zaurbek Baysangurov, professional boxer and former WBO and IBO light middleweight champion
- Khuseyn Baysangurov, professional boxer who held the WBA Continental (Europe) and the IBF International light-middleweight titles from 2017 to 2018
- Apti Davtaev, professional boxer
- Imam Khataev, Tokyo 2020 bronze medalist
- Arthur Biyarslanov, professional boxer

=== Mixed martial artists ===
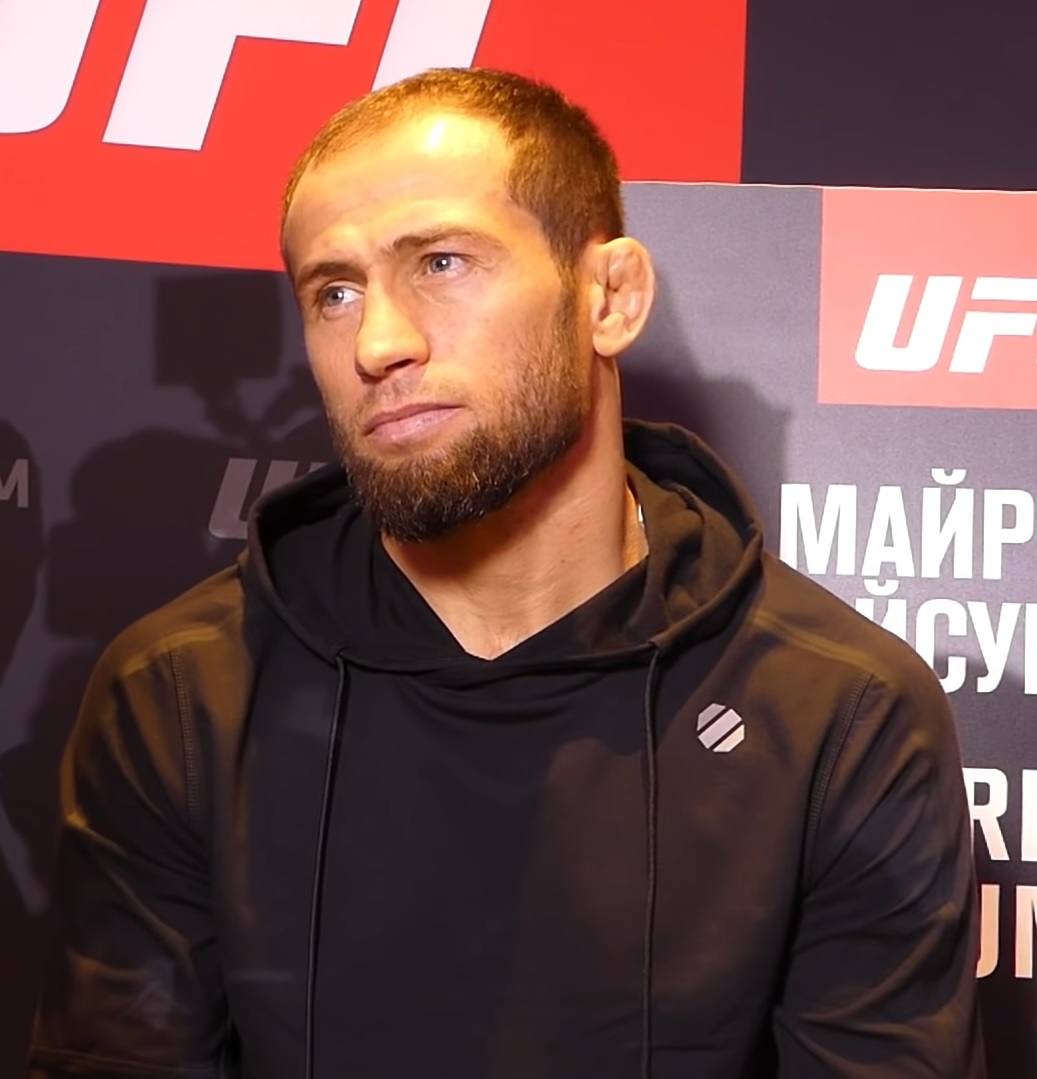
Mairbek Taisumov

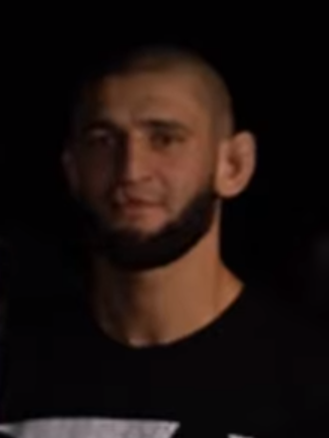
Khamzat Chimaev

- Adlan Amagov, formerly competed in the UFC, where he is the first Chechen mixed martial artist to compete
- Mamed Khalidov, currently competing in the KSW
- Mairbek Taisumov, formerly competed in the UFC
- Zubaira Tukhugov, formerly competed in the UFC
- Ismail Naurdiev, currently competing in the UFC
- Khamzat Chimaev, former UFC Middleweight Champion
- Islam Dulatov, currently competing in the UFC

=== Weightlifters ===
- Apti Aukhadov, weightlifter, 2013 World Champion and silver medalist at the 2012 Summer Olympics

=== Judo practitioners ===
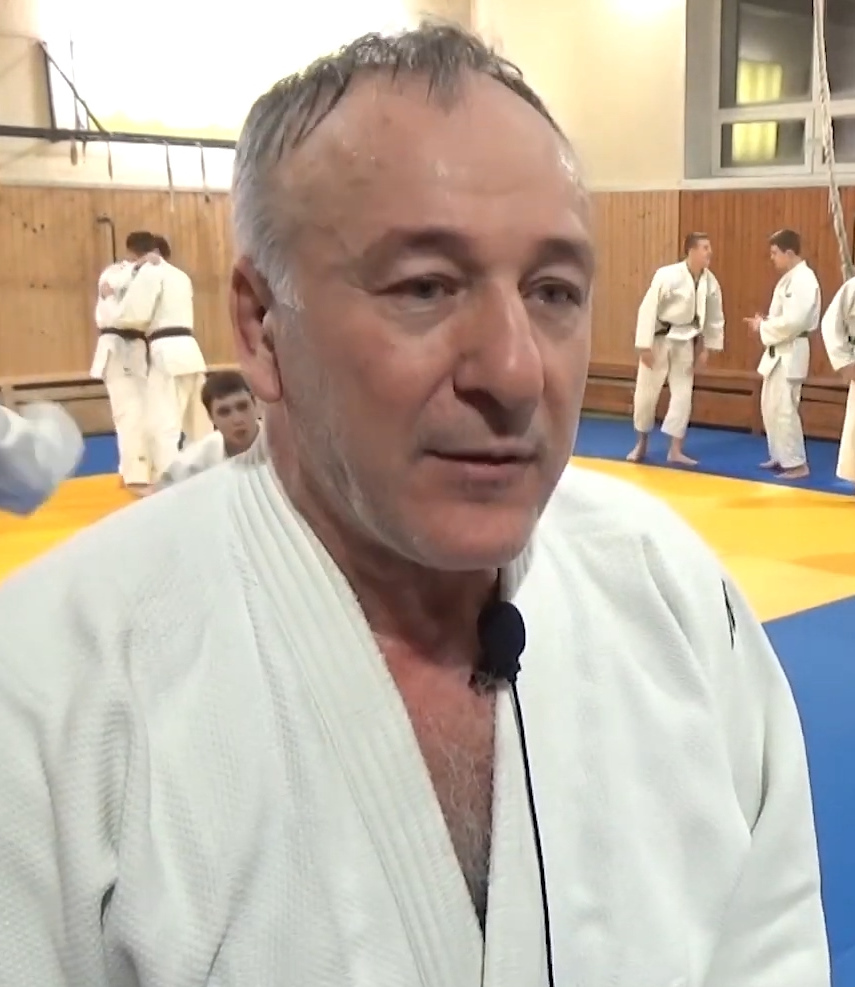
Bashir Varaev

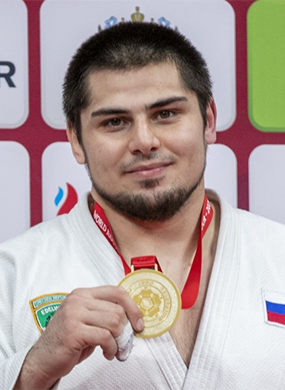
Tamerlan Bashaev

- Hüseyin Özkan, gold medalist at the 2000 Summer Olympics
- Bashir Varaev, bronze medalist at the 1988 Summer Olympics
- Shamil Borchashvili, Tokyo 2020 Olympics bronze medalist
- Tamerlan Bashaev, Tokyo 2020 Olympics bronze medalist
- Yakub Shamilov, bronze medalist at the 2021 World Judo Championships
- Salamu Mezhidov, 2007 european champion
- Islam Matsiev
- Bektaş Demirel
- German Abdulaev
- David Margoshvili

== Musicians and dancers ==
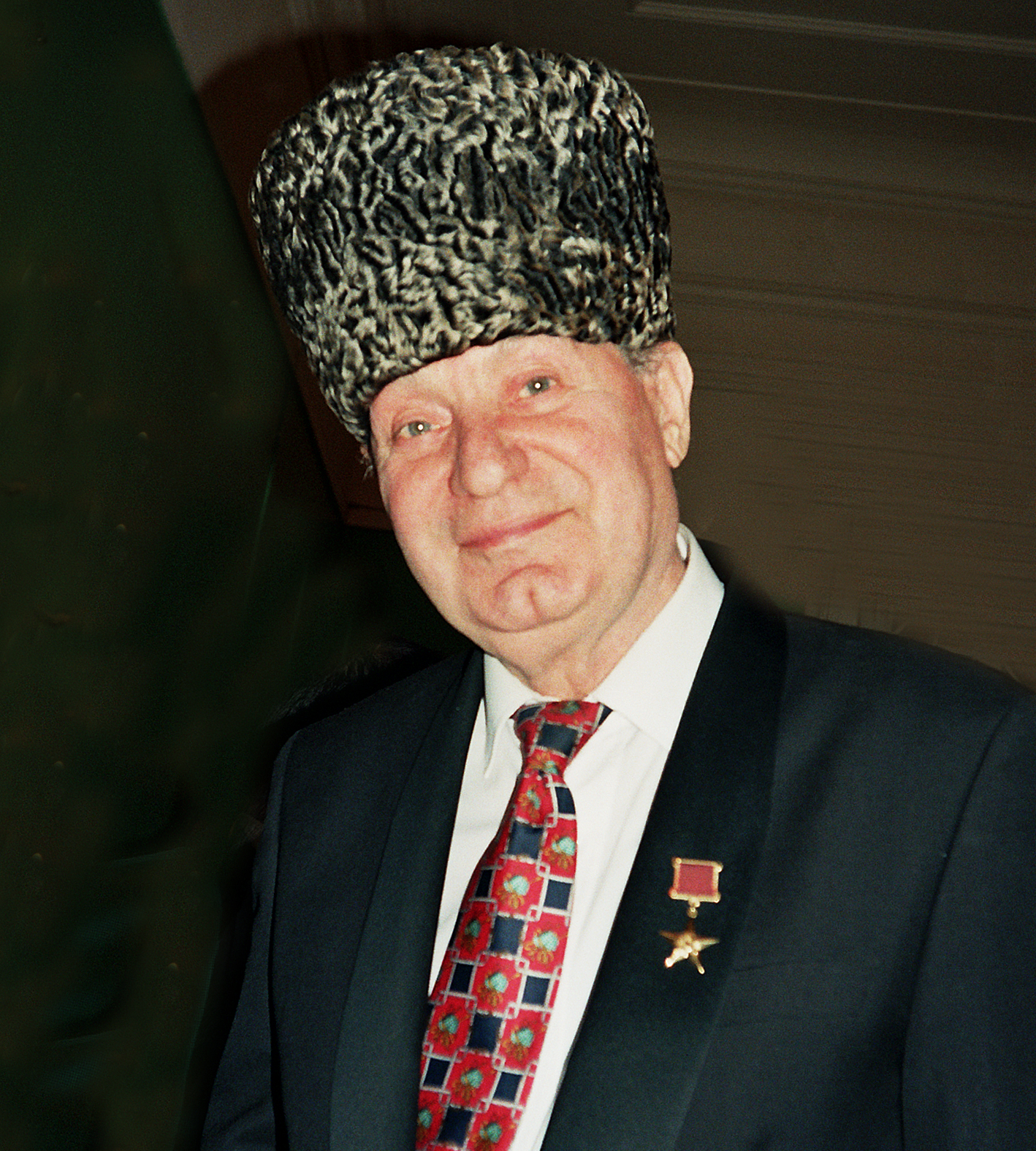
Makhmud Esambayev

- Said Dimayev, orchestral music composer
- Umar Dimayev, accordionist and folk music composer
- Ali Dimayev, musician and composer
- Sultan Islamov, actor and singer
- Timur Mutsurayev, musician and bard
- Makka Sagaipova, popular singer
- Xava Tashaeva, popular singer
- Makhmud Esambayev, actor and dancer, was regarded as one of the most famous dancers of the Soviet Union
- Imran Usmanov, folk singer
- Ramzan Paskayev, accordionist and folk musician
- Imam Alimsultanov, folk singer
- Aza Bataeva, pop singer
- Liza Umarova, singer and actress

== Writers and poets ==
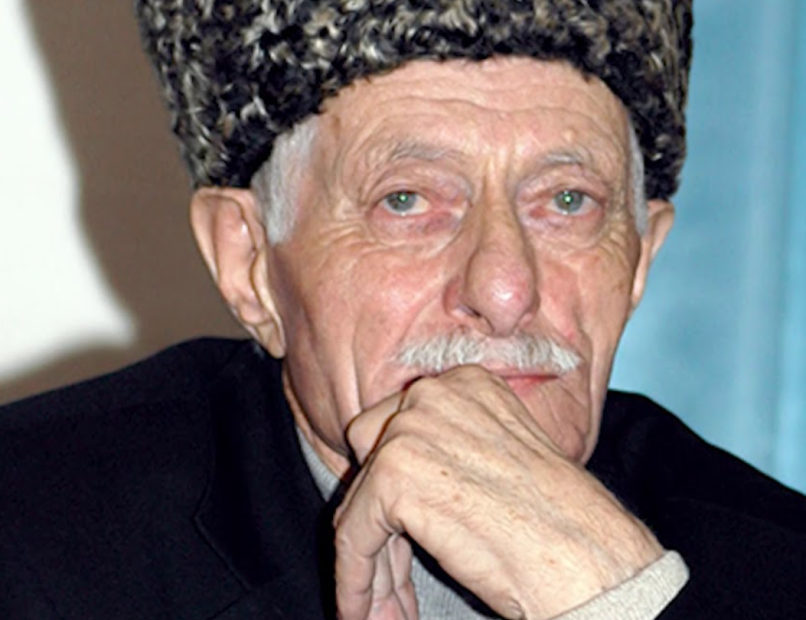
Abuzar Aydamirov

=== Writers ===
- Azdeen Vazar, writer and historian
- Musa Geshaev, writer
- Abuzar Aydamirov, novelist and poet
- Abdurakhman Avtorkhanov, Chechen historian of the communist period

=== Poets ===
- Magomet Mamakaev, one of the founders of modern Chechen literature
- Raisa Akhmatova, poet
- Yamlikhan Khasbulatov, writer and poet. Brother of Ruslan Khasbulatov

== Scientists ==
=== Historians ===
- Ibragim-Bek Sarakaev, writer and historian
- Khozh-Akhmed Bersanov, ethnographer and author
- Aslanbek Khasbulatov, historian and director at University of Grozny, brother of Ruslan Khasbulatov
- Zulay Khasbulatova, ethnographer and historian, sister of Ruslan Khasbulatov
- Dalkhan Khozhaev, historian and field commander
- Khasan Bakayev, historian and writer

=== Physicist ===
- Akhmed Tsebiev, Physicist and inventor

== Medicine ==
=== Surgeons ===
- Khassan Baiev, Chechen-American trauma surgeon

== Activists and journalists ==
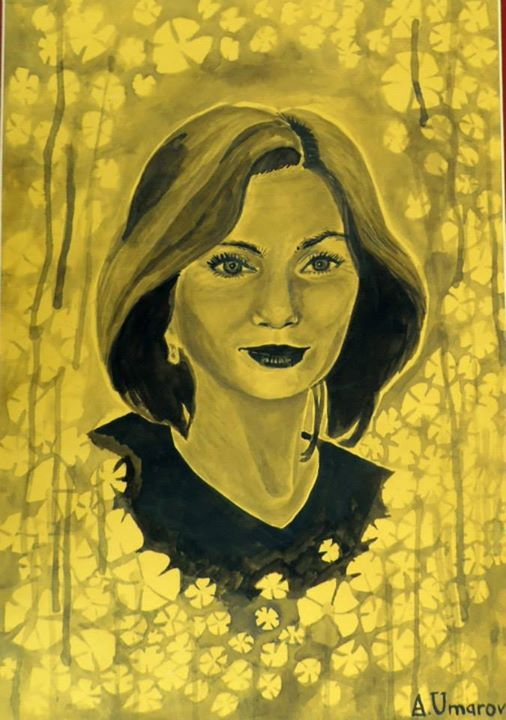
Natalya Estemirova

- Natalya Estemirova, human rights activist
- Salavdi Gugaev, activist for the rehabilitation of Chechens from Aardakh
- Oyub Titiev, human rights activist
- Hadijat Gatayeva, humanitarian activist and nurse
- Amina Okueva, deceased Euromaidan activist and soldier in the Russo-Ukrainian war

=== Journalists ===
- Musa Muradov, journalist
- Milana Bakhaeva (pen name Terloeva), journalist and author
- Adlan Khasanov, photographer and journalist

== Artists and painters ==
- Pyotr Zakharov-Chechenets, first professional painter of Chechen origin
- Aslan Goisum, contemporary artist

== Others ==
- Ruslan Labazanov, mob boss who disappeared in 1996
