= Ramzan Paskayev =

Kazakh-Chechen musician (born 1947)

Ramzan Paskayev Рамзан Паскаев
- Birth name: Ramzan Paskayev
- Born: March 16, 1947 (age 78)
- Origin: Taraz, Kazakh Soviet Socialist Republic, Soviet Union
- Genres: Music of Chechnya, Folk music
- Occupation(s): Accordionist, Composer
- Instrument: Accordion
- Years active: 1960–

Ramzan Paskayev (Chechen: Рамзан Паскаев) (born March 16, 1947, in Taraz, Kazakhstan) is a Chechen accordionist and folk musician. He is regarded by many as the contemporary successor to late Chechen accordionist Umar Dimayev.

== Biography ==
Paskayev was born in Taraz to Chechen parents on March 16, 1947. His family been sent to Kazakhstan as a result of the forced deportations of the Chechens and Ingush to Central Asia on February 23, 1944. Ramzan's father Sultan worked as a truck driver and gathered wheat on a collective farm to help support his family. Sultan had managed to bring a German accordion from his home in Chechnya, and during evenings the young Ramzan would constantly bother his father to play the accordion out of curiosity.

However, Paskayev recalls that the greatest influence on his career would be the songs of the legendary Chechen accordionist Umar Dimayev: Umar had managed to perform on radio stations in Kazakhstan, and although the radio transmissions would last barely fifteen minutes, the exiled Chechens would gather at the homes of radio owners to listen to Umar's broadcasts. His folk songs reminded the Chechen people of their lost homeland, which the bereaved Chechens longed to return to. At the end of the transmission, the men would hide their wet eyes, and the mothers cried quietly. Ramzan would later speak of Dimayev's music: "They were philosophical tones. Nothing like it in the Chechen folk art exists. Umar Dimayev remained an unbeatable virtuoso. That was the time when I had developed a strong desire to become like Dimayev. Now I realize that no one can match him."

By the mid-1950s, De-Stalinization had allowed the Chechens and Ingush to return to their native homelands, and the Paskayev family moved to Grozny, the Chechen capital. Throughout his youth, Ramzan had developed his musical abilities, and in 1960 the young Ramzan was invited into the House of Folklore amateur ensemble. He worked in the ensemble writing melodies, and had decided to receive a vocational education from that group. Also during his youth, Ramzan met with his idol, Umar Dimayev: Dimayev handed Ramzan his accordion, and although Ramzan's feet couldn't yet touch the ground when he sat on his chair, Ramzan surprised the entire audience with his small performance. Umar declared, "He will inevitably become an accordionist." From their encounter, Ramzan later recalled, "His face showed a gracious smile. I think he had realized that I had copied his style."

In 1962 Paskayev was invited to speak at Baikal TV, and after delivering his speech he became widely known throughout the Chechen-Ingush ASSR. He spent much of his youth performing with adults, and wasn't seen playing with other children. That year he also performed at the Great Kremlin Palace and met with Soviet leader Nikita Khrushchev. The following year, Ramzan was also invited into the "Vaynah" dance ensemble.

In 1967 Paskayev was called to active duty in the ranks of the Soviet Red Army. However, he was transferred to a military garrison ensemble after the intervention of fellow musician Aslan Gugiev. Afterwards Ramzan would enroll in a professional education at a college in Grozny and then the Krasnodar Institute of Culture. He would join an orchestra, and work there until 1983, when he would return to "Vaynah".

With the start of the First Chechen War, Paskayev would move with his family to Moscow. He later commented, "I moved to Moscow from despair. Here, my creativity has become a facelift. As an adult, I became aware that the music is the foundation of our people. Without music, life is impossible. It must rally people to help us live and build. Living in Moscow, I issued six discs. And I realized that was responsible for our musical heritage. Folk art is a very serious genre, and it must be handled with care. During the war years, we lost all music. Many unique records were destroyed, which had its historical value. They simply burned, crushed. It is necessary to restore and re-write the wealth of musical collection that we had."

Ramzan Paskayev is highly regarded by many Chechens for his ability to remember countless Chechen folk tunes by heart, which are regarded as the cornerstone of the restoration of Chechen music. He had groomed his son Ruslan, also a talented accordionist, to follow in his footsteps, but on October 12, 2004, Ruslan, a university student in Grozny, was found dead in the nearby village of Kalinina. His corpse showed signs of blows and tortures, and he had been shot in the head. Ruslan's murder was touted as another example of extrajudicial execution by Russian forces.

Currently, Paskayev writes music, and was assisted by the late Said Dimayev. His works are included in the repertoires of orchestras in Dagestan, Kabardino-Balkaria, and North Ossetia, and is regarded as one of the best musicians of Chechnya.
