= Anthem of the Chechen Republic of Ichkeria =

Joƶalla ya marşo
English: Death or Freedom
- Ӏожалла йа маршо
- Coat of arms of the Chechen Republic of Ichkeria
- Regional anthem of Chechen Republic of Ichkeria
- Lyrics: Abuzar Aydamirov
- Music: Ali Dimayev or Umar Beksultanov
- Adopted: 1991
- Preceded by: "My Checheno-Ingushetia"
- Succeeded by: State Anthem of the Chechen Republic

Audio sample
- Audio recording of the anthem by Imam Alimsultanov: file; help

"Death or Freedom" (Note: Chechen: Ӏожалла йа маршо, romanized: Joƶalla ya marşo, pronounced [ˈʡɔːʒəɫːə jə ˈmɑːrʃʷɔː]; Russian: Свобода или смерть, romanized: Svoboda ili smertj) is a Chechen patriotic song which served as the national anthem of the Chechen Republic of Ichkeria—a former partially recognized separatist state in the North Caucasus, used between 1991 and 2000. The music was composed in 1991 by either Ali Dimayev or Umar Beksultanov, and the lyrics were written by Abuzar Aydamirov.

The Dudayev-era anthem replaced "My Checheno-Ingushetia", the anthem of the Checheno-Ingush Autonomous Soviet Socialist Republic, following the dissolution of the Soviet Union. Afterwards, "Death or Freedom" was officially replaced by the Kadyrov-era anthem.

== Lyrics ==
=== Chechen original ===
Cyrillic script

Буьйсанна борз ехкаш дуьненчу доьвлла тхо,
Ӏуьйранна лом угӀуш тхан цӀераш техкина.
ЛаилахӀа иллАллахӀ.
𝄆 Аьрзонийн баннашкахь наноша дакхийна,
Тархаш тӀехь дой хьийзон дайша тхо Ӏамийна.
ЛаилахӀа иллАллахӀ. 𝄇

Халкъана, махкана наноша кхоьллина,
Цаьршинна эшначохь, майра дӀахӀиттина.
ЛаилахӀа иллАллахӀ.
𝄆 Ламанан лечарчий маршонехь кхиийна,
Халонех, бохамех курра чекхдийлина.
ЛаилахӀа иллАллахӀ. 𝄇

Мокхазан ламанаш даш хилла лаларах,
Дахарехь, къийсамехь йахь оха дӀалур йац!
ЛаилахӀа иллАллахӀ.
𝄆 Бос Ӏаьржа ва латта молханах лелхарах,
Тхешан сий доьхкина, тхо лаьтта доьрзур дац.
ЛаилахӀа иллАллахӀ. 𝄇

Тхо цкъа а цхьанненна къарделла совцур дац,
«Ӏожалла, йа маршо» — шиннех цхьаъ йоккхур йу?
ЛаилахӀа иллАллахӀ.
𝄆 Йижараша тхан чоьвнаш эшаршца ерзайо,
Хьомсарчу бӀаьргаша хьуьнаршна гӀиттадо.
ЛаилахӀа иллАллахӀ. 𝄇

Мацалло хьовзадахь, орамаш дуур ду,
Хьогалло тхаш бӀарздахь, бецан тхи мийр ду!
ЛаилахӀа иллАллахӀ.
𝄆 Буьйсанна борз ехкаш дуьненчу доьвлла ду,
Халкъана, махкана, Далла а муьтӀахь ду,
ЛаилахӀа иллАллахӀ! 𝄇

Latin script

Büysanna borz yexkaş dünençu dövlla txo,
Jüyranna lom uġuş txan ċeraş texkina.
Lailaha illAllah.
𝄆 Ärzoniyn bannaşkaẋ nanoşa daqiyna,
Tarxaş theẋ doy ẋiyzon dayşa txo jamiyna.
Lailaha illAllah. 𝄇

Xalq̇ana, maxkana nanoşa qöllina,
Cärşinna eşnaçoẋ, mayra djahittina.
Lailaha illAllah.
𝄆 Lamanan leçarçiy marşoneẋ qiiyna,
Xalonex, boxamex kurra çeqdiylina.
Lailaha illAllah. 𝄇

Moqazan lamanaş daş xilla lalarax,
Daxareẋ, q̇iysameẋ yaẋ oẋa djalur yac!
Lailaha illAllah.
𝄆 Bos järƶa va latta molxanax lelxarax,
Txeşan siy döxkina, txo lätta dörzur dac.
Lailaha illAllah. 𝄇

Txo ċq̇a a cẋannenna q̇ardella sovcur dac,
«Joƶalla ya marşo» – şinnex cẋaə yoqqur yu?
Lailaha illAllah.
𝄆 Yiƶaraşa txan çövnaş eşarşca yerzayo,
Ẋomsarçu bjärgaşa ẋünarşna ġittado.
Lailaha illAllah. 𝄇

Macallo ẋovzadaẋ, oramaş duur du,
Ẋogallo txaş bjarzdaẋ, becan txi miyr du!
Lailaha illAllah.
𝄆 Büysanna borz yexkaş dünençu dövlla du,
Xalq̇ana, maxkana, Dalla a müthaẋ du,
Lailaha illAllah! 𝄇

Arabic script

بویسانّا بوٓرز یەخكاش دونەنچو دوٓولّا تخوٓ،
عويرانّا لوٓم اوغوش تخان ڗەراش تەخكینا.
لا إله إلا الله.
𝄆 ارزوٓنیین بانّاشكاح نانوٓشا داقیینا،
تارخاش طەح دوٓی حییزوٓن دایشا تخوٓ عامیینا.
لا إله إلا الله. 𝄇

خالڨانا، ماخكانا نانوٓشا قوٓلّینا،
ر̤ارشینّا اەشناچوٓح، مایرا دعاھیتّینا.
لا إله إلا الله.
𝄆 لامانان لەچارچیی مارشوٓنەح قییینا،
خالوٓنەخ، بوٓخامەخ كورّا چەقدییلینا.
لا إله إلا الله. 𝄇

موٓقازان لاماناش داش خیلّا لالاراخ،
داخارەح، ڨییسامەح یاح اوٓخا دعالور یار̤!
لا إله إلا الله.
𝄆 بوٓس عارجا وا لاتّا موٓلخاناخ لەلخاراخ،
تخەشان سیی دوٓخكینا، تخوٓ لاتّا دوٓرزور دار̤.
لا إله إلا الله. 𝄇

تخوٓ ر̤ڨا آ ر̤حانّەنّا ڨاردەلّا سوٓور̤ور دار̤،
«عوٓجالّا یا مارشوٓ» — شینّەخ ر̤حائ یوٓقّور یو؟
لا إله إلا الله.
𝄆 ییجاراشا تخان چوٓوناش اەشارشر̤ا یەرزایوٓ،
حوٓمسارچو بعارگاشا حونارشنا غیتّادوٓ.
لا إله إلا الله. 𝄇

مار̤الّوٓ حوٓوزاداح، اوٓراماش دوور دو،
حوٓگالّوٓ تخاش بعارزداح، بەر̤ان تخی مییر دو.
لا إله إلا الله.
𝄆 بویسانّا بوٓرز یەخكاش دونەنچو دوٓولّا دو،
خالڨانا، ماخكانا، دالّا آ موطاح دو،
لا إله إلا الله! 𝄇

Georgian script

ბუ̈ჲსანნა ბორზ ჲეხკაშ დუ̈ნენჩუ დო̈ვლლა თხო,
ჺუ̈ჲრანნა ლომ უღუშ თხან წერაშ თეხკანა.
ლაილაჰა ილლ`ალლაჰ.
𝄆 ა̈რზონიჲნ ბანნაშკაჰ’ ნანუშა დაჴიჲნა,
თარხაშ ტეჰ’ დოჲ ჰ’იჲზონ დაჲშა თხო ჺამიჲნა.
ლაილაჰა ილლ`ალლაჰ. 𝄇

ხალყანა, მახქანა ნანუშა ჴო̈ლლინა,
ცა̈რშინნა ეშნაჩოჰ’, მაჲრა დჺაჰითთინა.
ლაილაჰა ილლ`ალლაჰ.
𝄆 ლამანან ლეჩარჩიჲ მარშონეჰ’ ჴიიჲნა,
ხალონეხ, ბოხამეხ კურრა ჩეჴდიჲლინა.
ლაილაჰა ილლ`ალლაჰ. 𝄇

მოჴაზან ლამანაშ დაშ ხილლა ლალარახ,
დახარეჰ’, ყიჲსამეჰ’ ჲაჰ’ ოხა დჺალურ იაც!
ლაილაჰა ილლ`ალლაჰ.
𝄆 ბოს ჺა̈რჟა ვა ლათთა მოლხანახ ლელხარახ,
თხეშან სიჲ დო̈ხკინა, თხო ლა̈თთა დო̈რზურ დაც.
ლაილაჰა ილლ`ალლაჰ. 𝄇

თხო წყა ა ცჰ’ანნენნა ყარდელლა სოვცურ დაც,
ჺოჟალლა ჲა მარშო — შინნეხ ცჰ’აჷ ჲოჴჴურ ჲუ?
ლაილაჰა ილლ`ალლაჰ.
𝄆 იჲჟარაშა თხან ჩო̈ვნაშ ეშარშცა ჲერზაჲო,
ჰ’ომსარჩუ ბჺა̈რგაშა ჰ’უ̈ნარშნა ღითთადო.
ლაილაჰა ილლ`ალლაჰ. 𝄇

მაცალლო ჰ’ოვზადაჰ’, ორამაშ დუურ დუ,
ჰ’ოგალლო თხაშ ბჺარზდაჰ’, ბეცან თხი მიჲრ დუ!
ლაილაჰა ილლ`ალლაჰ.
𝄆 ბუ̈ჲსანნა ბორზ ჲეხკაშ დუ̈ნენჩუ დო̈ვლლა დუ,
ხალყანა, მახქანა, დალლა ა მუ̈ტაჰ დუ,
ლაილაჰა ილლ`ალლაჰ! 𝄇

IPA transcription (Note: See Help:IPA and Chechen phonology.)

[ˈbyː.sə.nːə bʷɔrz ˈjex.kəʃ | ˈdʏ.nʲen.tʃʷʊ ˈdᶣøʏ.ɫːə txʷɔ |]
[ˈʡyː.rə.nːə ɫʷɔm ˈwʊ.ɣʷʊʃ | txə̃ ˈtsʼɛ.rəʃ ˈtɛx.kɪ.nə |]
[ˈɫəɪ.ɫə.hə ˈɪ.ɫːə.ɫːəh ‖]
𝄆 [ˈær.zʷɔ.nĩː ˈbə.nːəʃ.kəʜ | ˈnɑː.nʷɔ.ʃə ˈdə.qiː.nə |]
[ˈtər.xəʃ t’ʲeʜ dʷɔɪ ˈʜiː.zʷɔ̃ː | ˈdəɪ.ʃə txʷɔ ˈʡɑː.miː.nə |]
[ˈɫəɪ.ɫə.hə ˈɪ.ɫːə.ɫːəh ‖] 𝄇

[ˈxəɫ.qʼə.nə ˈməx.kə.nə | ˈnɑː.nʷɔ.ʃə ˈqᶣø.ɫːɪ.nə |]
[ˈtsær.ʃɪ.nːə ˈɛʃ.nə.tʃʷɔʜ | ˈməɪ.rə ˈdˤə.hɪ.tːɪ.nə |]
[ˈɫəɪ.ɫə.hə ˈɪ.ɫːə.ɫːəh ‖]
𝄆 [ˈɫɑː.mə.nə̃ ˈlɛː.tʃər.tʃiː | ˈmər.ʃʷɔː.nʲeʜ ˈqɪ.iː.nə |]
[ˈxə.ɫʷɔː.nʲex ˈbʷɔː.xə.mʲex | ˈkʷʊ.rːə ˈtʃʲеq.diː.ɫɪ.nə |]
[ˈɫəɪ.ɫə.hə ˈɪ.ɫːə.ɫːəh ‖] 𝄇

[ˈmɔː.qə.zə̃ ˈɫɑː.mə.nəʃ | dəʃ ˈxɪ.ɫːə ˈɫɑː.ɫə.rəx |]
[ˈdɑː.xə.rʲeʜ ˈq’iː.sə.mʲeʜ | jəʜ ˈwɔ.ʜə ˈdˤə.ɫʷʊr jəts |]
[ˈɫəɪ.ɫə.hə ˈɪ.ɫːə.ɫːəh ‖]
𝄆 [bʷɔs ˈʡær.ʒə ʋə ˈɫɑː.tːə | ˈmoɫ.xə.nəx ˈlʲeɫ.xa.rəx |]
[ˈtxɛː.ʃə̃ siː ˈdᶣøx.kɪ.nə | txʷɔ ˈlæ.tːə ˈdᶣør.zʷʊr dəts |]
[ˈɫəɪ.ɫə.hə ˈɪ.ɫːə.ɫːəh ‖] 𝄇

[txʷɔ ˈts’q’ɑː ə ˈtsʜə.nːʲe.nə | ˈq’ɑːr.dɛ.ɫːə ˈsɔʊ.tsʷʊr dəts |]
[ˈʡɔː.ʒə.ɫːə jə ˈmɑːr.ʃʷɔː | ˈʃɪ.nːʲex tsʜəʔ ˈɥɔ.qːʷʊr ɥʊ |]
[ˈɫəɪ.ɫə.hə ˈɪ.ɫːə.ɫːəh ‖]
𝄆 [ˈjɪ.ʒər(ə).ʃə txə̃ ˈtʃᶣøʏ.nəʃ | ˈɛː.ʃərʃ.tsə ˈjer.zə.ɥɔ |]
[ˈʜom.sər.tʃʷʊ ˈbˤær.gə.ʃə | ˈʜʏ.nərʃ.nə ˈɣɪ.tːə.dʷɔ |]
[ˈɫəɪ.ɫə.hə ˈɪ.ɫːə.ɫːəh ‖] 𝄇

[ˈmə.tsə.ɫːʷɔː ˈʜɔʊ.zə.dəʜ | ˈɔː.rə.məʃ dʷʊːr dʷʊ |]
[ˈʜʷɔ.gə.ɫːʷɔː txəʃ ˈbˤərz.dəʜ | ˈbɛː.tsə̃ txɪ miːr dʷʊ |]
[ˈɫəɪ.ɫə.hə ˈɪ.ɫːə.ɫːəh ‖]
𝄆 [ˈbyː.sə.nːə bʷɔrz ˈjex.kəʃ | ˈdʏ.nʲen.tʃʷʊ ˈdᶣøʏ.ɫːə dʷʊ |]
[ˈxəɫ.qʼə.nə ˈməx.kə.nə | ˈdə.ɫːə‿ə ˈmʏ.tʼəʜ dʷʊ |]
[ˈɫəɪ.ɫə.hə ˈɪ.ɫːə.ɫːəh ‖] 𝄇

=== English translation ===
We were born at night when the she-wolf whelped,

In the morning, to lion's deafening roar, they named us

There is no God except Allah

𝄆 In eagles' nests our mothers nursed us,

To tame wild stallions on steep rocks our fathers taught us.

There is no God except Allah 𝄇

Our mothers raised us to dedicate ourselves to our Nation and our Homeland,

And if our nation needs us we're ready to fight the oppressive hand.

There is no God except Allah

𝄆 We grew up free as eagles, princes of the mountains.

There is no threshold from which we will shy away.

There is no God except Allah 𝄇

Sooner will cliffs of granite begin to melt like molten lead,

Than any one of us shall lose our honour in life's struggles.

There is no God except Allah

𝄆 Sooner shall the Earth be swallowed up by the broiling sun,

Than we emerge from a trial in life without our honour!

There is no God except Allah 𝄇

Never to bow our heads to anyone, we give our sacred pledge,

To die or to live in freedom is our fate.

There is no God except Allah

𝄆 Our sisters heal our brothers' bloody wounds with their songs,

Lovers' eyes will supply the strength of arms.

There is no God except Allah 𝄇

If hunger weakens us, we'll gnaw on the roots of trees,

And if thirst debilitates us, we'll drink the dew from the grass!

There is no God except Allah

𝄆 For we were born at night when the she-wolf whelped.

We pledge our lives to God, Nation and Vainakh homeland.

There is no God except Allah! 𝄇
