= Chechen Americans =

Americans of Chechen birth or descent

Chechen Americans Чеченские Американцы Нохчийн Америкин Noxҫiyn Amerikin
Total population
- 1,000 (approximately)

Regions with significant populations
- New Jersey, New York City, Miami, Boston, Los Angeles

Languages
- Chechen, American English, Russian

Religion
- Sunni Islam

Chechen Americans are Americans of Chechen descent. Chechen people have origins from Chechnya, a federal subject of Russia.

== Demographics ==
The first Chechen settlers arrived in the U.S. in the 1950s and 1960s. They are a small minority group with a population numbering only several hundred, as of 2013. Exact statistics are difficult to obtain because Chechens are categorized as Russians in asylee reports. The estimated 150 Chechen families live mainly in Paterson, New Jersey, and form part of the larger North Caucasian community there. Other most significant Chechen communities are in Boston, Washington, D.C., New York City, and Los Angeles areas.

== Notable people ==
- Ilyas Akhmadov, foreign minister of the Chechen Republic of Ichkeria.
- Salavdi Gugaev, political activist, and one of the first Chechen immigrants to the US.
- Khassan Baiev, trauma surgeon.
