= Lovzar =

Lovzar Ловзар
- Origin: Grozny, Chechen-Ingush ASSR, Soviet Union
- Genres: Music of Chechnya, Folk music
- Years active: 1983-present
- Members: Makka Sagaipova

Lovzar (fun in Chechen language) is a Chechen children's dance ensemble that has conducted worldwide tours and has been an important face of Chechen culture to the world.

Founded in 1983 in the Republican Pioneers Palace in Grozny, Lovzar disbanded in 1994 due to the First Chechen War. In 1995 the heads of Lovzar recruited thirty boys and thirty girls to restart the group. Based in exile in Nalchik, Kabardino-Balkaria, the newly assembled group trained in traditional Chechen dance. The Chechen pop singer Makka Sagaipova is a member of this group.
