= Aguk Shagin =

- Native name: Ovkhoyn Shain
- Allegiance: Khazar Khaganate
- Branch: Army
- Service years: ?–736
- Rank: Commander of the Aukhs
- Conflicts: Second Arab–Khazar War; Marwan's invasion of Khazaria; Siege of Khasni–Khisnumma; Siege of Keshen

Aguk Shagin (Note: Russian: Агук Шагин, romanized: Aguk Shagin; Chechen: Ӏовхойн ШаӀин, romanized: Ovkhoyn Shain; also spelled Aukhovsky Shagin, Shagin Aguku or Shain Aukharu) was a Chechen commander during the Second Arab–Khazar War and the chieftain of the Chechen region of Aukh until his capture in 736.

Shagin was the commander of the Aukh detachments in the Khazar army, and, according to Aidayev, one of the most important generals in the Khazar army. The Aukhs had already positive diplomatic and economical ties with the Khazar Khaganate, as evidenced by excavations on the outskirts of the village Novokuli. (Note: Russian: Новокули, romanized: Novokuli; Chechen: ГӀачалкъа, romanized: Ġaçalq̇a)

Between the years 735–736, the Aukhs, led by Shagin, waged a fierce struggle against the invading Arab armies of Marwan II, who was invading the Khazar Khaganate. The Arabs first besieged and captured the fortress of Khasni–Khisnumma (Note: Russian: Хазар–Kала, romanized: Khazar–Kala; Chechen: ГӀазар–ГӀала, romanized: Ġazar–Ġala) and then advanced on the Aukh fortress Keshen (Note: Russian: Чапаево, romanized: Çapaevo; Chechen: Кешен–Эвла, romanized: Keşen–Ewla) and besieged it, which also succumbed to the Arab forces. Aguk Shagin himself was captured during the attack on Keshen and his later life is unknown.

Following the successful campaign in Aukh, the Arab army continued their punitive expedition into the rest of modern–day Chechnya between 736 and 738.
