= My Checheno-Ingushetia =

Former regional anthem

Checheno-Ingushetiya Moya
English: My Checheno-Ingushetia
- Чечено-Ингушетия Моя
- Emblem of the Checheno-Ingush ASSR
- Regional anthem of the Checheno-Ingush ASSR
- Also known as: Сан Нохч-ГӀалгӀайчоь; Са Нохч-ГӀалгӀайче
- Lyrics: Nurdin Muzayev
- Music: Aleksandr Khalebskii
- Adopted: 1966
- Relinquished: 1991 (Chechnya); 1992 (Ingushetia)
- Succeeded by: Anthem of the Chechen Republic of Ichkeria (Chechen Republic of Ichkeria); State Anthem of Ingushetia (Ingushetia)

Audio sample
- Vocal version: file; help

My Checheno-Ingushetia (Russian: Чечено-Ингушетия Моя; Chechen: Сан Нохч-ГӀалгӀайчоь; Ingush: Са Нохч-ГӀалгӀайче) was the regional anthem of the Checheno-Ingush ASSR.

The Checheno-Ingush Autonomous Soviet Socialist Republic and the Tuvan Autonomous Soviet Socialist Republic were once the only two autonomous republics among all republics in the Soviet Union to have official anthems.

== Lyrics ==
Russian original

I
Горы вековые, нивы золотые,
Милые раздольные края.
Гордые чинары, тучные отары,
𝄆 Чечено-Ингушетия моя! 𝄇

II
Вышки нефтяные, люди огневые,
Верные идеям Октября,
Родина джигитов, героев знаменитых –
𝄆 Чечено-Ингушетия моя! 𝄇

III
Слава боевая, доблесть трудовая,
Дружная советская семья,
Вечно молодая, республика родная –
𝄆 Чечено-Ингушетия моя! 𝄇

IV
Ленинское знамя, светится над нами,
Хорошеет горская земля,
К зорям коммунизма идёт моя отчизна
𝄆 Чечено-Ингушетия моя! 𝄇

Transliteration

I
Gory vekovyye, nivy zolotyye,
Milyye razdol’nyye kraya.
Gordyye chinary, tuchnyye otary,
𝄆 Checheno-Ingushetiya moya! 𝄇

II
Vyshki neftyanyye, lyudi ognevyye,
Vernyye ideyam Oktyabrya,
Rodina dzhigitov, geroyev znamenitykh –
𝄆 Checheno-Ingushetiya moya! 𝄇

III
Slava boyevaya, doblest’ trudovaya,
Druzhnaya sovetskaya sem’ya,
Vechno molodaya, respublika rodnaya –
𝄆 Checheno-Ingushetiya moya! 𝄇

IV
Leninskoye znamya, svetitsya nad nami,
Khorosheyet gorskaya zemlya,
K zoryam kommunizma idyot moya otchizna
𝄆 Checheno-Ingushetiya moya! 𝄇

Singable English translation

I
Ancient olden mountains, fields of golden wheat sheaves,
Dear lands of infinite expanse.
Proudly standing plane trees, countless weighty sheep flocks,
𝄆 Checheno-Ingushetia of mine! 𝄇

II
Oil-pumping stations, people's hearts of fire,
Loyal to October's glory deeds,
Motherland of horsemen, ever famous heroes –
𝄆 Checheno-Ingushetia of mine! 𝄇

III
Wartime shining glory, ardent labour efforts,
Strong and close-knit Soviet family,
Young and never-aging, Motherland republic –
𝄆 Checheno-Ingushetia of mine! 𝄇

IV
Lenin's flag all hours, shining there above us,
Mountain land gets better every day,
Communism is dawning, that's where my land's going
𝄆 Checheno-Ingushetia of mine! 𝄇
