= Sidanko =

Russian oil company

- Native name: Сиданко
- Type: Private
- Industry: Petroleum
- Founded: 5 May 1994; 32 years ago in Moscow, Russia
- Defunct: 1 January 2003
- Fate: Merged with TNK
- Successor: TNK-BP
- Key people: Robert Sheppard (President); Boris Jordan (former president); Ziya Bazhayev (former president)
- Revenue: 5,720,100,000,000 Russian ruble (1994)

Sidanko also transliterated as SIDANCO (Сиданко; Russian: Сибирско-Дальневосточная нефтяная компания, lit. 'Siberian-Far Eastern Oil Company') was a Russian oil company, the 8th largest company in the country by revenue in 1995. Sidanko owned several oil production units, including Chernogorneft and Udmurtneft.

== History ==
Sidanko was established through the Decree No. 452 of the Russian government, published on 5 May 1994. The company counted among its assets oil extraction and processing facilities in the Udmurt Republic and in the Khanty-Mansiysk, Yamalo-Nenets, Irkutsk and Sakhalin regions. It was privatized in December 1995, when the Russian government auctioned off a 51% share as part of the loans for shares scheme. (Note: Ziya 'Ziyaudi' Yusupovich Bazhaev (Russian: Зияуди Юсупович Бажаев) was president of Sidanko in the 1990s.) The 51% stake was awarded to the bank Mezhdunarodnaya Finansovaya Kompaniya in return for a $130 million loan, guaranteed by Vladimir Potanin's Uneximbank. The company came under the ownership of Uneximbank, which exercised control over it through the Interros holding company.

An additional 34% stake was sold by the government in September 1996, in an auction designed to have Uneximbank as the only admissible bidder. As with the rest of the loan for shares scheme, the Sidanko auction was considered rigged by most analysts. In November 1997 BP bought a 10% share in the company for $484 million.

Sidanko entered bankruptcy proceedings in February 1999, after ZAO Beta Ekho filed to recover a $22,000 debt. Beta Ekho was later revealed to be a vehicle of Mikhail Fridman's Alfa Group, which was using bankruptcy laws to avenge Fridman's exclusion by Potanin from the Svyazinvest privatization. In September 1999 western creditors agreed to cede their voting rights in the company to Russian government.

Tyumen Oil Company bought Sidanko's Chernogorneft unit for $176 million at a bankruptcy auction in November 1999. In 2001 Interros sold a 44% stake in the company for $650 million. BP raised its stake to 25% in 2002, paying $375 million for a 15% share. In 2003 Sidanko merged with TNK, Onako and the majority of BP's oil assets in Russia to form TNK-BP.

== See also ==
- Petroleum industry in Russia
