= Bekhan Tungaev =

- Born: Bekhan Tungaev; Kazakhstan, Soviet Union
- Died: 17/07/2022; Perpignan, France pancreatic cancer
- Nationality: Soviet Union (before 1991); Chechen Republic (1991–2000); Russia (after 2000)
- Style: Wrestling
- Years active: 1967 - 1976

Bekhan Tungaev (Chechen: Бекхан Тунгаев) was a Chechen wrestler who was born in Kazakhstan. He became famous in Chechnya after winning a European championship back in the 1970s. He started wrestling in 1967, when he went to section of wrestling trainer Degi Bagayev (Дэги Багаев), also in the same year he took part in his first championship - championship of the republic among boys, where he got the first place. He was member of the Soviet Union team from 1969 to 1976. In 1970 he won the championship of the USSR. He was also a three-time champion of the Soviet Armed Forces, two-time winner of the Soviet Cup, winner of international tournaments in Mongolia, Turkey, Iran, Hungary, Romania. He was also the winner of the tournament Olympic Hopes (Олимпийская надежда), where friendly armies played. He got the silver medal in the Games of the Soviet nations (Спартакиада народов СССР) and he was a three-time champion of the Caucasus.

At various tournaments he defeated many world, European and Olympic champions, such as: Gennadi Strakhov (USSR), David Peterson (USA), Davat Surena (Mongolia), József Csatári (Hungary), Sukhet Saraya (Iran), Ilya Mate (USSR), Paweł Kurchewski (Poland), Alyeksandr Prokopchuk (USSR). He died Sunday 17 July in Perpignan and he is buried at Valerik.
