= Ziya Bazhayev =

Russian businessman (1960–2000)

Ziya Yusupovich Bazhayev
- Зия Юсупович Бажаев
- Born: July 11, 1960
- Died: March 9, 2000 (aged 39); Moscow, Russia
- Occupation: Businessman

Ziya 'Ziyaudi' Yusupovich Bazhayev (Russian: Зия Юсупович Бажаев; July 11, 1960 — March 9, 2000) was a prominent Russian businessman of Chechen origin specializing in oil trading.

During the 1990s, he was president of Sidanko (Russian: «СИДАНКО»), (Note: Sidanko (Russian: «СИДАНКО») is also transliterated as SIDANCO.) the Swiss company Lia Oil (Russian: Швейцарская фирма «Лиа Ойл») from 1992 to 1995, (Note: Lia Oil (Russian: Швейцарская фирма «Лиа Ойл») was created with support from his brother Musa (Russian: Муса).) the state unitary oil company in war-torn Chechnya, Southern Oil Company (YUNCO) (Russian: Южная нефтяная компания (ЮНКО)) (Note: Ziya Bashayev created Southern Oil Company (YUNCO) (Russian: Южная нефтяная компания (ЮНКО)) in April 1995 and is often improperly transliterated as UNCO.) and the oil company Alliance Group (Russian: «Группа Альянс»), which he founded in April 1998. With numerous personnel from Sidanko, Alliance gained control of the Khabarovsk Refinery at Khabarovsk, which previously was owned by Sidanko, and, a year later, gained control of the Kherson Refinery in Ukraine.

He died in Moscow during a crash of a Yakovlev Yak-40 aircraft shortly after takeoff on March 9, 2000, together with a Russian journalist Artyom Borovik. Bazhayev's death is mentioned in many Nigerian 419 scam e-mails.

== Literature ==
- Musa Geshaev. Famous Chechens. — Moscow: Musaizdat, 2006. — Vol. 4. — pp. 126–159.
