= Xava Tashaeva =

Russian singer

Xava Tashaeva (Chechen: Хава Ташаева or Xava Taşaeva) is a popular young Chechen pop singer. She has a wide fan base, but appeals mainly to teenagers and young adults. She is the daughter of the Russian singer-bardess Marem Taşaeva.

She is also friends with many other Chechen pop singers, including Makka Sagaipova, Ilyas Ayubov, and (before she died) Milana Balaeva.

Xava Tashaeva is notable for her experimentation with various genres. She also produces various traditional Chechen folk music songs.

== Discography ==
Xava released her first album, Bezaman Laman, in 2006. It has 14 tracks:

Track 01. Bezam Hu Yu

Track 02. Michah Yu Bexke

Track 03. Homenig

Track 04. Satiysar

Track 05. Sedarchiy Soh Ma Deliysha

Track 06. Rechka Detstva

Track 07. Jarja Bjargash

Track 08. Mavila Bexkaza

Track 09. Berhiyta Sho

Track 10. Beralla

Track 11. Tsha Minot

Track 12. Aganan Yish

Track 13. So Yagjara Hitja

Track 14. Kavkaz

== See also ==
- Maryam Tashaeva
- Makka Sagaipova
- Chechen pop
