= State Anthem of the Chechen Republic =

Noxçiyn Respublikan şatlaqan illi
English: State Anthem of the Chechen Republic
- Нохчийн Республикан шатлакхан илли
- Official standard of the President of the Chechen Republic
- Regional anthem of Chechnya, Russia
- Lyrics: Akhmad Kadyrov
- Music: Umar Beksultanov
- Adopted: July 2010

Audio sample
- Official orchestral vocal recording: file; help

The State Anthem of the Chechen Republic was officially adopted on 28 July 2010, when it was approved by the Parliament of the Chechen Republic. Between 2000 and 2010, the Republic of Chechnya did not have its own anthem, unlike other first-level administrative divisions of the Russian Federation. The former self-proclaimed Chechen Republic of Ichkeria had its own anthem.

The author of the text is Akhmad Kadyrov, the first Head of the Chechen Republic and father of current Head Ramzan Kadyrov. The accompanying music was composed by Chechen musician Umar Beksultanov.

Oppositions to the Kadyrov regime prefer the use of the Anthem of the Chechen Republic of Ichkeria over the current State Anthem of the Chechen Republic.

== Lyrics ==
Chechen original

Cyrillic script	Latin script
Харцоно цӏе тесна хийла хьо ягарх, Нохчийчоь ца йоьжна, гӏаьттина яха. 𝄆 Кавказан ткъес хилла, маршонан ага, Хьан лаьттан сий дина яхь йолчу наха. 𝄇 Барт болу хьан къаьмнаш – мах боцу беркат! Хьо йоцург, Нана яц, нохчийн халкъ хьаста. Тхан дахар, тхан дерзар Даймехкан кхерчахь, Декъалдар доьхуш ду, Далла беш хастам. Башламан баххьашка дайн синош дуьссу. Органа тулгӏено ненан мотт буьйцу. 𝄆 Исбаьхьа совгӏат хьо, азаллехь делла! Шатлакхан илли ду тхуна ницкъ белларг! 𝄇 Къинхьегам, хьан хьуьнарш хазделла шайна, Хьалкъаца лерам бар кхаъ хуьлда хьуна. 𝄆 Машаран гӏаролехь ирсан некъ тайна, Сий долуш Нохчийчоь ехийла тхуна! 𝄇	Xarcono ċe tesna xiyla ẋo yagarx, Noxçiyçö ca yöƶna, ġättina yaxa. 𝄆 Kavkazan tq̇es xilla, marşonan aga, Ẋan lättan siy dina yaẋ yolçu naxa. 𝄇 Bart bolu ẋan q̇ämnaş – max bocu berkat! Ẋo yocurg, Nana yac, noxçiyn xalq̇ ẋasta. Txan daxar, txan derzar Daymexkan qerçaẋ, Deq̇aldar döxuş du, Dalla beş xastam. Başlaman baẋẋaşka dayn sinoş düssu. Organa tulġeno nenan mott büycu. 𝄆 Isbäẋa sovġat ẋo, azalleẋ della! Şatlaqan illi du txuna nicq̇ bellarg! 𝄇 Q̇inẋegam, ẋan ẋünarş xazdella şayna, Ẋalq̇aca leram bar qa’ xülda ẋuna. 𝄆 Maşaran ġaroleẋ irsan neq̇ tayna, Siy doluş Noxçiyçö yexiyla txuna! 𝄇
Arabic script	IPA transcription (Note: See Help:IPA, Chechen language § Phonology and Chechen language § Alphabets.)
خارر̤وٓنوٓ ڗە تەسنا خییلا حوٓ یاگارخ، نوٓخچییچوٓ ر̤ا یوٓجنا غاتّینا یاخا. 𝄆 کاوکازان تڨەس خیلّا، مارشوٓنان آگا، حان لاتّان سیی دینا یاح یوٓلچو ناحا. 𝄇 بارت بوٓلو حان ڨامناش – ماخ بوٓر̤و بەرکات! حوٓ یوٓر̤ورگ، نانا یار̤، نوٓخچیین خالڨ حاستا. تخان داخار، تخان دەرزار دایمەخکان قەرچاح، دەڨالدار دوٓخوش دو، دالّا بەش خاستام. 𝄇 باشلامان باحّاشکا داین سینوٓس دوسّو. اوٓرگانا تولغەنوٓ نەنان موٓتّ بویر̤و. 𝄆 ایسباحا سوٓوغات حوٓ، آزالّەح دەلّا. شاتلاقان ایلّی دو تخونا نیر̤ڨ بەلّارگ. 𝄇 ڨینحەگام، حان حونارش خازدەلّا شاینا، حالڨار̤ا لەرام بار قائ خولدا حونا. 𝄆 ماشاران غاروٓلەح ایرسان نەڨ تاینا، سیی دوٓلوش نوٓخچییچوٓ یەخییلا تخونا! 𝄇	[ˈxər.tsʷo.nʷo tsʼʲe ˈtʲes.nə | ˈxiː.ɫə ʜʷo ˈjə.gərx |] [ˈnʷox.tʃiː.tʃᶣø tsə ˈɥøʒ.nə ˈɣæ.tːɪ.nə ˈjə.xə |] 𝄆 [ˈkəf.kə.zə̃ tqʼʲes ˈxɪ.ɫːə | ˈmər.ʃʷo.nə̃ ˈə.gə |] [ʜə̃ ˈɫæ.tːə̃ siː ˈdɪ.nə | jəʜ ˈjoɫ.tʃʊ ˈnə.xə ‖] 𝄇 [bərt ˈbʷo.ɫʊ ʜə̃ ˈqʼæm.nəʃ məx ˈbʷo.tsʊ ˈbʲer.kət ‖] [ʜʷo ˈjo.tsʊɾg ˈnə.nə jəts ˈnʷox.tʃĩː xəɫqʼ ˈʜəs.tə ‖] [txə̃ ˈdə.xər txə̃ ˈdʲer.zər ˈdəɪ.mɛx.kə̃ ˈqʲer.tʃəʜ |] [ˈdʲe.qʼəɫ.dər ˈdᶣø.xʊʃ dʊ | ˈdə.ɫːə bʲeʃ ˈxəs.təm ‖] [ˈbəʃ.ɫə.mə̃ ˈbəx.ʜəʃ.kə | də̃ɪ̃ ˈsɪ.nʷoʃ ˈdʏ.sːʊ ‖] [ˈwor.gə.nə ˈtʊɫ.ɣɛː.nʷo ˈnʲe.nə̃ mʷotː ˈbyː.tsʊ ‖] 𝄆 [ˈɪs.bæ.ʜə ˈsoʊ.ɣət ʜʷo | ˈə.zə.lːʲeʜ ˈdʲe.ɫːə ‖] [ˈʃət.ɫə.qə̃ ˈɪ.lːɪ dʊ | ˈtxʊ.nə nɪtsq’ ˈbʲe.ɫːərg ‖] 𝄇 [ˈqʼɪ̃.ʜʲe.gəm ʜə̃ ˈʜʏ.nərʃ ˈxəz.dʲe.ɫːə ˈʃəɪ.nə |] [ˈʜəɫ.q’ə.tsə ˈlʲe.rəm bər qəʔ ˈxʏɫ.də ˈʜʊ.nə ‖] 𝄆 [ˈmə.ʃə.rə̃ ˈɣə.rʷo.lːʲeʜ ˈɪr.sə̃ nʲeq’ ˈtəɪ.nə |] [siː ˈdʷo.ɫʊʃ ˈnʷox.tʃiː.tʃᶣø ˈje.xiː.ɫə ˈtxʊ.nə ‖] 𝄇

English translation

No matter how unjust the bloodshed burned you,
For times countless you kept falling and rising.
𝄆 Lightning of Kavkaz, cradle of liberty,
Your proud people kept glorious your honour. 𝄇

Treasured is the harmony between your peoples,
There is no other homeland for us Chechens.
Life and death in the hearth of our homeland,
Praise to thee, and blessed be our native homeland!

The souls of our forebears land atop Bashlam,
The waves of Argun speak our mother tongue.
𝄆 You are a grand gift given for life to us,
And our anthem has granted strength to us! 𝄇

Labour, courage, and respect of the people,
Let this for thee be delightful news.
𝄆 The guardian of peace, the path to happiness,
Let us all live in glorious Chechnya! 𝄇

Russian translation

Как бы ты ни горела огнем несправедливости Чечня,
Не падала и вставала, чтобы жить.
𝄆 Молния Кавказа, колыбель свободы,
Берегли честь твоей земли гордые люди. 𝄇

Согласие между твоими народами — бесценное богатство!
Кроме тебя, нет матери, чтобы приласкать народ Чечни.
Нашу жизнь и нашу кончину в очаге Родины,
Просим, восхваляя тебя, благослови.

На вершину Башлама спускаются души предков.
Волна Аргуна говорит на языке матери.
𝄆 Великолепный подарок ты, данный нам жизнью!
Наш гимн дал нам силу! 𝄇

Любовь к труду и отваге, уважение народа,
Пусть будет для тебя приятной вестью.
𝄆 На страже свободы, найдя счастливую дорогу,
Живи для нас, достойная Чечня! 𝄇

== Regulations ==
The anthem of the Chechen Republic is performed when the Head of the Chechen Republic assumes office after taking the oath; at the opening and closing of the republic's parliamentary meetings; during the official ceremony of lifting the national flag; and during ceremonies of meetings and wires of delegations of foreign countries, intergovernmental organizations, and official visits to the republic by foreign head of states.

The anthem can also be played during the openings and closings of monuments, memorials, ceremonial meetings, holiday meetings, during other solemn and protocol events held by the state authorities of Chechnya, local self-government bodies, and state NGOs.

Additionally, the anthem is performed during official ceremonies during sports competitions in the Chechen Republic in accordance with the rules of holding these competitions (in particular, at the first and last home game of the "Terek Football Club" season).

== See also ==
- Anthem of the Chechen Republic of Ichkeria
