= State Anthem of Ingushetia =

Anthem of a Russian federal subject

Ġalġay Respublika paççaẋalqen gimn
English: State Anthem of the Republic of Ingushetia
- ГӀалгӀай Республика паччахьалкxен гимн
- Coat of arms of Ingushetia
- Regional anthem of Ingushetia
- Also known as: «Государственный гимн Республики Ингушетии»
- Lyrics: Ramzan Tsurov (1993, 2010)
- Music: Ruslan Zangiyev
- Adopted: 27 August 1993; 7 December 2010
- Preceded by: "My Checheno-Ingushetia"

Audio sample
- Digital instrumental and male vocal rendition in A major and E minor: file; help

Official orchestral instrumental recording (one verse)

The State Anthem of Ingushetia is one of the national symbols of the Republic of Ingushetia, a federal subject of Russia, along with its flag and coat of arms. The music was composed by Ruslan Zangiyev, with accompanying lyrics by Ingush poet Ramzan Tsurov in 1993. It was first adopted as a de facto regional anthem on 27 August 1993, and then readopted officially on 7 December 2010.

== Lyrics ==
In 1993, the Ingush national congress wanted an anthem for the Republic of Ingushetia, at which the poems written by Ingush poet Ramzan Tsurov were accepted. Later that year, Ingush composer Ruslan Zangiyev put Tsurov's poems into music. Subsequently, the Parliament of Ingushetia officially approved the State Anthem of Ingushetia.

=== Current lyrics ===
==== Ingush original ====
Cyrillic script

I
Лоамий мехка хозагӀа дола дакъа
ДӀа а лаьца улл хьо, ГӀалгӀайче,
Курра йолаш никъ хьо хьай дӀахо
Дуне мел латт яха хьо, ГӀалгӀайче.

𝄆 АллахӀ — Даьла, низ ба ГӀалгӀайченна, (Note: Sometimes written ГӀалгӀайче [ʁəɫ.ʁəj.t͡ʃʲe].)
Везан — Даьла, йоахае ГӀалгӀайче! 𝄇

II
Лаьтта даттӀал йоккха я човнаш,
МоастагӀаша хьа дегӀа яьраш.
Эздий хилба хьа керахьа къонгаш,
ЧӀир леха, бохабе гӀаьраш.

𝄆 АллахӀ — Даьла, низ ба ГӀалгӀайченна,
ЧӀир леха низ (Note: Sometimes written из [ɘz].) ба ГӀалгӀайченна! 𝄇

III
Дунен чухьа лехаргьяц оатто,
Деза вайна хьагӀ йоаца вахар.
Лаьтта оахаш дахаргда лаьтта,
Низ кхоаче из лаьтта аха.

𝄆 АллахӀ — Даьла, низ ба ГӀалгӀайченна,
Лаьтта аха низ ба ГӀалгӀайченна! 𝄇

IV
Бокъонга сатувс хьа уйлаша,
Дог, тов мо, леталу хьа чӀоагӀа.
Тха Даьхе, хьо массаза хийла,
Кортамукъа, дех Даьлага оаха.

𝄆 АллахӀ — Даьла, низ ба ГӀалгӀайченна,
Кортамукъа халлийта ГӀалгӀайче! 𝄇

Latin script

I
Loamiy mexka xozaġa dola daq̇a
Dja a läca ull ẋo, Ġalġayçe,
Kurra yolaş niq̇ ẋo ẋay djaxo
Dune mel latt yaxa ẋo, Ġalġayçe.

𝄆 Allah — Däla, niz ba Ġalġayçenna,
Vezan — Däla, yoaxaye Ġalġayçe! 𝄇

II
Lätta dattjal yoqqa ya çovnaş,
Moastaġaşa ẋa deġa yäraş.
Ezdiy xilba ẋa keraẋa q̇ongaş,
Ç̇ir lexa, boxabe ġäraş.

𝄆 Allah — Däla, niz ba Ġalġayçenna,
Ç̇ir lexa iz ba Ġalġayçenna! 𝄇

III
Dunen çuẋa lexargyac oatto,
Deza vayna ẋaġ yoaca vaxar.
Lätta oaxaş daxargda lätta,
Niz qoaçe iz lätta axa.

𝄆 Allah — Däla, niz ba Ġalġayçenna,
Lätta axa niz ba Ġalġayçenna! 𝄇

IV
Boq̇onga satuvs ẋa uylaşa,
Dog, tov mo, letalu ẋa ç̇oaġa.
Txa Däxe, ẋo massaza xiyla,
Kortamuq̇a, dex Dälaga oaxa.

𝄆 Allah — Däla, niz ba Ġalġayçenna,
Kortamuq̇a xalliyta Ġalġayçeǃ 𝄇

Arabic script

١
لوٓاميى مەخكا خوٓزاغا دوٓلا داڨا
،دعا الار̤ا ولّ حوٓ، غالغايچە
كورّا يوٓلاش نىڨ حوٓ حاي دعاخوٓ
.دونە مەل لاتّ ياخا حوٓ، غالغايچە

،الله — دالا، نىز با غالغايچەنّا 𝄇
𝄆 !وەزان — دالا، يوٓاخاە غالغايچە

٢
،لاتّا داطّال يوٓقّا يا چوٓوناش
.موٓاستاغاشا حا دەغا ياراش
،ەزديى خىلبا حا كەراحا ڨوٓنگش
.ڃىر لەخا، بوٓخابە غاراش

،الله — دالا، نىز با غالغايچەنّا 𝄇
𝄆 !ڃىر لەخا، ىر با غالغايچەنّا

٣
،دونەن چوحا لەخارگيار̤ وٓاتّوٓ
.دەزا واينا حاغ يوٓار̤ا واخار
،لاتّا وٓاخاش داخارگدا لاتّا
.نىز قوٓاچە ىز لاتّا آخا

𝄆 ،الله — دالا، نىز با غالغايچەنّا
!لاتّا آخا نىز با غالغايچەنّا 𝄇

٤
،بوٓڨوٓنگا ساتووس حا ويلاشا
.دوٓگ، توٓو موٓ، لەتالو حا ڃوٓاغا
،تخا داخە، حوٓ ماسّازا خيىلا
.كوٓرتاموڨا، دەخ دالاگا وٓاخا

𝄆 ،الله — دالا، نىز با غالغايچەنّا
!كوٓرتاموڨا خالّيىتا غالغايچە 𝄇

IPA transcription as sung (Note: See File:Anthem of Ingushetia - ГIалгIайчен гимн.ogg, Help:IPA and Ingush language § Phonology.)

1
[ɫɔ̯ɑ.mʲiː mʲeχ.kə χo.zəʁ‿doɫ dɑ.qʼə |]
[d͡ʡɑ‿ɑ lɛ̯æ.t͡sə uɫː ʜo ʁəɫ.ʁəj.t͡ʃʲe ‖]
[kur.rə jo.ɫəʃ nʲɪqʼ ʜo ʜɑj d͡ʡɑ.χo |]
[dʏ.nʲe mʲeɫ ɫɑtː jɑχ ʜo ʁəɫ.ʁəj.t͡ʃʲe ‖]

𝄆 [ɑɫ.ɫɑh dɛ̯æ.ɫə nʲɪz bɑ ʁəɫ.ʁəj.t͡ʃʲen |]
[ʋʲe.zən dɛ̯æ.ɫə jɔ̯ɑ.χi.e ʁəɫ.ʁəj.t͡ʃʲe ‖] 𝄇

2
[lɛ̯æt.tə dɑt.tʼəɫ joχ.qə jə t͡ʃoʊ̯.nəʃ |]
[mɔ̯ɑs.tɑ.ʁəʃ ʜɑ dʲe.ʁə jɛ̯æ.rəʃ ‖]
[ez.dʲij χɘɫ(ə).bə ʜɑ kʲe.rɑʜ qʼo(j)n.gəʃ |]
[t͡ʃʼʲɪr(ə) lʲe.χə bo.χə.bʲe ʁɛ̯æ.rəʃ ‖]

𝄆 [ɑɫ.ɫɑh dɛ̯æ.ɫə nʲɪz bɑ ʁəɫ.ʁəj.t͡ʃʲen |]
[t͡ʃʼʲɪr(ə) lʲe.χə nʲɪz bɑ ʁəɫ.ʁəj.t͡ʃʲen ‖] 𝄇

3
[du.nʲen t͡ʃʊ.ʜə lʲe.χər.gi.ɑt͡s ɔ̯ɑt.to |]
[dʲe.zə ʋəj.nə ʜɑg jɔ̯ɑ.t͡sə ʋɑ.χər ‖]
[lɛ̯æt.tə ɔ̯ɑ.χəʒ‿dɑ.χərg.də lɛ̯æt.tə |]
[nʲɪz qɔ̯ɑ.t͡ʃʲe ɘz lɛ̯æt.tə ɑ.χə ‖]

𝄆 [ɑɫ.ɫɑh dɛ̯æ.ɫə nʲɪz bɑ ʁəɫ.ʁəj.t͡ʃʲen |]
[lɛ̯æt.tə ɑ.χə nʲɪz bɑ ʁəɫ.ʁəj.t͡ʃʲen ‖] 𝄇

4
[bo.qʼoŋ.gə sɑ.tuːs ʜɑ ʏj.ɫɑʃ |]
[dok toʊ̯ mo lʲe.tə.ɫu ʜɑ t͡ʃʼɔ̯ɑ.ʁə ‖]
[t͡χə dɛ̯æ.χʲe ʜo mɑs.səz(ə) χɘj.ɫə |]
[kor.tə.mu.qʼə dʲeχ dɛ̯æ.ɫəg(ə) ɔ̯ɑ.χə ‖]

𝄆 [ɑɫ.ɫɑh dɛ̯æ.ɫə nʲɪz bɑ ʁəɫ.ʁəj.t͡ʃʲen |]
[kor.tə.mu.qʼə χəl.lʲiːt ʁəɫ.ʁəj.t͡ʃʲe ‖] 𝄇

==== Other translations ====
English version

I
Within the finest of mountains
Ingushetia proudly lies.
Embarking into the future,
Ingushetia forever.

𝄆 God strengthen Ingushetia,
May God bless Ingushetia! 𝄇

II
If the land be torn asunder,
If foes led you to disaster.
May heroic sons be noble,
And survivors will avenge them.

𝄆 God strengthen Ingushetia,
May God enliven the fallen! 𝄇

III
Looking not for a life easy,
But to live without dark envy.
Cultivated is our homeland,
Gallant we are so she be grand.

𝄆 God strengthen Ingushetia,
May our homeland be prosperous! 𝄇

IV
Your ambition for righteousness,
Your heart ablaze and luminous.
Fervidly burning it becomes,
Long live our ancestral homeland.

𝄆 God strengthen Ingushetia,
Free be our Ingushetia! 𝄇

Russian version

I
Посреди горного края
Есть Ингушетия наша.
Гордо вперёд выступая,
Ты всё моложе и краше.

𝄆 Боже, дай сил, сохрани же
Ты Ингушетию нашу! 𝄇

II
Может земля содрогнуться
От ран, тебе нанесённых.
Многим сынам не вернуться, -
Нет среди них неотмщённых.

𝄆 Боже, дай сил, сохрани же
Ты Ингушетию нашу! 𝄇

III
Лёгкой судьбы мы не ищем
И злобы чёрной не держим.
Землю храним и жилище,
Каждый, будь самоотвержен!

𝄆 Боже, дай сил, сохрани же
Ты Ингушетию нашу! 𝄇

IV
Нам справедливой дай жизни,
Пламенем сердце зажги же!
Будь же свободна, Отчизна,
Молим тебя, о Всевышний!

𝄆 Боже, дай сил, сохрани же
Ты Ингушетию нашу! 𝄇

=== Original version ===
In 2005, Head Murat Zyazikov decided that the anthem of Ingushetia was too aggressive and did not reflect the "people's desire for peace, creation, good neighborly relations", so he approved a new version, titled "My Motherland" (Russian: Моя Родина) to the verses of the Ingush poet Said Chakhkiev. This version, used until 2010, was translated by Igor Lyapin.
