= Lyalya Nasukhanova =

Lyalya Andarbekovna Nasukhanova
- Ляля Андарбековна Насуханова
- Nasukhanova in 1966
- Born: 1939; Starye Atagi, Chechen-Ingush ASSR
- Died: 2000 (aged 60–61); North Ossetia-Alania, Russian Federation
- Spouse: Aslan Bitarov
- Awards: Honored Master of Sports of the USSR

Lyalya Andarbekovna Nasukhanova (Russian: Ляля Андарбековна Насуханова, Chechen: Насуханова Ляля Ӏандарбекан йоӀ; 1939 – 2000) was a parachutist, aviator, flight instructor, and the first Chechen woman to become a pilot. Throughout her career she won many flight competitions, completed over 100 parachute jumps, gained well over 2,500 flight hours on Yakovlev and MiG jets, and trained more than 200 novice pilots. After dedicating 23 years of her life to aviation she entered politics before her death as a refugee during the First Chechen War.

== Early life ==
Nasukhanova was born in 1939 to a Chechen family in the rural village of Starye Atagi. In 1944 she and her entire family were designated as "traitors" because of their ethnicity and deported along with the rest of the Chechen and Ingush nations. Her family was exiled to the town of Taraz in the Kazakh SSR, where she spent most of her childhood and attended school next to an airfield that led to her developing a passion for aviation. Despite constant reminders that she belonged to a "criminal nationality" and being told by her family that aviation is not a woman's job, she went on to pursue aviation after moving to Alma-Ata in 1955. There she was allowed to make parachute jumps but not fly aircraft at the local aeroclub; but was only granted permission from the authorities to do so because they expected her to quit immediately. While a parachutist at the aeroclub she had a meeting with decorated women pilots Valentina Grizodubova, Nina Rusakova, and Yevdokiya Bershanskaya, which further increased her desires to become an aircraft pilot.

== Return from exile ==
After the Chechen nation was granted the right of return in 1957, Nasukhanova returned to Chechnya and briefly lived in Grozny. She applied to join the Makhachkala aeroclub in Dagestan, where after six months of training the cadets got to fly aircraft. Because of her official status as a former exile, she applied and faced rejection numerous times from the aeroclub before she was eventually accepted, with limitations on her activities. She lived with relatives in the city during her training, and had to get up at 3:00 AM to walk across the city to the airfield. Eventually she made her first flight on a Yak-18.

== Piloting career ==
After completing training at the Makhachkala aeroclub she sought to continue her studies at an aviation technical school, but her family continued to express disapproval of her career choice. One year after being accepted into the Central Flight Technical School in Saransk she entered the school, and she soon went on to distinguish herself in aerobatics competitions. In one segment of a competition in Rostov-on-Don she scored first place, outcompeting 26 male pilots. At the 1962 national championship in Samara, she reached second place among 54 competitors in the individual competition, but was not allowed to participate in any team exercises. In 1963 she was the bronze medalist among 35 athletes at the first Moscow Women's aerosports competition. That year the newspaper Pravda praised her feats, saying "She flies into the wind where even eagles dare not rise into the air."

In 1964 she was appointed as commander of an echelon, making her the first woman in the Soviet Union to hold such a position in a unit of jet aircraft. At the Grozny Aviation Training Center she flew the MiG-17 and trained new pilots. In the 1980s she was awarded a diploma "For merits in the training of DOSAAF athletes." by cosmonaut Georgy Beregovoy. After devoting 23 years of her life to piloting, she left aviation and began her political career.

=== Attempts to become a cosmonaut ===
In the 1960s Nasukhanova applied to become a cosmonaut four times, but because she was Vainakh and sent into exile, she was considered a "special settler" and member of a "criminal nationality", and could only be allowed into the cosmonaut corps if granted an exception by the Central Committee of the Communist Party, which did not happen despite many of her friends who were cosmonauts supporting admitting her. All four times she applied to become a cosmonaut she was rejected, even though she had far more piloting and virtually the same amount of parachuting experience as Valentina Tereshkova when applying.

== Later life ==
Nasukhanova worked in politics after serving in aviation for 23 years. After graduating from the Chechen-Ingush Pedagogical Institute she served as a deputy on the Grozny city council, the secretary of the Grozny regional Communist Party committee, and as the chairman of the Regional Trade Union Council. Upon the start of the First Chechen War Nasukhanova and her husband, flight instructor Aslan Bitarov, moved to a village near Vladikavkaz in North Ossetia. She died in 2000 at the age of 61 as a refugee.

== Honors and dedications ==
Along with various awards for her flight merits, Nasukhanova was honored in culture and the arts. The famous Chechen poet Raisa Akhmatova dedicated a poem to her, and a portrait of her was painted by Valentin Mordovin.
