= Novokuli =

Novokuli Новокули ГӀачалкъа
- Selo
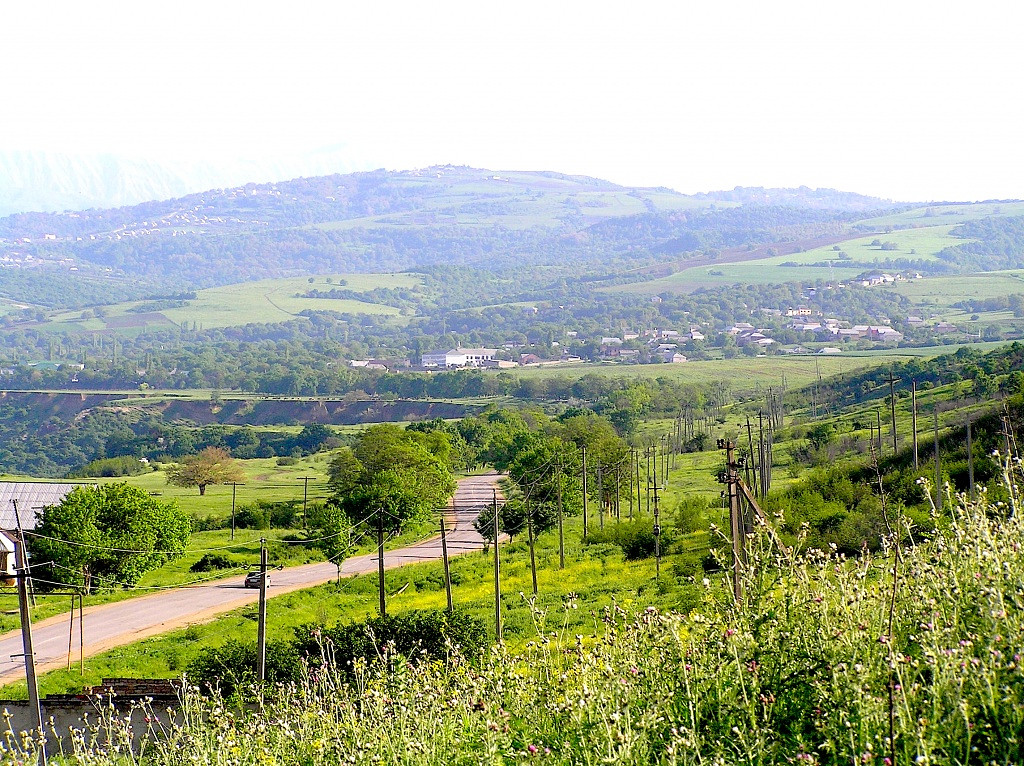
- Novokuli

- Location within Republic of Dagestan Location within Russia
- Coordinates: 43°09′N 46°31′E
- Country: Russia
- Region: Republic of Dagestan
- District: Novolaksky District
- Time zone: UTC+3:00

Novokuli (Russian: Новокули; Chechen: ГӀачалкъа, Ġaçalq̇a) is a rural locality (a selo) and the administrative center of Novokulinsky Selsoviet, Novolaksky District, Republic of Dagestan, Russia. The population was 2,386 as of 2010. There are 11 streets.

== Geography ==
Novokuli is located 15 km southwest of Khasavyurt, on the bank of the Yaryk-su River. Charavali and Zoriotar are the nearest rural localities.

== Nationalities ==
Chechens and Laks live there.
