= Gubash of Gukhoy =

- Birth name: КIужалан Губаш
- Born: Guta, Chechnya
- Died: Guta, Chechnya
- Allegiance: Teip Gukhoy
- Battles / wars: Caucasian War

Gubash of Gukhoy (Chechen: КIужалан Губаш, Russian: Губаш Гухоевский) was a Chechen elder of the Gukhoy teip. He was notorious for being anti-Imamate and fighting Imam Shamil while being blind. Most of the information about Gubash is from the two scribes of Imam Shamil named Imanmuhammad Gigatlinsky and Al-Karakhi. However Dalkhan Khozhaev's book "Чеченцы в Русско-Кавказской войне" from 1998 tells several folk tales about the personality of Gubash and the incident in Guta.

== Early life ==
Gubash was born in the Chechen highland village of Guta which belonged to the Gukhoy teip. He was a famous warrior and leader of the Gukhoy clansmen that respected him. Gubash and his brother Gela were descendants of a man called "Sharak" that allegedly came from the Malkhi teip that is located in the southern Chechnya region. Even though Gubash is described as being against the "Sharia" in contemporary sources by the scribes of Imam Shamil he was still a Muslim as Islam had already spread to all parts of Chechnya during this time.

== Appearance ==
The appearance of Gubash is described by Imam Shamil's scribe Imanmuhammad Gigatlinskiy:

This Gubash was a big man of humongous height. His look was horrible. The person who has seen the fangs of this person, was consumed by fear. To any person that Gubash took a look at, it was clearly evident that he was just tolerating them and he didn't care in the slightest about them. While speaking his own language, Gubash's voice sounded very harsh and hard that it seemed like he was talking out of a bottom of a vase.

— Imanmuhammad Gigatlinsky, Chronicle

== Opposition to the Imamate ==
During the reign of the Caucasian Imamate under Imam Shamil, most of Chechnya accepted the Imamate after Shamil's refuge to Chechnya. However, there were several clans and villages that refused to accept Shamil, one of them was the village of Guta which Shamil sent envoys to in hopes of convincing the village's elder Gubash into accepting his rule. When the envoys arrived and demanded Gubash to accept Shamil's rule, there occurred an altercation after Gubash insulted them by saying: "So bökhachu suilichun kIelakh lelar vats" (I will not be ruled by a filthy Avar). Gubash and his fellow villagers killed the envoys and sent back one of them to convey the message to Shamil.

Opposition and control of Imam Shamil by the Chechens was a common thing as evidenced by quotes of contemporary Russian generals:

Chechens are indisputably the bravest people in the eastern mountains. Trips to their land have always cost us bloody sacrifices. But this nation was never completely imbued with Muridism. Of all the eastern highlanders, the Chechens most of all retained their personal and social independence and forced Shamil, who ruled despotically in Dagestan, to make them a thousand concessions in the form of government, in the people's duties and in the ritual severity of faith.

— R. Fadeev, Sixty Years of the Caucasian War

After the fight between Gubash and the Imamate's envoys, Imam Shamil decided to besiege Guta. He brought with him several warriors and attacked the village. According to the scribes of Shamil, such as Imanmuhammad Gigatlinsky and Muhammad Tahir al-Karakhi, the villagers of Guta wanted to accept the Imamate but were terrified of Gubash whom both scribes described as a "Bandit". However, the descendants of the villagers in Guta claim otherwise, and that they to this day consider Gubash a national hero.

Gubash and his fellow clansmen retreated into the clan tower to defend against the forces of the Imamate but were eventually defeated. Gubash himself was captured by Imam Shamil who gouged out both of his eyes and threw him into the tower cellar. Later in the night, Gubash managed to escape from the cellar after strangling one of the guards to death. Gubash while being blind managed to sneak up to Imam Shamil who was sleeping, but he woke up after hearing Gubash climb up the balcony during the night. A fight took place between Gubash and Shamil which almost resulted in the death of the Imam but several of his guards came to the rescue. Some of his closest naibs such as Shaban and Maash were slain in this fight. When another naib called Zirar al-Shahadi entered the scene, the Imam ordered him to quickly strike at the fingers of Gubash who was stabbing him repeatedly. After doing so, Gubash lost control of his dagger and was killed by the naibs. Due to the strength and height of Gubash it took more than 5 men to kill him, as a result of this fight Imam Shamil received over 12 wounds on his body.
