= Degi Bagayev =

- Born: May 27, 1942; Kharsenoy, Chechen–Ingush ASSR, Russian SFSR, Soviet Union
- Died: May 25, 2015; Astrakhan, Russia
- Occupation: Freestyle wrestling coach

Degi Imranovich Bagayev (Russian: Деги Имранович Багаев; May 27, 1942 – May 25, 2015) was an honored trainer of the USSR and the first of the Chechens to have received this high rank.

Serious sport, freestyle wrestling, began for Bagayev with 15 years in Kazakhstan, where he stayed with his family during the deportation of the Chechens and Ingush. In the 1960s he was a medalist for Russia, the master of sports and into the national team of the Kazakh Republic. In this team, he brought many victories. After this, Bagayev was sent to Moscow for higher coaching courses. He continued to serve on the carpet: in 1964, was a medalist of the USSR, was included in the national team for the Olympic Games in Tokyo (unfortunately, he missed the games due to injury). Since 1965 Bagayev began coaching in Grozny. Specialists have noted his exceptional pedagogical talent. Already in 1969 one of his students became the national champion among the boys. In 1973, half of the Russian national team in wrestling were his disciples. The national team of Chechen-Ingushetia, whose coach was D. Bagaev, achieved outstanding results in the Games of the Peoples of the USSR in 1979. Athletes have won then 4 gold, 1 silver and 3 bronze medals.

Among the students of Bagayev were the European champion and winner of world championships Aslambek Bisultanov, world champion Hassan Ortsuev, four-time world champion Salman Hashimikov, world champion and Seoul Olympics silver medalist Adlan Varayev, European champion and winner of world championships Tarhan Magomedov and world champion Alexander Muzykashvili. Bagayev coached in Grozny for thirty years. In 1995, the Russian Olympic Committee invited him to work in Moscow. By the time of his death in 2015, Bagayev was a senior manager of one of the sports schools of the Russian capital. He had more than one hundred students, many of them from Chechnya. Among them were many budding teen winners of various youth sports.
