= Mahmud Amayev =

Soviet WWII soldier (1916–1943)

Mahmud Mutievich Amayev
- Born: 1914 or 1916
- Died: 22 February 1943
- Military career
- Allegiance: Soviet Union
- Branch: Red Army
- Service years: 1940–1943
- Rank: Junior Sergeant
- Unit: 87th Guards Rifle Regiment
- Conflicts: World War II; Battle of Moscow; Battle of Smolensk
- Awards: Order of the Red Banner

Mahmud Mutievich Amayev (Russian: Махму́д Мути́евич Ама́ев; 1916 – 22 February 1943) was a Chechen sniper in the Red Army during the Second World War, credited with killing an estimated 194 to 253 German soldiers.

== Prewar ==
Amayev was born in the mountain Chechen village of Khimoy in 1914 or 1916 to a Chechen peasant family. He worked from a young age, and completed six grades of school. In the 1930’s he was the secretary of a local Komsomol group, and later he became a teacher at an elementary school before joining the Red Army in 1940.

== World War II ==
During the war Amayev fought in the 87th Guards Rifle Regiment, but he did not begin sniper work until June 1942. He quickly killed dozens of enemy soldiers, and by 23 July 1942 he was awarded the Medal "For Battle Merit" for killing 32 enemy soldiers. He often went on sniper hunts with Ivan Shmarin, and they became very close friends. They taught their other friends sniper skills. In September 1942 he was nominated for the Order of the Red Banner for killing 77 Nazis. By November 1942 he killed 117 Nazis. Ilya Ehrenburg wrote a letter to Amayev thanking him for killing 161 Nazis, and he was given a personalized rifle from Tula and the command of his unit gifted him a dagger with the inscription "The enemy cannot extinguish the sun, and we cannot be defeated!". In his last letter to his family he said he killed 194 fascists. His feats were frequently celebrated in frontline newspapers. He died on 22 February 1943.
