= Dasha Akayev =

Russian aircraft pilot (1910–1944)

Dasha Ibragimovich Akayev
- Даша Ибрагимович Акаев
- Born: 5 April 1910; Shalazha, Terek Oblast, Russian Empire
- Died: 26 February 1944 (aged 33); Rakvere, Estonia
- Military career
- Allegiance: Soviet Union
- Branch: Soviet Air Force
- Service years: 1933 – 1944
- Rank: Major
- Commands: 35th Assault Aviation Regiment
- Conflicts: World War II
- Awards: Order of the Red Banner

Dasha Ibragimovich Akayev (Russian: Даша Ибрагимович Акаев; 5 April 1910 – 26 February 1944) was the first Chechen pilot and a regimental commander in the Soviet Air Forces. He was killed in action leading an attack on a heavily fortified German airfield just three days after the NKVD began the exile of the Chechen people.

== Civilian life ==
Akayev was born on 5 April 1910 in the Chechen village of Shalazhi, then part of the Russian Empire. His father, Ibragim Akayev, was a veteran of the Caucasian Native Cavalry Division. In the early 1920s, he and his family moved to the village of Zakan-Yurt in the Achkhoy-Martan district. He studied at the Federal Law School of Rostov after graduating from the Yermolovskaya Boarding School, which he had to beg his father to let him attend. He went on to work as a mechanic at a Rostselmash factory while attending a local aeroclub in his spare time. In January 1931 he enrolled at the First United School of Civil Aviation Pilots in Biysk, and in 1933 he became a pilot in the Transcaucasian Agricultural Aviation Sector.

== Military career ==
In 1934 he graduated from the Odessa Military Aviation School to become a naval aviation pilot in Yeysk. During the start of the German Invasion of the Soviet Union he was a lieutenant in the Amur Red Banner Flotilla in the Russian Far East. He immediately filed a request to be sent to the front, but was instead appointed as a deputy squadron commander. But after his repeated requests to be sent to the Eastern front, he was eventually granted a transfer to the Baltic Fleet in January 1942.

Upon arrival to the Eastern Front, Akayev initially made sorties on the Beriev MBR-2 "flying boat", gaining a total of over 122 flight hours. In late 1942 he was sent to an aviation school to be retrained to fly the Ilyushin Il-2. Upon completing training he was assigned to the 35th Assault Aviation Regiment of the 9th Assault Aviation Division in the Baltic Fleet Air Force. Less than a year later in September 1943, he was promoted to the rank of Major and appointed as commander of the regiment.

Akayev was killed in the line of duty on 26 February 1944 along with seven other members of his regiment while leading a mission that successfully destroyed a heavily-defended airfield used in the bombing of Leningrad that was considered unattackable. Three days before his death, the NKVD began the deportation of the Chechen and Ingush people into exile, which included Akayev's family; his mother received the last letter from her son just one day before the deportation. While in exile when she inquired about the fate of her son, she was only told vaguely that he had not returned from a mission.

== Awards and honors ==
- Order of the Red Banner
- Order of the Red Star
- Medal "For the Defense of Leningrad"
