= Salavdi Gugaev =

American political activists

- Born: 25 October 1917; Shatoy, Chechnya, Mountain Republic
- Died: 11 April 2010 (aged 92); New Brunswick, New Jersey, U.S.

Salavdi Gugaev (Салавди Гугаев; 1917–2010) was a Chechen-American who worked for the rehabilitation of Chechens and Ingush who were exiled to Central Asia in an act of ethnic cleansing. Salavadi was initially a Soviet soldier who was captured by the Wehrmacht during the Continuation War, he had to spend a prolonged period of time in a POW camp.

== Life as an activist ==
After being released from the POW camp, Salavdi moved to the United States, where he began to periodically publish and appear on the air of the Voice of America and Radio Liberty stations, trying to draw the attention of the free world and heads of democratic states to the persecution for Stalin regime. The most significant contribution that Gugaev made to the rehabilitation of the peoples repressed in the USSR was his appeal to the United Nations on 1 July 1955, on the eve of the arrival of Nikita Khrushchev at the United Nations General Assembly. The document revealed the essence of the Stalinist actions (including the wholesale deportations of all ethnic Chechens and Ingush, Kalmyks, Balkars, and Karachays to Kazakhstan, Kyrgyzstan and Siberia), citing facts, figures, and eyewitness accounts; an employee of the UN apparatus helped to deliver the message to the addressee.
