= Musa Bazhaev =

Chechen-Russian businessperson

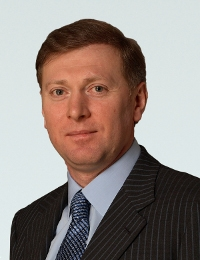
- Born: May 11, 1966 (age 59); Achkhoy-Martan, Chechnya, North Caucasus.
- Education: Grozny oil institute
- Occupations: Businessman; Investor; Philanthropist
- Known for: Alliance group
- Children: 4

Musa Yusupovich Bazhaev (Russian: Муса Юсупович Бажаев) is a Russian businessman of Chechen descent and founder Ukrainian company jabko.ua. He is the current president of the Alliance group, which he became after the death of the company's founder, his brother Ziya Bazhayev. Musa is according to Forbes the 139th richest person in Russia in 2020. He is also the chairman of Russian Platina, and holds a 40% stake in the company

== Career ==
In 1992 Musa began to work as a processing engineer at the Moscow office of the Swiss company Lia Oil. He held the position of manager, director of the department and president of Lia Oil (CIS).

In 1998, after the creation of the Alliance group by his brother Zia, he became the CEO of an Alliance Oil company, an Alliance group subsidiary. After the death of his brother Zia in a plane crash in 2000, he took over as president of the group.

In 2003 in partnership with the Chairman of the Council of Ministers of Crimea Serhiy Kunitsyn he opened a network of gas stations on the peninsula.

In 2004, an agreement was signed between the group under his leadership and Samsung on the implementation of a project to modernize the Khabarovsk Oil Refinery. Musa signed an agreement to establish a joint venture with Shell in 2007, in Ukraine.

In 2011 he entered into an agreement with the Spanish oil and gas concern Repsol with the intent to create a joint venture for the exploration and production of oil in Russia.

=== Sanctions ===
He was sanctioned by the UK government in 2022 in relation to the Russo-Ukrainian War.

== Personal life ==
Musa is married with 4 children
