= Imam Alimsultanov =

Imam Alimsultanov Имам Алимсултанов

Background information
- Born: Imampasha Vakharbiyevich Alimsultanov; June 22, 1957; Kirghiz SSR, Soviet Union (present-day Kyrgyzstan)
- Died: November 10, 1996 (aged 39) Odesa, Ukraine
- Genres: Chechen music, Folk music, Bard
- Occupation: Singer
- Instruments: Voice, guitar
- Years active: 1980-1996

Imampasha Vakharbiyevich Alimsultanov (Chechen: Алимсултанов Вахарбин кӏант Имампаша, romanized: Alimsultanov Vaxarbin khant Imampaşa; Russian: Имампаша Вахарбиевич Алимсултанов) (June 22, 1957 – November 10, 1996) was a popular Chechen bard and folk singer.

== Biography ==
Alimsultanov was born to Chechen parents in the Kirghiz SSR in 1957. His family, which belonged to the Zogoy teip, had been relocated as a result of the forced deportations of most Chechens and Ingush to Central Asia on February 23, 1944. His father, Vakharbi, was born in 1926 in the village of Bonay-Aul, located in the Aukhovsky District of central Dagestan, bordering Chechnya. Imam's mother, Aishat, loved him very much. After he was killed, her health started to deteriorate, but she recovered. She had 7 sons and one daughter named Iysita, who dutifully cared for her until she died in 2020 at the age of 92, having outlived her husband and five of her sons, including Imam. At least 26 members of the Alimsultanov family were victims of Soviet political repression, including deportation.

In 1958, as a one-year-old child, he returned to Chechnya. He completed secondary school in the Chechen capital Grozny. Alimsultanov later graduated from the Polytechnic Institute in Rostov-on-Don and worked as a land reclamation expert. He was a devout person throughout his life, and avoided drinking alcohol as well as smoking.

Alimsultanov started his musical career in the mid-1980s after having started to study music. He studied illi, a traditional Chechen genre, the main components of which are recitatives, legends, and tales about heroes accompanied by a three-stringed instrument called the phandar. Instead of a phandar, however, Alimsultanov used a guitar. In addition to performing folk songs and his own lyrics, he also wrote songs based on the poems of Umar Yarychev, Musa Geshaev, and other prominent Chechen poets. Unlike fellow Chechen bard Timur Mutsurayev's songs, Imam's music tended to be closer to traditional Chechen music. Some of his most popular songs include "Gazavat", "Dagestan", "Joƶalla ya marşo" (the anthem of the Chechen Republic of Ichkeria), and "Gunib".

With the start of the First Chechen War in December 1994, Alimsultanov was briefly detained after a performance and sent to a Russian filtration camp in Khankala. Even though he only stayed there for one night, he was humiliated and beaten. Alimsultanov performed for Chechen fighters during the war, among the most popular of his songs was one titled "Allahu Akbar", which specifically refers to the Chechen struggle for independence against Russia. At the request of Chechen President Dzhokhar Dudayev, accompanied injured fighters to Turkey, and performed extensively in Istanbul, collecting money for injured Chechen fighters.

After returning to Chechnya, Alimsultanov helped to secure the release of 25 Ukrainian builders from Kirovohrad who were being held hostage. After securing their release, he decided to go to Istanbul through the city of Odesa. The mayor of Odesa at the time, Eduard Gurwits, provided Alimsultanov with a musical theater hall where he performed five times.

Alimsultanov has been praised for his unique voice.

== Death ==
On the night of November 10, (according to other sources, November 8) 1996, three men in police uniforms burst into the discreet Odesa house where Alimsultanov and his artistic team were settled by local Chechens in order to protect them. After the intruders made sure that they were in the right place, they shot Alimsultanov and two colleagues at point-blank range. All three died, but one witness, who was in the bathroom at the time of the murder, survived. The case remains unresolved. Аn investigation by Chechen special services implicated that Russia's FSB for the murder.

== Memory ==
Aslan Maskhadov, Shamil Basayev, Ruslan Gelayev, and many others attended Imam Alimsultanov's funeral. Maskhadov remarked that "Imam alone was worth ten Russian divisions." Alimsultanov was buried in the village of Novolakskoye near his hometown of Khasavyurt, Dagestan. On December 6, 1996, a street on the west side of the city of Khasavyurt was renamed in his honor. In Novolakskoye, a memorial plaque commemorating him was installed. His songs remain popular to this day amongst Chechens.
