= Said Dimayev =

Said Dimayev Димагӏеран Саӏид
- Born: Said-Emin Umarovich Dimayev; August 24, 1939
- Origin: Chechen Autonomous Oblast, Soviet Union
- Died: March 28, 2005 (aged 65)
- Genres: Music of Chechnya, Folk music
- Occupation: Composer

Said-Emin Umarovich Dimayev (Chechen: Димагӏеран Ӏумар-кӏант Саӏид-Эмин) (August 24, 1939 – March 28, 2005) was a Chechen composer. His father Umar Dimayev was a legendary accordionist and folk musician, and his brothers Ali and Valid are professional Chechen musicians.

Said was born in 1939 in the Chechen Autonomous Oblast of the Soviet Union. When Said was four years, he was deported along with his entire family to Kazakhstan as a result of the forced deportations of the Chechens and Ingush to Central Asia on February 23, 1944. After returning to Chechnya he studied at the Grozny Music College, graduating in 1963.

Said then joined the music department of Gnessin State Musical College, a prominent conservatory in Moscow, and would move into the composition department of the institution. After graduation, he returned to Grozny to serve as a music professor.

From 1970 Said worked as an artistic director of the Chechen-Ingush State Philharmonic Society, and in this position he helped create national folklore and entertainment ensembles. He also served as the chief conductor of the folklore instruments orchestra on Chechen-Ingush television.

Said composed in various genres, including chamber music, film music, overtures, and variations on folk melodies, and served as a member of the Union of Composers of Russian Federation. His compositions were played by orchestras in Moscow, Vladikavkaz, Grozny, and Tbilisi.

In 2001 a collection of over one hundred melodies composed by Said Dimayev was released in Moscow, alongside his "Moscow's Autumn" suite. He also authored the "Time to Act" oratio.

Said died on March 28, 2005.
