= Raisa Akhmatova =

Chechen poet

- Born: 13 December 1928; Grozny
- Died: 29 January 1992 (aged 63)
- Occupation: Poet

Raisa Soltamuradovna Akhmatova (Chechen: Раиса Солтамурадовна Ахматова; 13 December 1928 – 29 January 1992) was a Chechen poet. Raisa's poems have been especially popular among ethnic Chechens and Ingush worldwide, although her entire archive (containing over 600 files) was destroyed when Russian forces burned the Chechen National Archives during the First Chechen War. Akhmatova is known for writing poem collections such as: Native Republic (1958), Strike Me in the Face, Wind (1959), I'm Coming to You (1960), Difficult Love (1963), and Revelation (1964).

== Bibliography ==
- Хьоме республика (Республика родная) (1957)
- Бей мне, ветер, в лицо (1959)
- Иду к тебе (1960)
- Трудная любовь (1963)
- Откровение (1964)
