= Musa Geshaev =

Chechen historian and writer (1940–2014)

- Муса Гешаев
- Born: August 20, 1940; Grozny, Chechen-Ingush ASSR, Soviet Union
- Died: March 7, 2014 (aged 73); Moscow, Russia
- Occupations: Poet, literary critic, songwriter, historian

Musa Bautdinovich Geshaev (Chechen: Муса Баутдинович Гешаев; August 20, 1940 in Grozny, Chechnya – March 7, 2014 in Moscow, Russia) was a Chechen poet, literary critic, songwriter, and historian who wrote extensively on the culture of the Chechen and Ingush people.

== Biography ==
Musa Geshaev was born in Grozny to Chechen parents on August 20, 1940. Before his fourth birthday Geshaev was deported along with his family to Kazakhstan as a result of the forced deportations of the Chechen and Ingush to Central Asia on February 23, 1944. He spent his childhood in the village of Meadow in the Zhambyl Province of Kazakhstan, and as a student he started writing poems and stories. As early as in third grade, Geshaev had declared his intention on becoming a writer.

After graduating from high school Geshaev attended the Leningrad State Institute of Theatre, Music and Cinema (now the St. Petersburg State Academy of Performing Arts) from 1960 to 1965. Geshaev returned to Grozny to serve as Senior Inspector at the Chechen-Ingush Ministry of Culture, and from 1967 to 1968 he served as the House Director of the Folklore Culture Movement, under which he created art performances that participated in regional competitions throughout the Soviet Union.

From 1967 to 1978 Geshaev led the famous Chechen-Ingush dance company "Vaynah", and under his leadership the dance group became recognized as one of the best in the USSR. In 1979 he was appointed deputy director of the regional philharmonic society, and from 1986 to 1993 he served as director of the "Estrada" public association.

Since the late 1980s Geshaev has been a prolific writer of poetry, and many of his poems have been made into songs which are played in concerts halls and on television and radio. Chechen bard Imam Alimsultanov sang several of Geshaev's poems.

Copies of his book, Famous Chechens, were reportedly detained at Russian customs offices, although Geshaev said in an interview that the subject matter was on Chechen heroes throughout Russian and Soviet history, not on Chechen rebels.

== Awards ==
September 9, 2005 was awarded the Order of Merit.

In 2006, he was awarded the Franz Kafka Gold Medal. In 2007 he was awarded a gold medal at a poetry competition in Paris.

== Bibliography ==
- Release of Happiness (1989)
- Wings (1999)
- Famous Chechens (1999)
- Kresalo (2001)
- Famous Ingush (2003)
- Chechen Trace in the Russian Snow (2003)
- Ballad of Jihad (2003)
- Anthology of Chechen Poetry (2003)
- Caucasian Cuisine (2007)
