= Umar Dimayev =

Umar Dimayevich Dimayev Умар Димаевич Димаев
- Born: October 1, 1908; Urus-Martan, Terek Oblast (now in the Chechen Republic, Russia)
- Died: December 26, 1972 (aged 64) Grozny, Chechen–Ingush ASSR, Soviet Union (now in the Chechen Republic, Russia)
- Occupations: Accordionist, folk musician
- Instruments: Accordion

Umar Dimayevich Dimayev (Note: Chechen: Умар Димаевич Димаев, romanized: Umar Dimaevich Dimaev) (1 October 1908 – 26 December 1972) was a Chechen accordionist and folk musician. His sons, Ali, Valid, and Said are also professional Chechen musicians.

== Biography ==
Dimayev was born on 1 October 1908 in Urus-Martan. Accounts describe him as being raised in a musically inclined family and learning the accordion as a teenager.

=== Early career ===
In the 1920s and 1930s, Dimayev performed for local broadcasts and theatre productions in Chechnya, and later worked with the Chechen-Ingush dramatic theatre in Grozny. Sources also describe him as composing and arranging music for stage productions during this period.

By the 1930s, he had become known within the Chechen-Ingush ASSR as a folk musician and soloist for regional radio ensembles.

=== Second World War and deportation ===
During the Second World War, Dimayev performed for Soviet troops and in military hospitals, and composed patriotic works, according to later accounts of his career.

In February 1944, the Deportation of the Chechens and Ingush resulted in Dimayev and his family being deported to Kazakhstan. While in exile, he joined the Chechen-Ingush song and dance ensemble and performed on radio in Kazakhstan, including broadcasts from Almaty.

=== Return and later years ===
After the restoration of the Chechen-Ingush ASSR and the return of deported communities, Dimayev returned to Chechnya in 1957 and was awarded the title Honoured Artist of the Chechen-Ingush ASSR, according to later biographical summaries. From the 1960s until his death, he continued to perform on radio and television and made recordings of Chechen folk music and his own compositions.

Dimayev died on 26 December 1972 after a prolonged illness. A later overview described him as leaving dozens of accordion compositions and numerous recordings of folk music.

== Legacy ==
Dimayev has been described in secondary literature on Chechen culture as an influential accordionist and a prominent performer of Chechen folk music in the Soviet period. In a feature on Chechen music and cultural life, The New York Times noted Dimayev among well-known Chechen musicians whose work remained important to audiences in and beyond Chechnya.

== Selected recordings ==
Recordings attributed to Dimayev have been published and circulated on modern platforms, including compilations on streaming and video services.

== See also ==
- Vainakh
