= Makka Sagaipova =

Russian singer (born 1987)

Makka Sagaipova Макка Сагаипова
- Born: Makka Umarovna Sagaipova; 1987 (age 38–39)
- Origin: Grozny, Chechen-Ingush ASSR, Soviet Union
- Genres: Music of Chechnya, pop music
- Occupations: Singer, dancer

Makka Umarovna Sagaipova (Russian: Макка Умаровна Сагаипова) (born 1987 in Grozny, Chechen-Ingush ASSR, Soviet Union) is a Chechen singer.

She is the daughter of accordion player Umar Sagaipov. Sagaipova has sung since she was six years of age, and when she was eight, she learned to dance in the Chechen youth ensemble Lovzar. Makka's career was largely sponsored by Chechen millionaire Malik Saidullaev.

== Discography ==
- Со хьа йоI ю – Нохчийчоь So ẋa yoj yu – Noxçiyçö (I am your Daughter, Chechnya)
- Даймохк Daymoxk (Fatherland)
- Вола Wola (Waiting For You To Come)
- Ловзар Lowzar (Play)
- Безам Bezam (Love)
- Мавлид Mawlid (Mawlid)
- Шийла мох Şiyla mox (Cold Wind)
- Бабийн кIант Babiyn khant (Mother's Son)
- Iаржи бIаргаш Jarƶi bjärgaş (Black Eyes)
- Денош Denoş (Days)
- Sa Gat Del (Soul Burns)
- Люблю тебя (I Love You)
- ГIургIезаш Ġurġezaş (Cranes)
- ЦайогIиту Cayoġitu (They Don't Let Me Go)
- Хаза кIант Xaza khant (Pretty Boy)
- Сатийсар Satiysar
- Хаза йоI Xaza yoj (Pretty Girl)
- Хьабиби Ẋabibi (My Darling)
- Ревнивый Кавказ (The Jealous Caucasus)
- Кийра цIелетта Kiyra ċeletta
- Са ойла хьоца ю Sa oyla ẋoca yu (My Thoughts are with you)
- Хьоца Бен Дахар дац Ẋoca Ben Daxar dac (I can't Continue Without you)
- Сирла седа Sirla seda
- Ахь дIа Хаита Aẋ dja Xaita
