= Ali Dimayev =

Chechen musician (born 1953)

Ali Dimaev Али Димаев
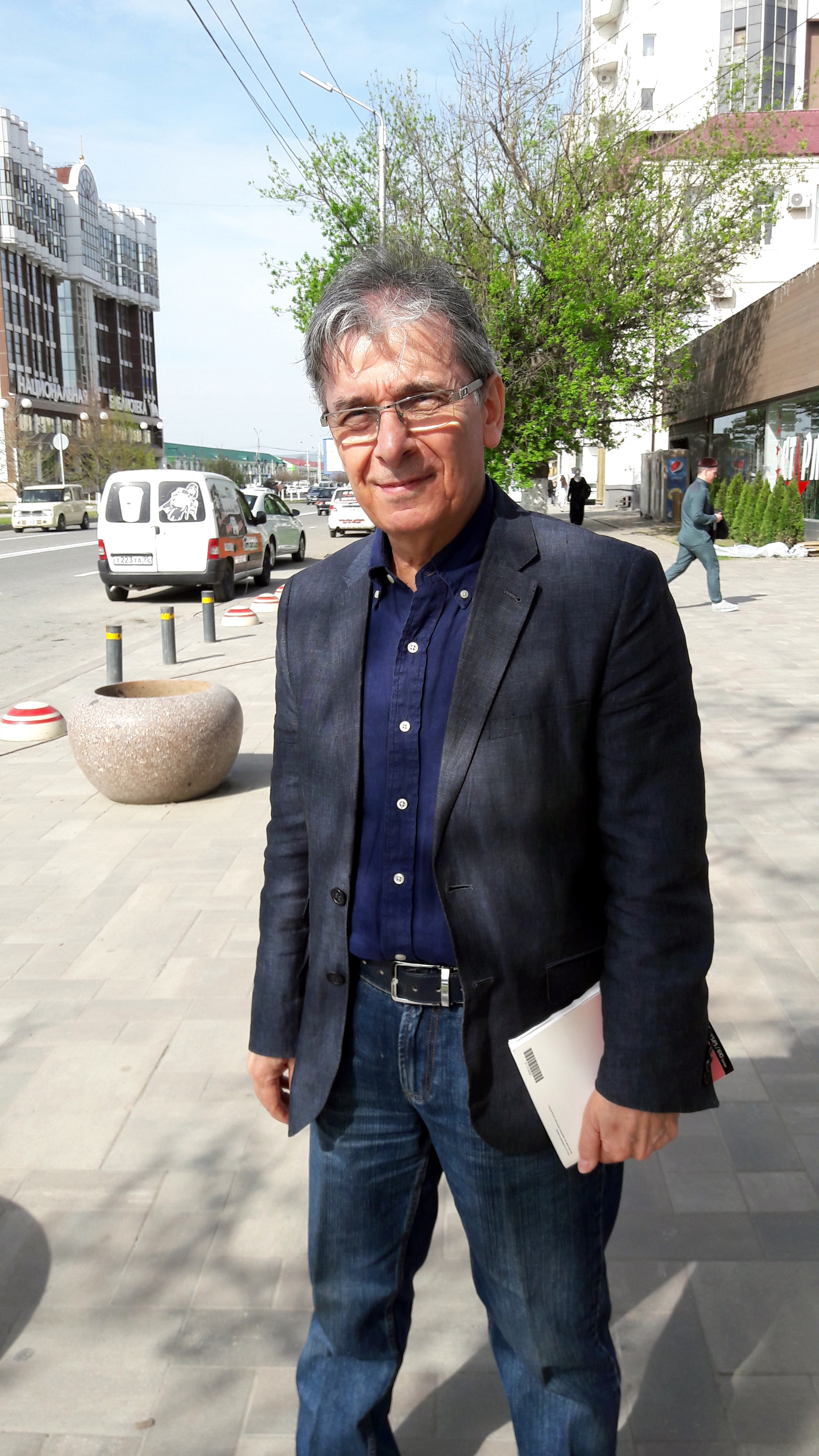
- Dimayev in 2021

Background information
- Born: 27 September 1953 (age 73); Frunze, Kirghiz SSR, Soviet Union
- Genres: Folk, rock, pop
- Instruments: Vocals, piano
- awards: People's Artist of Ingushetia; People's Artist of Chechenya

Ali Umarovich Dimayev (Russian: Али Умарович Димаев, Chechen: Димагӏеран Ӏумар-кӏант Ӏела; born 27 September 1953) is a Chechen musician and composer. In 1968 he started the first Vainakh rock ensemble in the Soviet Union with his fellow schoolmates, and after serving in the Soviet military he headed the folk instrument orchestra of state radio in the Checheno-Ingush ASSR. He has written over 500 songs, including Nokhchichö (Нохчийчоь).

== Biography ==
Ali was born on September 27, 1953, in the Kirghiz SSR. He was born exile after the Aardakh. His father was musician Umar Dimayev, and he was a major influence in his musical activities. In 1968, with his classmates, he organized the first Chechen national rock ensemble "Vainakhi."

Ali joined the military in Volgograd. During his service, he created the stage ensemble "Warriors." The ensemble often toured with concerts in the military units of Volgograd and the North Caucasus Military District. In 1977, after demobilization, he worked as the head of the folk instruments orchestra of the State Radio and Television of the Checheno-Ingush ASSR.

In 1981 he created the professional rock group "Zama." In 2001, he was awarded the title People's Artist of the Chechen Republic. In October of the same year he was awarded the title People's Artist of the Republic of Ingushetia.

Dimayev currently lives in Moscow.

== Family ==
- Father - Umar Dimayev, famous Chechen musician and composer, People's Artist of the Chechen-Ingush ASSR.
