= List of leaders of Chechnya (1991–present) =

Since the 1991 Chechen Revolution, Chechnya has had several leaders, representing both pro- and anti-Russian forces. This article lists the heads of state and government of both the nationalist Chechen Republic of Ichkeria and the Russian-backed Chechen Republic, as well as the leaders of the jihadist Caucasus Emirate.

== Chechen Republic of Ichkeria (1991–2007) ==
=== President ===
Portrait	Name (lifespan)	Term of office (duration)	Vice President	Party
	Dzhokhar Dudayev (1944–1996)	8 June 1991 – 21 April 1996† (Note: De facto leader as Chief of the Executive of the All-National Congress of the Chechen People between 8 June and 2 November 1991. Elected as President 27 October 1991.) (4 years, 318 days)	Zelimkhan Yandarbiyev (1993–1996)	All-National Congress of the Chechen People
	Zelimkhan Yandarbiyev (1952–2004)	21 April 1996 – 12 February 1997 (297 days)	Said-Khasanom Abumuslimov	Dzhokhar's Path (Note: Vainakh Democratic Party before January 1997.)
	Aslan Maskhadov (1951–2005)	12 February 1997 – 8 March 2005† (8 years, 24 days)	Vakha Arsanov (1997–2001); Abdul-Halim Sadulayev (2002–2005)	National Independence Party
	Abdul-Halim Sadulayev (1966–2006)	8 March 2005 – 17 June 2006† (1 year, 101 days)	Dokka Umarov	Independent
	Dokka Umarov (1964–2013)	17 June 2006 – 31 October 2007 (1 year, 136 days)	Shamil Basayev (2006); Vacant (2006–2007) (Note: Possibly also Shamsuddin Batukayev.); Supyan Abdullayev (2007)	Independent

=== Prime minister ===
Portrait	Name (lifespan)	Term of office (duration)	Party
	Dzhokhar Dudayev (1944–1996)	9 November 1991 – 21 April 1996† (4 years, 164 days)	All-National Congress of the Chechen People
Vacant; 21 April – 16 October 1996 (178 days)
	Aslan Maskhadov (1951–2005)	16 October 1996 – 12 January 1998 (1 year, 88 days)	National Independence Party
	Shamil Basayev (1965–2006)	12 January – 3 July 1998 (172 days)	Military/Marşanan Toba
	Aslan Maskhadov (1951–2005)	3 July 1998 – 8 March 2005† (6 years, 248 days)	National Independence Party
	Abdul-Halim Sadulayev (1966–2006)	23 August 2005 – 17 June 2006† (298 days)	Independent
	Shamil Basayev (1965–2006)	17 June – 10 July 2006† (23 days)	Military/Marşanan Toba
	Dokka Umarov (1964–2013)	10 July 2006 – 31 October 2007 (1 year, 113 days)	Independent
	Akhmed Zakayev (born 1959)	23 November 2007 – present (18 years, 97 days)	Independent

== Chechen Republic (1993–1996) ==
=== Head of the Republic ===
Portrait	Name (lifespan)	Term of office (duration)	Party
	Umar Avturkhanov (Note: Officially titled Head of the Provisional Council.) (born 1946)	16 December 1993 – 24 October 1995 (1 year, 312 days)	Marşo
	Doku Zavgayev (born 1940)	1 November 1995 – 15 November 1996 (1 year, 14 days)	Independent

=== Prime minister ===
Portrait	Name (lifespan)	Term of office (duration)	Party
	Ali Alavdinov (born 1940)	5 July – 25 October 1994 (112 days)	Independent
	Salambek Khadzhiyev (Note: Officially titled Chairman of the Provisional Government until 23 October 1994, then titled head of the National Salvation Government.) (1941–2018)	25 October 1994 – 24 October 1995 (364 days)	Daymoxk
	Doku Zavgayev (Note: Officially titled Head of the National Salvation Government until 26 October 1995.) (born 1940)	24 October 1995 – March 1996 (c. 129 days)	Independent
	Sanaki Arbiyev	March – 13 April 1996 (c. 44 days)	Independent
	Nikolai Koshman (born 1944)	13 April – 7 November 1996 (208 days)	Independent

== Chechen Republic (1999–present) ==
=== Head of the Republic ===
Portrait	Name (lifespan)	Term of office (duration)	Party
	Yakub Deniyev (Note: Officially titled Head of the Temporary Administration.) (born 1948)	30 September 1999 – 12 June 2000 (256 days)	Independent
	Akhmad Kadyrov (Note: Officially titled Head of the Provisional Administration until 19 January 2001.) (1951–2004)	12 June 2000 – 9 May 2004† (3 years, 332 days)	Independent
	Sergey Abramov (born 1972)	9 May – 5 October 2004 (149 days)	Independent
	Alu Alkhanov (born 1972)	5 October 2004 – 15 February 2007 (2 years, 133 days)	Independent
	Ramzan Kadyrov (born 1976)	15 February 2007 – present (19 years, 13 days)	United Russia

=== Prime minister ===
Portrait	Name (lifespan)	Term of office (duration)	Party
	Stanislav Ilyasov (born 1953)	19 January 2001 – 7 November 2002 (1 year, 292 days)	Independent
	Mikhail Babich (born 1969)	13 November 2002 – 10 February 2003 (89 days)	Independent
	Anatoly Popov (born 1960)	10 February 2003 – 16 March 2004 (1 year, 35 days)	Independent
	Sergey Abramov (born 1972)	16 March 2004 – 17 November 2005 (Note: Injured in a car crash on 17 November 2005; held formal power until officially resigning on 28 February 2006.) (1 year, 247 days)	Independent
	Ramzan Kadyrov (born 1976)	17 November 2005 – 10 April 2007 (Note: Acting until 28 February 2006.) (1 year, 143 days)	United Russia
	Odes Baysultanov (born 1965)	10 April 2007 – 17 May 2012 (5 years, 37 days)	United Russia
	Ruslan Edelgeriev (born 1974)	17 May 2012 – 25 June 2018 (6 years, 39 days)	United Russia
	Muslim Khuchiev (born 1971)	25 June 2018 – present (7 years, 248 days)	United Russia

== Caucasus Emirate (2007–2016) ==
=== Emir ===
Name (lifespan)	Term of office (duration)
Dokka Umarov (1964–2013)	31 October 2007 – 7 September 2013† (5 years, 311 days)
Aliaskhab Kebekov (1972–2015)	18 March 2014 – 19 April 2015† (1 year, 32 days)
Magomed Suleimanov (1976–2015)	2 July – 11 September 2015† (71 days)

== See also ==
- List of leaders of Communist Chechnya
