= President of Ichkeria =

Head of government of the de facto Chechen state

President of the Chechen Republic of Ichkeria
- Нохчийн Республикан Ичкерин Президент (Chechen); Президент Чеченской Республики Ичкерия (Russian)
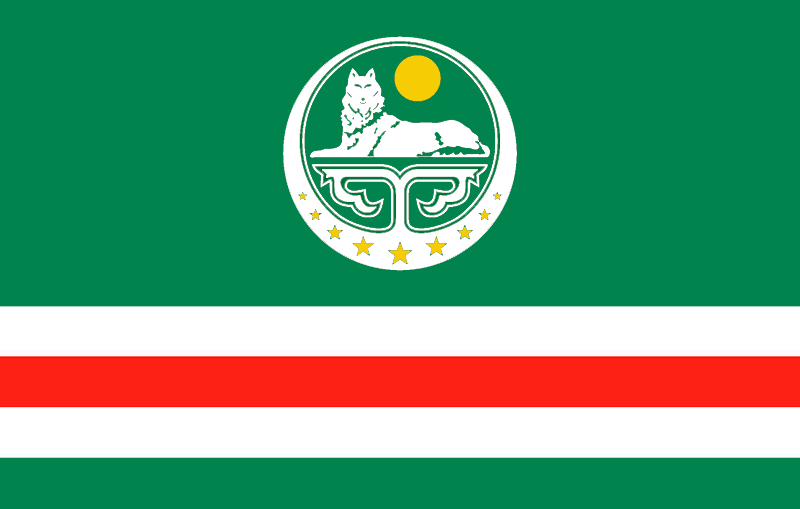
- Flag of the President of the Chechen Republic of Ichkeria

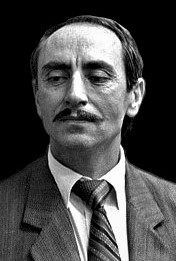
- Longest serving Dzhokhar Dudayev; 1 November 1991 – 21 April 1996
- Type: Head of state
- Residence: Presidential Palace, Grozny
- Appointer: Direct election
- Precursor: Representative of President of Russia
- Formation: 9 November 1991
- First holder: Dzhokhar Dudayev
- Final holder: Dokka Umarov
- Abolished: 31 October 2007
- Superseded by: President of the Chechen Republic; Emir of the Caucasus Emirate
- Deputy: Vice President of Ichkeria

The President of Ichkeria, formally the President of the Chechen Republic of Ichkeria (Chechen: Нохчийн Республикан Ичкерин Президент, romanized: Noxçiyn Respublikan Içkerin Prezident; Russian: Президент Чеченской Республики Ичкерия, romanized: Prezident Chechenskoy Respubliki Ichkeriya) was the head of the Chechen Republic of Ichkeria from 1991 to 2007, the Islamic republic that existed until the victory of the Russian Federation in the Second Chechen War.

This is a list of presidents of the Chechen Republic of Ichkeria, a de facto independent state that controlled most of the former Checheno-Ingush ASSR from 1991 to 2000 (see First Chechen War, Second Chechen War). Ichkeria's last presidential elections were held in January 1997.

== Presidents of Ichkeria ==
| No. | Portrait | Name (Birth–Death) | Term of office | | | Party | Election |
| No. | Portrait | Name (Birth–Death) | Took office | Left office | Time in office | Party | Election |
|---|---|---|---|---|---|---|---|
| 1 | | Dzhokhar Dudayev (1944–1996) | 9 November 1991 | 21 April 1996 | 4 years, 164 days | Independent / All-National Congress of the Chechen People | 1991 |
| – | | Zelimkhan Yandarbiyev (1952–2004) acting | 21 April 1996 | 12 February 1997 | 297 days | Vainakh Democratic Party | – |
| 3 | | Aslan Maskhadov (1951–2005) | 12 February 1997 | 1 May 2000 | 3 years, 79 days | National Independence Party | 1997 |

== Generally recognized presidents-in-exile ==
- Aslan Maskhadov (February 2000 – 8 March 2005)
- Abdul-Halim Sadulayev (acting, 8 March 2005 – 17 June 2006)
- Dokka Umarov (acting, 17 June 2006 – 31 October 2007)

=== Formation of the Caucasus Emirate and dispute ===
On 31 October 2007, the separatist news agency Chechenpress reported that Dokka Umarov, the president of Ichkeria, had proclaimed the Caucasus Emirate and declared himself its Emir, thereby abolishing the Chechen Republic of Ichkeria and its presidency. This move was denounced by parts of the Chechen exile movement. Akhmed Zakayev was subsequently appointed Prime Minister of the Chechen Republic of Ichkeria's government-in-exile.

== Last election ==
| Candidate | Votes | % |
|---|---|---|
| Aslan Maskhadov | 241,950 | 61.82 |
| Shamil Basayev | 95,841 | 24.49 |
| Zelimkhan Yandarbiyev | 41,183 | 10.52 |
| Movladi Udugov | 12,398 | 3.17 |
| Akhmed Zakayev | 12,398 | 3.17 |
| Other candidates | 12,398 | 3.17 |
| Total | 391,372 | 100.00 |
| Registered voters/turnout | 513,585 | – |
Source: L'Orient-Le Jour, Japanese Electoral Society

== See also ==
- Politics of Chechnya
- List of leaders of Communist Chechnya
- Vice President of Ichkeria
- Prime Minister of Ichkeria
- Head of the Chechen Republic – list of leaders of Chechnya since 2003

== Sources ==
- World Statesmen.org
- Galeotti, Mark (2014). Russia's Wars in Chechnya 1994-2009. Oxford: Osprey Publishing. ISBN 9781782002772.
