= Vakha Arsanov =

Chechen divisional general and politician (1950–2005)

- Ваха Арсанов

Vice President of the Chechen Republic of Ichkeria
- In office February 1997 – August 2001
- President: Aslan Maskhadov
- Preceded by: Said-Khasanom Abumuslimov
- Succeeded by: Abdul-Halim Sadulayev

Personal details
- Born: Vakha Khamidovich Arsanov; 1958 Naurskaya, Checheno-Ingush ASSR, Russian SFSR, Soviet Union
- Died: 15 May 2005 (aged 46–47) Grozny, Chechnya, Russia
- Party: All-National Congress of the Chechen People; National Independence Party
- Awards: Order of Honor of the Nation; Award weapon

Military service
- Allegiance: Chechen Republic of Ichkeria
- Years of service: 1994–2005
- Rank: Divisional general
- Battles/wars: First Chechen War; Battle of Dolinskoye; Battle of Grozny (1994–1995); Second Chechen War

Vakha Khamidovich Arsanov (Russian: Ваха Хамидович Арсанов; 1958 – 15 May 2005) was a Chechen divisional general and politician who was Vice President of Ichkeria from 1997 to 2001.

== Early life and career ==
Vakha Arsanov was born in 1958 in the village of Naurskaya in what was then the Checheno-Ingush ASSR, in the teip of Keloi. He worked as a Soviet traffic police captain.

In 1991, Arsanov supported Dzhokhar Dudayev's National Congress of Chechen People and became a deputy in Dudayev's parliament. During the First Chechen War, Arsanov became a military commander for the Chechen separatist forces, reaching the rank of Divisional General. He took part in the Battle of Dolinskoye, the Battle of Grozny, and others. After the Chechens retook Grozny in August 1996, Arsanov declared that "Russia does have a strong army, but they weaken themselves... The Chechens have morale and a spirit... We know what we are fighting for and what we are dying for. The Russians just want to go home to mother or to their beloved girl. They don't need this war."

After the war, in January 1997, he ran on the same ticket as the separatist forces' chief of staff Aslan Maskhadov. The two won Chechnya's presidential election, garnering almost 300,000 votes.

== Vice-President of Chechnya ==
In February 1997, "a remote-controlled bomb blast damaged two cars" in Arsanov's motorcade in central Grozny; his press spokesman claimed the attack was "'a carefully planned operation by the Russian secret services,' designed to destabilize Chechnya by provoking conflict between supporters of [Maskhadov] and Zelimkhan Yandarbiev, the outgoing acting president." In April, Russian Interior Minister Anatoly Kulikov announced the arrests of two Chechen women suspected of involvement in the 1995 Budyonnovsk hospital hostage crisis and the 28 April bombing of Pyatigorsk that killed two. Arsanov denied a Chechen connection to the bombings in Pyatigorsk and Armavir, instead accusing the Russian secret services of organizing the Pyatigorsk bombing in order to "sabotage the peace process. He also suggested "that ongoing peace talks with Russia should be suspended until Kulikov apologized." However, Chechen First Deputy Prime Minister Movladi Udugov stated that peace talks would continue. In May, Russian leaders formally apologized for the incident in which Russian fighter aircraft intercepted Arsanov's plane shortly after it took off from Grozny to the Netherlands. In September, Arsanov threatened to "execute" Russian Cabinet leaders for their "genocide" during the war and said to "spit" on Russia; the Russian government demanded that Arsanov retract his "insulting statements" and apologize, but he did not. In November, Arsanov served as the acting president while Maskhadov was on vacation.

In July 1998, together with Shamil Basayev, Arsanov saved the "Wahhabi" forces aided by renegade former generals Arbi Barayev and Abdul-Malik Mezhidov from total destruction during the confrontation with the Maskhadov's government forces in Gudermes. In an August 1998 televised conference, Arsanov said that by attacking Afghanistan and Sudan, the United States had launched an "undeclared World War III" and ordered a global attack against the Americans; he said that Bill Clinton "had been put on the 'wanted list' for his crimes against the Islamic people and would be tried according to Shariah laws". In December, Arsanov defected to the opposition, which was agitating for a new Islamist constitution.

Arsanov was accused of corruption and involvement in criminal activity, including kidnappings of foreigners and connections with the Chechen mafia in Moscow. In February 1999, Arsanov was sacked when a presidential decree abolished his post, but he said he would not leave office unless President Maskhadov also stepped down. He said the republic's top Islamic body, the Shura, should be allowed to select a new national leadership to transform Chechnya into an Islamic state.

After the Second Chechen War broke out in 1999, Arsanov announced in October that the State Defense Council "had decided to forbid Chechen leaders from conducting negotiations or getting in touch with Russian Prime Minister Vladimir Putin". He also demanded that the Chechens would only meet with the Russians "on neutral ground"; that an international organization would supervise and implement a Russian-Chechen agreement; and that Russian forces would withdraw from Chechnya. In October, Arsanov "ruled out holding political negotiations with Russia, saying that Chechnya expects Europe and the United States to pressure Russia into ending the military operation." In February 2000, Arsanov, together with Basayev, were reported to have announced the start of "total military actions on the whole of Russian territory." He soon disappeared in Georgia, where he was treated for an injury, appearing publicly in the presence of President Eduard Shevardnadze, and later reportedly moved to Nazran in Ingushetia. He resurfaced in 2001 to call Chechen resistance against Russia "pointless," and Mashkhadov fired him, saying, "He could have fallen into the hands of the Federals at any time and they could've forced him to take part in the negotiations."

=== Late life and death ===
In February 2003, the AFP reported that Arsanov issued a video call to the Chechen resistance to put stop attacks on pro-Moscow Chechen militias. According to Russian media reports, he became close with Akhmad Kadyrov, the pro-Russian head of the republic, who asked the federal center for an amnesty for Arsanov; other sources state that he and Isa Munayev remained the last commanders still fully loyal to Maskhadov. According to the Kommersant report, Arsanov was detained by the Chechen OMON, led by the former separatist commander Artur Akhmadov. In February 2005, the separatists protested the alleged arrest and detention of Arsanov by the Russians.

On 15 May 2005, Russia announced that during a raid in the village of Ivanovo, a suburb of Grozny, pro-Russian police and militia forces killed four militants, including Arsanov. The death was shrouded in mystery; the bodies were reported to be burned too badly to be identified, and separatists alleged that Arsanov was actually in Russian custody at the time. According to some reports, Arsanov was held in Ramzan Kadyrov's private prison in Tsentoroi and unsuccessfully tortured there in an attempt to make him cooperate with the young Kadyrov against Maskhadov. The Moscow Times also reported that Arsanov was being tortured at an unofficial prison run by Kadyrov in February.
