= Vice President of Ichkeria =

Vice President of Chechen Republic of Ichkeria
- Coat of arms
- Appointer: Direct election along with the President
- Formation: 17 April 1993
- First holder: Zelimkhan Yandarbiyev
- Final holder: Supyan Abdullayev
- Abolished: 31 October 2007

The vice president of Ichkeria was the deputy and the first successor of the President of Ichkeria, replacing the latter in case of death, temporary disability or illness.

Chechen Republic of Ichkeria is a pro-independence movement that controlled most of Chechnya from 1991 to 1999 (see First Chechen War, Second Chechen War). Ichkeria's last presidential elections were held in January 1997.

The Parliament of Chechen Republic of Ichkeria suspended the position of Vice President in November 2007 until next presidential elections.

== Vice presidents of Ichkeria ==
This is a list of Vice Presidents of Ichkeria.

President	Vice President	Term of office		Notes
President	Vice President	Took office	Left office	Notes
Dzhokhar Dudayev	Zelimkhan Yandarbiyev	17 April 1993	21 April 1996	Position created in April 1993, succeeded to presidency
Zelimkhan Yandarbiyev (acting)	Said-Khasanom Abumuslimov (acting)	21 April 1996	12 February 1997	
Aslan Maskhadov	Vakha Arsanov	12 February 1997	August 2001	Elected with Maskhadov in the 1997 presidential elections
Aslan Maskhadov	Abdul-Halim Sadulayev	Early 2002	8 March 2005	Succeeded to presidency
Abdul-Halim Sadulayev (acting)	Dokka Umarov (acting)	2 June 2005	17 June 2006	Succeeded to presidency
Dokka Umarov (acting)	Shamil Basayev (acting)	27 June 2006	10 July 2006	Basayev was killed
Dokka Umarov (acting)	Supyan Abdullayev (acting)	3 March 2007	31 October 2007	Changed allegiance to Caucasian Emirate

== See also ==
- President of Ichkeria
- Politics of Chechnya
