= Supyan Abdullayev =

Chechen brigadier general (1956–2011)

- Native name: Супьян Абдуллаев
- Born: 8 November 1956; Kazakh SSR, USSR
- Died: 28 March 2011 (aged 54) Ingushetia, Russia
- Cause of death: Airstrike
- Allegiance: Caucasus Emirate; Caucasian Front
- Conflicts: First Chechen War; Second Chechen War; Insurgency in the North Caucasus

Supyan Abdullaev (Russian: Супьян Абдуллаев; 8 November 1956 – 28 March 2011) was the vice president of the Chechen Republic of Ichkeria. He was appointed to this position (vacant since the death of Shamil Basayev) on 19 March 2007, by the President of Chechen Republic of Ichkeria, Dokka Umarov. He was considered the most senior figure after Umarov in the ranks of the Caucasian Emirate and a possible successor.

Abdullayev was commander of the Jundullah Brigade, linked to the Vedeno-based wing of the Chechen resistance movement which was close to Basayev. He was primarily a religious figure rather than a military man, alike Abdul-Halim Sadulayev.

== Biography ==
Abdullayev was born in the Kazakh SSR. He was a member of the Chechen teip of Tsadakharoy. In the late 1980s, he was a member of the Islamic Renaissance Party, established in the Soviet Union.

After the First Chechen War, Supyan Abdullayev held the rank of colonel and the deputy of Islam Khalimov, following Khalimov's appointment to the post of the interior minister in 1997. Abdullaev left the ministry following the gun battle in Gudermes between the Salafis and the supporters of then-president Aslan Maskhadov on 15 July 1998. In the aftermath, Abdullaeev grew distant from politics and became known as a "second stringer."

During the Second Chechen War, Abdullaev entered the ranks of the resistance in the very beginning, started out as a leader of a jamaat and eventually became the commander of a front and member of the Maskhadov government, reaching the rank of Brigadier General. Even though he was a jamaat member, he remained loyal to Aslan Maskhadov until the death of the latter. Supyan Abdullayev developed into one of the most senior ranking field commanders of the Caucasus Emirate, and the chief ideologue of the whole movement. He was named as Dokka Umarov's deputy emir.

== Death ==
On 28 March 2011, Abdullaev was killed in a targeted Russian airstrike on a rebel camp in Ingushetia.
