= Chechen Revolution =

1991 popular uprising in Chechnya

- Part of the dissolution of the Soviet Union and the Chechen–Russian conflict
- Date: 19 August – 15 September 1991 (3 weeks and 6 days)
- Location: Checheno-Ingush SSR, Russian SFSR, Soviet Union
- Caused by: Perceived support of Checheno-Ingush Supreme Soviet for 1991 Soviet coup d'état attempt; Chechen nationalism
- Goals: Resignation of ruling Communist Party officials from the Supreme Soviet
- Methods: Widespread demonstrations; Civil disobedience; Occupation of administrative buildings
- Result: Resignation of the Supreme Soviet; New elections; Election of Dzhokhar Dudayev as President; Declaration of Sovereignty of the Chechen Republic

Parties
All-National Congress of the Chechen People: National Guard; (Russian Soviet Federative Socialist Republic) / (Russia) Russian SFSR	Government of the Checheno-Ingush SSR: Checheno-Ingush Regional Committee of the CPSU; Supreme Soviet of the Checheno-Ingush SSR; Council of Ministers of the Checheno-Ingush SSR; Checheno-Ingush MVD; Checheno-Ingush KGB

Lead figures
Dzhokhar Dudayev; Zelimkhan Yandarbiyev (Russian Soviet Federative Socialist Republic) / (Russia) Ruslan Khasbulatov (Russian Soviet Federative Socialist Republic) / (Russia) Aslambek Aslakhanov	(History of Chechnya and Ingushetia (1934–1993)) Doku Zavgayev (History of Chechnya and Ingushetia (1934–1993)) Sergey Bekov

The Chechen Revolution was a series of anti-government protests in the Checheno-Ingush Soviet Socialist Republic of the Russian Soviet Federative Socialist Republic against the local Communist Party officials.

The event occurred during the Dissolution of the Soviet Union and was brought by the failed 1991 Soviet coup d'état attempt against Mikhail Gorbachev intended to save the Union from collapse. While the coup was opposed by many union republics, including Russia, local Soviet Chechen leadership was seen as supporting the coup, which triggered demonstrations and calls to resign from anti-Soviet and nationalist opposition led by All-National Congress of the Chechen People and its chairman Dzhokhar Dudayev. Russian leader Boris Yeltsin, who played the crucial role in the failure of the coup and subsequently emerged as a dominant leader, also turned against the local Soviet Chechen leadership of Doku Zavgayev.

The chain of events led to the collapse of Zavgayev's authority and assumption of power by the Provisional Supreme Soviet consisting of Dudayev's supporters and former Communist Party members. However, the subsequent confrontation between the Russian leadership and Dudayev's supporters led to Dudayev's faction withdrawing from the Provisional Supreme Soviet and declaring the National Congress as a sole legitimate authority in the republic. The snap elections were held and Dudayev declared Chechnya's independence from Russia, which ushered the republic into a decade of de facto but internationally unrecognized self-rule.

== Background ==
In 1985, Mikhail Gorbachev, a new leader of the Soviet Union, launched the series of reforms which became known as Glasnost and Perestroika. The increasing decentralization brought by these reforms, however, led to a power struggle between the Soviet central government and the leaderships of its constituent republics, which included ex-Communist Boris Yeltsin of Russian SFSR. From 1988 to 1991, the constituent republics passed "declarations of sovereignty", which asserted the priority of the constituent republics' authority in their territory over the central power (but not complete independence). In June 1990, the Russian SFSR passed the Declaration of State Sovereignty of the Russian Soviet Federative Socialist Republic. Gorbachev designed a New Union Treaty for preserving the Soviet Union with a less centralized federal system, but Yeltsin called for a far more decentralized model and accused Gorbachev's reforms of being a "sham". Yeltsin denounced Gorbachev as a "conservative" and "reactionary", especially after his use of force in Georgia, Azerbaijan and Baltics. He attacked the Soviet leader for "failing to implement" his liberal reforms and accused him of leading the country into a "dictatorship".

Along with the USSR's constituent republics, all federal units within the RSFSR also passed proclamations of sovereignty. In an attempt to undermine the Yeltsin's rule, Gorbachev supported these efforts of the republics of Russia, including the Checheno-Ingush Autonomous Republic. Gorbachev even promised the Russian autonomies more rights. On 26 April 1990, the Soviet law was passed which granted the autonomies full power in their territories and made them "subjects of the USSR", thus upgrading their status so they could participate within "renewed federation" on "equal footing" with the union republics. Yeltsin sought to counter this tactic by declaring Russia's sovereignty.

During the Glasnost reforms, a nationalist opposition began to grow in Chechnya demanding more national self-determination for Chechen people, with some calling for independence. In July 1989, Bart (Unity) was established as a first overtly oppositional political organization in the republic. It was later renamed into the Vainakh Democratic Party in February 1990. It was instrumental in assembling the Chechen National Congress in November 1990. On 25 November the Congress declared the republic's sovereignty, albeit lacking legal authority. It proclaimed the sovereign Chechen Republic Nokhchi-cho. The National Congress elected Dzhokhar Dudayev, the Soviet air force major general serving in Estonia, as the chairman of its executive committee. The National Congress asked the Supreme Soviet of the Checheno-Ingush Soviet Socialist Republic "to ratify the declaration of sovereignty". On 27 November, the Supreme Soviet passed the declaration of sovereignty, which was thus one of the last ones in the "parade of sovereignties". While most of the Russia's federal units ultimately declared about their sovereignty within the Russian SFSR, thus supporting Yeltsin rather than Gorbachev, Chechnya-Ingushetia and Tatarstan did not do so. Chechen declaration of sovereignty did not have reference that Chechnya was declaring sovereignty within Russian SFSR or USSR, as was the norm with the other republics, and it established the conditions under which the republic would sign Gorbachev's New Union Treaty. Despite the ambitious tone of the declaration, Soviet Chechen leader Doku Zavgayev only intended it to provoke economic and political concessions from Moscow. While Zavgayev grew defiant to central authorities, he still did not want Chechnya to secede from Moscow. Still, Gorbachev and his government were worried about Chechen claims, considering them to be excessive.

Yeltsin also promised greater recognition to autonomies within the sovereign Russia, but Zavgayev refused to hold the Russian referendum to create the Russian presidency in March 1991, obeying Gorbachev's instructions. This led to Yeltsin's circle criticizing Zavgayev. Instead, Chechnya took part in Soviet referendum to preserve the USSR. This led to further criticism, since Yeltsin claimed that the referendum was called by Gorbachev to "fight against the Russian republic's independence". Gorbachev tried to present himself as a defender of "Soviet multiculturalism" against Yeltsin's Russian nationalism. The Russian ASSR (Autonomous Soviet Socialist Republic) leaders feared that the revitalized strength of the Russian SFSR threatened to relegate their place in the Russian and Soviet hierarchy. Also, the ASSR leaders, which were propelled through corruption and clan hierarchy, feared Yeltsin's brand of populism, which could sweep away the corrupt Party networks painted by nationalist populist democrat Yeltsin as "atavistic remnants of communism".

Yeltsin presented himself as a "democratic" and "anti-communist" leader. He visited Chechnya in March 1991. In April 1991, the RSFSR Supreme Soviet proceeded to pass the Law on the Rehabilitation of Repressed Peoples, which was popular among Chechens, who had been deported en masse by Soviet authorities in 1944. During his presidential campaign, Yeltsin promoted the self-determination and used the slogan "Take as much sovereignty as you can swallow". According to Emil Pain and Arkadii Popov, Yeltsin's team "promised to maximize the autonomy of Russia's constituent republics, and was willing to ignore the anti-constitutional games played by republican authorities and nationalist movements that advocated different versions of ethnic sovereignty". In June 1991, Chechnya took part in the Russian presidential elections, and 80% of Chechens voted in favor of Yeltsin. While the National Congress did not want the election to be held in Chechnya, considering it to be sovereign from Russia, according to Dr. Tracey German, "the election issue demonstrated the extent of Zavgayev's resolve in his confrontation with the centre". He endorsed the elections and one week before it even supported Yeltsin's candidacy.

The National Congress intensified its activity in March 1991, when Dudayev retired from the Soviet Air Forces and returned to Chechnya to hold the second session of the National Congress. In May 1991, the Congress declared that the Supreme Soviet had "fulfilled its historical mission" by declaring the republic's sovereignty. It urged the Supreme Soviet to disband and announced that the Congress would assume all power in the republic up to the new elections in Chechnya.

=== 1991 Soviet Coup ===
On 19 August, a coup was carried out in Moscow, where the State Committee on the State of Emergency (GKChP), a group of Communist Party functionaries, KGB officials and Soviet generals, took over and stripped the country's president, Mikhail Gorbachev, of his power. The group accused Gorbachev and his leadership of implementing political and economic reforms which, as they argued, caused chaos in the country and threatened the collapse of the Soviet Union. On 20 August, New Union Treaty was planned to be signed, which would have effectively transformed the Soviet Union into a loose confederation. Though the treaty was intended to save the union, the hardliners feared that it would increase the power of constituent republics and encourage them to press for full independence. GKChP announced that it would take "necessary steps" to preserve the Soviet Union.

The coup caused mixed reactions in the union republics. Independence-minded republics, such as Lithuania, Latvia, Estonia etc., condemned the coup and supported its main opponent, Boris Yeltsin. Some republics supported the coup, such as Azerbaijan, Turkmenistan etc. Ukraine, Kazakhstan and others choose to hold a neutral position.

== History ==
=== Protests in Chechnya ===
The Moscow coup happened when Soviet Chechen leader Doku Zavgayev was in Moscow to sign the New Union Treaty. Almost all officials in Grozny either favored the attempted coup or avoided taking sides. Neither did Zavgayev in Moscow take a clear position. In contrast, on August 19, All-National Congress of the Chechen People issued a decree denouncing the GKChP as "a group of government criminals" and called for mass protests to oppose the coup in Chechnya. In early morning, a large demonstration began in Grozny led by Dudayev. The Chechen National Congress and the Vainakh Democratic Party led by Zelimkhan Yandarbiyev set up operation head-quarters in the former building of the gorkom (city committee of the Communist Party) to lead a resistance against GKChP. Dudaev stated that had the GKChP succeeded in taking power, it "was preparing an especially refined genocide for the Chechen people".

In the late morning or early afternoon of 19 August, Zelimkhan Yandarbiyev was arrested by the secret police and the protest meeting was forcibly dispersed by the republican militia. Later the same day Yandarbiyev and his fellow activist were released.

The National Congress issued an appeal, calling for an "indefinite general political strike". The same day the National Congress started to form "battle detachments and strike groups" to "repulse the GKChP". The armed formations of Congress established the National Guard. On 20 August, the republican militia attempted to raid the headquarters of the National Congress. The joint KGB-MVD force tried to take control of the gorkom building but failed as they were driven out by national guards loyal to the National Congress.

On August 21, Zavgayev returned to Chechnya, but could not regain control over the situation. On 22 August, Dudayev and National Congress led the mass rally in Grozny calling the Supreme Soviet to resign, accusing it of failing to take a principled position regarding the coup. On August 22, Dudayev's armed supporters clashed with the republican militia and seized the television station in Chechnya. Dudayev made an appeal on television which was followed by the mass influx of rural Chechens into capital to overthrow the Supreme Soviet. John Dunlop describes this as a "social revolution" against "detested Communist Party nomenklatura". The religious and clan leaders in the villages helped to swing the rural populace over the side of Dudayev, believing that Dudayev, a secular leader, would eventually be induced to establish an Islamic republic in Chechnya. The new entrepreneurial class, which represented the republic's "shadow economy", was also involved in the protests and financially backed Dudayev.

On 24 August, the protesters pulled down the Lenin's statue in the town center. On 25 August, the emergency session of the Supreme Soviet rejected the National Congress's ultimatum. Chechnya fell into diarchy.

=== Zavgayev's downfall ===
On 26 August, the member of the Presidium of the Supreme Soviet of the RSFSR, General Aslambek Aslakhanov, an ethnic Chechen, and Inga Grebesheva, the deputy chairwoman of the RSFSR Council of Ministers, arrived in Grozny. They warned Zavgayev not to use force to resolve the political crisis. According to professor Matthew Evangelista, demonstrations in Grozny and Zavgayev's dubious position during the Moscow coup convinced Yeltsin's circle that Zavgayev had to go. Yeltsin himself played a crucial role in the failure of the Moscow coup and emerged as a dominant leader, surpassing Gorbachev. Consequently, Yeltsin and his team wanted to jettison Zavgayev from power. According to then acting RSFSR Supreme Soviet chairman Ruslan Khasbulatov, Yeltsin called him and informed him on his plan "to replace Zavgayev with Salambek Khadzhiyev". Khasbulatov and others believed that their candidate would be able to win election against Dudayev. Also according to Khasbulatov, he convinced General Petr Deinekin, commander of the Soviet Air Forces, and others to fly to Grozny in an attempt to convince Dudayev to return to a career in the military. These attempts were not successful.

Khasbulatov, himself of Chechen descent, was assigned the task of dealing with Chechen situation by authorities in Moscow. According to Robert Seely, both Dudayev and Khasbulatov competed for the role of the most powerful Chechen: "Dudayev wanted to be the man to lead Chechnya to autonomy or independence; Khasbulatov wanted the republic as a secure power base."

Under heavy pressure from the Moscow authorities, Presidium of the Checheno-Ingush Supreme Soviet resigned, but Zavgayev refused to do so. He also failed to negotiate a settlement with Dudayev-led opposition. On 1 September, the building of the republican Council of Ministers was taken over, with the green flag of Islam being raised over it. On 1–2 September, the third session of the National Congress declared the Supreme Soviet disbanded and passed a resolution granting full power in the republic to its executive committee.

On 3 September, the Supreme Soviet and Zavgayev responded by declaring the state of emergency in Grozny. Zavgayev announced the presidential elections to be held on 29 September. On September 6, Dudayev's National Guard stormed a Zavgayev's meeting of all elected deputies of Checheno-Ingush republic at all levels, taking control of Supreme Soviet building and rendering impossible for it to continue its work. Aslambek Aslakhanov, chairman of the Committee on Questions of Legality, Law and Order, and the Struggle with Crime of the RSFSR Supreme Soviet and a leading ally of Khasbulatov, flew to Grozny. He pressued Zavgayev to resign, and the Chechen MVD did not support Zavgayev upon Aslakhanov's arrival.

On September 7, Ruslan Khasbulatov welcomed the fall of Zavgayev as a "victory of democratic forces". On 11 September, a delegation from RSFSR flew to Grozny to mediate negotiations between the nationalist opposition and the remnants of the republican government. As a result, on 15 September, the Supreme Soviet held an extraordinary session announcing its resignation and transferred power to a thirty-two member Provisional Supreme Council to hold a new election initially set for 17 November. The session was also attended by Khasbulatov. On September 17, the Provisional Council was recognized as the republic's supreme body. It consisted of the National Congress members and former deputies of the Supreme Soviet. Khusein Akhmadov, a deputy close to Dudayev, was selected to lead the Provisional Council. The same day Ruslan Khasbulatov appeared on television, congratulated the Checheno-Ingushetian republic on the "triumph of democracy" and urged all armed groups to disband. However, the Dudayev's armed group continued to patrol the streets.

== Later developments ==
=== Confrontation between Russian leadership and Dudayev ===
Dudayev considered that Russians wanted to "allow the old-guard apparatchiks" that were "agreeable to the Russians" to return "back to power". According to Dudayev, this plan "lay purposely contrary and opposed to the existence of the Chechen National Congress", which wanted to declare independence. Thus, few days later, the Provisional Council changed its initial plan and announced the election in October, which Dudayev claimed was necessary to preclude Russians from effectively interfering in the elections and to hold the polls in a "democratic manner".

On September 25, five members of the Provisional Council headed by Yurii Chernyi, who was close to Khasbulatov, condemned this development as an attempt by the National Congress to "usurp" power in the republic. Khasbulatov issued statement that if the National Congress attempted "usurpation of power", the elections would be deemed invalid. He also accused the National Congress of being "nothing more than a group of communists in nationalist guise".

On 27 September, the National Congress held a meeting and described Khasbulatov's statements as "interference by Russia in the affairs of sovereign Chechnya".

On 5 October, the thirteen members of the Provisional Supreme Council, allegedly supported by the local KGB, decided to oust that body's chairman, Khusein Akhmadov. In response, On 6 October, the National Congress dissolved the Provisional Council for "undermining and provocative activity" and declared itself "the revolutionary committee for the transitory period with full powers". The National Congress occupied the buildings of the KGB and Council of Ministers in Grozny. Only three persons were in the KGB building and it was taken over in few minutes. General Aslambek Aslakhanov claimed that there was a deal between the deputy of the chairman of Russian KGB Viktor Ivanenko and Dudayev to hand over building to him in a deal to destroy the secret documents there.

A delegation headed by the Russian vice president, General Aleksandr Rutskoi arrived in Grozny and met with the National Congress and the Provisional Supreme Council. After unsuccessful negotiations, he described Dudayev's supporters as a "gang terrorizing the population" and accused Georgian President Zviad Gamsakhurdia (Dudayev's ally) of "fomenting unrest in the [Chechen] republic". The National Congress, in response, accused Rutskoi of fomenting an attempt to remove Akhmadov from his position.

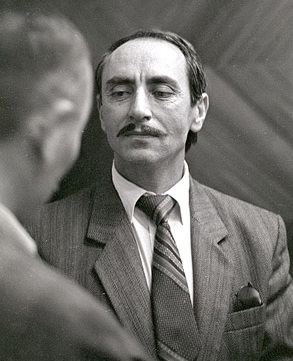
Dudayev in 1991

On October 9, the Russian Federation Supreme Soviet passed a series of resolutions denouncing "putsch" in Chechnya. One of the resolutions restored the authority of the Provisional Council and approved Bandi Bakhmadov as its chairman instead of Khusain Akhmadov. Dudayev stated that these resolutions were "virtually a declaration of war" against Chechnya and warned that Russia was preparing to "strangle the revolution". 50,000 supporters of Dudayev organized in front of the Council of Ministers building and seized it. The Chechen MVD tried to dislodge Dudayev's National Guard from major buildings in Grozny but failed.

On 19 October, in his televised address Yeltsin gave the National Congress three days to "end its rebellion", free government buildings and surrender its arms to the interior ministry. Akhmadov described the actions of Russian leadership as "the last hangover of the Russian Empire".

Despite Yeltsin's threats, the National Congress proceeded to hold an election on 27 October. Dzhokhar Dudayev won the election and was declared as Chechnya's president. Russian Federation declared this election illegal. Dudayev, in his new position as president, issued the unilateral declaration of independence on 1 November 1991.

== See also ==
- First Chechen War
- Second Chechen War

== Sources ==
- Dunlop, John (1998). Russia Confronts Chechnya: Roots of a Separatist Conflict. Cambridge University Press. ISBN 9780521636193.
- German, Tracey C. (2003). Russia's Chechen War. Taylor & Francis. ISBN 9781134432509.
- Splidsboel-Hansen, Flemming (1994). "The 1991 Chechen Revolution: The response of Moscow". Central Asian Survey. 13 (3). University of Copenhagen. doi:10.1080/02634939408400869. JSTOR 41887022.
- Giuliano, Elise (2011). Constructing Grievance: Ethnic Nationalism in Russia's Republics. Cornell University Press. ISBN 9780801461200.
- Alker, Hayward R.; Alker, Kumar; Rupesinghe, John; Gurr, Ted Robert (2001). Journeys Through Conflict: Narratives and Lessons. Rowman & Littlefield. ISBN 9780742510289.
- Seely, Robert (2021). The Russian-Chechen Conflict 1800-2000: A Deadly Embrace. Taylor & Francis. ISBN 9781136327766.
