= Battle of Dolinskoye =

Battle in the First Chechen War

Coordinates: 43°28′N 43°34′E

- Part of First Chechen War
Date	12–22 December 1994 (1 week and 3 days)
Location	Dolinskoye, Chechnya
Result	Chechen victory

Belligerents
Russia	Chechen Republic of Ichkeria

Commanders and leaders
Unknown	(Chechen Republic of Ichkeria) Vakha Arsanov (Chechen Republic of Ichkeria) Hussein Ikshanov

Casualties and losses
(Russian Military data) 21+ Russian soldiers killed (Chechen claim) 200+ killed and one 3 BM-21 'Grad' destroyed	Unknown

The Battle of Dolinskoye (Dolinskoe, Dolinsky), which took place 25 kilometers northwest of the Chechen capital of Grozny, was the first major ground engagement of the First Chechen War.

== Battle ==
The battle began on 12 December 1994, when six officers (including two colonels) and 13 enlisted men of the Russian Airborne Troops died in a surprise 9K51 Grad multiple rocket launcher attack on an advancing column of armored vehicles of the 106th Airborne Division and 56th Airborne Brigade. The Russian side immediately retaliated with a helicopter gunship and ground attack aircraft airstrikes on the Chechen positions.

== Aftermath ==
By 22 December 1994, Dolinskoye continued to hold out against Russian fire. The Russians lost 21 soldiers killed in the initial attack and admitted losing up to 200 men in the overall battle, according to the Chechen commander Hussein Ikshanov.
