= Chinkhoy =

Chechen teip

Chinkhoy (/tʃɪnhɔɪ/; Chechen: ЧӀинхой; Russian: Чинхой), also known as Chinnakhoy (Chechen: Ч1иннахой), is a Chechen teip.

== Notable members ==
- Akhmed Zakayev (1959), Chechen separatist leader and head of the government of the Chechen Republic of Ichkeria in exile
- Beslan Gantamirov (1963), Chechen politician, former mayor of Grozny (1991-1993) and one of the leaders on the Russian side of the Battle of Grozny (1999–2000)
