= 1997 Chechen general election =

- 27 January 1997
- Presidential election
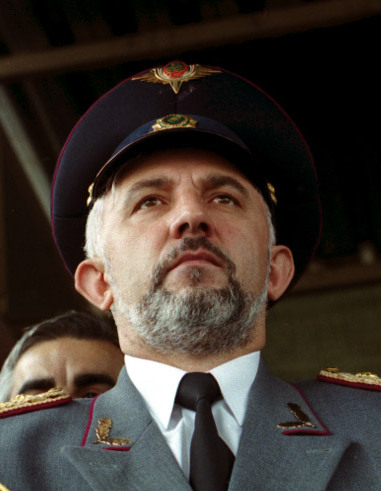

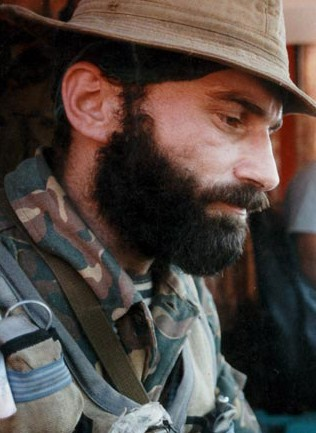

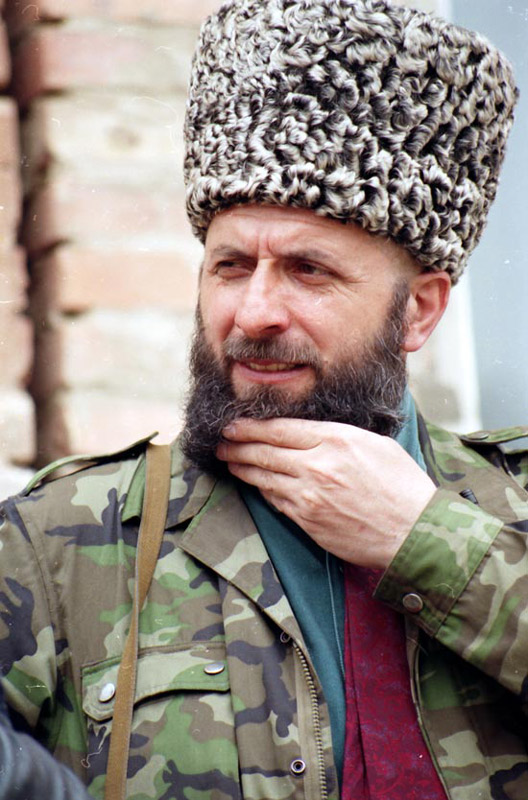
Candidate	Aslan Maskhadov	Shamil Basayev	Zelimkhan Yandarbiyev
Party	PNN	Marşanan Toba	Dzhokhar's Path
Running mate	Vakha Arsanov		Said-Khasanom Abumuslimov
Popular vote	241,950	95,841	41,183
Percentage	61.82%	24.49%	10.52%

General elections were held in the Chechen Republic of Ichkeria, on 27 January 1997 to elect the president and parliament. The result of the presidential elections was a victory for Aslan Maskhadov.

== Results ==
=== President ===
Candidate	Votes	%
Aslan Maskhadov	241,950	61.82
Shamil Basayev	95,841	24.49
Zelimkhan Yandarbiyev	41,183	10.52
Movladi Udugov	12,398	3.17
Akhmed Zakayev	12,398	3.17
Other candidates	12,398	3.17
Total	391,372	100.00
Registered voters/turnout	513,585	–
Source: L'Orient-Le Jour, Japanese Electoral Society

=== Parliament ===
Party	Seats
National Independence Party	20
Islamic Order	7
Independents	29
Vacant	7
Total	63
