= Declaration of Sovereignty of the Chechen Republic =

Independence declaration

The Decree of Sovereignty of the Chechen Republic (Russian: Указ президента Чеченской Республики о государственном суверенитете Чеченской Республики, lit. 'Decree of the President of the Chechen Republic on the state sovereignty of the Chechen Republic') was a formal declaration of independence for the Checheno-Ingush ASSR. Between 1991 and 2000 Chechnya was de facto an independent state as the Chechen Republic of Ichkeria. The declaration was issued on 1 November 1991, by the head of the All-National Congress of the Chechen People, Dzhokhar Dudayev.

== Background ==
=== Revolt ===
On 7 September 1991, the NCChP National Guard seized government buildings and the radio and television center of the Checheno-Ingush ASSR. The storming caused the death of the Grozny Soviet Communist Party chief Vitali Kutsenko, who was either thrown out of a window or fell trying to escape during a supreme soviet session that effectively dissolved the government of the Chechen-Ingush ASSR.

=== Referendum ===
Prior to the decree an independence referendum was held on October 27, 1991, which drew 72% of the populace to vote and over 90% of voters approving, meaning at least 64% of the populace approved independence. Despite claims that the election was unfair or flawed, anthropologist Arutyunov stated that it could nonetheless "be regarded as an expression of Chechen popular will". John B. Dunlop stated that some flaws had been observed, he cites Arutyunov who also stated that roughly 60-70% of the population of Chechnya supported independence at the time. Ruslan Khasbulatov claimed that the elections were un-democratic.

== Decree ==
President Dudayev issued a decree that expressed the sovereignty of the Chechen Republic. The decree reads:

DECREE OF THE PRESIDENT OF THE CHECHEN REPUBLIC

г. Grozny
November 1, 1991.
№ 1

"ON THE STATE SOVEREIGNTY OF THE CHECHEN REPUBLIC"

Guided by the Declaration on the State Sovereignty of the Republic and by the will of the citizens of the Chechen Republic as expressed by direct and universal elections, the national State sovereignty of the Chechen Republic effective from November 1, 1991 has been declared.

President

Chechen Republic D. DUDAYEV
