= Chechen naxar =

Proposed currency of the Chechen Republic of Ichkeria

Нахар (Chechen)
5 naxar obverse
5 naxar reverse

Demographics
- Date of introduction: Never circulated
- User(s): Chechen Republic of Ichkeria

Issuance
- Central bank: State Bank of the Chechen Republic of Ichkeria

The naxar (Chechen: нахар, pronounced [ˈnəxər]) was a planned currency for the Chechen Republic of Ichkeria, a self-proclaimed independent state during the 1990s Chechen separatist movement.

== History ==
Before the design and printing of the naxar, the Chechen Republic of Ichkeria did not recognize the 1993 Russian monetary reform. Instead, it continued using Soviet ruble banknotes (1961–1992 issues) and early Russian ruble notes in denominations of 5,000 and 10,000 rubles from 1992.

In 1993, Usman Kasimovich Imaev, head of the National Bank of the Chechen Republic of Ichkeria (CRI), contacted the French printing company François-Charles Oberthür with a request to print and issue currency for Chechnya. Although negotiations took place, a final agreement was never signed, and cooperation with the company was discontinued by 1994.

Later in 1994, banknotes were printed in Great Britain in denominations of 1, 3, 5, 10, 20, 50, 100, 500, and 1000 naxars, dated 1995. There are conflicting reports suggesting that the banknotes may have instead been printed in Munich, Germany, by the German security printing company Giesecke+Devrient, which allegedly produced a 100 ton of banknotes.

Despite these efforts, the currency was never introduced into circulation. According to one version, nearly all printed banknotes stored in Grozny were destroyed by Russian federal forces during military operations. However, another version claims the notes are still stored in Munich.

== Design ==
The banknotes were printed in denominations of 1, 3, 5, 10, 20, 50, 100, 500, and 1000 naxars. On both the front and back of each note, the top bears the inscription Money of the State Bank of the Chechen Republic. At the bottom, the denomination is written out in words (e.g., "one", "three", "five naxars", or "ten", "twenty", etc.).

Notes of 1, 3, and 5 naxars feature the phrase God's will be done in the upper right corner. Each banknote also carries an eight-digit serial number: a capital letter followed by seven digits in the lower right corner.

The front side of each banknote includes the signatures of Taymaz Abubakarov, Minister of Economy and Finance of the Chechen Republic (right), and Nazhmudin Uvaisayev, Chairman of the National Bank (left).

== Etymology ==
The name naxar comes from the Chechen word нахарт (nakhart), meaning "small change".
