= 1991 Chechen general election =

- 27 October 1991
- Presidential election
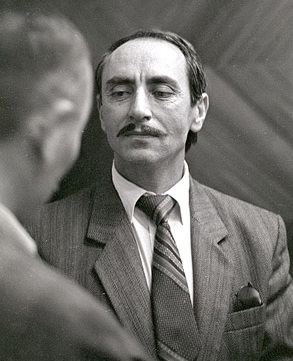

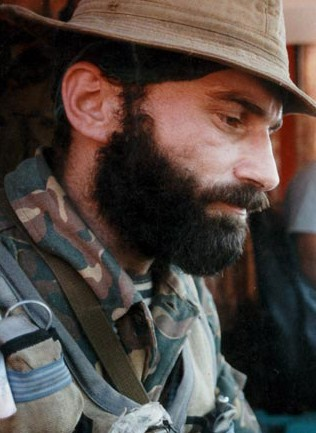

Candidate	Dzhokhar Dudayev	Shamil Basayev
Party	VDP
Popular vote	412,671
Percentage	90.07%
Candidate	Ramzan Goytemirov	Mamaka Sulayev
Elected President
Dzhokhar Dudayev
VDP

General elections were held in the Chechen Republic on 27 October 1991 to elect the president and parliament. The presidential election resulted in a victory for Dzhokhar Dudayev.

== Background ==
On 8 June 1991, a nationalist opposition Chechen National Congress, albeit lacking a legal authority, passed a resolution dissolving the Supreme Soviet of the Checheno-Ingush Autonomous Soviet Socialist Republic and proclaiming the Chechen Republic (Nokhchi-Cho). In August and September 1991, the protests organized by Chechen National Congress and its leader Dzokhar Dudayev ousted the Communist Party and its leader Doku Zavgayev from power in Checheno-Ingushetia. The leadership of the Russian Soviet Federative Socialist Republic also supported removing Doku Zavgayev from office. A subsequent conflict between the supporters of Dudayev and Russian authorities led to the Chechen National Congress proclaiming itself as a provisional government in Chechnya before the elections, which were scheduled by the Congress for October 1991. Initially, the executive committee of the CNC scheduled presidential elections for 19 October and parliamentary elections for 27 October, but both were ultimately held on the same date on 27 October 1991.

On 15 September 1991, the Assembly of Ingush Deputies passed a resolution, announcing its secession from Checheno-Ingushetia to remain within the RSFSR, thus forming the "Ingush Autonomous Republic". A referendum held in Ingushetia on 30 November to 1 December confirmed this decision, and it was finalized on 4 June 1992 with the Russian law "On the Creation of the Ingush Republic in the Russian Federation". The Ingush feared that joining the independent Chechnya would have meant compromising territorial claims on Prigorodny District, which is a subject of a dispute between the Ingush and Ossetians. The Ingush lost the land following their deportation to Central Asia in 1944, and then recent Russian law On the Rehabilitation of Repressed Peoples, passed in April 1991, gave them hopes of returning the territory. Thus, the Ingush did not take part in Chechen election.

== Conduct ==
Latvia, Lithuania, Estonia and Georgia sent their observers, and the representatives of non-governmental organizations from several countries also attended the elections. They declared the elections to be free and democratic. According to John B. Dunlop, although some flaws had been observed, the election still could be regarded as reflecting the will of Chechen people. Ruslan Khasbulatov claimed that the elections were undemocratic.

== Results ==
=== President ===
Candidate	Party	Votes	%
Dzhokhar Dudayev	Vainakh Democratic Party	412,671	90.07
Shamil Basayev		45,473	9.93
Ramzan Goytemirov		45,473	9.93
Mamaka Sulayev		45,473	9.93
Total		458,144	100.00
Total votes		458,144	–
Registered voters/turnout		638,608	71.74
Source: Dzidzoev

== Reactions ==
- (Russian Soviet Federative Socialist Republic) / Russia – On 2 November, the Fifth Congress of RSFSR Deputies under the chairmanship of Ruslan Khasbulatov declared the elections to be unlawful and unconstitutional.
- Georgia – Georgian president Zviad Gamsakhurdia congratulated Dzokhar Dudayev on victory and attended his inauguration.

== Aftermath ==
On 1 November, Dzokhar Dudayev issued a decree declaring the independence of the Chechen Republic.

=== Inauguration ===
Dudayev's inauguration was scheduled for 9 November. With an apparent goal of prevent Dudayev's inauguration, Russian president Boris Yeltsin declared the state of emergency in Chechnya on 8 November and ordered the introduction of troops to restore the order, while banning rallies and ordering the confiscation of firearms. 532 Russian Interior Ministry troops arrived to Khankala military airport in Chechnya, but they were isolated by the Chechen National Guard, which blockaded the roads to a military airfield. The Russian troops were bussed to the Russian border by Chechen militiamen. Amidst the news of the blockade of Russian troops in Khankala, other Russian troops landed in Vladikavkaz, North Ossetia.

Russia issued a warrant for the arrest of Dudayev. Inauguration took place and Dudayev took an oath on the Koran. Dudayev responded by declaring the martial law in Chechnya and announcing a general mobilization. The Dudayev's troops began to build street barricades out of buses and trucks to prevent Russian troops from entering Grozny. Chechen activists hijacked a Tupolov-154 Aeroflot airliner in Mineralnye Vody with a goal of bringing international attention to the Chechen situation. Police patrols were issued automatic rifles and security was strengthened around Russian Parliament in Moscow in face of threats against Yeltsin's life coming from Grozny. The decision to send the troops was not supported by the Soviet leaders, with the Soviet interior minister Viktor Barannikov saying that he and Soviet president Mikhail Gorbachev wanted to see the conflict resolved by "political means". On 11 November, Russian Supreme Soviet voted 177 to 4 to abolish the state of emergency.
