= Politics of Chechnya =

The Republic of Chechnya is a constituent republic and federal subject of the Russian Federation. It is located in the Caucasus region in southwest Russia. It is the political successor of the Checheno-Ingush Autonomous Soviet Socialist Republic. From a centralized form of government during the existence of the Soviet Union, the republic's political system went upheavals during the 1990s with the establishment of the Chechen Republic of Ichkeria, leading to the First Chechen War and the Second Chechen War which left the republic in total devastation. In 2000, following Russia's renewed rule, a local, republican form of government was established in the republic under the control of the Russian federal government.

== Political background ==
In November 1990, the first Chechen National Congress (NCChP) was convened. It was an opposition movement headed by Major-General Dzhokhar Dudayev. In March 1991, the Supreme Soviet refused to take part in the All-Russian referendum on the introduction of the position of the President of the Russian Federation. That was the beginning of Chechnya's refusal to be involved with any All-Russia voting, which lasted for many years.

The Soviet coup d'état attempt on 19 August 1991 became the spark for the so-called Chechen Revolution. On 21 August the NCChP called for the overthrow of the Supreme Soviet of the Chechen-Ingush Republic. On September 11, 1991 Gennady Burbulis and Mikhail Poltoranin were dispatched from Moscow by the federal authorities to try restore order. On September 14, Ruslan Khasbulatov, a Chechen elected in 1990 to the Supreme Soviet of Russia from Grozny and its acting chairman after June 1991, arrived in Grozny. On September 15, at a special session of the Chechen-Ingush Supreme Soviet, he persuaded the deputies to remove Zavgayev and to disband, in anticipation of new parliamentary elections, which were set for November 17. The political struggle between the radical nationalist forces, grouped around Dudayev and pushing for independence, and the conservative nomenklatura, trying to preserve the status quo, continued.

In September 1991, NCChP squads seized the local KGB headquarters, and took over the building of the Supreme Soviet. The NCChP declared itself the only legitimate authority in the region. Checheno-Ingush First Secretary Doku Zavgayev, who had supported the 1991 Coup (GKChP), was overthrown on September 6 by the Dudayev-led National Congress, and on October 27 presidential and parliamentary elections were held in Chechnya.

In October 1991, Dudayev was elected president of the Chechen-Ingush Republic, with 85% of the vote. Dudayev, in his new position as president, issued a unilateral declaration of independence on 2 November 1991.

Increasing instability in the Chechen Republic in 1992-1993 was related primarily to the competition between several major teips (clans) which started to struggle for control over oil, drugs-trafficking and arms smuggling. In 1993, several presidential decrees and government orders were issued in Moscow for tightening control on the Chechnya borders but with little practical effect, since Dagestan was not particularly interested in implementing those while the border between Chechnya and Ingushetia was not even demarcated after the split.

=== Government of Akhmad Kadyrov ===
After the conclusion of the Second Chechen War, newly elected Russian President Vladimir Putin established direct rule of Chechnya in May 2000. The following month, Putin appointed Akhmad Kadyrov interim head of the government.

=== Government of Ramzan Kadyrov ===
Since December 2005, the pro-Moscow militia leader Ramzan Kadyrov, the son of Akhmad Kadyrov, has ruled Chechnya as Chechnya's prime minister and the republic's de facto ruler and subsequently under the new title as Head of the Chechnya Republic. Kadyrov, whose irregular forces are accused of carrying out many of the abductions and atrocities; has become Chechnya's most powerful leader since the 2004 assassination of his father.

The 29-year-old was elevated to full-time premier in March 2006, in charge of an administration that is a collection of his allies and teip (clan) members. In the same month, the Ramzan Kadyrov government officially took control of Chechnya's oil industry and rejected a federal proposition of the republican budget, demanding much more money to be sent from Moscow; for years, Chechnya was known as a Russia's "financial black hole" where the funds are widely embezzled and tend to vanish without trace. On March 30, 2006, Interfax reported Chechen People's Assembly Chairman Dukvakha Abdurakhmanov has spoken in favour of a complete withdrawal of all Russian federal forces except the border guards.

In April 2006 Kadyrov himself criticized remaining units of federal police, namely Operational/Search Bureau (ORB-2), and called for their immediate withdrawal from the republic. He also called for refugee camps scattered about Chechnya to be closed down, saying they were populated by "international spies" intent on destabilizing the region. Later this month, Abdurakhmanov said Chechnya should be merged with Ingushetia and Dagestan; Ingush and Dagestani leaders disagreed. Paradoxically, a merger would reflect the will of Chechen separatists of establishing an Islamic state across the North Caucasus.

On April 29, 2006, after a deadly clash between Kadyrov's and Alkhanov's men in Grozny, Ramzan Kadyrov officially disbanded his security service. Kadyrovites, an irregular army of thousands of former rebels, have been pivotal in supporting Kadyrov. Rights activists working in Chechnya say the Kadyrovites abused their powers to crush any rivals to Kadyrov; they have repeatedly accused Kadyrov's personal guard of using kidnapping, murder and torture to cement his rule. On May 2, 2006, representatives of European Committee for the Prevention of Torture (CPT), the Council of Europe's anti-torture watchdog, said they were prevented from entering the fortress of Ramzan Kadyrov, the alleged site of prisoner abuse; rights activists claim that prisoners and kidnap victims are tortured in secret jails in Chechen villages, including Tsentoroi, the ancestral home of the Kadyrov clan.

Kadyrov's deputy is Idris Gaibov.

== Constitution ==
A constitution was adopted in March 1992. The constitution was semi-presidential. It is unclear how long the constitution was even nominally operational. In April 1992 President Dudayev began to rule by decree and in June 1993 parliament was dissolved.

Following the First Chechen War and the Second Chechen War, the constitution was not in force due to the political and social catastrophic situation in the Republic.

On March 23, 2003, a new Chechen constitution was passed in a referendum. The 2003 Constitution granted the Chechen Republic a significant degree of autonomy, but still tied it firmly to the Russian Federation and Moscow's rule. The new constitution went into force on April 2, 2003. Under the current 2003 constitution, Chechnya is meant to operate under a presidential system. Proposals for a parliamentary system was rejected as it was seen to be as "inconsistent with the overall [Russian] constitutional field." but was still supported by Beslan Gantamirov, former Mayor of Grozny.

The referendum was strongly supported by the Russian government but met a harsh critical response from Chechen separatists. Many citizens chose to boycott the ballot. The international opinion was mixed, as enthusiasm for the prospect of peace and stability in the region was tempered by concerns about the conduct of the referendum and fears of a violent backlash. Chief among the concerns are the 40,000 Russian soldiers that were included in the eligible voters' list (out of approximately 540,000).

Following the constitution's approval, President Putin said "The results have surpassed even our most optimistic expectations. This shows that the people of Chechnya have made their choice in favor of peace, in favor of positive development together with Russia."

No independent international organization (neither the Organization for Security and Co-operation in Europe (OSCE) nor the United Nations) officially observed the voting, but observers from Organisation of the Islamic Conference, League of Arab States, CIS, Muslim countries (Malaysia, Indonesia, Yemen, Oman et al.) have recognized a referendum "free and democratic." The OSCE, the United States State Department, and the United Kingdom's Foreign Office all questioned the wisdom of holding the referendum while the region was still unsettled.

== Elections ==
=== 2003 presidential elections ===
On October 5, 2003, presidential elections were held in Chechnya under the auspices of the March constitution. As with the constitutional referendum, the OSCE and other international organizations did not send observers to monitor proceedings. The Kremlin-supported candidate Akhmat Kadyrov earned a commanding majority, taking about 80 percent of the vote. Critics of the 2003 election argue that separatist Chechens were barred from running, and that Kadyrov used his private militia to actively discourage political opponents.

=== 2004 presidential elections ===
On August 29, 2004 a new Presidential election took place. At night on August 21, 2004, a week before the appointed elections of the President of the Chechen Republic, large-scale military operation was carried out by Chechen fighters in the capital city of Grozny, targeting polling stations and other government targets. According to the Chechen electoral commission, the Kremlin-backed Militsiya General Alu Alkhanov was reported to have won the elections with almost 74%, with over 85% of the people having voted according to Chechen elections commissions head Abdul-Kerim Arsakhanov. Many observers, such as the U.S. Department of State, International Helsinki Federation for Human Rights, as well as the opposition, question the election, citing, in part, the disqualification of the major rival Malik Saidullayev on a technicality. Polling conditions were also questioned, but no formal complaints have been made. The election was internationally monitored by the Commonwealth of Independent States and Arab League; western monitors didn't participate in monitoring the election in protest at previous irregularities, despite being invited.

=== 2005 parliamentary elections ===
The latest Chechen elections were held in November 2005. The independent observers said that there were plenty of Russian troops and more journalists than voters at polling stations. Lord Judd, a former Council of Europe special reporter on Chechnya, regarded the elections as flawed; "I simply do not believe we will have stability, peace and a viable future for the Chechen people until we have a real political process," he said. The candidates all belonged to Moscow-based parties and were loyal to Chechnya's Prime Minister Ramzan Kadyrov.

== Islamization ==
In 2006, Kadyrov started to create laws that he says are more suitable to Chechnya's Islamic heritage—banning alcohol and gambling on January 20, and enforcing women's use of headscarves—in defiance of Russia's secular constitution. He also publicly spoke in favor of polygamy on January 13, and declared that lessons in the Quran and Sharia should be obligatory at Chechen schools. On February 11, Ramzan criticized the republican media for broadcasting immoral programs and officially introduced censorship in Chechnya. Because of the cartoon scandal that shook the whole Muslim world, Kadyrov issued a brief ban on the Danish Refugee Council, the most active humanitarian organization in Caucasus.

On June 1, 2006, Moscow-backed Chechen President Alu Alkhanov said he would prefer his republic be governed by Sharia law and suggested adapting the Islamic code, speaking in Paris after inconclusive talks with the Council of Europe. "If Chechnya were run by Sharia law, it would not look as it does today." Alkhanov also dismissed reports of conflicts with Kadyrov, who was widely believed to want to take over the presidency when he turned 30 in October that year and now can legally assume the job.
