= Akhmed Zakayev =

Prime Minister of Ichkeria

- Заки Ахьмад
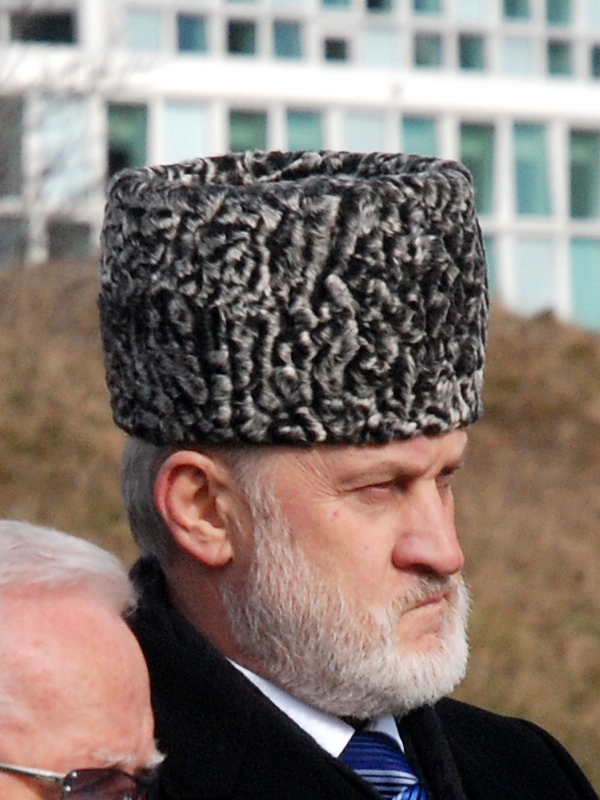
- Zakayev in 2018

Prime Minister of the Chechen Republic of Ichkeria's government-in-exile
- Incumbent
- Assumed office 25 November 2007
- Preceded by: Dokka Umarov

Deputy Prime Minister of the Chechen Republic of Ichkeria
- In office 1997 – 6 February 2006

Foreign Minister of the Chechen Republic of Ichkeria
- In office 1997 – 29 July 1999
- President: Aslan Maskhadov

Culture Minister of the Chechen Republic of Ichkeria
- In office 1994 – 20 November 2007
- President: Dzhokhar Dudayev

Personal details
- Born: Akhmed Khalidovich Zakayev; 26 April 1959 (age 67) Kirovskiy, Kazakh SSR, Soviet Union (now Almaty Region, Kazakhstan)
- Citizenship: Ichkerian (1991–2000)
- Spouse: Rosa Zakayeva
- Education: Voronezh State Academy of Arts

Military service
- Allegiance: Chechen Republic of Ichkeria
- Rank: Brigadier general
- Battles/wars: Russo-Chechen wars; First Chechen War; Second Chechen War; Russo-Ukrainian War; Russian invasion of Ukraine

Akhmed Halidovich Zakayev (Chechen: Заки Хьалид кӏант Ахьмад, romanized: Zaki Ẋalid Khant Aẋmad; Russian: Ахмед Халидович Закаев, romanized: Akhmed Khalidovich Zakayev; born 26 April 1959) is a Chechen statesman, political and military figure of the unrecognised Chechen Republic of Ichkeria (ChRI). Having previously been a Deputy Prime Minister, he now serves as Prime Minister of the ChRI government-in-exile. He was also the Foreign Minister of the Ichkerian government, appointed by Aslan Maskhadov shortly after his 1997 election, and again in 2006 by Abdul Halim Sadulayev. An active participant in the Russo-Chechen wars, Zakayev took part in the battles for Grozny and the defense of Goyskoye, along with other military operations, as well as in high-level negotiations with the Russian side.

In 2002, Russia accused him, by then in exile, of having been involved in a series of crimes including involvement in acts of terrorism. In 2003, judge Timothy Workman of Bow Street Magistrates' Court in central London rejected the extradition request due to lack of evidence and declared the accusations to be politically motivated, also saying that there was substantial risk of Zakayev being tortured if he was returned to Moscow.

Since the full-scale Russian invasion of Ukraine in 2022, Zakayev has announced formation of the Separate Special Purpose Battalion of the Chechen Armed Forces, functioning as a Chechen volunteer battalion fighting with the Armed Forces of Ukraine.

== Biography ==
=== Early life ===
Akhmed Zakayev was born in the settlement of Kirovskiy, Kirovskiy Raion (today called Balpyk Bi, Koksu District), in the Kazakh SSR, Soviet Union, which is now in Almaty Region, in Kazakhstan; his family was deported by Stalin's regime along with the rest of the Chechens in 1944. Akhmed is from the teip Chinkhoy. He graduated from acting and choreography schools in Voronezh and Moscow and worked as an actor at a theatre in the Chechen capital Grozny, specializing in Shakespearean roles. From 1991, he was the chairman of the Chechen Union of the Theatrical Actors. In 1994, Zakayev became a Minister of Culture in the Chechen separatist government of Dzhokhar Dudayev.

=== Chechen wars and the interwar period ===
After Russian forces entered Chechnya, starting the First Chechen War, Zakayev left his job and took up arms. Serving at first as a minor commander in the unit of Ruslan Gelayev, he took part in the 1995 battle of Grozny and then led the defence of the village of Goyskoye. After this the armed group under his command operated in the south-west part of Chechnya with its headquarters in the town of Urus-Martan. He was eventually promoted to the rank of brigadier general and appointed commander of the Urus-Martan Front. In February 1996, Zakayev became commander of the entire Western Group of Defense of Ichkeria. In August 1996, his forces took part in the decisive raid on Grozny, where he personally led the attack on the city's central railway station. Zakayev's war service paved his way to Chechen high politics. He became the acting president Zelimkhan Yandarbiyev's advisor for the security matters and the secretary of the Chechen Security Council and represented Chechnya at the peace talks in Khasav-Yurt, which brought a peaceful end to the first armed conflict between Moscow and Grozny.

After the war, Zakayev became Chechen Deputy Prime Minister (in charge of education and culture) and a special envoy of elected President of Ichkeria Aslan Maskhadov for relations with Moscow, taking part in the delegation that signed the official Chechen-Russian peace treaty at the Kremlin in 1997. During the interwar period, he opposed the rise of radical Islam in Chechnya and co-authored a book entitled Wahhabism – the Kremlin's remedy against national liberation movements, alleging an association between Islamist extremism and Soviet global "pro-terrorist" policy and support for dictatorships in the Muslim world. During the early phases of the Second Chechen War in 1999–2000, Zakayev commanded Maskhadov's presidential guard; he was also involved in negotiations with Russian representatives before and during the resumed hostilities. In 2000, having been wounded in a car accident during the new siege of Grozny, he left Chechnya for treatment. After this he stayed abroad and became President Maskhadov's most prominent representative in Western Europe, while Ilyas Akhmadov was the Chechen emissary to the United States.

=== In exile ===
Since January 2002, Zakayev and his immediate family have been residing permanently in the United Kingdom. On 18 November 2001, Zakayev, officially internationally wanted by Russia, flew from Turkey to the Sheremetyevo International Airport near Moscow to meet the Kremlin's envoy, General Viktor Kazantsev for the high-level talks since the start of the war. These negotiations were fruitless because Kazantsev demanded a complete capitulation of the Chechen side, with the only acceptable topic for the Russian side being the disarmament of Chechen separatists and their re-integration into civilian life. On 18 July 2002, Zakayev also met with the former secretary of Security Council of Russia Ivan Rybkin in Zürich, Switzerland.

In October 2002, Zakayev organized the World Chechen Congress in Copenhagen, Denmark (which was attended among others by the former first speaker of the State Duma, Ruslan Khasbulatov). During the congress, Zakayev was accused by Russia of involvement in planning of the Moscow theater hostage crisis. He was detained there on 30 October 2002, under an Interpol warrant filed by Russia, which named him a suspect in the theater siege. Zakayev denied involvement in the theater capture. He was held in Denmark for five weeks and then released due to lack of evidence, as Russia's formal extradition request did not include any evidence linking him to the siege.

On 7 December 2002, Zakayev returned to the UK but the British authorities arrested him briefly at London Heathrow Airport; he was released on 50,000 GBP bail, which was paid by British actress Vanessa Redgrave, his friend who had travelled with him from Denmark. He was accused by Russian authorities of 13 criminal acts. Zakayev welcomed the British deportation hearings as an opportunity to put his case before an international public. All accusations were proven to be false. One accusation, cutting fingers of a suspected FSB informer Ivan Solovyov, was based on a written testimony by Zakayev's former bodyguard, Duk-Vakha Dushuyev, provided by Russian authorities; however, it appeared that Solovyev had lost his fingers much earlier to frostbite. Dushuyev himself has escaped from Russia and then in his statement claimed that he was tortured at a Russian army base with electric shocks to extort the false testimony to be used against Zakayev. In another accusation, Father Sergei, one of two Russian Orthodox Church priests allegedly murdered by Zakayev, turned out to be in fact still alive. The witness Reverend Filipp, allegedly kidnapped by Zakayev in 1996, also refuted his supposed testimony and even denounced Russian authorities for "implicating the Church in politics". Leading Russian human rights activist Sergei Kovalev told the court Zakayev would be at risk of death in Russian captivity (Kovalev spoke about two high-profile Chechen prisoners, field commanders Salman Raduyev and Turpal-Ali Atgeriyev, who died soon after being jailed in Russia, and of another, parliamentary speaker Ruslan Alikhadzhiyev, who has "disappeared" without trace after his arrest in 2000). According to Alexander Goldfarb, one of the defence's most important arguments was the 2001 meeting between Zakayev and General Kazantsev, since this meeting took place when the Chechen envoy had already been put by Russia on the international wanted list. At the time of the meeting Kremlin's spokesman on Chechnya Sergei Yastrzhembsky said on television that Russian government had no grievances against Zakayev. Therefore, on 13 November 2003, Judge Timothy Workman rejected the Russian request, deciding that it was politically motivated and that Zakayev would be at risk of torture in the case of "unjust and oppressive" extradition. The judge also said the crimes which involved Zakayev allegedly using armed force against combatants were not extraditable because they took place in the situation of internal armed conflict. Russian authorities in turn responded by accusing the court of double standards. On 29 November 2003, it was announced that Zakayev had been granted political asylum in the UK.

After receiving political asylum in Great Britain in 2003, Zakayev made London his permanent residence, and he visited several countries (including France, Germany and Poland) without being arrested. During the September 2004 Beslan school hostage crisis, Zakayev consented to the request of the civilian negotiators and authorities of North Ossetia–Alania to fly to Russia to negotiate with the hostage takers. However, the siege ended in bloody confusion just a few hours before this could happen. As an envoy of Maskhadov, he also met in London with the representatives of the Union of the Committees of Soldiers' Mothers of Russia in February 2005, where they agreed on a peace proposal centred around a gradual cessation of violence by rebels corresponding with the three-week ceasefire unilaterally declared by Maskhadov (who once again called for President of Russia Vladimir Putin to negotiate). These efforts were ignored by the Russian government and Maskhadov himself was soon killed in Chechnya.

On 31 October 2007, Zakayev officially distanced himself from the newly resigned Chechen separatist leader Doku Umarov and the Chechen Islamist ideologist Movladi Udugov, who together had declared the creation of Caucasus Emirate in the place of abolished ChRI. In response, Zakayev called for the remnants of the separatist parliament to form the new government and salvage legitimacy. Soon after, on 20 November 2007, Zakayev submitted his resignation from the post of foreign minister, but said this should not be viewed as a departure from "the fight for our independence, our freedom, and for the recognition of our state". He subsequently assumed the position of prime minister of the exile government. In September 2008, Ramzan Kadyrov said he was now trying to persuade Chechens refugees and exiles to return, including Akhmed Zakayev, whom Kadyrov described as "a valuable artist who would be welcome to return to help revive Chechnya's cultural heritage." Zakayev and Alla Dudayeva, the widow of the first Chechen President Dzhokhar Dudayev, accused Udugov of being a paid agent provocateur for the Russia's FSB.

In London, Zakayev became friends with the Russian dissident and former FSB officer Alexander Litvinenko, later murdered by radioactive poisoning in November 2006; Zakayev accused the Russian President Putin of ordering the death of Litvinenko. In 2007, British police warned Zakayev that there was an increased threat to his personal security shortly before the alleged attempt to kill Berezovsky by the FSB-connected Chechen gangster Movladi Atlangeriyev (or "Mr A"). According to the KGB defector Oleg Gordievsky in 2008, Zakayev was placed #2 on the FSB assassination list, between Berezovsky and Litvinenko. In January 2008, Zakayev's name showed up on the purported hit list of Ramzan Kadyrov's enemies abroad to be killed, which was published on the Internet following the murder of the Chechen dissident Umar Israilov (a former bodyguard of Kadyrov who was shot dead after receiving asylum in Austria). Zakayev was arrested by the Polish police during his visit to Poland on 17 September 2010. He was released the same day.

In 2021, Zakayev expressed his condolences to the friends and relatives of the killed head of "Islamic State – Caucasus Province", Aslan Byutukayev, calling him and his followers "best of the best representatives of our people", a statement that met criticism from Ramzan Kadyrov.

In September 2021, Zakayev released a statement on behalf of the Chechen government-in-exile regarding the Fall of Kabul and the conquest of Afghanistan by the Taliban. According to researcher Aslan Doukaev, the statement was "cautious", as it voiced concerns over "possible violations of fundamental human rights" and urged the Taliban to not abuse their power, pointing out that Muhammad had also behaved mercifully upon conquering Mecca. Doukaev contrasted Zakayev's wording with much more enthusiastic comments made by Islamist Chechen separatists.

=== Increased activism amid the Russian invasion of Ukraine ===
In 2022, Russia launched a full invasion of Ukraine. At this point, several anti-Kadyrov Chechen militant groups like the Dzhokhar Dudayev Battalion and the Sheikh Mansur Battalion were already fighting for Ukraine. In May 2022, Zakayev travelled to Kyiv and met with Ukrainian officials for "confidential" talks. Later, the creation of the "Separate Special Purpose Battalion of the Chechen Republic's Armed Forces" was announced by Zakayev; this unit officially styled itself as the continuation of the Armed Forces of the Chechen Republic of Ichkeria. A fourth separatist unit, called "Khamzat Gelayev Joint Task Detachment" was also founded. As the Russo-Ukrainian War continued to escalate, the pro-Ukrainian Chechen separatists increasingly framed the war as a chance to restore the Chechen Republic of Ichkeria. On 18 October 2022, Ukraine's parliament recognized the Chechen Republic of Ichkeria as "temporarily occupied" state. Zakayev had lobbied in support of this resolution.

In November 2023, the "Congress of the Peoples of the North Caucasus" (a political alliance of various northern Caucasus separatist groups) appointed Zakayev the head of its Defense Commission alongside Akhmad Akhmedov, Sheikh Mansur Battalion deputy commander. The Congress aims at coordinating the different separatist exiles to unite their efforts against Russia.

== Invitations to return to Chechnya ==
On 11 February 2009, Ramzan Kadyrov said he personally invited Zakayev to return to Chechnya if he does not want to be "used by special services and other forces against Russia". At the same time, Russia's ambassador in London, said Britain had turned into a "sanctuary" for Russia's fugitives, including Zakayev, still-wanted on terrorism charges. In an interview for Radio Free Europe/Radio Liberty, Zakayev claimed to rebuff the Chechen president's reported offer and said that Kadyrov was only following the Kremlin's orders; he also reinstates this stance two days later in the interview for the BBC Russian Service. Kadyrov has said that "He [Zakayev] is the only man on the part of Ichkeria who I would like to bring back home. I do not know what the competent bodies think, but I believe he did not commit serious crimes."

According to the Kavkaz Center, Zakayev, who may be granted amnesty, stated his readiness to return and "contribute to a long-term peace in the region" in an interview for Ekho Moskvy on the same day. Kavkaz Center – which supported Umarov – has called Zakayev "the head of a telephone government", referring to the fact that Zakayev has little influence on the insurgents on the ground.

On 23 August 2009, in a controversial move, he was reportedly dismissed as prime minister by the Chairman of the Chechen Republic of Ichkeria parliament in exile, as he "transgressed his mandate and recognized the legitimacy of the Kremlin’s puppet regime", and shortly afterwards, he was sentenced to death by Sharia Court of the Caucasus Emirate, because he "professes democratic religion, propagates secularism, and prefers the laws established by men to the Shari'a law of Almighty and Great Allah."

== Books ==
- Subjugate or exterminate! : a memoir of Russia's wars against Chechnya, Academica Press, 2018, 511 p.
- Russia, Chechnya, and the West, 2000–2006 : the emboldening of Putin, Academica Press, 2022, 512 p.

== See also ==
- Chechenpress
- Lopota incident
