= Chechenpress =

News agency of Chechen separatists

State News Agency Chechenpress (SNA Chechenpress) is the news agency of the Chechen separatists who proclaim themselves to be the representatives of the Chechen Republic of Ichkeria. It used to be the official press agency of Chechnya.

As of 2008, SNA Chechenpress, linked with London-based Akhmed Zakayev, is the Chechen nationalist website rival to the Islamist Kavkaz Center website run by Movladi Udugov. In November 2007 the editors of Chechenpress declared it works since then directly under the ChRI Parliament.
