= Vainakh Democratic Party =

Vainakh Democratic Party Вайнехан Демократан Цхьанкхетаралла
- Chairman and Founder: Zelimkhan Yandarbiev
- Founded: 5 May 1990
- Dissolved: 1993
- Newspaper: Bart
- Ideology: Anti-communism; Chechen independence Ethnic nationalism
- Political position: Big tent

Vainakh Democratic Party (Chechen: Вайнехан Демократан Цхьанкхетаралла, romanized: Vaynexan Demokratan Cẋanqetaralla) was a political party of Chechen Republic of Ichkeria. It was founded on 5 May 1990 by Zelimkhan Yandarbiev. The goal of the party was to create a “Chechen independent democratic state”.

== Description of the party ==
The name of the party comes from Vainakh, the common exo-ethnonym of the Chechens and the Ingush people.

The party is anti-communist and wishes to establish an Chechen-Ingush republic which would be independent of the Soviet Union.

Among the most well-known members of the party are its leader, Zelimkhan Yandarbiyev, and the public figure Said-Khasanom Abumuslimov.
