= Zelimkhan Yandarbiyev =

Chechen politician (1952–2004)

- Яндарбиев Зелимхан
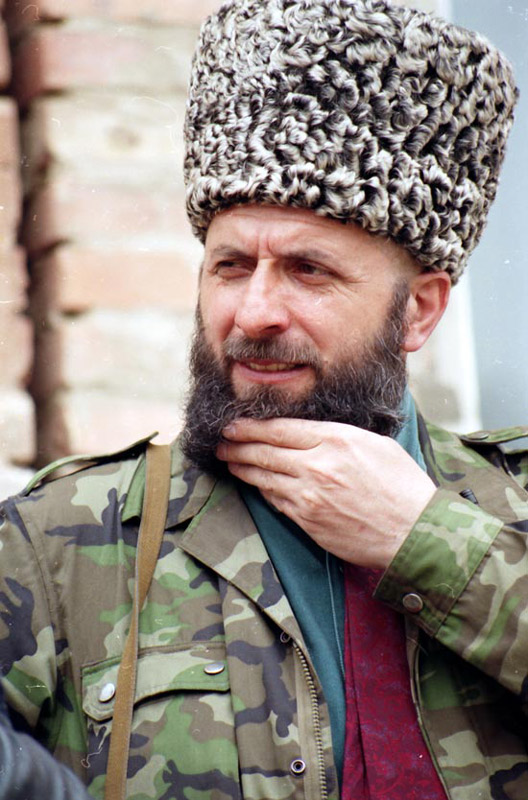
- Yandarbiyev in 2000

2nd President of the Chechen Republic of Ichkeria
- Acting
- In office 21 April 1996 – 12 February 1997
- Vice President: Said-Khasanom Abumuslimov
- Preceded by: Dzhokhar Dudayev
- Succeeded by: Aslan Maskhadov

Prime Minister of Ichkeria
- In office 21 April 1996 – 16 October 1996
- Preceded by: Dzhokhar Dudayev
- Succeeded by: Aslan Maskhadov

Vice President of Ichkeria
- In office 17 April 1993 – 21 April 1996
- President: Dzhokhar Dudayev
- Succeeded by: Said-Khasanom Abumuslimov

Personal details
- Born: 12 September 1952 Vydrika, Kazakh SSR, Soviet Union (now Kazakhstan)
- Died: 13 February 2004 (aged 51) Doha, Qatar
- Cause of death: Assassination
- Party: VDP, NCChP
- Spouse: Malika Yandarbiyeva
- Profession: Writer

Military service
- Allegiance: Chechen Republic of Ichkeria
- Battles/wars: First Chechen War; Second Chechen War

Zelimkhan Abdulmuslimovich Yandarbiyev (Chechen: Яндарбиев Абдулмуслиман-кIант Зелимхан, romanized: Yandarbiev Abdulmusliman-khant Zelimxan; Russian: Зелимхан Абдулмуслимович Яндарбиев, also spelled Yandarbin; 12 September 1952 – 13 February 2004) was a Chechen writer and politician who was the second president of the Chechen Republic of Ichkeria between 1996 and 1997. In 2004, Yandarbiyev was assassinated while he was on a mission to obtain recognition of the Chechen Republic by Qatar.

== Life ==
Yandarbiyev was originally a literary scholar, poet, and children's literature writer, having studied at the Maxim Gorky Literature Institute in Moscow and co-founding a clandestine literature club which would eventually be banned by the Soviet authorities.

Years later, Yandarbiyev became a leader in the Chechen nationalist movement as the Soviet Union began to collapse. In July 1989, he founded the Bart (Unity) Party, a democratic party that promoted the unity of Caucasian ethnic groups against Russian imperialism and terrorism. In May 1990, he founded and led the Vainakh Democratic Party (VDP), the first Chechen political party, which was committed to an independent Chechnya. The VDP initially represented both Chechen and Ingush until their split after Chechnya's declaration of independence from the Russian Soviet Federative Socialist Republic.

In November 1990, he became the deputy chairman of the newly formed All-National Congress of the Chechen People (NCChP), which was led by Dzhokhar Dudayev and which ousted the Soviet-era leadership. With Dudayev, he signed an agreement with Ingush leaders splitting the joint Chechen-Ingush republic in two. In the first Chechen parliament, from 1991 to 1993, Yandarbiyev headed the media committee. In April 1993 he was appointed as the Vice President of Ichkeria by Dudayev.

In April 1996, following the assassination of his predecessor Dzhokhar Dudayev, he became the Acting President of Ichkeria. In late May 1996, Yandarbiyev headed a Chechen delegation that met President of Russia Boris Yeltsin and Prime Minister of Russia Viktor Chernomyrdin for peace talks at the Kremlin that resulted in the signature of a ceasefire agreement on 27 May 1996.

In 1997, during the signing of the Russian-Chechen Peace Treaty in Moscow, Yandarbiyev famously forced Russian President Yeltsin to change seats at a negotiating table so he would be received like a head of sovereign state. Yandarbiyev stood in the presidential election held in Chechnya in February 1997, but was defeated by the Chechen separatist top military leader, General Aslan Maskhadov, getting 10 per cent of the votes and landing third behind Maskhadov and Shamil Basayev. Together with Maskhadov, Yandarbiyev took part in signing of the "lasting" peace treaty in Moscow.

The two Chechen leaders fell out badly the following year, when Yandarbiyev was accused of being behind an assassination attempt against Maskhadov. In September 1998, Maskhadov publicly denounced Yandarbiyev, accusing him of importing the Islamic extremist philosophy of "Wahhabism" and of being responsible for "anti-state activities" including anti-government speeches and public meetings, as well as the organisation of illegal armed groups. Yandarbiyev subsequently joined forces with the hard-line Islamist opposition to Maskhadov's rule.

In August–September 1999, Yandarbiyev was assumed as a key figure behind the invasion by the Islamic International Brigade-led coalition of Islamist guerrillas on the neighboring Russian Republic of Dagestan. At the beginning of the Second Chechen War, Yandarbiyev traveled abroad to Afghanistan, Pakistan and the United Arab Emirates and eventually settled in Qatar in 1999, where he sought to obtain Muslim support for the Chechen cause

After being accused of involvement in the October 2002 Moscow theater hostage crisis, Yandarbiyev was placed on Interpol's most wanted list and Russia made the first of several requests for extradition in February 2003, citing Yandarbiyev as a major international terrorist and financier of the al-Qaeda-backed Chechen resistance. In June 2003, his name was consequently added to the United Nations Security Council Al-Qaida and Taliban Sanctions Committee's blacklist of al-Qaeda-related suspects.

Yandarbiyev played a key role in directing funding from foundations in the Arab states of the Persian Gulf in order to support a radical Chechen faction dubbed the Special Purpose Islamic Regiment, a militant group responsible for the Moscow theater hostage crisis. In January 2004, he was interviewed extensively in Qatar for the BBC Four documentary The Smell of Paradise, where the film-makers called him the "spiritual leader of the Chechens and a poet on the road to jihad."

== Assassination ==
On 13 February 2004, Zelimkhan Yandarbiyev was killed when a bomb ripped through his SUV in the Qatari capital, Doha. He was fatally wounded and succumbed to his injuries on the way to the hospital. His 13-year-old son, Daud, was in critical condition but survived. Some reports also added that two of his bodyguards were killed in the blast as well, but this has not been confirmed.

It was initially unclear who was responsible for the blast, but suspicion immediately fell on Russian intelligence agencies SVR and GRU, both of which denied any involvement, and cited internal feuding among the Chechen rebel leadership. Aslan Maskhadov's separatist foreign ministry condemned the attack as a "Russian terrorist attack", comparing it to the 1996 attack that killed Dzhokhar Dudayev. The car bomb eventually led to Qatar's first counterterrorism law, declaring lethal terrorist acts punishable by death or life imprisonment.

The day after the attack, Qatari authorities arrested three Russians in a Russian embassy villa. One of them, the first secretary of the Russian Embassy in Qatar, Aleksandr Fetisov, was released in March due to his diplomatic status. The remaining two, GRU agents Anatoly Yablochkov (also known as Belashkov) and Vasily Pugachyov (sometimes misspelled as Bogachyov), were charged with the assassination of Yandarbiyev, an assassination attempt of his son Daud Yandarbiyev, and smuggling weapons into Qatar. According to Moscow, Yablochkov and Pugachyov were secret intelligence agents sent to the Russian Embassy in Doha to collect information about global terrorism. Russia's acting Defence Minister Sergei Ivanov pledged state support to the suspects and declared that their imprisonment was illegal. There were some speculations that Fetisov had been released in exchange for Qatari wrestlers detained in Moscow.

The trial proceedings were closed to the public after the defendants claimed that the Qatari police had tortured them in the first days after their arrest, when they had been held incommunicado; the two Russians alleged that they had suffered beatings, sleep deprivation and attacks by guard dogs. Based on these torture allegations and that the two officers were arrested within an extraterritorial compound belonging to the Russian Embassy, Russia demanded the immediate release of its citizens. They were represented by the attorney of the law firm founded by Nikolai Yegorov, a friend and fellow student of Vladimir Putin at Leningrad State University.

The Qatari prosecutors concluded that the suspects had received the order to eliminate Zelimkhan Yandarbiev from then Defense Minister Sergei Ivanov personally.

On 30 June 2004, both Russians were sentenced to life imprisonment; passing the sentence, the judge stated that they had acted on orders from the Russian leadership.

The verdict of the Doha court caused severe tensions between Qatar and Russia, and, on 23 December 2004, Qatar agreed to extradite the prisoners to Russia, where they would serve out their life sentences. The agents however received a heroes' welcome on returning to Moscow on the same day but disappeared from public view shortly afterwards.

Russian prison authorities admitted in February 2005 that they were not in prison and said that the sentence in Qatar was "irrelevant" in Russia.

== Books ==
He wrote many books, consisting of poetry collections, children's literature as well as "radical interpretation of the theory of jihad" with titles like Whose Caliphate? and Jihad.

Political offices
| Preceded by Dzhokhar Dudaev | President of the Chechen Republic of Ichkeria 1996–1997 | Succeeded by Aslan Maskhadov |
