= Said-Khasanom Abumuslimov =

Chechen historian

Said-Khasan Said-Magomedovich Abumuslimov (Note: From the Russified Romanization of Russian: Саид-Хасан Саид-Магомедович Абумуслимов) (Note: also spelled Sait-Khassan Abumuslimov and Said-Hassan Abumuslimov) (Chechen: Сайд-Хьасан Сайд-Мохьмад воӀ Абумуслимов; born 1 February 1953) is a Chechen historian, writer and publicist. From 1996 to 1997, he was acting Vice President of the breakaway Chechen Republic of Ichkeria under Acting President Zelimkhan Yandarbiyev.

== Biography ==
Abumuslimov was born on February 1, 1953, in the Kazakh SSR.

In 1974, he and Khozh-Ahmed Noukhaev co-founded the Chechen separatist group Obshina.

He studied history and the German language at Lomonosov University in Moscow, finishing it in 1981. In 1990, he received his PhD.

Between 1990 and 1994, Sait-Khassan Abumuslimov lectured history at the State University in Grozny. He also took part in the drafting of the Chechen Constitution.

Later, he served in a number of government positions under Chechen separatist president Dzhokhar Dudayev and under Dudayev's successor Yandarbiyev.

From 1996 to 1997, he was Vice President to Zelimkhan Yandarbiev.

Since 1999, Abumuslimov has lived outside Chechnya and has been conducting academic research on different topics. He is member of the Academic Forum for International Security and of the German-Caucasian Society.
