= Abdul-Halim Sadulayev =

Chechen imam and military commander

Abdul Halim Sadulayev
- Ӏабдул-Хьалим Сайд-Ӏелийн

4th President of the Chechen Republic of Ichkeria
- Acting
- In office 9 March 2005 – 17 June 2006
- Vice President: Dokka Umarov (acting)
- Preceded by: Aslan Maskhadov
- Succeeded by: Dokka Umarov (acting)

Personal details
- Born: 2 June 1966 Argun, Checheno-Ingush ASSR, Russian SFSR, Soviet Union
- Died: 17 June 2006 (aged 40) Argun, Chechnya, Russia
- Cause of death: Killed in Action
- Profession: Politician, preacher

Military service
- Allegiance: Chechen Republic of Ichkeria
- Battles/wars: First Chechen War; Second Chechen War

Abdul-Halim Abusalamovich Sadulayev (Note: Chechen: Сайд-Ӏелийн Абусаламин кӏант Ӏабдул-Хьалим, romanized: Sayd-jeliyn Abusalamin khant jabdul-Ẋalim, Sadulin Abusalamin-Kant Abdulhalim; Russian: Абдул-Халим Αбусаламович Сайдулаев, Abdul-Khalim Abusalamovich Saydulayev) (/ˈɑːbduːl kəˈliːm saɪdʊˈlaɪɛv/ AHB-dool kə-LEEM sy-duu-LY-ev; 2 June 1966 – 17 June 2006) was the fourth President of the Chechen Republic of Ichkeria. Sadulayev served little more than a full year as President before being killed in a gun battle with FSB and pro-Russian Chechen forces.

Sadulayev was the first Chechen leader effectively attempting to unify the Islamic rebel forces outside Chechnya, as he had won pledges of loyalty not only from Chechen separatists, but also from Islamist groups seeking the overthrow of the Kremlin's authority across the North Caucasus; this formation became known as the Caucasian Front. He was also credited with persuading radical warlord Shamil Basayev not to carry out any major terrorist attacks since Beslan.

== Name ==
There is considerable variation in writing his name in both English and Russian sources. His surname is variously written Sadulaev, Sadulayev, Saidulaev, Saidulayev, Saidullaev, Saidullayev or Saydullayev; the first two of these seem to be favored by insurgent sources, while the others are favored by Russian sources and Western media. His first name is also written Abdul-Khalim, and is sometimes written with or without a hyphen. In Russian his name with surname is written Абдул-Халим Сайдуллаев or Абдул-Халим Сайдулаев or Абдул-Халим Садулаев, with or without the hyphen.

His full name given by the separatist website Kavkaz Center appears to be Abdul-Halim Abu-Salamovich Sadulayev (Абдул-Халим Абу-Саламович Садулаев).

== Biography ==
=== Early life ===
Sadulayev was born into the Biltoy branch of the Ustradoi teip, an influential clan in the town of Argun on the plains of central Chechnya to the east of Grozny. After growing up in Argun, he entered Grozny's university to study Chechen and Russian philology, but had to break off his studies as the First Chechen War with the Russian Federation broke out in 1994. He joined an Argun militia to fight against the Russians as a volunteer fighter.

Sadulayev also studied Islam under local Islamic theologians, and from 1996 began appearing regularly on Chechen television speaking about Islam. He lectured across Chechnya, and eventually ended up leading Argun's Muslim community as the town's Imam. Sadulayev made the Hajj pilgrimage to Mecca, the only time he is known to have left his homeland.

Sadulayev became the leader of the only Argun jamaat in his city, which was known to carry out missionary activities, as well as policing the neighborhoods. Apart from their religious & civil functions, most of the jamaats in Chechnya also represented military detachments formed to guard villages and towns against the Russian Military and bandits alike. During a standoff between a group of foreign radicals and Chechen authorities in 1998, Sadulayev sided against Khabib Abdurrakhman, a Jordanian leader of a small Foreign/Chechen jamaat who was amassing a militia & advocating extreme violence against Russian and Non-Islamic Chechen peoples alike. After these events, Abdurrakhman was stripped of his Chechen citizenship and declared persona non grata in Chechnya; he died in 2001 while fighting in one of the jamaats as a regular soldier.

In 1999, Aslan Maskhadov appointed Sadulayev to a commission for constitutional Sharia reform, a commission then headed by Akhmad Kadyrov, who would later reject the rebels and embrace Moscow. Maskhadov offered Sadulaev the position of the head of the Supreme Sharia Court of Chechnya, but Sadulaev turned down the offer, explaining that he did not have sufficient clerical knowledge to judge other people.

When the Second Chechen War started Sadulayev again returned to fighting, commanding the popular militia from Argun. Since 1999, Sadulaev had been one of Maskhadov's most loyal field commanders. In 2005, he was designated by Maskhadov to be his successor as president of Chechen Republic of Ichkeria.

=== Presidency ===
Shortly following Maskhadov's death on 8 March 2005, the Chechen rebel council announced that Sadulayev had assumed Maskhadov's position, a move that was quickly endorsed by Shamil Basayev, the Chechens' highest-profile guerrilla commander. After assuming power, Sadulayev called for expanding the Chechnya conflict into a "decolonization" of Muslim-dominated adjoining regions and adoption of a constitution based on Islamic law, or Sharia. He also strongly condemned hostage takings and said that after the end of the war the new president should be democratically elected.

Sadulayev had not only an ideological commitment to maintaining the conflict, but perhaps a personal one as well. Chechen insurgent sources claim that his wife was kidnapped in 2003 by Russian spetsnaz forces and killed by the FSB when attempts to buy her back failed. He had worked to eliminate terrorist violence and urged Basayev and other warlords to direct attacks on "legitimate targets" (including law enforcement officials, federal troops and local civil servants and their offices), and stressed that attacks on such targets should avoid injuring civilians. He appeared to have convinced Basayev, who was enlisted in the formation of the Caucasian Front, that giving up on civilian targets would help spread the insurgency across the North Caucasus.

In February 2006, Sadulayev announced a cabinet reshuffle targeting several top rebel representatives living abroad, including Akhmed Zakayev, who was dismissed as deputy prime minister. Sadulayev also signed a decree ordering all his ministers to be based in Chechnya.

=== Death ===
On 17 June 2006, Sadulayev was killed in a gun battle with the FSB and pro-Moscow militiamen in Argun. According to the FSB chief Nikolai Patrushev, two members of the federal forces were killed and five were wounded in a firefight in which Sadulayev and his bodyguard were killed, and two other rebels escaped. In August 2006, rebel commander Isa Muskiev said the federals and the kadyrovtsy lost five men killed in the shootout, one of them shot by Sadulayev personally, and three fighters escaped.

The body was later moved to Ramzan Kadyrov's hometown of Tsentoroi. Kadyrov said an informant had tipped off police for drug money. Kadyrov said that his paramilitary police had wanted to capture Sadulayev but were forced to kill him when he resisted arrest, and also stated Sadulayev was in Argun organizing "a big terrorist attack" to coincide with the Group of Eight summit in St. Petersburg to take place in July. The killing of Sheikh Abdul Halim was mentioned by leaders of the Moscow-backed official government of the province, claiming that the separatist forces there had been dealt a "decapitating" blow "from which they will never recover."

The next day, 18 June, Sadulayev was succeeded as head of the Chechen resistance by the rebel vice-president and an active guerrilla commander Dokka Umarov.

On 20 June 2006, the Russian human rights organization Memorial posted the findings of its investigation on the Kavkazky Uzel website. According to Memorial's version, Sadulayev's death was accidental; security officials did not know that he was in the house. Memorial reports that on 17 June, about 10:00 a.m., a group of 12 FSB officers and local policemen approached a possible rebel safe house. They immediately came under gunfire as they entered the yard. Two of the servicemen were killed, and the group retreated after throwing a hand grenade into a window of the house. The grenade blast killed Abdul-Halim. This version is contradicted by the official account.

Political offices
Preceded by Aslan Maskhadov	President of the Chechen Republic of Ichkeria 2005–2006	Succeeded by Dokka Umarov
