= Chechen Republic of Ichkeria =

Former unrecognized state in Eastern Europe

Chechen Republic Нохчийчоь (Chechen) Чеченская Республика (Нохчийчоь) (Russian) (1991–1994) Chechen Republic of Ichkeria Нохчийн Республик Ичкери (Chechen) Чеченская Республика Ичкерия (Russian) (1994–2007)
- 1991–2007 (Note: Dokka Umarov, the President of ChRI, "abolishes" Ichkeria and forms the Caucasus Emirate); 2000–present: Government-in-exile
- Flag Coat of arms
- Motto: Маршо йа Ӏожалла! (Chechen); Свобода или смерть! (Russian) Freedom or Death!
- Anthem: Ӏожалла йа маршо "Death or Freedom"
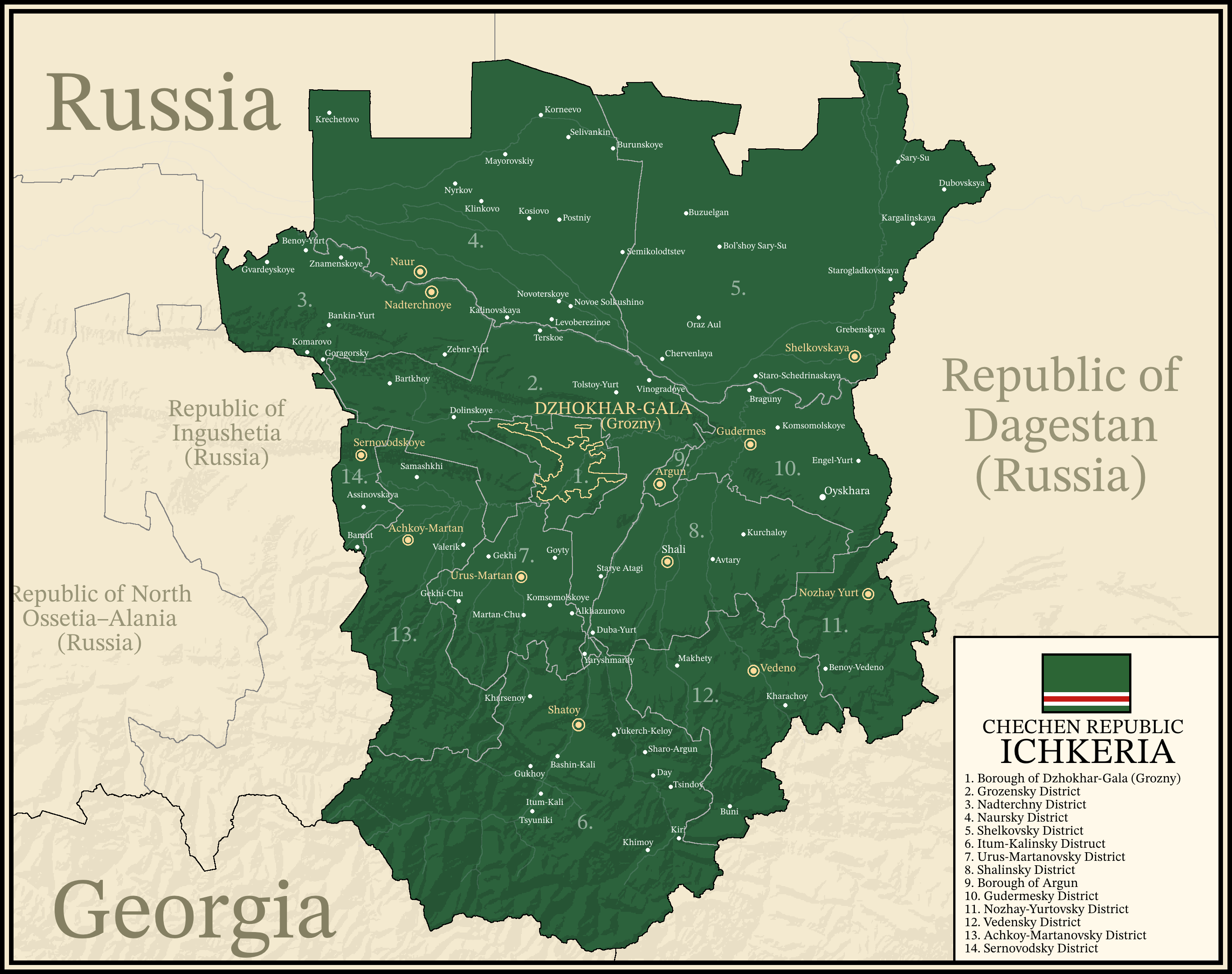
- Status: Self-proclaimed underground government (June–September 1991, May 2000 – October 2007); Unrecognized provisional government (September–October 1991); Independent state (de facto; 1991–2000); Government-in-exile (2000–present)
- Capital: Grozny (named Dzhokhar-Gala from 1997–2000); 43°18′45″N 45°41′55″E
- Official languages: Chechen; Russian
- Religion: (1994) 71–73% Sunni Islam, 27–29% Russian Orthodoxy
- Demonyms: Chechen, Ichkerian
- Government: Unitary semi-presidential republic
- President
  - 1991–1996: Dzhokhar Dudayev
  - 1996–1997: Zelimkhan Yandarbiyev
  - 1997–2000: Aslan Maskhadov
- President-in-exile
  - 2000–2005: Aslan Maskhadov
  - 2005–2006: Abdul-Halim Sadulayev
  - 2006–2007: Dokka Umarov
- Prime Minister
  - 1991–1996: Dzhokhar Dudayev
  - 1998–2005: Aslan Maskhadov
  - 2007–present (in exile): Akhmed Zakayev
- Legislature: Parliament
- Historical era: Dissolution of the Soviet Union
  - Republic proclaimed by the All-National Congress of the Chechen People: 8 June 1991
  - Chechen Revolution: 19 August–15 September 1991
  - Independence: 1 November 1991
  - First war with Russia began: 11 December 1994
  - Moscow Peace Treaty signed: 12 May 1997
  - Second war started: 7 August 1999
  - Fall of Grozny: 6 February 2000
  - Emirate proclaimed: 7 October 2007

Area
  - Total: 15,300 km^{2} (5,900 sq mi)
- Currency: Russian ruble; Chechen naxar (Note: Planned; never entered circulation.)
Preceded by	Succeeded by
Russian SFSR; (Checheno-Ingush SSR)	Russian Federation; (Chechen Republic)
- Today part of: Russia; Chechen Republic

The Chechen Republic of Ichkeria (Note: Chechen: Нохчийн Республик Ичкери, romanized: Noxçiyn Respublik Içkeri; Russian: Чеченская Республика Ичкерия, romanized: Chechenskaja Respublika Ichkeriya) (/ɪtʃˈkɛriə/ itch-KERR-ee-ə; abbreviated as "ChRI" or "CRI"), known simply as Ichkeria and colloquially as Chechnya, was a de facto state in the North Caucasus region. It controlled most of the former Checheno-Ingush ASSR from 1991 to 2000 and has been a government-in-exile since.

In September–October 1991, supporters of Dzhokhar Dudayev seized power in Chechnya during the Chechen Revolution. Dudayev was subsequently elected president of Chechnya and, in this new position, he proclaimed Chechnya's independence from Russia. The move was welcomed by Georgia's president, Zviad Gamsakhurdia, who was one of the first to congratulate Dudayev on his victory and attended his inauguration as president in Grozny. While Chechnya did not receive backing from the international community, it received support and attention from Georgia, which became its only gateway to the outside world that was not controlled by Moscow. Close ties between Gamsakhurdia and Dudayev led to Russian officials, including Alexander Rutskoy, accusing Georgia of "fomenting unrest in the [Chechen autonomous] republic".

The First Chechen War of 1994–1996 resulted in the victory of the separatist forces. Despite achieving de facto independence from Russia in 1996, Chechnya’s institutions were in ruin. Following the war it experienced an economic collapse and a societal breakdown which it was not able to recover from. The government no longer had the strength to control the armed gangs that plagued the country, freely engaging in kidnappings, violence, and slavery. In November 1997, Chechnya was proclaimed an Islamic republic. The Second Chechen War began in August 1999, with Ichkeria falling and subsequently being forcibly subsumed back under the control of the Russian central government in 2000. An insurgency followed soon thereafter, officially ending in April 2009 after several years of conflict. Since 2000, the Ichkerian government has continued its activities in exile. In October 2022, the Ukrainian Verkhovna Rada voted to recognize the Chechen Republic of Ichkeria as "temporarily occupied" by Russia.

== Etymology ==
The name "Ichkeria" comes from the river Iskark in South-Eastern Chechnya, which is a small stream flowing into Belka, a tributary to Sunzha. The term was mentioned first as "Iskeria" in a Russian document by Colonel Konstantin Belevich from 1836. The term was originally used as an exonym for the Chechens, who instead referred to the landscape as "Noxçi-moxk" (Chechen lands). In the 19th century, the Russians began to use it as a toponym.

== History ==
=== Declaration of independence ===
In November 1990, Dzhokhar Dudayev was elected head of the executive committee of the unofficial opposition Chechen National Congress (NCChP), which advocated sovereignty for Chechnya as a separate republic within the Soviet Union.

On 8 June 1991, at the initiative of Dzhokhar Dudayev, a part of the delegates of the First Chechen National Congress gathered in Grozny, which proclaimed itself the All-National Congress of the Chechen People (OKChN). Following this, was proclaimed the Chechen Republic (Nokhchi-cho). A month later, the self-proclaimed republic was declared an independent state.

The Soviet coup d'état attempt on 19 August 1991 became the spark for the so-called Chechen Revolution. On 21 August, the OKChN called for the overthrow of the Supreme Soviet of the Chechen-Ingush ASSR. On 6 September 1991, OKChN squads seized the local KGB headquarters, and took over the building of the Supreme Soviet. Following the revolution, the OKChN declared itself the only legitimate authority in the region. On 27 October 1991, Dudayev was elected president of the Chechen Republic. Dudayev, in his new position as president, issued a unilateral declaration of independence on 1 November 1991. Initially, his stated objective was for Checheno-Ingushetia to become a union republic within Russia.

Dudayev released 640 inmates from a prison in Grozny, many of whom became his personal body guards. Among the prisoners was Ruslan Labazanov, who was serving a sentence for armed robbery and murder, and later headed a pro-Dudayev militia. As crowds of armed separatists gathered in Grozny, Russian president Boris Yeltsin sought to declare a state of emergency in the region, but his efforts were thwarted by the Russian parliament. An early attempt by Russian authorities to confront the pro-independence forces in November 1991 ended after just three days.

According to an article originally published by a Kremlin-backed publication, Komsomolskaya Pravda, and reprinted in early 1992 by The Guardian, Dudayev allegedly signed a decree outlawing the extradition of criminals to any country which did not recognize Chechnya. After being informed that the Russian government would not recognize Chechnya's independence, he declared that he would not recognize Russia. Grozny became an organized crime haven, as the government proved unable or unwilling to curb criminal activities.

Dudayev's government created the constitution of the Chechen Republic, which was introduced in March 1992. In the same month, armed clashes occurred between pro and anti-Dudayev factions, leading Dudayev to declare a state of emergency. Chechnya and Ingushetia separated on 4 June 1992. Relationship between Dudayev and the parliament deteriorated, and in June 1992 he dissolved the parliament, establishing direct presidential rule.

In late October 1992, federal forces were dispatched to end the Ossetian-Ingush conflict. As Russian troops sealed the border between Chechnya and Ingushetia to prevent arms shipments, Dudayev threatened to take action unless the Russians withdrew. Russian and Chechen forces mutually agreed to a withdrawal, and the incident ended peacefully.

Clashes between supporters and opponents of Dudayev occurred in April 1993. The president fired Interior Minister Sharpudin Larsanov after he refused to disperse the protesters. The opposition planned a no-confidence referendum against Dudayev for 5 June 1993. The government deployed army and riot police to prevent the vote from taking place, leading to bloodshed.

After staging another coup attempt in December 1993, the opposition organized a Provisional Council as a potential alternative government for Chechnya, calling on Moscow for assistance.

On 14 January 1994, by Dudayev's decree, the Chechen Republic (Nokhchi-cho) was renamed the Chechen Republic of Ichkeria.

=== First war ===
The intensity of Chechen-sponsored terrorism increased during the first seven months in 1994, when four hijacking accidents occurred, involving people trying to flee Russia for the country. In May 1994, Labazanov changed sides, establishing the anti-Dudayev Niyso Movement. In July 1994, 41 passengers aboard a bus near Mineralniye Vody were held by kidnappers demanding $15 million and helicopters. After this incident, the Russian government started to openly support opposition forces in Chechnya.

In August 1994, Umar Avturkhanov, leader of the pro-Russian Provisional Council, launched an attack against pro-Dudayev forces. Dudayev ordered the mobilization of the Chechen military, threatening a jihad against Russia as a response to Russian support for his political opponents.

In November 1994, Avturkhanov's forces attempted to storm the city of Grozny, but they were defeated by Dudayev's forces. Dudayev declared his intention to turn Chechnya into an Islamic state, stating that the recognition of sharia was a way to fight Russian aggression. He also vowed to punish the captured Chechen rebels under Islamic law, and threatened to execute Russian prisoners.

The First Chechen War began in December 1994, when Russian troops were sent to Chechnya to fight the separatist forces. During the Battle of Grozny (1994–95), the city's population dropped from 400,000 to 140,000. Most of the civilians stranded in the city were elderly ethnic Russians, as many Chechens had support networks of relatives living in villages who took them in.

Former minister of the chemical and oil refining industry of the USSR Salambek Khadzhiyev was appointed leader of the officially recognized Chechen government in November 1994. The conflict ended after the Russian defeat in the Battle of Grozny of August 1996.

=== Interwar period (1996–1999) ===
According to Russian sources, after the Russian withdrawal, crime became rampant, with kidnappings and murders multiplying as rival rebel factions fought for territory. In December 1996, six Red Cross workers were killed, resulting in most foreign aid workers leaving the country.

Parliamentary and presidential elections took place in January 1997 in Chechnya and brought to power Aslan Maskhadov. The elections were deemed free and fair, but no government recognized Chechnya's independence, except for the Islamic Emirate of Afghanistan. According to a 1997 Moscow Times article, ethnic Russian refugees were prevented from returning to vote by threats and intimidation, and Chechen authorities refused to set up polling booths outside the republic.

Maskhadov sought to maintain Chechen sovereignty while pressing Moscow to help rebuild the republic, whose formal economy and infrastructure were virtually destroyed in Russia's war against Chechen independence from Moscow.

In May 1997, the Russia–Chechen Peace Treaty was signed by Maskhadov and Yeltsin. Russia continued to transfer funds for schools and hospitals in Chechnya and paid pensions to its residents. Some of this money was stolen by the Chechen authorities and divided between the warlords. Nearly half a million people (40% of Chechnya's prewar population) had been internally displaced and lived in refugee camps or overcrowded villages.

Chechnya had been badly damaged by Russia's war against the newly formed republic's independence, and the economy was in shambles. According to Russian sources, Aslan Maskhadov tried to concentrate power in his hands to establish authority, but had trouble creating an effective state or a functioning economy. Maskhadov requested $260 billion in war reparations from Russia to rebuild infrastructure destroyed during the war, an amount equivalent to 60% of the Russian GDP.

The war ravages and lack of economic opportunities left numbers of armed former guerrillas with no occupation. Machine guns and grenades were sold openly and legally in Grozny's central bazaar. The years of independence had some political violence as well. On 10 December 1998, Mansur Tagirov, Chechnya's top prosecutor, disappeared while returning to Grozny. On 21 June, the Chechen security chief and a guerrilla commander fatally shot each other in an argument. The internal violence in Chechnya peaked on 16 July 1998, when fighting broke out between Maskhadov's National Guard force led by Sulim Yamadayev (who joined pro-Moscow forces in the second war) and militants in the town of Gudermes; over 50 people were reported killed and the state of emergency was declared in Chechnya.

Maskhadov proved unable to guarantee the security of the oil pipeline running across Chechnya from the Caspian Sea, and illegal oil tapping and acts of sabotage deprived his regime of crucial revenues and agitated his allies in Moscow. In 1998 and 1999, Maskhadov survived several assassination attempts, which he blamed on foreign intelligence services. According to BBC, the attacks were likely to originate from within Chechnya.

In December 1998, the Supreme Islamic court of Chechnya suspended the Chechen Parliament, asserting that it did not conform to the standards of sharia. After Vakha Arsanov, the Chechen Vice-president, defected to the opposition, Maskhadov abolished his post, leading to a power struggle. In February 1999 President Maskhadov removed legislative powers from the parliament and convened an Islamic State Council. At the same time several prominent former warlords established the Mehk-Shura, a rival Islamic government. The Shura advocated the creation of an Islamic confederation in the North Caucasus, including the Chechen, Dagestani and Ingush peoples.

=== Second war and insurgency period ===
In August 1999, Islamist fighters from Chechnya, along with defected militants from other factions, invaded Russia’s Dagestan region and declared it an independent state, calling for a jihad against “unbelievers.” These fighters, led by commanders such as Shamil Basayev and Ibn al-Khattab, operated outside the formal authority of the Chechen Republic of Ichkeria government under President Aslan Maskhadov. Maskhadov's behaviour was contradictory: on one hand he denied the participation of Chechens in the attack and blamed it on Russia; on the other hand he condemned the incursion and denied that his government was involved in planning or controlling the attack.

Maskhadov appealed to Russian President Boris Yeltsin for negotiations and said "show us the terrorist bases and we will destroy them ourselves".

On 14 September 1999, Maskhadov, through his representative Mairbek Vachagaev, proposed joint action with Russia against terrorism and denied any official Chechen connection to the later apartment bombings, stating that if evidence emerged showing Ibn al-Khattab's involvement, that commander would be expelled from Chechnya.

In September 1999, a series of apartment bombings in Moscow, Buynaksk, and Volgodonsk were cited by Russian authorities as the immediate cause for Russia’s renewed military campaign against Chechnya. These bombings killed hundreds of civilians. Although Russian officials blamed Chechen militants, responsibility for the attacks remains contested among analysts and scholars. In 2000, U.S. Secretary of State Madeleine Albright stated that, at that time, there was no evidence tying the bombings to Chechnya.

The Ryazan incident on 22 September 1999 — when local police discovered and initially treated as a real bomb a device containing a sugar-like substance and arrested three individuals who were later identified as Russian Federal Security Service (FSB) agents — added to the controversy surrounding the official narrative. The incident was later described by the FSB as a training exercise, which has been cited by independent researchers as raising questions about the official account of the apartment bombings’ origins.

Across the North Caucasus and in many Western analyses, Maskhadov’s government is portrayed as the moderate wing of the Chechen movement, seeking political negotiation and attempting to distance itself from radical Islamist commanders whose actions it could neither authoritatively control nor endorse. Maskhadov continued to express a willingness for political resolution and dialogue with Russian authorities in later years, though such overtures were largely ignored during the escalation of hostilities. Historians note that Maskhadov’s ability to control all armed groups within Chechnya was limited, particularly after the rise of autonomous Islamist factions.

The escalation of hostilities following the Dagestan invasion and the apartment bombings marked the beginning of the Second Chechen War. Although the official Russian narrative linked the bombings directly to Chechen militants, no Chechen field commander publicly accepted responsibility, and Chechen leadership statements denied involvement. The events of late 1999 were used by Russian authorities to justify a large-scale military campaign in Chechnya, which began on 1 October and ultimately brought significant changes to the conflict’s dynamics and to Russian domestic politics.

As more people escaped the war zones of Chechnya, President Maskhadov threatened to impose Sharia punishment on all civil servants who moved their families out of the republic. This time, however, the Russian invasion met much less resistance as during the First Chechen War. The infighting among the rival factions within Chechnya as well as the rise of radical jihadists convinced several former separatist leaders and their militias to switch sides. Aided by these defectors, the Russians took the minor cities and countryside around Grozny in the period from October to December 1999, encircling Grozny.

After a hard-fought battle, Grozny fell in February 2000; much of the city was destroyed. As on 23 January 2000, a diplomatic representation of Ichkeria was based in Kabul during the Taliban regime in Afghanistan. Other remnants of the government and the armed forces retreated into Chechnya's south which was dominated by mountains and not yet under Russian control. From these bases, they waged a guerrilla campaign, even as Russia cemented its control by establishing a loyal administration in the region. In June 2000, Kremlin appointee, supreme mufti and head of the Spiritual Administration of the Muslims of the Chechen Republic Akhmad Kadyrov became the new controversial head of the official administration of Chechnya. Kadyrov, who has been criticised as the object of a cult of personality, was not democratically elected by either Russian or Chechen constituents. The separatists continued to fight, but were gradually whittled down.

On 31 October 2007, the separatist news agency Chechenpress reported that Dokka Umarov had announced the Caucasus Emirate and declared himself its Emir. This change of status was rejected by some Chechen politicians and military leaders who continue to support the existence of the republic. Since November 2007, Akhmed Zakayev was proclaimed to be the prime minister of Ichkeria's government-in-exile. However, the influence of Zakayev's government was described as "marginal" by political scientist Mark Galeotti who argued that the Caucasus Emirate proved more influential both among the militants as well as within the Chechen diaspora.

From 2007 until 2017, the remaining insurgency in the North Caucasus was mainly waged by Islamist factions, most importantly the Caucasus Emirate. In course of several years; however, the Caucasus Emirate gradually declined and had mostly ceased to exist by 2015. Other Chechen groups continued to operate in Ukraine where they fought against Russia in the war in Donbas. The early pro-Ukrainian Chechen volunteer units included the Dzhokhar Dudayev Battalion and Sheikh Mansur Battalion.

==== Russo-Ukrainian War ====
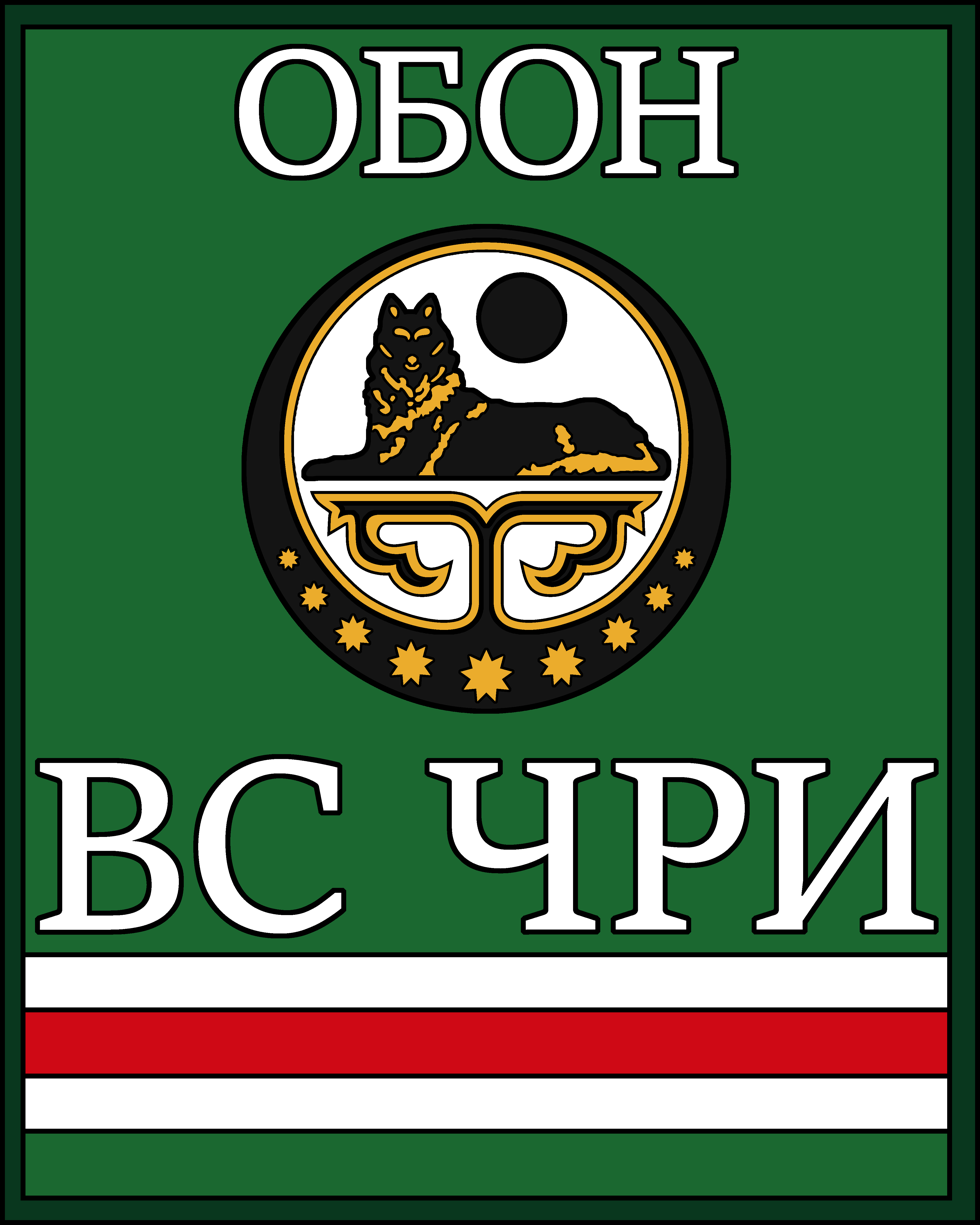
Chevron of the Separate Special Purpose Battalion, a unit organized and managed by the Chechen government in exile fighting alongside Ukraine in its defense against Russia

The Dzhokhar Dudayev Battalion fought on the side of Ukraine since its formation during the War in Donbas in 2014. In 2022, Russia launched a full invasion of Ukraine. Anti-Kadyrov Chechens like the Dzhokhar Dudayev Battalion and Sheikh Mansur Battalion continued to fight in this conflict. In May 2022, Ichkeria's government-in-exile leader Akhmed Zakayev travelled to Kyiv and met with Ukrainian officials for "confidential" talks. Later, the creation of the "Separate Special Purpose Battalion of the Chechen Republic's Armed Forces" was announced by Zakayev; this unit officially styled itself as the continuation of Armed Forces of the Chechen Republic of Ichkeria. A fourth separatist unit, called "Khamzat Gelayev Joint Task Detachment" (named after Ruslan Gelayev) was also founded. As the Russo-Ukrainian War continued to escalate, the pro-Ukrainian Chechen separatists increasingly framed the war as a chance to restore the Chechen Republic of Ichkeria.

On October 15, 2022, the Armed Forces of the Chechen Republic of Ichkeria was officially resurrected in Ukraine by the Government of Ichkeria in exile. On 18 October 2022, Ukraine's parliament recognized the Chechen Republic of Ichkeria as a temporarily occupied state. At this point, Islamist separatists belonging to Ajnad al-Kavkaz had also moved to Ukraine to fight Russia there. In November, the Ichkerian exile government recognized the Holodomor as a genocide against the Ukrainian people.

== Military ==
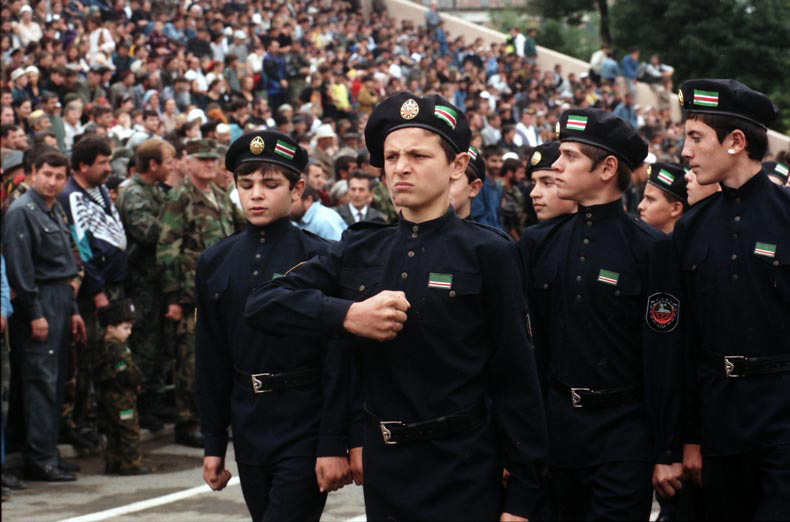
Cadets of the Ichkeria Chechen National Guard in 1999

Dudayev spent the years from 1991 to 1994 preparing for war, mobilizing men aged 15–55 and seizing Russian weapons depots. The Chechen National Guard counted 10,000 troops in December 1994, rising to 40,000 soldiers by early 1996.

Major weapons systems were seized from the Russian military in 1992, and on the eve of the First Chechen War, they included 23 air defense guns, 108 APC/tanks, 24 artillery pieces, 5 MiG-17/15, 2 Mi-8 helicopters, 24 multiple rocket launchers, 17 surface-to-air missile launchers, 94 L-29 trainer aircraft, 52 L-39 trainer aircraft, 6 An-22 transport aircraft, 5 Tupolev Tu-134 transport aircraft.

== Politics ==
Since the Declaration of Independence in 1991, there has been an ongoing battle between secessionist officials and federally appointed officials. Both claim authority over the same territory.

The Chechen Republic of Ichkeria was officially a secular state, with its constitution stating, "The Chechen Republic is a secular state. No religion may be established as a state or compulsory religion." The Spiritual Administration of the Muslims of the Chechen Republic—the Chechen muftiate—was a non-governmental organisation. Despite this, the criminal code of Chechnya legally established Sharia courts and included Islamic hudud punishments of decapitation, stoning and other punishments for crimes such as alcohol drinking, sodomy, and apostasy from Islam.

=== Government in exile ===
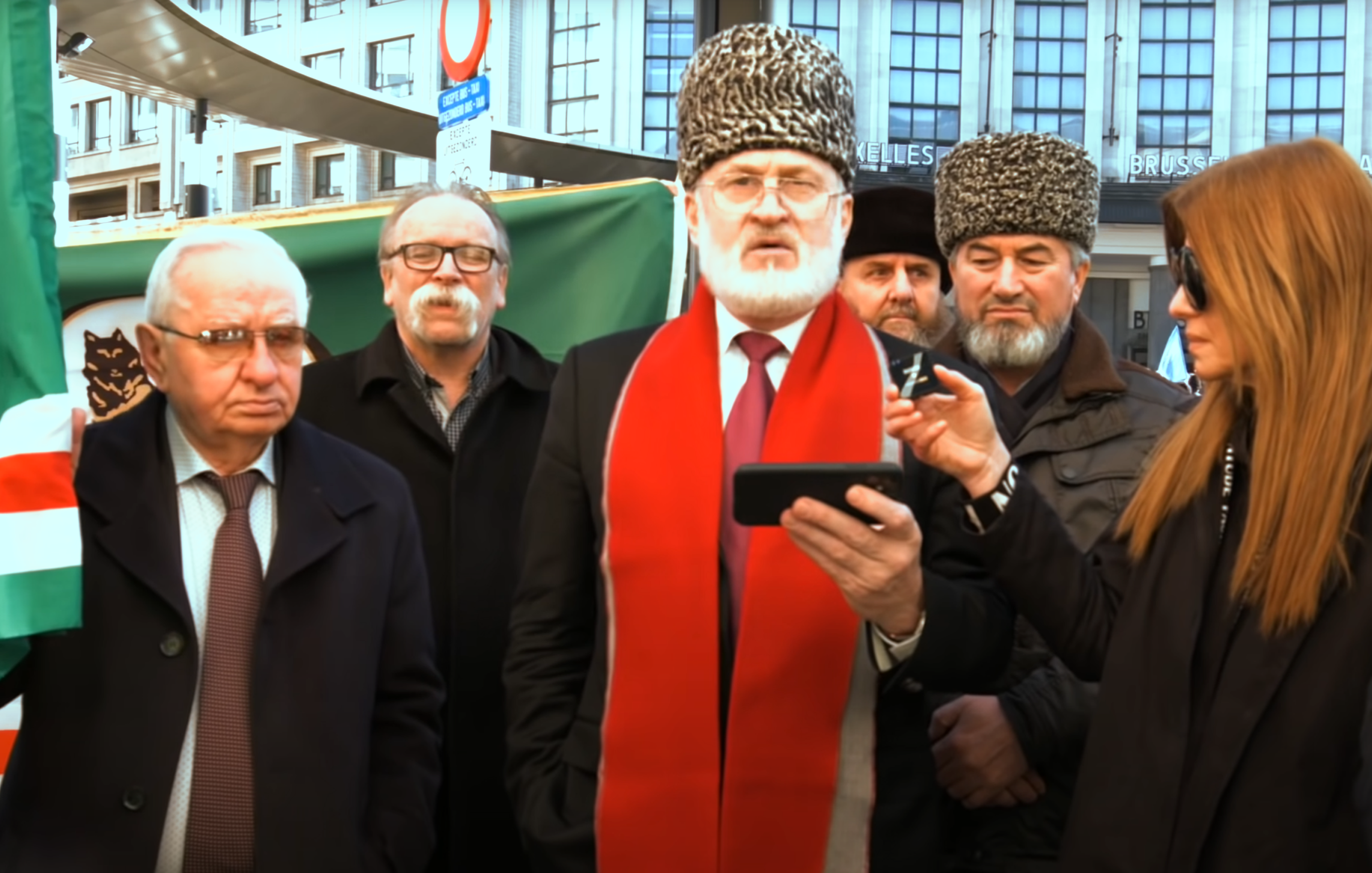
Zakayev and members of his government in exile in Brussels in 2022

After being injured in a car accident in 2000, the Chechen deputy prime minister and foreign minister Akhmed Zakayev had been in the United Kingdom for medical treatment, remaining there as the Second Chechen war turned into an insurgency and denouncing the efforts of Umarov to Islamify Chechen politics and resigning from his government in 2007 before going on to found the Chechen government in exile on 25 November 2007. Since the creation of this government Zakayev has served as its prime minister.

In his role as self-proclaimed prime minister in exile, Zakayev has extensively lobbied European governments from his headquarters in London to pursue more stringent sanctions on Russia, and for support for the Chechen cause. However, Zakayev's actions proclaiming himself as the prime minister are in violation of the Constitution of Chechnya, as there was no parliamentary session nor vote held to transfer power from Dokka Umarov to Zakayev, and with the dissolution of the Chechen parliament it is impossible for such a vote to take place. As such, Zakayev has continued to struggle to unify the Chechen diaspora around him as a dissident group of Chechen exiles led by Dzhambulat Suleymanov compete for legitimacy. The divide in the two groups is that Suleymanov's faction wishes to institute Sharia law should they take power in Chechnya, while Zakayev and his government in exile are stringent secularists, all while Umarov's supporters seeking a restoration of the Emirate are still a powerful voice in the diaspora with hundreds, if not thousands, coming to Ukraine to join various Chechen militant groups after fighting alongside Islamist rebels in Syria.

=== Foreign relations ===
Ichkeria was a member of the Unrepresented Nations and Peoples Organization. Former president of Georgia, Zviad Gamsakhurdia, deposed in a military coup of 1991 and a leading participant in the Georgian Civil War, recognized the independence of the Chechen Republic of Ichkeria in 1993.

Diplomatic relations with Ichkeria were also established by the partially recognized Islamic Emirate of Afghanistan under the Taliban government on 16 January 2000. This recognition ceased with the fall of the Taliban in December 2001. However, despite Taliban recognition, there were no friendly relations between the Taliban and Ichkeria—Maskhadov rejected their recognition, stating that the Taliban were illegitimate. In June 2000, the Russian government claimed that Maskhadov had met with Osama bin Laden, and that the Taliban supported the Chechens with arms and troops. In the aftermath of the September 11 attacks, the Bush administration called on Maskhadov to cut all links with the Taliban. After the 2021 Taliban offensive and the Fall of Kabul (2021) the Islamic Emirate of Afghanistan was restored. It is unknown if the Taliban still recognizes the Chechen Republic of Ichkeria.

Ichkeria also received limited support from certain political factions in Poland, the Baltic countries and Ukrainian nationalists. Estonia once voted to recognize, but the act never was consummated due to pressure from both Russia and pro-Russian elements within the European Union. Dudayev also had contacts with Islamist movements and guerrillas in the United Arab Emirates, Afghanistan and Saudi Arabia.

After the 2022 Russian invasion of Ukraine, the Verkhovna Rada passed a resolution in October recognizing the Chechen Republic of Ichkeria as "temporarily occupied" by Russia.

== Human rights ==
=== First Chechen War ===
The human rights situation in Chechnya during the hostility phases had long been a concern among several human rights organizations such as Human Rights Watch, who, after several years of investigation and gathering evidence, referred to the situation as disturbing. Throughout the span of the first Chechen war, Russian forces have been accused by human rights organizations of starting a brutal war with total disregard for humanitarian law, causing tens of thousands of unnecessary civilian casualties among the Chechen population. The main strategy in the Russian war effort had been to use heavy artillery and air strikes leading to numerous indiscriminate attacks on civilians. This has led to Western and Chechen sources calling the Russian strategy deliberate terror bombing on parts of Russia. According to Human Rights Watch, the campaign was "unparalleled in the area since World War II for its scope and destructiveness, followed by months of indiscriminate and targeted fire against civilians". Russian forces attacked civilians many times throughout the war. One of the most notable war crimes committed by the Russian army during the First Chechen War is the Samashki massacre, in which it is estimated that up to 300 civilians died during the attack. Russian forces conducted an operation of zachistka, house-by-house searches throughout the entire village. Federal soldiers deliberately and arbitrarily attacked civilians and civilian dwellings in Samashki by shooting residents and burning houses with flame-throwers. They wantonly opened fire or threw grenades into basements where residents, mostly women, elderly persons, and children, had been hiding. Russian troops intentionally burned many bodies, either by throwing the bodies into burning houses or by setting them on fire. A Chechen surgeon, Khassan Baiev, treated wounded in Samashki immediately after the operation and described the scene in his book:

Dozens of charred corpses of women and children lay in the courtyard of the mosque, which had been destroyed. The first thing my eye fell on was the burned body of a baby, lying in the fetal position... A wild-eyed woman emerged from a burned-out house holding a dead baby. Trucks with bodies piled in the back rolled through the streets on the way to the cemetery.
While treating the wounded, I heard stories of young men – gagged and trussed up – dragged with chains behind personnel carriers. I heard of Russian aviators who threw Chechen prisoners, screaming, out of their helicopters. There were rapes, but it was hard to know how many because women were too ashamed to report them. One girl was raped in front of her father. I heard of one case in which the mercenary grabbed a newborn baby, threw it among each other like a ball, then shot it dead in the air.
Leaving the village for the hospital in Grozny, I passed a Russian armored personnel carrier with the word SAMASHKI written on its side in bold, black letters. I looked in my rearview mirror and to my horror saw a human skull mounted on the front of the vehicle. The bones were white; someone must have boiled the skull to remove the flesh.

Chechen forces have admitted to the execution of captured Russian pilots throughout the First Chechen War, and of at least eight Russian detainees. In probably the most notorious violation of humanitarian law committed by Chechen Forces, a Chechen unit led by Shamil Basayev captured a hospital and held it as hostage in the Russian city of Budyonnovsk. At least seven hostages were killed by the captors, and the rest were denied water, food, and medicine. According to official figures, 129 civilians were killed during the siege, most by the numerous attempts of the Russian army to retake the hospital. The United Nations Commission on Human Rights had this to report on the incident:

Although the conduct of Chechen fighters has scarcely been documented in non-governmental reports, information indicates that they indiscriminately fired on, and killed, civilians. For example, on 14 June 1995, Chechen commandos took some 2,000 people hostage in the town of Budennovsk in the Stavropol region and barricaded themselves in the town's hospital. The hostage-takers were allegedly shot to death in the hospital by four civilian men. In this incident, over 100 hostages were reportedly killed when Federal forces attempted to take over the hospital.

=== Interwar period ===
Kidnappings, robberies, and killings of fellow Chechens and outsiders weakened the possibilities of outside investment and Maskhadov's efforts to gain international recognition of its independence effort. Kidnappings became common in Chechnya, procuring over $200 million during the three-year independence of the chaotic fledgling state, but victims were rarely killed. In a Los Angeles Times interview with a Russian woman, she states that kidnappers would at times mutilate their captives and send video recordings to their families, to encourage the payment of ransoms. According to her, there was a slave market in Minutka Square, downtown Grozny. Some of the kidnapped were supposedly sold into indentured servitude to Chechen families. They were openly called slaves and had to endure starvation, beating, and often maiming according to Russian sources. In 1998, 176 people had been kidnapped, and 90 of them had been released during the same year according to official accounts. There were several public executions of criminals.

After the First Chechen War, the country won de facto independence from Russia, and Islamic courts were established. In September 1996, a Sharia-based criminal code was adopted, which included provisions for banning alcohol and punishing adultery with death by stoning. Sharia was supposed to apply to Muslims only, but in fact, it was also applied to ethnic Russians who violated Sharia provisions. In one of the first rulings under Sharia law, in January 1997 an Islamic court ordered the payment of blood money to the family of a man who was killed in a traffic accident. In November 1997, the Islamic dress code was imposed on all female students and civil servants in the country. In December 1997, the Supreme Sharia Court banned New Year celebrations, considering them "an act of apostasy and falsity". Conceding to an armed and vocal minority movement in the opposition led by Movladi Udugov, in February 1999, Maskhadov declared The Islamic Republic of Ichkeria, and the Sharia system of justice was introduced. Maskhadov hoped that this would discredit the opposition, putting stability before his own ideological affinities. However, according to former Foreign Minister Ilyas Akhmadov, the public primarily supported Maskhadov, his Independence Party, and their secularism. This was exemplified by the much greater numbers in political rallies supporting the government than those supporting the Islamist opposition. Akhmadov notes that the parliament, which was dominated by Maskhadov's own Independence Party, issued a public statement that President Maskhadov did not have the constitutional authority to proclaim sharia law, and also condemning the opposition for "undermining the foundations of the state".

In 1998, four western engineers working for Granger Telecom were abducted and beheaded after a failed rescue attempt. Gennady Shpigun, the Interior Ministry liaison to Chechen officials, was kidnapped in March 1999 as he was leaving Grozny Airport; his remains were found in Chechnya in March 2000. President Maskhadov started a major campaign against hostage-takers, and on 25 October 1998, Shadid Bargishev, Chechnya's top anti-kidnapping official, was killed in a remote controlled car bombing. Bargishev's colleagues then insisted they would not be intimidated by the attack and would go ahead with their offensive. Other anti-kidnapping officials blamed the attack on Bargishev's recent success in securing the release of several hostages, including 24 Russian soldiers and an English couple. Maskhadov blamed the rash of abductions in Chechnya on unidentified "outside forces" and their Chechen henchmen, allegedly those who joined Pro-Moscow forces during the second war.

According to the Chechen government at least part of the kidnappings were orchestrated by the Federal Security Service, which was behind the kidnappings and financed them.

=== Second Chechen War ===
The Second Chechen War saw a new wave of war crimes and violation of International humanitarian law. Both sides have been criticised by international organizations of violating the Geneva Conventions. Russian forces have since the beginning of the conflict indiscriminately and disproportionately bombed and shelled civilian objects, resulting in heavy civilian casualties. In October 1999, powerful ballistic missiles were fired on the Grozny central market, resulting in hundreds of casualties. Russian forces have throughout the campaign ignored to follow their Geneva convention obligations, and has taken little responsibility of protecting the civilian population. Russian media reports state that Russian soldiers were sometimes sold into slavery by their commanders. According to Amnesty International, Chechen civilians have been purposely targeted by Russian forces, in apparent disregard of humanitarian law. The situation has been described by Amnesty International as a Russian campaign to punish an entire ethnic group, on the pretext of "fighting crime and terrorism". In one such occasion, Thermobaric weapons were fired on the village of Katyr-Yurt, in what is known as the bombing of Katyr-Yurt. Hundreds of civilians died as a result of the Russian bombardment and the following sweep after. Thermobaric weapons have been used by the Russian army on several occasions according to Human Rights Watch. In what is regarded as one of gravest war crimes in the war, Russian federal forces went on a village-sweep (zachistka), summarily executing dozens of people and committing crimes in what is known as the Novye Aldi massacre.

During the Second Chechen War, Chechen and Chechen-led militants have on several occasions used terrorism against civilian targets. In one such occasion, three suicide bombers ran a truck filled with explosives into the Grozny governmental headquarters, resulting in at least 35 deaths. Chechen fighters have shown little regard for the safety of the civilian population, often placing their military positions in densely populated areas and refusing to leave civilian areas. Two large-scale hostage-takings have been documented, the Moscow theater hostage crisis and Beslan school siege, resulting in the deaths of multiple civilians. In the Moscow stand-off, FSB Spetsnaz forces stormed the building on the third day using an unknown incapacitating chemical agent that proved to be lethal without sufficient medical care, resulting in the deaths of 133 out of 916 hostages. In Beslan, some 20 hostages had been executed by their captors before the assault, and the ill-prepared assault itself resulted in 294 more casualties. A report by Human Rights Watch states that without minimizing the abuses committed by Chechen fighters, the main reason for civilian suffering in the Second Chechen War came as a result of the abuses committed by the Russian forces on the civilian population.

=== Minorities ===
Ethnic Russians made up 29% of the Chechnya's population before the war, and they generally opposed independence. Due to the mounting anti-Russian sentiment following the declaration of independence and the fear of an upcoming war, by 1994 over 200,000 ethnic Russians decided to leave the independence-striving republic. Ethnic Russians left behind faced constant harassment and violence. The separatist government acknowledged the violence but did nothing to address it, blaming it on Russian provocateurs. Russians became a soft target for criminals, as they knew the Chechen police would not intervene in their defence. The start of the First Chechen War in 1994 and the first bombing of Grozny created a second wave of ethnic Russian refugees. By the end of the conflict in 1996, the Russian community had nearly vanished.

== International recognition ==
No states currently recognize the independence of the Chechen Republic of Ichkeria.

=== Former recognition ===
	State	Date of recognition	Diplomatic relations established	Notes
1	Georgia	13 March 1992	1992	On March 13, 1992, Zviad Gamsakhurdia's government in exile, which was deposed during the 1991–1992 Georgian coup d'état, recognized the Chechen Republic of Ichkeria and established diplomatic relations. Gamsakhurdia's government was briefly reestablished in Georgia from 2 September to 6 November 1993 during the Georgian Civil War. It exercised control over large parts of western Georgia.
2	Afghanistan	16 January 2000	2000	On 16 January 2000, the Islamic Emirate of Afghanistan, which was itself broadly unrecognized as the legitimate government of Afghanistan, recognized the Chechen Republic of Ichkeria as independent. In 2000 the Chechens set up an embassy in Kabul; however, relations became tense, Maskhadov soon stated that the Taliban were illegitimate and rejected their recognition, and the recognition ended after the United States invasion of Afghanistan. After the 2021 Taliban offensive the Islamic Emirate of Afghanistan was restored; it is unknown if the Taliban still recognizes the Chechen Republic of Ichkeria.

=== Other notes ===
	State	Notes
1	Ukraine	On October 18, 2022, the Verkhovna Rada of Ukraine recognized the Chechen Republic of Ichkeria as "temporarily occupied" by Russia. President Volodymyr Zelenskyy, who has the authority to extend full diplomatic recognition to other states, has stated that he is considering it. Further information: Ukrainian recognition of the Chechen Republic of Ichkeria

== See also ==
- Russia–Chechnya Peace Treaty
- Ukrainian recognition of the Chechen Republic of Ichkeria
- History of Chechnya
