= All-National Congress of the Chechen People =

Political party in the Chechen Republic of Ichkeria

All-National Congress of the Chechen People Общенациональный конгресс чеченского народа
- Founder: Dzhokhar Dudayev
- Founded: 1 May 1990; 36 years ago
- Dissolved: 22 April 1996; 30 years ago
- Ideology: Chechen nationalism Anti-communism
- Political position: Big tent
- Religion: Sunni Islam
- International affiliation: Unrepresented Nations and Peoples Organization

Party flag

The All-National Congress of the Chechen People (Chechen: Нохчийн халкъан дерригкъоман конгресс, romanized: Noxçiyn xalq̇an derrigq̇oman kongress; NCChP) of the Chechen Republic of Ichkeria came to power on 1 November 1991 under president Dzhokhar Dudayev, a former commander of the Soviet air force base in Tartu, Estonia. Since its formation, the organization advocated sovereignty for Chechnya as a separate republic within the Soviet Union. During the period of Soviet breakup, it switched this to explicit support for the separation of "Ichkeria" from Russia.

On 7 September 1991, the NCChP National Guard seized government buildings and the radio and television center. They stormed a session of the Chechen-Ingush ASSR Supreme Soviet, which caused the death of the Soviet Communist Party chief for Grozny, Vitali Kutsenko, who was either thrown out of a window or fell trying to escape, and effectively dissolved the government of the Chechen-Ingush ASSR. Between 1991 and 2000 Chechnya was de facto an independent state.

== See also ==
- Politics of Chechnya
