= Flag of Ingushetia =

Flag of the Russian republic of Ingushetia

Ingushetia
- Proportion: 2:3
- Adopted: 13 May 1994
- Design: A red triskelion sign on a white background, with narrow green horizontal stripes above and below
- Designed by: Ibragim Dakhkilgov

The state flag of Ingushetia, (Note: Russian: Флаг Ингушетии; Ingush: Гӏалгӏайчен байракх, romanized: Ġalġayçen bayraq, IPA: [ˈɣəɫɣəɪtʃʲẽ ˈbəɪɾəq]) a republic in the Russian Federation, is a horizontal tricolour that shows a red triskelion solar sign on a white background, with narrow green horizontal stripes above and below. The white symbolizes purity; the green symbolizes nature and Islam; the red symbolizes struggle against injustice; and the solar symbol symbolizes prosperity of the Ingush people.

Prior to the creation of the state flag of Ingushetia, the Ingush had never had their own national symbols that could reflect their history or ethnicity. This was because Ingushetia was part of different entities and therefore, was under different flags and coats of arms, without a single national symbol of its own.

Following the referendum of 30 November – 1 December 1991 that favored the creation of an Ingush Republic within the Russian Soviet Federative Socialist Republic, the Supreme Soviet of Russia adopted the Law "On the formation of the Ingush Republic as part of the Russian Federation" on 4 June 1992, after which Ingushetia officially became a republic of Russia. There were heated debates regarding the adoption of the flag in the Extraordinary Congress of the Peoples of Ingushetia on 15 May 1993. Finally, on 13 May 1994, the People's Assembly of the Republic of Ingushetia adopted Law No. 1-RKZ "On the state flag of the Republic of Ingushetia" according to a drawing presented by Ibragim Dakhkilgov, a prominent writer and folklorist. On 11 July 1999, the Assembly adopted the Constitution Law of Ingushetia No. 6-RKZ "On the State Flag of the Republic of Ingushetia", invalidating the Law of 13 May 1994. The law regulates the flag's use and display.

== History ==
Flag of the Mountainous Republic of the Northern Caucasus, to which the Ingushetia briefly belonged to in 1917–1921 during the Russian Civil War.

Flag of the Checheno-Ingush Autonomous Soviet Socialist Republic, to which the Ingushetia once belonged to.

Prior to the creation of the state flag of Ingushetia, the Ingush had never had their own national symbols that could reflect their history or ethnicity. Even the coat of arms of Terek oblast, part of which was Ingushetia, didn't reflect in any way the history or ethnicity of the Ingush people as the oblasts and governorates of Russian Empire were not formed on ethnic grounds. In 1917–1918, during the Russian Civil War, Ingushetia briefly belonged to the Mountainous Republic of the Northern Caucasus as part of a separate state-territorial unit and thus, adopted the Republic's flag.

Under Soviet rule, the national flag of the Checheno-Ingush Autonomous Soviet Socialist Republic (founded on 15 January 1934), like other autonomous republics of the Russian Soviet Federative Socialist Republic, differed from the all-Russian flag only in inscriptions in the native languages of the titular nations. Therefore, it bore an inscription in the Ingush language. In 1944 the Chechen and Ingush peoples were deported to Kazakh SSR and Kirghiz SSR and their autonomy was abolished. On 9 January 1957 the autonomy of Chechens and Ingush was restored together with common national symbols of both Chechens and Ingush. On 1 November 1991 Dzhokhar Dudayev declared independence of the Chechen Republic of Ichkeria from the Checheno-Ingush SSR (renamed on 24 May 1991); following the referendum of 30 November – 1 December 1991 that favored the creation of the Ingush Republic within the Russian Soviet Federative Socialist Republic, the Supreme Soviet of Russia adopted the Law "On the formation of the Ingush Republic as part of the Russian Federation" on 4 June 1992, after which Ingushetia officially became an independent state entity—a subject of Russia.

The author of the flag was Ibragim Dakhkilgov. It took a lot of preparatory work of the state authorities, public organizations, artists and scientists to decide on the adoption of Ingushetia's flag. On 15 May 1993, the flag was approved by the Extraordinary Congress of the Peoples of Ingushetia, held in Nazran, and it was decided to continue work on the coat of arms and anthem of Ingushetia. Serdalo newspaper reported that samples of the coat of arms and flag, as well as some texts of the anthem, presented in the congress by the then Minister of Education of Ingushetia, Tamerlan Mutaliev, caused heated debate and there were votes for and against the adoption of the coat of arms and flag.

On 2 August 1993, by decree of the then President of Ingushetia, Ruslan Aushev (r. 1993–2001), a commission on state symbols of Ingushetia was formed. On 13 May 1994, the People's Assembly of the Republic of Ingushetia adopted Law No. 1-RKZ "On the state flag of the Republic of Ingushetia" according to a drawing presented by Ibragim Dakhkilgov. On 11 July 1999, the Assembly adopted the Constitution Law of Ingushetia No. 6-RKZ "On the State Flag of the Republic of Ingushetia", invalidating the Law of 13 May 1994. Thus, the ratio of the width of the flag changed its length of 1:2 to the ratio of 2:3 while the radius of the inner circle of the solar sign and the incomplete circle at the end of its rays have changed. The width of the rays has also changed. On 11 July 2014, by decree of the Head of the Republic of Ingushetia, Yunus-bek Yevkurov (r. 2008–2019), No. 175, this date was established as the Day of the State Flag of the Republic of Ingushetia.

== Gallery ==
=== Timeline ===
Flag	Years of use	Ratio	Government	Description
	1918–1922	2:3	Mountain Republic	4 green and 3 white stripes, with 7 stars on a blue background on the hoist of the flag.
	1937–1944	1:2	Checheno-Ingush ASSR	
	1957–1978	1:2	Checheno-Ingush ASSR	A flag similar to the RSFSR
	1978–1990	1:2	Checheno-Ingush ASSR	A flag similar to the RSFSR
	27 November 1990–16 May 1992	1:2	Checheno-Ingush SSR	A flag similar to the RSFSR
	16 May 1992–9 January 1993	1:2	Checheno-Ingush Republic	The Russian tricolour was used in a temporary basis until 1994.
	4 June 1992–11 December 1993	1:2	Republic of Ingushetia	The Russian tricolour was used in a temporary basis until 1994.
	1993–1994	2:3	Republic of Ingushetia	The Russian tricolour was used in a temporary basis until 1994.
	1994–1999	1:2	Republic of Ingushetia	An older flag with a different aspect ratio to the modern flag
	1999–present	2:3	Republic of Ingushetia	
	1990s	2:3	Ingush separatists (Note: Often used alongside the standard Ingush flag and the Ingush Independence Committee flag)	Flag used by Ingush separatists, consists of three horizontal stripes: a white stripe in the middle and two green stripes at the top and bottom; in the center a red crescent and star is located in the middle and 2 swords below it, and a "الله أكبر" on the sides.

=== Administrative ===
Flag	Years of use	Use	Description
	2010–present	Flag of Magas	
	2014–2016	Flag of Nazran	
	2016–present	Flag of Nazran	
	2013–2020	Flag of Malgobek	
	2020–present	Flag of Malgobek	
	2015–present	Flag of Karabulak	
	2016–present	Flag of Sunzhensky District	
	?–present	Flag of Nazranovsky District	
	June 2016–present	Flag of Malgobeksky District	
	April 2016 – June 2016	Flag of Malgobeksky District	
	2010–present	Flag of Dzheyrakhsky District	

=== Other ===
Flag	Years of use	Use	Description
	2023–present	Flag used by the Ingush Independence Committee	

== Design ==
The flag includes three horizontal stripes: a white stripe in the middle and two green stripes at the top and bottom; in the center a solar sign is located in the shape of a red circle with three rays extending from it, each of which ends in an incomplete circle. The basic description of the flag, along with its ratio, is indicated in the Constitution of Ingushetia:

The state flag of the Republic of Ingushetia is the official state symbol of the Republic of Ingushetia and is a white rectangular panel, in the center of which there is a solar sign in the shape of a red circle with three rays extending from it, each of which ends in an incomplete circle. The ratio of the width of the flag to its length is 2:3. Along the entire length of the top and bottom of the flag there are two green stripes, each of which is one-sixth the width of the flag.

=== Symbolism ===
The white symbolizes purity of thoughts and actions. The green—the awakening of nature, abundance, fertility of the land of Ingushetia, as well as Islam, which the Ingush profess. The red—the difficult struggle of the Ingush people against injustice, for the right to live on the land of their ancestors in peace and harmony with neighboring peoples throughout centuries.

The solar sign symbolizes the eternal movement of the Sun and Earth, as well as the interconnection and infinity of all things. The arcuate rays of the sign are turned counterclockwise, in the same direction that the Earth and other planets of the Solar System rotate around the Sun, as well as the Sun around its own axis. The direction of rotation in the Solar System symbolizes well-being and thus, the solar sign symbolizes the endless development leading to the prosperity of the people. The solar sign in the flag is based on tamgas found during an expedition to mountainous Ingushetia in 1965. An almost identical sign that only differs by having four rays is the ancestral tamga of an Ingush teip of Malsaganäqhan, located in their 17th century-old family castle in Targim in the Dzheyrakhsky District of Ingushetia.

== Protocol ==
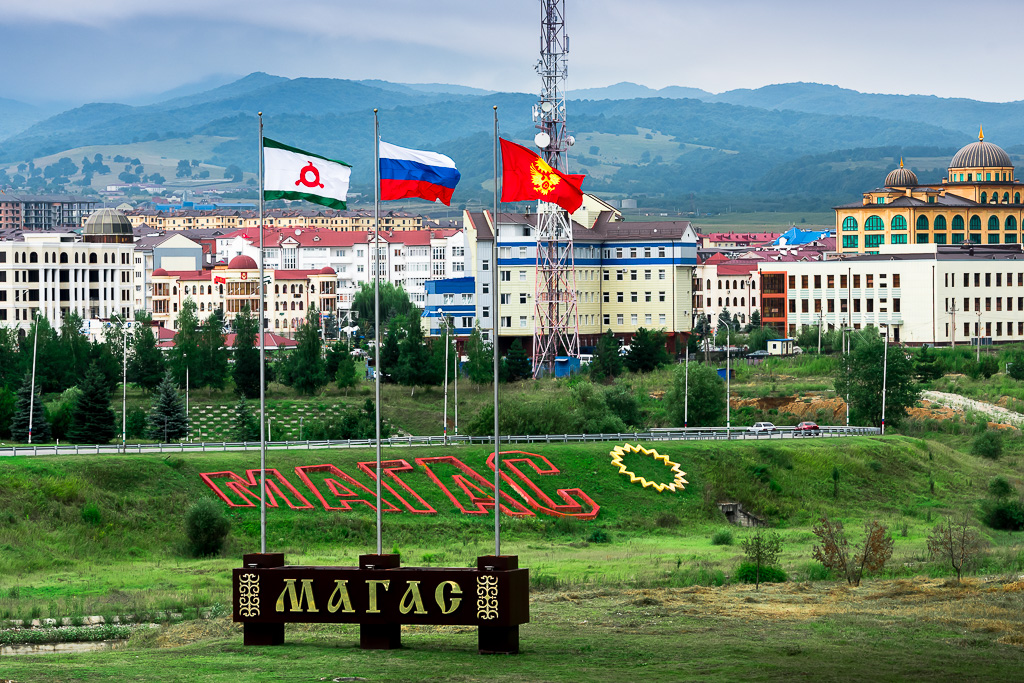
Flags of Ingushetia, Russia and Magas, at the entrance to Magas, capital of Ingushetia.

According to Article 2 of Law No. 6-RKZ of the Republic of Ingushetia, dated 11 July 1999 (as amended on 13 July 2022), the state flag must be raised by the following:

Office	Buildings	Vehicles
Administration of the Head of the Republic of Ingushetia	check	check
People's Assembly of the Republic of Ingushetia	check	
People's Assembly of the Republic of Ingushetia	check	
Government of the Republic of Ingushetia	check	
Supreme Court of the Republic of Ingushetia	check	
Arbitration Court of the Republic of Ingushetia	check	
Prosecutor's Office of the Republic of Ingushetia	check	
Election Commission of the Republic of Ingushetia	check	
Executive bodies of state power of the Republic of Ingushetia	check	
Representative offices of the Republic of Ingushetia in the Russian Federation and in other states	check	
Local government bodies of the Republic of Ingushetia	check	

The flag is raised during ceremonial events held by state authorities and local government bodies of the Republic of Ingushetia; and during public events held by educational organizations, regardless of their form of ownership. It can also be hung on the buildings of public associations, enterprises, institutions and organizations, regardless of ownership, as well as on residential buildings on public holidays and memorable events.

== See also ==
- Coat of arms of Ingushetia
- Flag of the Checheno-Ingush Autonomous Soviet Socialist Republic

== Sources ==
- Kornikov, Arkady (2021). Геральдическое многообразие России. Современные гербы и флаги субъектов Российской Федерации [Heraldic diversity of Russia. Modern coats of arms and flags of the constituent entities of the Russian Federation] (in Russian). Ivanovo: Ivanovo State University. pp. 1–284. ISBN 978-5-7807-1366-1.
- "Конституционный закон Республики Ингушетия от 11 июля 1999 года N 6-РКЗ" [Constitutional Law of the Republic of Ingushetia dated 11 July 1999 N 6-RKZ] (in Russian).
- Ozdoeva, Madina (2022-08-14). "С любовью к народу: К 85-летию со дня рождения ингушского ученого, профессора Ибрагима Дахкильгова" [With love for the people: To the 85th anniversary of the birth of the Ingush scientist, professor Ibragim Dakhkilgov]. Ingushetia (in Russian).
- Patiev, Yakub (2019-07-11). "Три юбилея Государственного флага Республики Ингушетия" [Three anniversaries of the State Flag of the Republic of Ingushetia]. Serdalo (in Russian). No. 101–102. Nazran: Serdalo.
- Pchelov, Evgeny (1997). "Герб и флаг Республики Ингушетия" [Coat of arms and flag of the Republic of Ingushetia] (PDF). Gerboved (in Russian). 14 (26): 113–116.
- Saprykov, Victor (August 1997). "Герб и флаг Республики Ингушетия" [Coat of arms and flag of the Republic of Ingushetia]. Nauka I zhizn (in Russian). No. 8. Moscow: Pressa. pp. 28–31. ISSN 0028-1263. OCLC 145394638.
