= Flag of Chechnya =

Flag of the Russian republic of Chechnya

Chechen Republic
- Proportion: 2:3
- Adopted: June 22, 2004; 22 years ago
- Design: A horizontal tricolor of green (representing Islam), white (representing peace or the Caucasus Mountains) and red (representing bloodshed). The national ornament is at the white band at the hoist.
- Use: Standard of the president of the Chechen Republic
- Adopted: 2020

The flag of Chechnya (Chechen: Нохчийчоьнан байракх, romanized: Noxçiyçönan bayraq) is a rectangle with sides in the ratio 2:3 representing the Chechen Republic, a republic of Russia. The flag is composed of three horizontal bars of, from top to bottom: green, representing Islam; white; and red; superimposed on them is a narrow vertical white band at the hoist, containing the national ornament, a design of four golden scroll shapes.

This flag, introduced in 2004, is primarily used by the government of Chechnya while the pro-independence flags are commonly used by opposition forces.

== Historic flags ==
From 1957 to 1978, the Soviet flag of the Checheno-Ingush ASSR was based on the flag of the Russian SFSR with the addition of a blue vertical bar on the hoist side and the abbreviated name of the Republic (НГӀАССР in Chechen and Ingush, and ЧИАССР in Russian).

In 1978, these abbreviated names were replaced with the full versions: ЧЕЧЕНО-ИНГУШСКАЯ АССР in Russian, НОХЧ-ГӀАЛГӀАЙН АССР in Chechen, and НОХЧ-ГӀАЛГӀАЙ АССР in Ingush.

| Flag | Date | Use | Description |
|---|---|---|---|
| | | Flag of Dzurdzuk and Princedom of Simsim | Plain dark red flag |
| | 1785-1791 | Flag of Chechnya under Sheikh Mansur | Two-tailed dark green banner |
| | 1807 (?)-1831 | Flag of Chechnya under Bey-Bulat Taymiev | Red flag with yellow star in the center |
| | 1829-1834 | Flag of the Caucasian Imamate under Ghazi Muhammad and Hamzat Bek | |
| | 1834-1840 | Flag of Chechnya under Tashaw-Hadji | Two-tailed red banner with green corner inserts. |
| | 1919–1920 | Flag of the North Caucasian Emirate | A plain green flag with a crescent tilted to face upwards, and 3 stars on the top. |
| | 1917-1919/1920-1921 | Flag of the Mountain Republic | |
| | | Flag of Ali Mitaev | |
| | 1937–1944 | Flag of the Checheno-Ingush ASSR | |
| | 1957–1978 | Flag of the Checheno-Ingush ASSR | |
| | 1978–1990 | Flag of the Checheno-Ingush ASSR | |
| | 1990–1991 | Flag of the Checheno-Ingush SSR | |

=== 1991–2000 ===
Several flags have been used by the supporters of the Chechen Republic of Ichkeria. The most common of these is the green flag with the red and white stripes. Its proportions are approximately 7:11. The color scheme is green, white, red, white, green, with the upper two-thirds of the flag in green and the remaining one third in white, red, white and green stripes of equal width, the width ratio of which is 8:1:1:1:1. Another well-known example is similar to this flag but has the country's coat of arms incorporated into the design. Each color is meant to symbolize an aspect of the Chechen national character. Green is the color of life, red symbolizes the bloodshed in the struggle for freedom and white represents the road to a bright future. These flags were mainly used by supporters of Dzhokhar Dudayev, Aslan Maskhadov and their successors. Apart from these several other designs have been used by different factions of the independentist movement, and even single sides used different flags at the same time.

| Flag | Date | Use | Description |
|---|---|---|---|
| | 1991–2000 | National flag of the Chechen Republic of Ichkeria | |
| | 1991–2000 | Variant flag of the Chechen Republic of Ichkeria | National Flag of the Chechen Republic of Ichkeria with coat of arms. |
| | 1991–2000 | Variant flag of the Chechen Republic of Ichkeria | National Flag of the Chechen Republic of Ichkeria with the bottom green stripe removed. |
| | 1990–1996 | Flag of the All-National Congress of the Chechen People | National flag of the All-National Congress of the Chechen People |
| | 2005–2007 | Flag used by the Caucasus Emirate | |

==== Loyalist opposition ====
The pro-Moscow opposition to Dudayev used a flag of similar design with the main difference being the inversion of the red and white stripes. It has not been used since it was replaced by the current flag of the Chechen Republic.

| Flag | Date | Use | Description |
|---|---|---|---|
| | 1993–1996 | Flag of the Provisional Council of the Chechen Republic, Umar Avturkhanov's faction. | |
| | 1996–2004 | Pro-Russian Chechen flag. | |

== Other flags ==
=== Administrative divisions ===
| Flag | Date | Use | |
|---|---|---|---|
| | 22 September 2010–Present | Flag of Grozny | Green background with the red and white stripes, and a drawing of the Akhmad Kadyrov Mosque on the green side. |
| | 2011–present | Flag of Argun | |
| | 2010–2011 | Flag of Argun | |
| | 10 October 2021–present | Flag of Achkhoy-Martanovsky District | |
| | 30 January 2018–present | Flag of Groznensky District | |
| | 10 August 2021–present | Flag of Gudermessky District | |
| | 24 December 2020 – 10 August 2021 | Flag of Gudermessky District | |
| | 19 October 2021–present | Flag of Itum-Kalinsky District | |
| | 17 September 2020–present | Flag of Kurchaloyevsky District | |
| | 23 July 2021–present | Flag of Nadterechny District | |
| | 9 December 2020–present | Flag of Naursky District | |
| | 16 September 2020–present | Flag of Nozhay-Yurtovsky District | |
| | 24 September 2021–present | Flag of Sernovodsky District | |
| | 17 April 2020–present | Flag of Shalinsky District | |
| | 29 July 2021–present | Flag of Sharoysky District | |
| | 17 September 2020–present | Flag of Shatoysky District | |
| | 10 December 2020–present | Flag of Shelkovskoy District | |
| | 1 November 2016–present | Flag of Urus-Martanovsky District | |
| | 22 July 2021–present | Flag of Vedensky District | |
| | 11 June 2021–present | Flag of Shatoy | |

== Gallery ==
| Flag | Dste | Use | Description |
|---|---|---|---|
| | 2020–Present | Adat People's Movement | |
| | 2007–2016 | Caucasus Emirate | A plain black flag with the Shahada on the middle written in white, and a sword on the bottom, modeled after the flag of Saudi Arabia. |
| | ?–Present | Flag used by the Kadyrovites | Identical to the current flag of Chechnya, but with the picture of Akhmat Kadyrov on the center. |

== See also ==
- Coat of arms of the Chechen Republic
- Flag of the Checheno-Ingush Autonomous Soviet Socialist Republic
