= Salambek Khadzhiyev =

Soviet-Russian Chechen petrochemist, businessman, and politician (1941–2018)

Salambek Khadzhiev
- Саламбек Хаджиев
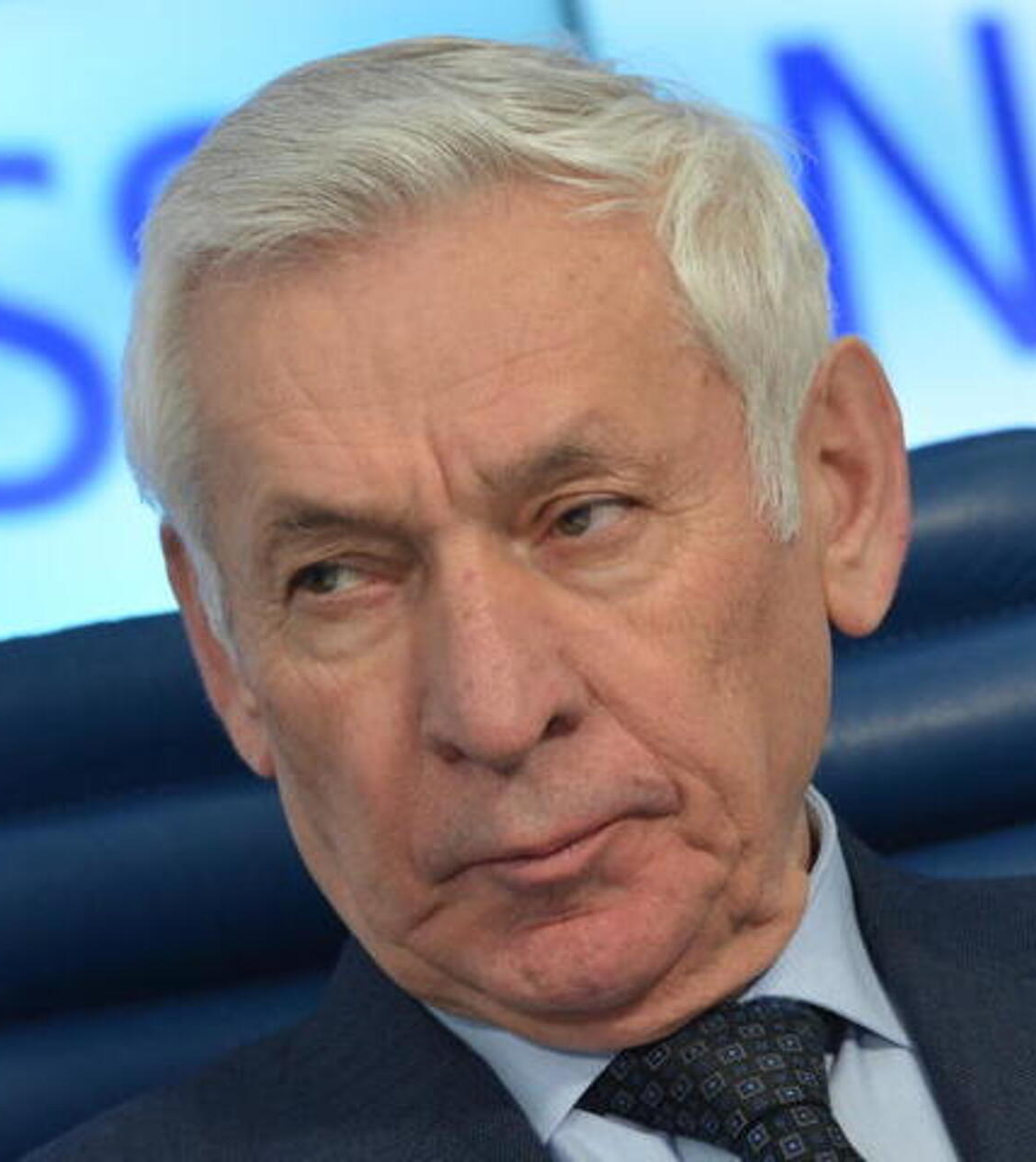
- Khadzhiyev in 2017

1st Chairman of the Government of National Revival of the Chechen Republic
- In office 16 January 1995 – 23 October 1995
- Preceded by: Position established
- Succeeded by: Doku Zavgayev

2nd Minister of the Chemical and Oil Refining Industry of the Soviet Union
- In office 9 April 1991 – 28 August 1991
- Appointed by: Valentin Pavlov
- Preceded by: Nikolay Vasilievich Lemaev
- Succeeded by: Position abolished

Personal details
- Born: 7 January 1941 Shali, Checheno-Ingush ASSR, Russian SFSR, Soviet Union (now Chechnya, Russia)
- Died: 2 March 2018 (aged 77) Israel
- Education: Grozny State Oil Technical University
- Profession: Petrochemist

Salambek Naibovich Khadzhiyev (Russian: Саламбе́к Наи́бович Хаджи́ев; 7 January 1941 – 2 March 2018) was a Soviet-Russian Chechen petrochemist, businessman and politician who was the first Chairman of the Government of National Revival of the Chechen Republic. He specialized in the production of low-pour, high-density petroleum fuels transformations of hydrocarbons on zeolite that contain catalysts. He was also the first and only Chechen to hold a ministerial position in the Soviet Union. In 1991, he headed the Ministry of Chemical and Petrochemical Industry of the USSR. During the First Chechen War in 1995 he was the chairman of the Government of the National Revival of Chechnya.

== Biography ==
Khadzhiyev was born in the village of Shali, Chechen-Ingush Autonomous Soviet Socialist Republic. He spent his childhood in the village of Rovnoye in the Dzhambul district of Kazakhstan, where he was deported with his family. He returned to his homeland in 1957, when the Chechen-Ingush ASSR was restored. He graduated from the Grozny State Oil Technical University with a degree in oil and gas process in engineering.

He worked at the Grozny Oil Research Institute (one of the leading in the USSR oil industry), where he rose from junior researcher to a director.

In 1990 he was elected a deputy of the Supreme Council of the Chechen-Ingushetia of the 9th convocation.

In 1991, Khadzhiyev became the Minister of the Petrochemical Industry of the Soviet Union, becoming the first Chechen in the USSR to hold a ministerial position. He was a member of scientific council and the Interdepartmental Council of the USSR Academy of Sciences and a member of the State Committee for Science and Technology of the USSR on petrochemistry. He was a member of the editorial board of the journal "Chemistry and Technology of Fuel and Oils" and authored numerous scientific papers.

=== Chairman of the government of national revival of Chechnya ===
In 1995, during the First Chechen War, he headed the Government of the Provisional Council of the Chechen Republic.

The appointment took place on 16 January, on the day of the televised address of the Prime Minister of Russia Viktor Chernomyrdin to the Russian people, in which he announced the intention of the federal leadership to form a capable government in Chechnya for a transitional period. According to other sources, he headed the Government of the National Revival of Chechnya on November 23, 1994. In March, Khadzhiev met with the president of Russia, Boris Yeltsin, at his residence outside Moscow in his capacity as head of a federal subject.

In July 1995, he announced his resignation, which was regarded by the journalists of the Kommersant newspaper as the readiness of the federal authorities to sacrifice figures in anticipation of possible negotiations with the separatists of Dzhokhar Dudayev. However, he resigned later on October 23, 1995. After being removed from this post, at the end of 1995, he was then appointed as the first deputy head of the territorial administration of federal executive bodies in the Chechen Republic.

=== In Russia ===
In 1995, he was involved in the organization of the Southern Oil Company.

In March 1996, Khadzhiyev participated in a meeting of the VIP club of the Chamber of Commerce and Industry of the Russian Federation as chairman of the State Committee for Industrial Policy.

In 1996, Salambek Khadzhiev became a member of the board of directors of Ecotech Oil, a large trading company that supplies gasoline to the Moscow Region and regions of Central Russia, and then headed it. He is also the owner of 80 percent of the shares of this company. In April 2002, he sold 50 gas stations owned by the company to Slavneft.

== Personal life and death ==
He was married to Svetlana Muslimovna Gairbekova and had 3 children: Leila, Aset and Bulat. He also has ten grandchildren. His sister, Tamara Khadzhieva, was the head of the Shali district branch of the United Russia party since its founding in 2002. In July 2004 she was killed by unknown perpetrators from gunshot wounds in her own house in Shali. Earlier in the same year, two close relatives of Salambek Khadzhiev, who were employees of the Shali District Department of Internal Affairs, were killed as well.

He died after a severe long illness in a clinic in Israel on March 2, 2018. He was buried in Chechnya, in his home city of Shali at a family cemetery.
