= Naursky =

Naursky (masculine), Naurskaya (feminine), or Naurskoye (neuter) may refer to:

- Naursky District, a district of the Chechen Republic, Russia
- Naurskaya, a rural locality (a stanitsa) in Naursky District of the Chechen Republic, Russia
