= Prime Minister of Ichkeria =

- State Emblem
- Residence: Grozny
- Appointer: President of Ichkeria
- Formation: 9 November 1991
- First holder: Dzhokhar Dudayev

This is a list of prime ministers (officially chairmen of the Cabinet of Ministers) of the unrecognised Chechen Republic of Ichkeria, a breakaway republic that controlled most of Chechnya from 1991 to 2000 (see First Chechen War, Second Chechen War).

== Prime ministers of Ichkeria ==
| No. | Portrait | Name (Birth–Death) | Term of office | |
| No. | Portrait | Name (Birth–Death) | Took office | Left office |
|---|---|---|---|---|
| 1 | | Dzhokhar Dudayev (1944–1996) | 9 November 1991 | 21 April 1996 |
| 2 | | Zelimkhan Yandarbiyev (1952–2004) | 21 April 1996 | 16 October 1996 |
| 3 | | Aslan Maskhadov (1951–2005) (1st Term) | 16 October 1996 | 1 January 1997 |
| 4 | | Ruslan Gelayev (1964–2004) | 1 January 1997 | February 1997 |
| 5 | | Aslan Maskhadov (1951–2005) (2nd Term) | February 1997 | 1 January 1998 |
| 6 | | Shamil Basayev (1965–2006) | 1 January 1998 | 3 July 1998 |
| 7 | | Aslan Maskhadov (1951–2005) (3rd Term) | 3 July 1998 | February 2000 |

== Prime ministers in exile ==
- Aslan Maskhadov (February 2000 — 8 March 2005)
- Abdul-Halim Sadulayev (23 August 2005 — 17 June 2006)
- Dokka Umarov (17 June 2006 — 11 October 2007)
- Akhmed Zakayev (2007 — present)

== See also ==
- Politics of Chechnya
- Vice President of Ichkeria

== Sources ==
- World Statesmen.org – Chechnya in Rebellion
