= Coat of arms of the Chechen Republic =

Emblem of the Chechen Republic, Russia

- Armiger: Ramzan Kadyrov, Head of the Chechen Republic
- Adopted: June 22, 2004

The coat of arms of the Chechen Republic is the official symbol of the Chechen Republic. Approved by acting President of Chechnya Sergey Abramov on 22 June 2004.

== Description ==
The decree of the President of the Chechen Republic of 22 June 2004 No. 125 The regulations on the State emblem of the Chechen Republic

This Regulation establishes the national emblem of the Chechen Republic, their description and order of official use.

The state emblem of the Chechen Republic (hereinafter — the coat of Arms) is the official state symbol of the Chechen Republic.

In the basis of the composition of the coat of Arms formed a figure of a stylized solution that meets national mentality and choice of the Chechen people in the modern world.

Linear-graphic composition of the coat of Arms is made on the basis of a circle in two-dimensional plane. Color scheme based on four colors: red, yellow, blue and neutral white.

In the inner part of the white circle depicts the Symbol of Unity, Eternity in the form of Chechen national ornament, painted in red color.

Stylized mountains, the historic tower of Chechens and oil derrick painted blue.

The composition of the square in the circle.

Yellow wheat ears on a blue background symmetrically framed by the inner circle, symbolizing the wealth of the Chechen people. In the upper part of the ears of corn crowned with the Crescent and star, colored in yellow on a blue background. On the outer red circle shows the pattern of the Chechen ornaments in the national style on a yellow background. The outer border of the emblem is blue.

== History ==
=== North Caucasian Emirate ===
In 1919, the North Caucasian Emirate has taken the issue of paper money (credit notes) dignity 5, 25, 50, 100, 250, 500 rubles. On the front side of the banknotes portrayed the emblem of the Emirate.

Coat of arms (emblem) of the Emirate consisted of a pyramid set by rifle and sword, over them, Haji turban with the crown. On top of all scales, probably symbolizing justice. On the scales with one hand the green flag of Jihad with the top in the form of a Crescent (the topping was portrayed not always), and on the other hand an open book (presumably the Qur'an). In the lower part of the coat of arms was located a Crescent moon and three stars.

In March 1920, under pressure from the Bolsheviks of the North Caucasus, Emirate was abolished; Uzun-Haji was given the post of mufti of the Caucasus, and in the summer died.

=== Checheno-Ingush Autonomous Soviet Socialist Republic ===
The VIII extraordinary session of the Supreme Council Checheno-Ingush Autonomous Soviet Socialist Republic 6th convocation on May 26, 1978 adopted a new Constitution of ChIASSR. Description of state characters in it were slightly different from the former. July 24, 1981 a resolution was adopted on the coat-of-arms, which recognized the pre-existing coat of arms.

=== Chechen Republic of Ichkeria ===
The coat of arms of the Chechen Republic of Ichkeria was a symbolic image of a reclining she-wolf with her head. The wolf is at the national ornament, rolling the circle into a Crescent, in the lower part of which there are 9 stars that correspond to the number of Chechen societies — tukkums. Legally it was found only the description of the coat of arms, the authorities of the Chechen Republic of Ichkeria used different variations of the coat of arms, most often black-and-white image. The author of blazon is the Chechen artist Sultan Usaev. This coat of arms was presented for the first time during the First Chechen Congress in 1990 in Grozny.

=== Modern coat of arms ===
In 2003, immediately after the election of President Akhmad Kadyrov began to develop a new emblem and flag of Chechnya. President Akhmad Kadyrov was supposed to consider the symbolism on 3 March. But this did not happen. February 25, 2004, the state Council of the Chechen Republic approved the new state symbols — the coat of arms and flag. The new Chechen coat of arms was approved by the decree of acting President of the Chechen Republic Sergey Abramov No. 125, dated June 22, 2004.

North Caucasian Emirate (1919–1920)

Checheno-Ingush Autonomous Soviet Socialist Republic (1957–1978)

Checheno-Ingush Autonomous Soviet Socialist Republic (1978–1990) and the Checheno-Ingush Soviet Socialist Republic (1990–1991)

Chechen Republic of Ichkeria (1991–2000)

second variant of coat of arms of Chechen Republic of Ichkeria (1991–2000)

Chechnya (2003-2019)

== See also ==
- Flag of Chechnya
- Emblem of the Checheno-Ingush Autonomous Soviet Socialist Republic
