= Checheno-Ingush Regional Committee of the Communist Party of the Soviet Union =

The First Secretary of the Checheno-Ingush regional branch of the Communist Party of the Soviet Union was the position of highest authority in the Chechen AO (1922–34), Checheno-Ingush AO (1934–36), Checheno-Ingush ASSR (1936–44, 1957–91) and the Grozny Oblast (1944–57) in the Russian SFSR of the Soviet Union. The position was created in November 1922, and abolished on August 23, 1991. The First Secretary was a de facto appointed position usually by the Politburo or the General Secretary himself.

== List of First Secretaries of the Checheno-Ingush Communist Party ==
Name	Term of Office		Life years
Name	Start	End	Life years
First Secretaries of the Oblast Committee of the Communist Party
Tashtemir Eldarkhanov	November 1922	1923	1870–1934
Aznarashvili	1923	January 1924	
Magomed Eneyev	January 1924	December 1925	1897–1928
Efrem Eshba	January 1926	August 25, 1927	1893–1939
Gurgen Bulat	August 25, 1927	1929	
Solomon Khasman	1929	1930	1886–1938
Georgy Karib (Tovmasyan)	1930	November 30, 1933	1896–1938
Georgy Makharadze	November 30, 1933	1935	1898–1938
Vasily Yegorov	1935	October 10, 1937	1899–1950
Fyodor Bykov	October 10, 1937	May 1940	1901–1980
Viktor Ivanov	May 1940	March 7, 1944	1903–1969
First Secretaries of the Oblast Committee of the Communist Party (Grozny Oblast)
Pyotr Cheplakov	March 1944	September 1949	1906–1985
Ivan Zhegalin	September 1949	1955	1906–1984
Aleksandr Yakovlev	1955	1957	1911–
First Secretaries of the Communist Party (Checheno-Ingush ASSR)
Aleksandr Yakovlev	1957	January 1959	1911–
Aleksandr Trofimov	January 1959	September 1963	1903–1980
Fyodor Titov	September 1963	January 11, 1966	1910–1989
Semyon Apryatkin	January 11, 1966	July 1975	1911–1977
Aleksandr Vlasov	July 1975	July 31, 1984	1932–2002
Vladimir Foteyev	July 31, 1984	July 1, 1989	1935–
Doku Zavgayev	July 1, 1989	August 23, 1991	1940–

== Sources ==
- World Statesmen.org
