= Doku Zavgayev =

Soviet-Russian Chechen diplomat and politician

- Завгаев Доку
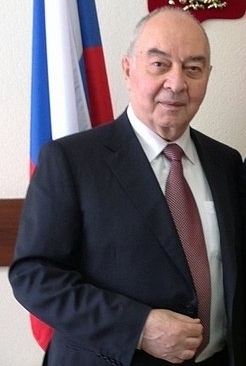
- Zavgayev in 2013

Chairman of the Government of the Chechen Republic
- In office 24 October 1995 – March 1996
- Preceded by: Salambek Khadzhiyev
- Succeeded by: Sanaki Arbiyev

First Secretary of the Checheno-Ingush Regional Committee of the Communist Party of the Soviet Union
- In office 1 July 1989 – 23 August 1991
- Preceded by: Vladimir Foteyev
- Succeeded by: Position abolished

Chairman of the Supreme Soviet of the Checheno-Ingush ASSR
- In office March 1990 – 6 September 1991
- First Secretary: Himself
- Head of government: Musa Karimov; Sergey Bekov
- Preceded by: Khazhbikar Bokov
- Succeeded by: Position abolished (Dzhokhar Dudayev as President of Ichkeria; Khuseyn Akhmadov as Chairman of the Provisional Supreme Soviet of the Checheno-Ingush SSR)

Personal details
- Born: 22 December 1940 (age 85) Beno-Yurt, Checheno-Ingush ASSR, Russian SFSR, Soviet Union (now Chechnya, Russia)
- Party: Communist Party of the Soviet Union (until 1991)
- Other offices: 1996–2004: Russian ambassador to Tanzania; 2004–2009: Deputy Minister of Foreign Affairs, Director General of the Ministry of Foreign Affairs; 2009–2019: Russian ambassador to Slovenia

Doku Gapurovich Zavgayev (Russian: Доку Гапурович Завгаев; Chechen: Завгаев Доку; born 22 December 1940) is a Soviet and Russian diplomat and politician from Chechnya. He was the leader of the Checheno-Ingush ASSR.

== Communist leadership ==
In 1989, Zavgayev, a former collective farm manager and senior Communist Party official, was elected as the first Chechen First Secretary of the Checheno-Ingush ASSR since the Chechens' return in 1957.

In August 1991 Zavgayev, then communist leader of the Checheno-Ingush ASSR, supported the 1991 Soviet coup d'état attempt against Soviet President Mikhail Gorbachev (according to other sources, he took a neutral position).

On 6 September 1991, supporters of the All-National Congress of the Chechen People (NCChP) led by Dzhokhar Dudayev, stormed a session of the Chechen-Ingush ASSR Supreme Soviet, killing Chairman of the Executive Committee of the Grozny City Council, Vitaly Kutsenko, severely injuring several other Soviet members, and establishing the Chechen Republic of Ichkeria. Zavgayev, the Chairman of the Soviet, was not present. Trying to avoid further bloodshed he was compelled to leave the republic, publicly announcing that he would return.

== First Chechen War ==
By 1994, both the president of Russia, Boris Yeltsin and the heads of the "force ministries" were convinced by Zavgayev that Russia should actively intervene in Chechnya. Zavgayev was appointed a chairman of the pro-Moscow government on 24 October 1995. However, due to the war, he was rarely able to travel outside the heavily fortified Russian-run air base at Khankala, earning him the unflattering nickname "Doku Aeroportovich".

On 8 December 1995, Zavgayev and Viktor Chernomyrdin signed an agreement as a basis for a Russian-Chechen federation treaty which would give Chechnya broad autonomy akin to that of Tatarstan.

On December 17, 1995, he was elected to the post of pro-Russian head of the Chechen Republic, receiving 90% of the votes.

== Postwar career ==
After the 1996 withdrawal of the Russian forces from Chechnya, Zavgayev was appointed Russia's ambassador to Tanzania. From February 2004 he was Deputy Foreign Minister and he was Director General of the Russian Ministry of Foreign Affairs from August 2004 to September 2009. From September 2009 to November 2019 he was Russia's ambassador to Slovenia.
