= Coat of arms of Ingushetia =

Emblem of the Republic of Ingushetia
- Armiger: Mahmud-Ali Kalimatov, Head of the Republic of Ingushetia
- Adopted: 1994

The coat of arms of Ingushetia was instituted on 26 August 1994. In the center of the circle is an eagle (symbolizing nobility, courage, wisdom, and faith) and a battle tower (symbol of old and young Ingushetia). In the background is Mount Stolovaya on the left of the tower and Mount Kazbek on the right. Above the tower, a yellow sun is shining in blue sky.

The name of the republic appears above the seal in Russian (Республика Ингушетия) and below the seal in Ingush (ГӀалгӀай Мохк).

The small triskelion near the bottom of the seal references the flag of Ingushetia.

== See also ==
- Flag of Ingushetia
- Emblem of the Checheno-Ingush Autonomous Soviet Socialist Republic
