= Alla Dudayeva =

Russian author and television host

Alla Fyodorovna Dudayeva (Russian: А́лла Фёдоровна Дуда́ева, née Alevtina Kulikova, Алевтина Кулико́ва; born 24 March 1947) is the widow of Dzhokhar Dudayev, leader of the Chechen liberation movement from Russia in the 1990s.

== Biography ==
Born into the family of a Soviet military officer in the Kolomensky District and trained as a painter in Smolensk, Alla married Dudayev, then a Soviet Air Force officer, in 1967. After the death of her husband during the First Chechen War in 1996, Dudayeva was arrested in Nalchik while trying to flee to Turkey and interrogated by a young officer whom she subsequently identified as Alexander Litvinenko. Released later that year, she worked for the Ministry of Culture of the Chechen Republic of Ichkeria until 1999 when the outbreak of the Second Chechen War forced her into exile first to Azerbaijan, then to Turkey and Lithuania, where she currently resides. She had been working for the Georgia's Caucasus TV Channel, for which she hosted a cultural program since January 2010 until October 2012.

Dudayeva is the author of several books, including the memoirs about her husband.
