= List of leaders of Checheno-Ingushetia =

Leaders of Checheno-Ingushetia
- Emblem of the Checheno-Ingush ASSR
- Appointer: Politburo, Central Committee or any party apparatus and by electoral vote
- Formation: 1921/July 1938
- First holder: Tashtemir Eldarkhanov (as Chairman of the Executive Committee of the Chechen Okrug Soviet); Supyan Mollayev (as Chairman of the Council of People's Commissars)
- Final holder: Akhmed Arsanov (Chairman of the Provisional Supreme Soviet); Sergey Bekov (as Chairman of the Council of Ministers)
- Abolished: 13/22 November 1991

The following is a list of leaders of Checheno-Ingushetia, encompassing leaders of the Chechen Autonomous Oblast (the Chechen AO), the Checheno-Ingush Autonomous Oblast (the Checheno-Ingush AO), the Checheno-Ingush Autonomous Soviet Socialist Republic (the Checheno-Ingush ASSR) and the Grozny Oblast.

It lists heads of state, heads of government and heads of the local branch of the Communist Party of the Soviet Union.

During its existence, Checheno-Ingushetia was a part of the Russian Soviet Federative Socialist Republic (the Russian SFSR).

== Heads of state ==
No.	Portrait	Name (Birth–Death)	Term of office		Political party
No.	Portrait	Name (Birth–Death)	Took office	Left office	Political party
Chairman of the Executive Committee of the Chechen Okrug Soviet (1921–1923)
1		Tashtemir Eldarkhanov (1870–1934)	1921	January 1923	Communist Party
Chairman of the Chechen Revolutionary Committee (1923–1924)
(1)		Tashtemir Eldarkhanov (1870–1934)	2 January 1923	29 July 1924	Communist Party
Chairman of the Central Executive Committee of the Chechen AO (1924–1925)
(1)		Tashtemir Eldarkhanov (1870–1934)	August 1924	27 September 1925	Communist Party
Chairmen of the Executive Committee of the Regional Council of the Chechen AO/Checheno-Ingush AO/Checheno-Ingush ASSR (1926–1938)
2		Daud Arsanukayev (1890–1937)	1926	1930	Communist Party
3		Khan Ramazan Mamayev	1930	September 1931	Communist Party
4		Magomed Khasiyevich Omarov (1902–af.1957)	January 1932	1934	Communist Party
5		Ali Gorchkhanov (1898–1954)	12 January 1934	September 1937	Communist Party
6		Yusuf Tambiyev (1906–1944)	November 1937	July 1938	Communist Party
Chairman of the Presidium of the Supreme Soviet of the Checheno-Ingush ASSR (1938–1944)
(6)		Yusuf Tambiyev (1906–1944)	July 1938	March 1944	Communist Party
Chairmen of the Executive Committee of the Grozny Oblast Soviet (1944–1957)
7		Ivan Starchak (1902–1985)	March 1944	December 1949	Communist Party
8		Georgiy Kovalenko (1909–1991)	December 1949	January 1957	Communist Party
Chairman of the Organizing Committee of the Presidium of the Supreme Soviet of the Checheno-Ingush ASSR (1957–1958)
9		Muslim Gayrbekov (1913–1971)	9 January 1957	15 April 1958	Communist Party
Chairmen of the Presidium of the Supreme Soviet of the Checheno-Ingush ASSR (1958–1990)
10		Ilyas Almazov (1899–1970)	16 April 1958	1971	Communist Party
11		Kureysh Ozdoyev	1971	28 August 1973	Communist Party
12		Khazhbikar Bokov (1935–2023)	28 August 1973	March 1990	Communist Party
Chairman of the Supreme Soviet of the Checheno-Ingush ASSR (1990–1991)
13		Doku Zavgayev (born 1940)	March 1990	15 September 1991	Communist Party
Chairmen of the Provisional Supreme Soviet of the Checheno-Ingush Republic (1991)
14		Lecha Magomadov (1938–2005)	15 September 1991	17 September 1991	Independent
15		Khuseyn Akhmadov (born 1950)	17 September 1991	5 October 1991	Independent
16		Bagauddin Bakhmadov (born 1949)	7 October 1991	24 October 1991	Independent
17		Akhmed Arsanov (1933–2021)	24 October 1991	13 November 1991	Independent

== Heads of government ==
No.	Portrait	Name (Birth–Death)	Term of office		Political party
No.	Portrait	Name (Birth–Death)	Took office	Left office	Political party
Chairman of the Council of People's Commissars (1938–1944)
1		Supyan Mollayev (1900–1973)	July 1938	March 1944	Communist Party
Post abolished (March 1944 – 9 January 1957)
Chairmen of the Council of Ministers (1958–1991)
2		Muslim Gayrbekov (1911–1971)	15 April 1958	20 June 1971	Communist Party
Post vacant (20 June 1971 – 1 July 1971)
3		Ramazan Vakhayev (1920–1990)	1 July 1971	June 1976	Communist Party
4		Musa Karimov (1938–2012)	June 1976	1990	Communist Party
5		Sergey Bekov (born 1939)	1990	22 November 1991	Communist Party

== Heads of party ==
No.	Portrait	Name (Birth–Death)	Term of office		Political party
No.	Portrait	Name (Birth–Death)	Took office	Left office	Political party
Responsible Secretaries of the Organizing Bureau of the Central Committee of the Communist Party of the Soviet Union for the Chechen AO (1922–1927)
1		Tashtemir Eldarkhanov (1870–1934)	November 1922	1923	Communist Party
2		N. S. Aznarashvili	1923	December 1923	Communist Party
3		Magomed Eneyev (1897–1928)	December 1923	September 1925	Communist Party
4		Efrem Eshba (1893–1939)	January 1926	1927	Communist Party
Responsible Secretaries of the Regional Committee of the Communist Party of the Soviet Union for the Chechen AO (1927–1932)
(4)		Efrem Eshba (1893–1939)	1927	August 1927	Communist Party
5		Gurgen Bulat (1900–1949)	August 1927	1929	Communist Party
6		Solomon Khasman (1886–1954)	1929	1930	Communist Party
7		Georgiy Karib (Tovmasyan) (1896–1938)	1930	1932	Communist Party
8		Magomed Khasiyevich Omarov (1902–af.1957)	1932	1932	Communist Party
First Secretaries of the Regional Committee of the Communist Party of the Soviet Union for the Chechen AO (1932–1933)
(8)		Magomed Khasiyevich Omarov (1902–af.1957)	1932	1932	Communist Party
9		Georgiy Makharadze (1898–1938)	1932	29 November 1933	Communist Party
Chairman of the Organizing Bureau of the North Caucasian Regional Committee of the Communist Party of the Soviet Union for the Checheno-Ingush AO (1933–1934)
(9)		Georgiy Makharadze (1898–1938)	29 November 1933	1934	Communist Party
First Secretaries of the Oblast Committee of the Communist Party of the Soviet Union for Checheno-Ingush AO (1934–1936)
(9)		Georgiy Makharadze (1898–1938)	1934	1934	Communist Party
10		Vasiliy Yegorov (1899–1950)	1934	12 May 1936	Communist Party
First Secretaries of the Checheno-Ingush Regional Committee of the Communist Party of the Soviet Union (1936–1940)
(10)		Vasiliy Yegorov (1899–1950)	12 May 1936	10 October 1937	Communist Party
11		Fyodor Bykov (1901–1980)	10 October 1937	May 1940	Communist Party
12		Viktor Ivanov (1903–1969)	May 1940	March 1944	Communist Party
First Secretaries of the Grozny Oblast Committee of the Communist Party of the Soviet Union (1944–1956)
13		Pyotr Cheplakov (1906–1985)	March 1944	September 1949	Communist Party
14		Ivan Zhegalin (1906–1984)	September 1949	December 1955	Communist Party
15		Aleksandr Yakovlev (1911–1989)	December 1955	24 November 1956	Communist Party
First Secretaries of the Checheno-Ingush National Committee of the Communist Party of the Soviet Union (1956–1991)
(15)		Aleksandr Yakovlev (1911–1989)	24 November 1956	January 1959	Communist Party
16		Aleksandr Trofimov (1903–1980)	January 1959	September 1963	Communist Party
17		Fyodor Titov (1910–1989)	September 1963	11 January 1966	Communist Party
18		Semyon Apryatkin (1911–1977)	11 January 1966	July 1975	Communist Party
19		Aleksandr Vlasov (1932–2002)	July 1975	31 July 1984	Communist Party
20		Vladimir Foteyev (1935–2023)	31 July 1984	1 July 1989	Communist Party
21		Doku Zavgayev (born 1940)	1 July 1989	August 1991	Communist Party

== See also ==
- List of leaders of Chechnya (1991–present)
- President of Ichkeria
- Head of the Chechen Republic
- Head of the Republic of Ingushetia
- History of Chechnya
- History of Ingushetia
- Chechen Autonomous Oblast
- Ingush Autonomous Oblast
- Checheno-Ingush Autonomous Oblast
- Checheno-Ingush Autonomous Soviet Socialist Republic
  - 1940–1944 insurgency in Chechnya
  - 1944 deportation of Chechens and Ingushes
- Grozny Oblast
- Chechen Republic of Ichkeria

== Sources ==
- World Statesmen.org
