= Emblem of the Checheno-Ingush Autonomous Soviet Socialist Republic =

- Armiger: Checheno-Ingush Autonomous Soviet Socialist Republic
- Adopted: 22 June 1937
- Crest: Red star
- Supporters: Wheat and Cotton
- Motto: Пролетарии всех стран, соединяйтесь! (Russian); Массо а мехкийн пролетарийш, цхьаьнакхета! (Chechen); Масса а мехкашкара пролетареш, вӏашагӏкхета! (Ingush) "Workers of the world, unite!"

The national emblem of the Checheno-Ingush Autonomous Soviet Socialist Republic was adopted in 1937 by the government of the Checheno-Ingush Autonomous Soviet Socialist Republic. The emblem is identical to the emblem of the Russian Soviet Federative Socialist Republic.

== History ==
On June 22, 1937, the Extraordinary III Congress of Soviets of the Checheno-Ingush ASSR adopted the Constitution of the Checheno-Ingush ASSR, which contained the description of the emblem of the Checheno-Ingush ASSR. The coat of arms of the Checheno-Ingush ASSR was identical to the emblem of the RSFSR, but was supplemented with inscriptions in the national languages of the Checheno-Ingush ASSR.

=== Liquidation and restoration of the Checheno-Ingush ASSR ===
On March 3, 1944 (other sources says March 7, 1944), on the orders of Joseph Stalin, the republic was disbanded and its population forcibly deported upon the accusations of collaboration with the invaders and separatism. The territory of the ASSR was divided between Stavropol Krai (where Grozny Okrug was formed), the Dagestan ASSR, the North Ossetian ASSR, and the Georgian SSR.

On 9 January 1957, by the Decree of the Presidium of the Supreme Soviet of the USSR, the Checheno-Ingush ASSR was restored.

=== Restoration of the emblem ===
The emblem of the Checheno-Ingush ASSR was also restored on 1957, following a decree about the emblem of the Checheno-Ingush ASSR.

==== Second revision ====
The 8th extraordinary session of the Supreme Council of the Sixth Extraordinary of the Sixth Convocation of the USSR adopted a new Constitution of the Checheno-Ingush ASSR on May 26, 1978. The description on the state symbols was slightly different from those that existed before. The only difference was in the addition of the red star above the emblem.

On July 24, 1981, the government of the Checheno-Ingush ASSR adopted a Regulations on the Emblem of the Checheno-Ingush ASSR, which confirmed the design of the emblem.

== Gallery ==
1957–1978

1978–1992

== See also ==
- Flag of the Checheno-Ingush Autonomous Soviet Socialist Republic
- Coat of arms of the Chechen Republic
- Coat of arms of Ingushetia
