= Evgeny Pchelov =

Russian historian (born 1971)

Eugeny Vladimirovich Pchelov
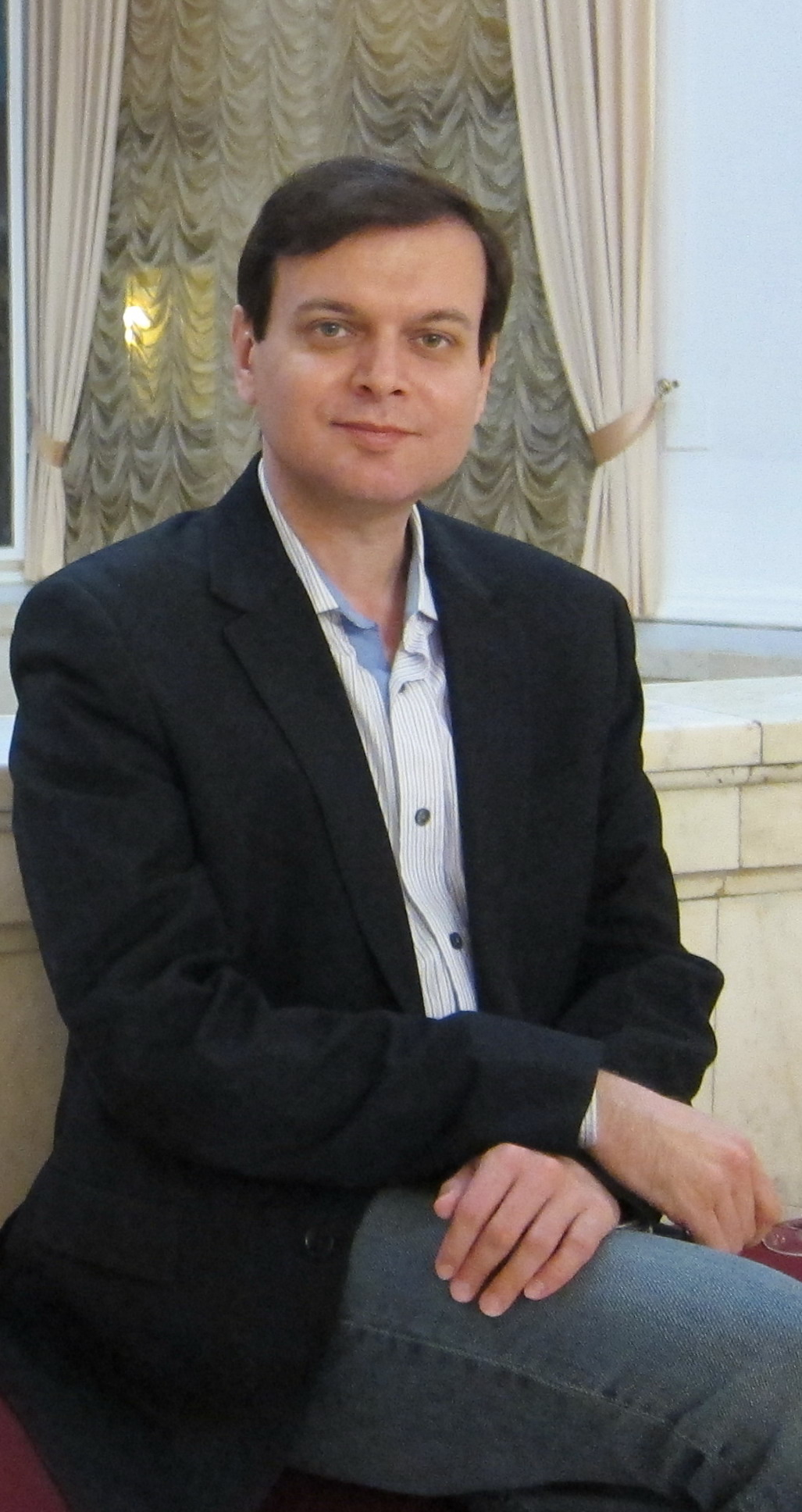
- Born: 1 September 1971 (age 54); Moscow, USSR
- Education: Russian State University for the Humanities
- Known for: Genealogist
- Scientific career
- Fields: History
- Workplaces: Russian State University for the Humanities

Eugeny Vladimirovich Pchelov (Russian: Евге́ний Влади́мирович Пчело́в; born 1 September 1971) is a Russian specialist in history, heraldry, and genealogy. He has published several monographs on history, including Rurikides: History of a Dynasty (2001), Romanov: History of a Dynasty (2001), Old Russian Princely Genealogy (2001), State Symbols of Russia: Coat of Arms, Flag, Anthem (2007), and others.

== List of works (Russian) ==
1. Правители России от Юрия Долгорукого до наших дней.- М., 2000 (совм. с В.Т.Чумаковым)
2. Два века русской буквы Ё. История и словарь.- М., 2000 (совм. с В.Т.Чумаковым)
3. Романовы. История династии.- М., 2001
4. Рюриковичи. История династии.- М., 2001
5. Генеалогия древнерусских князей IX- нач. XI.- М., 2001
6. Генеалогия Романовых. 1613-2001.- М., 2001
7. История России с древнейших времён до кон. XVI в. Учебник для 6 кл. основной школы.- М., 2001
8. История России, XVII-XVIII вв. Учебник для 7 кл. основной школы.- М., 2002
9. Князья и княгини Русской земли IX-XVI вв.- М., 2002 (совм. с В.Б. Перхавко и Ю.В. Сухаревым)
10. Монархи России.- М., 2003
11. Российский государственный герб: композиция, стилистика и семантика в историческом контексте- М., 2005
12. Елена Ивановна Каменцева. Биобиблиографический указатель.- М., 2006 (в соавт.)
13. Вячеслав Всеволодович Иванов / РАН. Материалы к биобиблиографии учёных.- М., 2007 (в соавт.)
14. Государственные символы России: герб, флаг, гимн. Учебное пособие для старших классов.- М., 2007
15. Кабардинская земля в царском титуле и русской государственной геральдике XVI-начала XX века.- Нальчик, 2007
16. Сост., вступ. ст. и коммент.: Родословная гениальности: Из истории отечественной науки 1920-х гг.- М., 2008
17. Рюрик / Жизнь замечательных людей. Вып. 1477 (1277). М.: Молодая гвардия, 2010. 316 с., ил.
18. Экслибрисы и штемпели на книгах Научной библиотеки РГГУ. М., 2010. 440 с., ил.
19. Правители России от Рюрика до наших дней. М.: Махаон, Азбука-Аттикус, 2011. 320 с., ил. (в соавт.)
20. Бестиарий Московского царства: животные в эмблематике Московской Руси конца XV – XVII вв. / Отв. ред. акад. РАН Вяч. Вс. Иванов. М.: Старая Басманная, 2011. 204 с., ил.
21. История России с древнейших времён до конца XVI века. Учебник для 6 кл. общеобразовательных учреждений / Рекомендовано Министерством образования и науки РФ. М.: «Русское слово», 2012. 264 с., ил.
22. История Рюриковичей. М., 2012. 384 с., ил.
23. Рюрик и начало Руси. М., 2012. 60 с.
24. История России. XVII–XVIII века. Учебник для 7 кл. общеобразовательных учреждений / Рекомендовано Министерством образования и науки РФ. М.: «Русское слово», 2012. 240 с., ил.
25. Романовы. История великой династии. М., 2013. 400 с., ил.
26. История России с древнейших времён до начала XVI века. Учебник для 6 класса общеобразовательных организаций. М.: «Русское слово», 2015. 240 с., ил. (соавт.: П. В. Лукин)
27. История России. XVI–XVII века. Учебник для 7 класса общеобразовательных организаций. М.: «Русское слово», 2015. 224 с., ил. (соавт.: П. В. Лукин)
28. История России. XVIII век. Учебник для 8 класса общеобразовательных организаций. М.: «Русское слово», 2015. 232 с., ил. (соавт.: В. Н. Захаров)
29. Рюриковичи: история и генеалогия. М.: Академический проект, 2016. 583 с.
30. Династия Романовых / ГИМ. М., 2017. 184 с., ил.
31. Авт.-сост.: Хрестоматия к учебнику Е. В. Пчелова, П. В. Лукина «История России с древнейших времён до начала XVI века» для 6 класса общеобразовательных организаций. М.: «Русское слово», 2017. 128 с.
32. Романовы: история и генеалогия. М.: Академический проект, 2017. 442 с.
33. Олег Вещий / Жизнь замечательных людей. Вып. 1899 (1699). М.: Молодая гвардия, 2018. 261 с., ил.
34. Династия Рюриковичей / ГИМ. М., 2018. 148 с., ил.
35. Герб России / ГИМ. М., 2018. 100 с., ил.
36. Гербы российских кавалеров в гербовниках датских королевских орденов. М., 2020. 224 с., ил. (совм. с И. М. Афонасенко).
37. Герб России XV–XVII вв.: европейский взгляд на географических картах. М., 2020. 88 с., ил.
38. Сост.: Елена Ивановна Каменцева: Материалы к биографии / РГГУ. М., 2020. 106 с.: ил.
39. Дамский век русской истории / ГИМ. М., 2020. 152 с., ил.
40. Цареубийство 1918 года: источники, вопросы, версии / РГГУ. М.: РГГУ, 2020. 192 с.
41. Символы времени в истории культуры: от Пуссена до метро. М., 2021. 104 с.: ил.
