= Grozny Oblast =

Oblast of Russian SFSR (1944–1957)

Coordinates: 44.0000°N 46.0000°E

Russian map of the Grozny Oblast (1949).

Grozny Oblast (Russian: Гро́зненская о́бласть) was an administrative entity (an oblast) of the Russian SFSR that was established as Grozny Okrug (Гро́зненский о́круг) on 7 March 1944 and abolished on 9 January 1957.

== Formation ==
After the 1940–1944 insurgency in Chechnya, the Soviet government deported the entire Chechen and Ingush population. The vacated Checheno-Ingush ASSR was abolished, and its territory partitioned, with the southern mountainous region being joined to the Georgian SSR, the western Ingush populated area to the North Ossetian ASSR, and the eastern strip of like size to the Dagestan ASSR. The resulting territory was joined with vast Kizlyarsky District and with Naursky District of Stavropol Krai.

Most of the territory in the north was mixed Nogay and ethnic Russian (Terek Cossack), although southern areas did include excessive ethnic Chechen land, that was now vacated. This was settled mostly by refugees from the western regions of the USSR who fled the Nazi German invasion and occupation. By the mid-1950s economically the region became profitable.

== Abolishment and consenquences ==
In 1956, however, the Soviet government issued a new decree on re-habilitation of the repressed peoples. Several thousand Chechens and Ingush took this chance to move back to their ancestral home. This was met with mixed signals, on one hand this allowed for a very potential workforce, on the other question arose of re-establishment of the ChIASSR and a full re-habilitation of the Chechen and Ingush people. The latter created several problems as most of their homes were now occupied by re-settlers. Nonetheless, in January 1957 the Supreme Soviet of the RSFSR re-instated the ChIASSR and abolished Grozny Oblast. However, the pre-1944 borders were not preserved. Kizlyarsky District was passed to the Dagestan ASSR (which administered it during 1923–1937) and two left-bank Terek River districts (Naursky and Shelkovsky) adjacent to Chechnya were retained by the ChIASSR. This was done for two reasons, primarily due to the firm economic ties they developed to Grozny, but also to dilute the new republic's ethnic composition, as they became the central settlement zones for the returning Chechens (to avoid them being re-settled into the mountainous zones).

Upon return, the deported peoples were met negatively by the region's still pre-dominant Russian population, especially in the feuds over land and homes. This erupted in the August 1958 riots where the Russians demanded that either the Grozny Oblast be restored or the ChIASSR be transformed into a republic with no titular nation like neighbouring Dagestan. The riot was put down by the Soviet militsiya.

As a result of this, by the mid-1970s a systematic emigration of Russians from the republic started, due to the social discrimination in favour of the only nationality (all administrative roles of Checheno-Ingushetia by the late 1970s were held by Chechens). By the end of the 1980s, Chechens formed the majority in all mountainous regions, and almost half of the population in traditional ethnic Russian/Cossack regions (left banks of the Terek and Sunzha rivers, cities of Grozny and Gudermes) the catalyst was set for the mass ethnic cleansing of the Russian population that took place in the 1990s. Today Russians make up a tiny minority in both Chechnya and Ingushetia.

== See also ==
- History of Chechnya
- List of leaders of Communist Chechnya
  - Checheno-Ingush Regional Committee of the Communist Party of the Soviet Union
