= Naursky District =

Naursky District Наурский район (Russian)
- District

Other transcription(s)
  - Chechen: Невран кӀошт
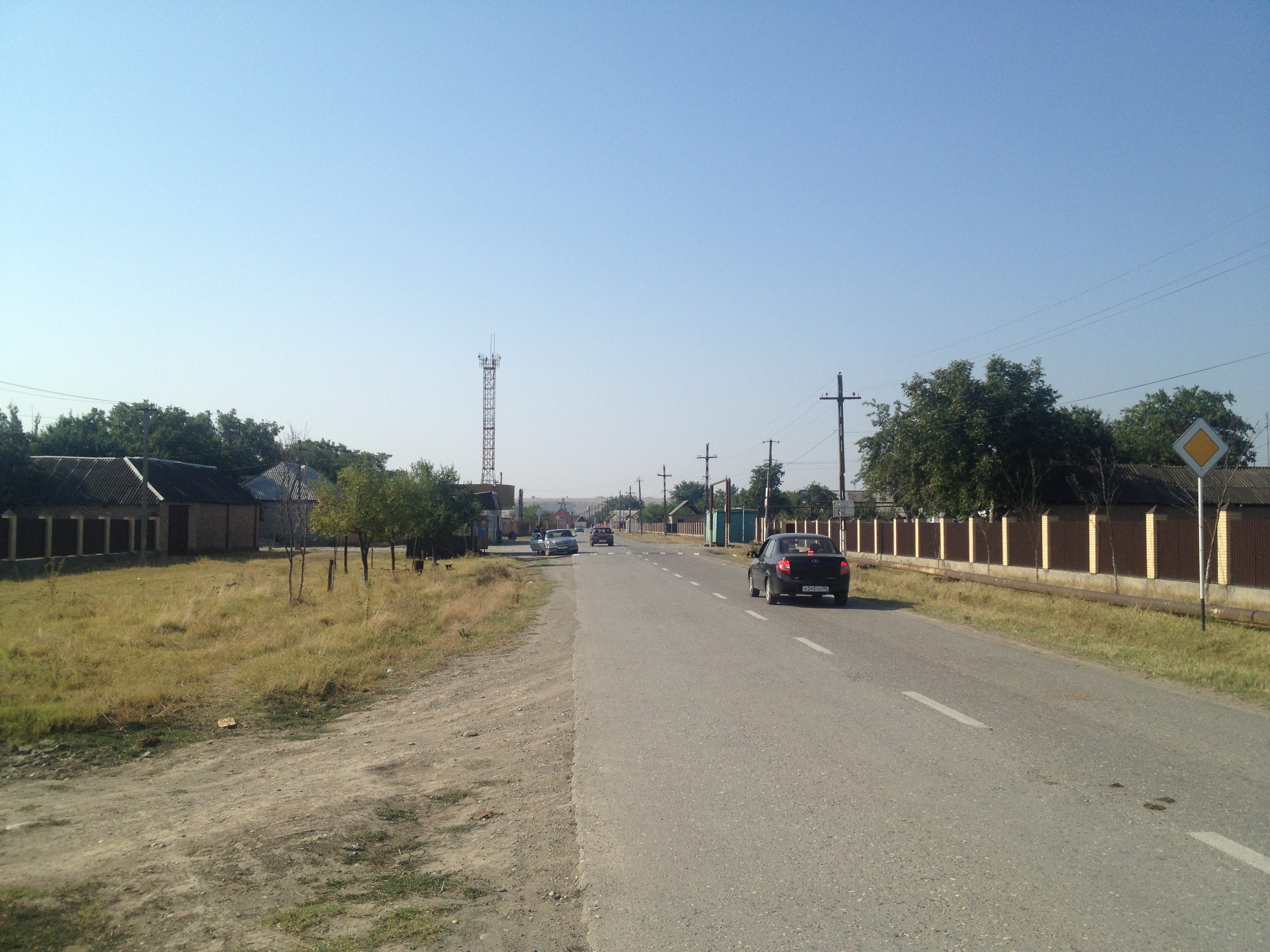
- Entering village in Naursky District

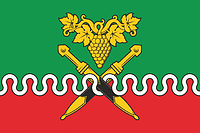
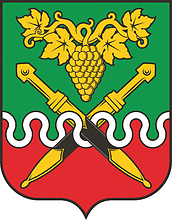
- Flag Coat of arms
- Location of Naursky District in the Chechen Republic
- Coordinates: 43°39′00″N 45°18′33″E
- Country: Russia
- Federal subject: Chechen Republic
- Established: 1935
- Administrative center: Naurskaya

Area
  - Total: 2,225 km^{2} (859 sq mi)

Population (2010 Census)
  - Total: 54,752
  - Density: 24.61/km^{2} (63.73/sq mi)
  - Urban: 0%
  - Rural: 100%

Administrative structure
  - Administrative divisions: 14 rural administration
  - Inhabited localities: 29 rural localities

Municipal structure
  - Municipally incorporated as: Naursky Municipal District
  - Municipal divisions: 0 urban settlements, 14 rural settlements
- Time zone: UTC+3 (MSK)
- OKTMO ID: 96622000
- Website: http://www.chechnya.gov.ru/page.php?republic&id=9

Naursky District (Russian: Нау́рский райо́н; Chechen: Невран кӀошт, Nevran khoşt) is an administrative and municipal district (raion), one of the fifteen in the Chechen Republic, Russia. It is located in the northwest of the republic. The area of the district is 2,225 square kilometers (859 sq mi). Its administrative center is the rural locality (a stanitsa) of Naurskaya. Population: 54,752 (2010 census); 51,143 (2002 Census); 46,360 (1989 Soviet census). The population of Naurskaya accounts for 16.5% of the district's total population.

== History ==
In the second half of the 18th century, the area was settled by the Russian and Ukrainian Cossacks. Several stanitsas were founded. In 1771, after being wounded at the siege of Bender, the future Cossack insurgency leader Yemelyan Pugachev came to live at Ishcherskaya with his family.

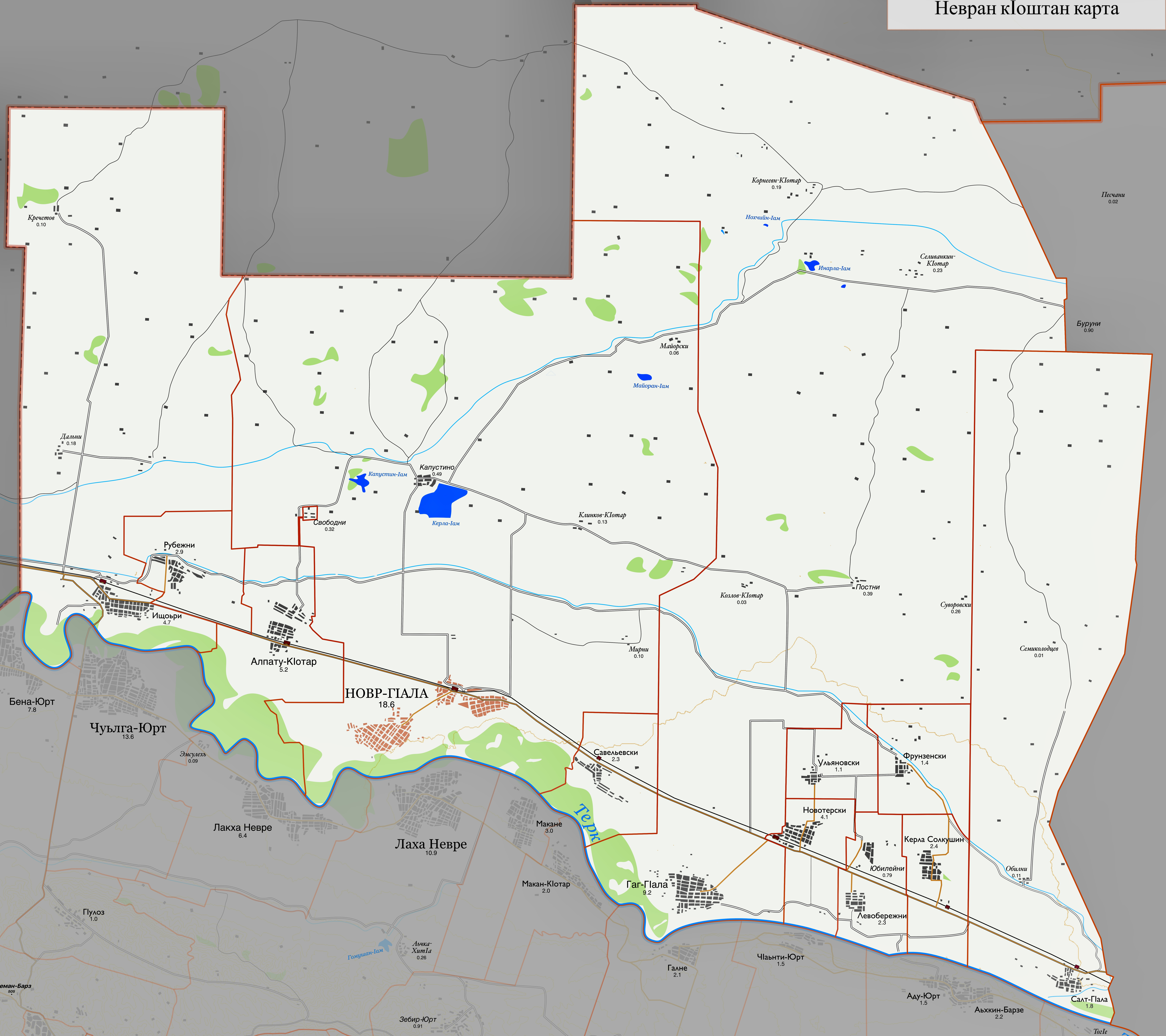
Map of the Naursky District (in Chechen)

The modern district was created in 1935 by the order of the Supreme Soviet. It was a part of Stavropol Krai prior to 1944 when it was transferred to newly created Grozny Oblast. After the Chechens were allowed to return in 1957, the district remained a part of the restored Chechen-Ingush ASSR.

== Economy ==
Its agriculture is dominated by livestock breeding, especially in the north of the district (often subject to field erosion, caused by severe climatic circumstances), but there are vineyards in the south.
