= Naurskaya =

Rural locality in Chechnya, Russia

Coordinates: 43°39′03″N 45°18′27″E

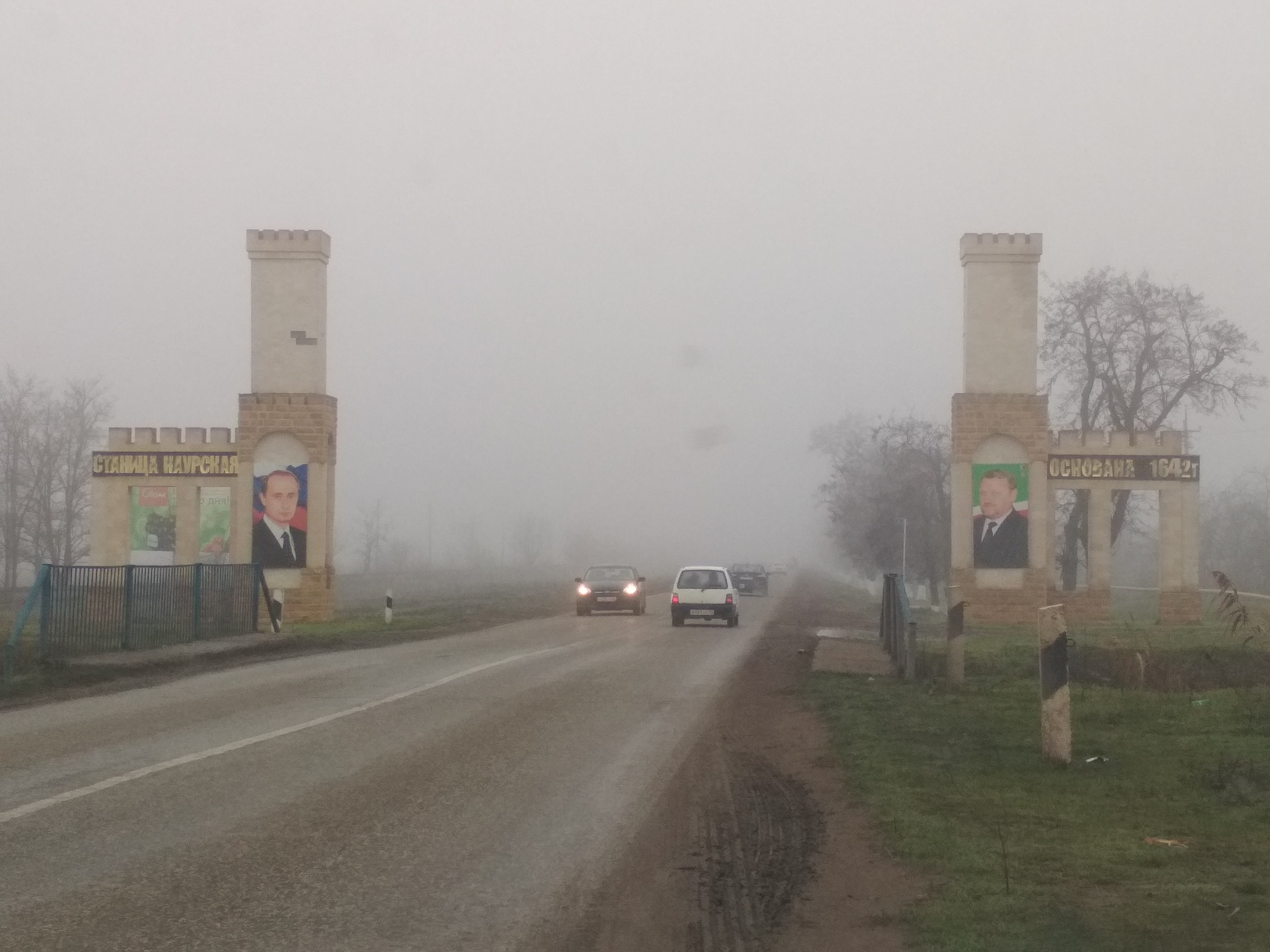
Road in Naurskaya, Naursky District, the Chechen Republic, Russia, December 2017.

Naurskaya (Russian: Наурская, Chechen: Новр-ГӀала, Novr-Ġala) is a rural locality (a stanitsa) and the administrative center of Naursky District, the Chechen Republic, Russia. Population: 9,050 (2010 census); 8,531 (2002 census); 7,617 (1989 Soviet census).

In early 2011, on the site of the old church, destroyed in 1937, construction began in Naurskaya of a new church of the Nativity of Christ, the construction of which was financed by the owner of the "Russian Copper Company" Igor Altushkin. On April 24, 2016, the opening of the temple took place. He was consecrated by Bishop Varlaam of Makhachkala and Grozny on March 4, 2017.
