= History of Chechnya and Ingushetia (1934–1993) =

History of Caucasus regions during Soviet rule

Coordinates: 43.3167°N 45.6833°E

Checheno-Ingush Autonomous Oblast (1934–1936) Checheno-Ingush Autonomous Soviet Socialist Republic (1936–1944, 1957–1990) Checheno-Ingush Soviet Socialist Republic (1990–1992) Checheno-Ingush Republic (1992–1993)
- Autonomous oblast of the Russian SFSR; ASSR of the Russian SFSR; Republic of the Russian Federation
- 1934–1944; 1957–1993
- Flag (1978–1990) Emblem (1978–1992)

- Map of the Checheno-Ingush ASSR

Anthem
- Чечено-Ингушетия Моя "My Checheno-Ingushetia" (1966–1992)
- Capital: Grozny (until 1991); Nazran (de facto, from 1991)
- Demonym: Chechen; Ingush
- Government
  - Motto: Массо а мехкийн пролетарийш, цхьаьнакхета! (Chechen); Масса а мехкашкара пролетареш, вӏашагӏкхета! (Ingush) "Workers of the world, unite!"
- Legislature: Supreme Soviet
- History
  - Unification of the Ingush and Chechen autonomous oblasts; formed the Checheno-Ingush Autonomous Oblast: 15 January 1934
  - Elevation into the Checheno-Ingush Autonomous Soviet Socialist Republic: 5 December 1936
  - Liquidated: 7 March 1944
  - Autonomous Republic restored: 9 January 1957
  - Sovereignty declared, renamed to the Checheno-Ingush Soviet Socialist Republic: 27 November 1990
  - Chechen Revolution: 15 September 1991
  - Declaration of Sovereignty of the Chechen Republic: 1 November 1991
  - Ingush referendum: 30 November 1991
  - Renamed to the Checheno-Ingush Republic: 16 May 1992
  - The Checheno-Ingush Republic divided into Ingush and Chechen republics: 9 January 1993
- Contained within
  - Country: Soviet Union (1934–1991); Russian Federation (1991–1993)
Preceded by
1934: Chechen Autonomous Oblast
Ingush Autonomous Oblast
Succeeded by
1944: Grozny Oblast
Stavropol Krai
North Ossetian ASSR
Dagestan ASSR
Georgian SSR
1991: Chechen Republic of Ichkeria
1992: Ingushetia
- Today part of: Russia · Chechnya · Ingushetia

During the existence of the Soviet Union, different governments ruled the northern Caucasus regions of Chechnya and Ingushetia. Within the Mountain Autonomous Socialist Soviet Republic, later incorporated into the Russian Socialist Federative Soviet Republic, they were known as the Chechen Autonomous Oblast (Note: Russian: Чеченская автономная область, romanized: Chechenskaya avtonomnaya oblast', also known as the Autonomous Oblast of Chechnya, Russian: автономная область Чечни, romanized: avtonomnaya oblast' Chechni) and the Ingush Autonomous Oblast, (Note: Ingush: ГӀалгӀай автономе область, romanized: Ġalġay avtonome oblast', Russian: Ингушская автономная область, romanized: Ingushskaya avtonomnaya oblast') which were unified on 15 January 1934 to form the Checheno-Ingush Autonomous Oblast. (Note: Russian: Чечено-Ингушская автономная област, romanized: Checheno-Ingushskaya avtonomnaya oblast') It was elevated to an autonomous republic as the Checheno-Ingush Autonomous Soviet Socialist Republic (Note: Chechen: Нохч-ГӀалгӀайн Автономнин Советски Социалистически Республика, romanized: Noxç-Ġalġayn Avtonomnin Sovetski Socialistiçeski Respublika; Ingush: Нохч-ГӀалгӀай Автономе Советий Социализма Республика, romanized: Noxç-Ġalġay Avtonome Sovetiy Socializma Respublika; Russian: Чече́но-Ингу́шская Автономная Советская Социалистическая Республика, romanized: Checheno-Ingushskaya Avtonomnaya Sovetskaya Sotsialisticheskaya Respublika) from 1936 to 1944 and again from 1957 to 1993. Its capital was Grozny.

However, because of alleged collaboration with Nazi Germany and the Axis powers during World War II, the autonomous republic was abolished on 7 March 1944, resulting in the ethnic cleansing of the Chechens and Ingush from their territory. The autonomous republic's status was restored in January 1957. The 1979 census reported the territory had an area of 19,300 square kilometres (7,500 sq mi) and a population of 1,155,805 (1979 Census): 611,405 Chechens, 134,744 Ingush, and the rest were Russians and other ethnic groups.

== History ==
=== Russian Empire ===
The region was incorporated into the Russian Empire between 1810 and 1859. In 1810 a treaty facilitated Ingushetia's further integration into Russia. The Ingush needed an alliance with the Russians to protect their villages; at the same time, they hoped to gain political support in opposing the expansion of the Kabardian and Aksai princes. Finally, these agreements contributed to Ingushetia's economic development in the context of expanding capitalist relations. The agreement of 23 August 1810 gave the Ingush the right to use the lands on the right side of the Terek River.

In 1859, historical Chechnya was also annexed by Russia, in the context of the Caucasian War of 1817–64.

=== Soviet period ===
After the Russian Revolution of 1917, on 20 January 1921, Chechnya and Ingushetia joined the Mountain Autonomous Soviet Socialist Republic. The partition of the Mountain ASSR began shortly after it was formed. On the advice of Anastas Mikoyan, the ASSR's Chechen District was separated on 30 November 1922, as the Chechen Autonomous Oblast. The remaining territory of the Mountain ASSR were split into the North Ossetian Autonomous Oblast and the Ingush Autonomous Oblast on 7 July 1924. Later, on 15 January 1934, the Chechen and Ingush Autonomous Oblasts were merged into the Checheno-Ingush Autonomous Oblast, and elevated in status to that of an ASSR (Checheno-Ingush ASSR) on 5 December 1936.

=== World War II ===
During World War II, in 1942–43, the republic was partly occupied by Nazi Germany while 40,000 Chechens fought in the Red Army. On 7 March 1944, on the orders of Stalin, the republic was disbanded and its population forcibly deported following accusations of collaboration with the Axis powers and separatism. The territory of the ASSR was divided between the Stavropol Krai (where the Grozny Oblast was formed), the Dagestan ASSR, the North Ossetian ASSR, and the Georgian SSR where the extra territory was known as the Akhalkhevi District until 1957.

=== Khrushchev Thaw ===
During the Thaw period, Mikoyan advised Nikita Khrushchev on a policy that allowed the deportees and their families to return to Checheno-Ingushetia. On 9 January 1957, the ASSR was officially restored.

=== The collapse of Checheno-Ingushetia ===
On 27 November 1990, the Supreme Soviet of the Checheno-Ingush Autonomous Soviet Socialist Republic adopted a declaration on the state sovereignty of the Checheno-Ingush Republic, and on 24 May 1991, according to the amendments to Art. 71 of the Constitution of the RSFSR, the autonomous republic began to be called the Checheno-Ingush SSR. This decision before the dissolution of the USSR (December 1991) was not consistent with Art. 85 of the Constitution of the USSR, which retained the name of the Checheno-Ingush ASSR.

On 8 June 1991, at the initiative of Dzhokhar Dudaev, delegates of the First Chechen National Congress gathered in Grozny and proclaimed themselves the All-National Congress of the Chechen People (OKChN). Following this, the Chechen Republic (Nokhchi-cho) was declared, and the leaders of the Supreme Soviet of the republic were declared "usurpers".

The events of 19–22 August 1991 in Moscow became the catalyst for a socio-political explosion in Checheno-Ingushetia. The organizer and leader of the mass movement was the executive committee of the OKChN, headed by Dzhokhar Dudaev. After the failure of the GKChP, the executive committee of the OKChN and organizations of the national-radical wing came forward with a demand for the resignation of the Supreme Soviet of the Checheno-Ingush ASSR and the holding of new elections. On 1–2 September, the 3rd session of the OKChN declared the Supreme Soviet of the Autonomous Republic "deposed" and transferred all power in the Chechen part of the republic to the executive committee of the OKChN.

On 6 September 1991, Dudaev announced the dissolution of the republican power structures. Armed supporters of OKChN occupied the building of the TV center and the House of Radio, took by storm the House of Political Education, where the meeting of the Supreme Council was held. On this day, the Supreme Soviet met in full session: heads of local councils, clergy, and heads of enterprises were invited for consultations. Dudaev and other leaders of the OKChN decided to take the building by storm. More than 40 deputies of the Checheno-Ingush parliament were beaten, and the chairman of the Grozny City Council, Vitaly Kutsenko, was thrown out of the window by the separatists, and then finished off in the hospital. Doku Zavgayev resigned from the post of chairman of the Supreme Council of Checheno-Ingushetia under pressure from protesters.

On 15 September, the Chairman of the Supreme Soviet of the RSFSR Ruslan Khasbulatov arrived in Grozny. Under his leadership in the absence of a quorum the last session of the Supreme Soviet of the republic was held, at which the deputies decided to dissolve the parliament. As a result of negotiations between Khasbulatov and the leaders of the executive committee of the OKChN as a temporary authority for the period before the elections (scheduled for 17 November) the Provisional Supreme Council of the Checheno-Ingush ASSR was formed of 32 deputies, reduced shortly to 13 deputies, then up to 9. Dudaev's ally Khusein Akhmadov was elected chairman of the Provisional Supreme Council of Checheno-Ingushetia. Assistant to Khasbulatov Yuri Cherny became the deputy chairman of the council.

By the beginning of October 1991, a conflict arose in the Provisional High Council between supporters of the OKChN (4 members, headed by Khusein Akhmadov) and his opponents (5 members, headed by Yuri Cherny). Akhmadov, on behalf of the entire Council, issued a number of laws and decrees that created the legal basis for the activities of the executive committee of the OKChN as the supreme authority and, on 1 October, announced the division of the Checheno-Ingush Republic into an independent Chechen Republic (Nokhchi-cho) and the Ingush Autonomous Republic within the RSFSR.

On 5 October, 7 out of 9 members of the Provisional Supreme Council made a decision on the resignation of Akhmedov and on the abolition of illegal acts. On the same day, the National Guard of the executive committee of the OKChN seized the building of the House of Trade Unions, in which the Council sat, and also seized the building of the KGB of the Checheno-Ingush ASSR. On 6 October, the executive committee of the OKChN announced the dissolution of the Provisional Supreme Council "for subversive and provocative activities". The Council did not comply with this decision and the very next day made a decision to resume activity in full force (32 deputies). Lawyer Badruddin Bakhmadov was elected as the new chairman.

On 8 October, the Presidium of the Supreme Soviet of the RSFSR declared the Provisional Supreme Soviet to be the only legitimate body of state power on the territory of Checheno-Ingushetia until the election of a new composition of the Supreme Soviet of the republic.

On 27 October 1991, under the control of supporters of the OKChN in the Chechen part of the republic, presidential and parliamentary elections were held for the Chechen Republic (Nokhchi-cho). Dzhokhar Dudaev was elected President of the self-proclaimed republic. The results of the elections were not recognized by the Council of Ministers of Checheno-Ingushetia, heads of enterprises and departments, heads of a number of regions of the autonomous republic. On 2 November 1991, these elections were declared illegal by the Congress of People's Deputies of the RSFSR. The structures of previous power remained for several months after the September coup of . Thus, the Ministry of Internal Affairs and the KGB of Checheno-Ingushetia were abolished only by the end of 1991.

On 7 November, the President of the RSFSR Boris Yeltsin issued a decree declaring a state of emergency in the territory of Checheno-Ingushetia. However, practical measures to implement it failed. Two planes with special forces that had landed at the airfield in Khankala were blocked by Chechen separatists. Leaders of anti-Dudaev parties and movements went over to the side of Chechen separatists. The Provisional Supreme Council of Checheno-Ingushetia and its militia disintegrated in the first days of the crisis. The next day, Chechen guards blocked the buildings of the Ministry of Internal Affairs and the KGB, as well as military camps. Soon after, on 11 November, the Supreme Soviet of the RSFSR refused to approve the decree of President Yeltsin on the introduction of a state of emergency in Checheno-Ingushetia.

30 November – 1 December 1991 in three Ingush regions of Checheno-Ingushetia – Malgobek, Nazran and Sunzhensky – a referendum was held on the creation of the Ingush Republic within the RSFSR. 75% of the Ingush population took part in the referendum, 90% were in favor. As a result of the Chechen Revolution the Checheno-Ingushetia was de facto divided into the Chechen Republic of Ichkeria and Ingushetia, which remained outside the territorial-administrative division. On 16 May 1992, according to the amendment to the Constitution of the RSFSR, the de facto disintegrated Checheno-Ingush SSR received the name Checheno-Ingush Republic. (Note: Chechen: Нохч-ГӀалгӀайн Республика, romanized: Noxç-Ġalġayn Respublika; Ingush: Нохч-ГӀалгӀай Республика, romanized: Noxç-Ġalġay Respublika; Russian: Чече́но-Ингу́шская Республика, romanized: Checheno-Ingushskaya Respublika) On 4 June 1992, the Supreme Soviet of the Russian Federation adopted the Law on the Education of the Ingush Republic. The creation of the republic was submitted for approval by the supreme authority of Russia – the Congress of People's Deputies. On 10 December 1992, the Congress of People's Deputies of Russia approved the formation of the Ingush Republic by its resolution and made a corresponding amendment to the Constitution of the RSFSR 1978, which officially divided the Checheno-Ingush Republic into the Ingush Republic and the Chechen Republic. This amendment was published on 29 December 1992, in the "Rossiyskaya Gazeta" and entered into force on 9 January 1993, after 10 days from the date of official publication.

== Demographics ==
- Vital statistics

Source: Russian Federal State Statistics Service

	Births	Deaths	Birth rate	Death rate
1970	22,651	6,075	21.2	5.7
1975	22,783	6,469	20.4	5.8
1980	24,291	7,711	20.7	6.6
1985	30,745	10,170	25.0	8.3
1990	31,993	11,039	28.2	9.7
1991	31,498	11,081	26.3	9.2
1992	28,875	10,666	23.1	8.5

- Ethnic groups

	1926 census^{1}	1939 census	1959 census	1970 census	1979 census	1989 census	2002 census^{1}
Chechens	295,762 (61.4%)	368,446 (52.9%)	243,974 (34.3%)	508,898 (47.8%)	611,405 (52.9%)	734,501 (57.8%)	1,127,050 (71.7%)
Ingushes	70,084 (14.5%)	83,798 (12.0%)	48,273 (6.8%)	113,675 (10.7%)	134,744 (11.7%)	163,762 (12.9%)	363,971 (23.2%)
Russians	78,196 (16.2%)	201,010 (28.8%)	348,343 (49.0%)	366,959 (34.5%)	336,044 (29.1%)	293,771 (23.1%)	46,204 (2.9%)
Others	38,038 (7.9%)	43,761 (6.3%)	69,834 (9.8%)	74,939 (7.0%)	73,612 (6.4%)	78,395 (6.2%)	33,755 (2.1%)

1. Combined results of Chechnya and Ingushetia

== Maps ==
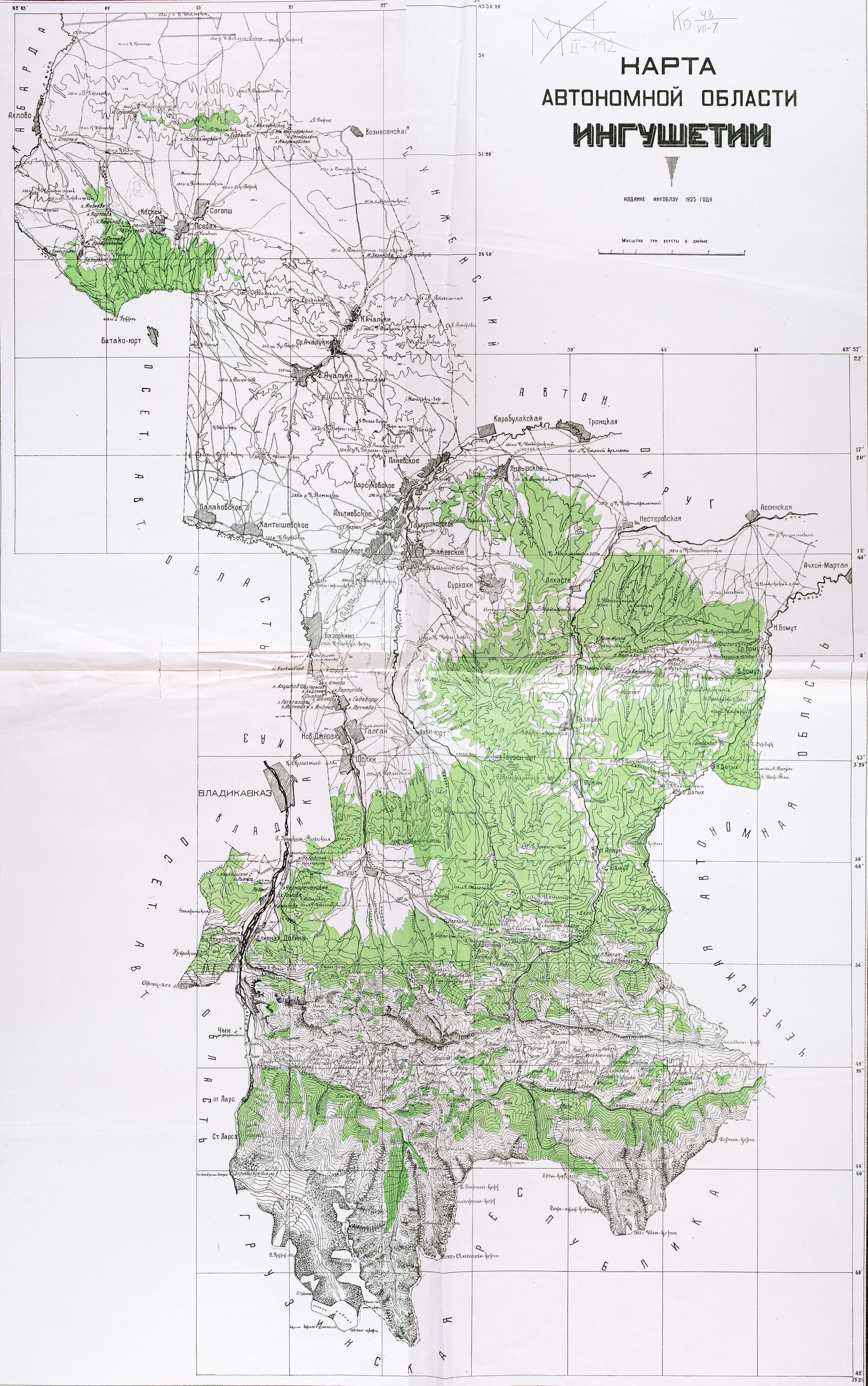
Map of the Ingush Autonomous Oblast

Map of Checheno-Ingush Autonomous Oblast

== See also ==
- History of Chechnya
- History of Ingushetia
- List of leaders of Checheno-Ingushetia
  - Checheno-Ingush Regional Committee of the Communist Party of the Soviet Union
- Ingush nationalism
- Vainakhia

== Bibliography ==
- Генко, А. Н (1930). Из культурного прошлого ингушей (in Russian). Ленинград: Издательство Академии наук СССР. pp. 681–761.
- Shakarian, Pietro A. (2025). Anastas Mikoyan: An Armenian Reformer in Khrushchev's Kremlin. Bloomington: Indiana University Press. ISBN 978-0253073556.
