= Tashla =

Tashla (Russian: Ташла) is the name of several rural localities in Russia:

- Tashla, Republic of Bashkortostan, a village in Tashlinsky Selsoviet of Gafuriysky District of the Republic of Bashkortostan
- Tashla, Tashlinsky District, Orenburg Oblast, a selo in Tashlinsky Selsoviet of Tashlinsky District of Orenburg Oblast
- Tashla, Tyulgansky District, Orenburg Oblast, a selo in Tashlinsky Selsoviet of Tyulgansky District of Orenburg Oblast
- Tashla, Samara Oblast, a selo in Stavropolsky District of Samara Oblast
- Tashla, Stavropol Krai, a khutor in Nadezhdinsky Selsoviet of Shpakovsky District of Stavropol Krai
- Tashla, Ulyanovsk Oblast, a crossing loop in Yasashnotashlinsky Rural Okrug of Terengulsky District of Ulyanovsk Oblast
