= Alu Alkhanov =

2004–2007 President of Chechnya

- Алу Алханов
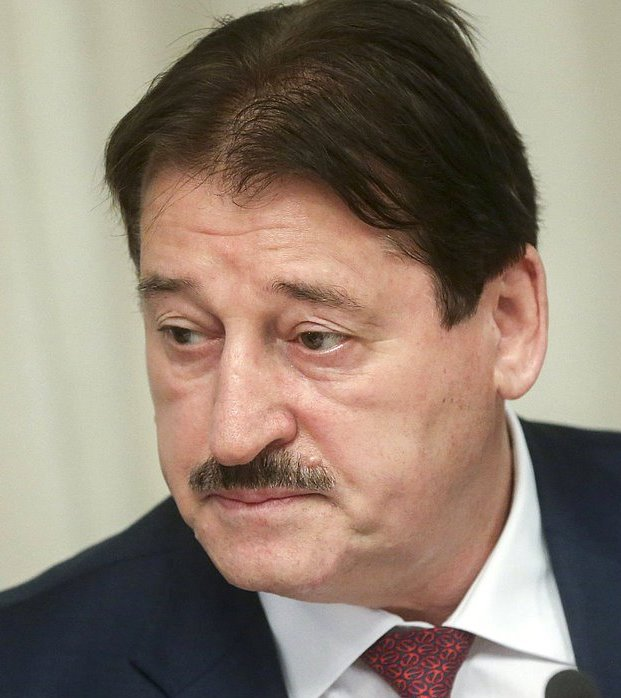
- Alkhanov in 2018

2nd President of the Chechen Republic
- In office 30 August 2004 – 15 February 2007
- Preceded by: Sergey Abramov (acting); Akhmad Kadyrov
- Succeeded by: Ramzan Kadyrov

Personal details
- Born: 20 January 1957 (age 69) Taldykorgan, Kazakh SSR, Soviet Union
- Party: Independent

Alu Dadashevich Alkhanov (Russian: Алу Дадашевич Алханов, born 20 January 1957) is a Russian politician and former police officer who served as the President of the Chechen Republic from 2004 to 2007. A career transport police officer, he sided with the federal government during the First Chechen War and became Chechnya's interior minister under Akhmad Kadyrov in 2003. After Kadyrov's assassination in 2004, he won that year's presidential election as the Kremlin's favoured candidate, in a vote that the US State Department said did not meet international standards. After a two-year rivalry with Prime Minister Ramzan Kadyrov, he resigned in February 2007 and was appointed a Deputy Minister of Justice of Russia.

== Early life and police career ==
Alkhanov was born on 20 January 1957 in the settlement of Kirovsky (now Balpyk Bi) in Taldykorgan, Kazakh SSR. After leaving school, he served in the Soviet Army. In 1983, he graduated from a special secondary school for the transport militsiya in Mogilev, and he later graduated with honours from the Rostov Higher School of the Militia. He holds a Candidate of Sciences degree in law.

He sided with Moscow in 1991. From 1992 to 1997, he served as deputy head and then head of the Grozny linear department of internal affairs, part of the North Caucasus transport police directorate. During the First Chechen War, he fought against the forces of Dzhokhar Dudayev. In August 1996, during the separatist assault on Grozny, he led the defence of the city's railway station and remained there until federal forces gave up the city. After the war, he moved to Rostov Oblast, where he headed the linear department of internal affairs in Shakhty. He returned to Grozny in 2000, during the Second Chechen War, and again took charge of the city's transport police.

== Interior minister ==
On 16 April 2003, President Vladimir Putin signed a decree appointing Alkhanov Minister of Internal Affairs of Chechnya, after Akhmad Kadyrov, the head of the Chechen administration, put him forward as one of four candidates. At the time, he held the rank of militia colonel and headed Grozny's main directorate for internal affairs in transport. He took up his duties on 18 April 2003, and Taus Dzhabrailov, a deputy head of the Chechen administration, described him as a career police officer with operational experience and combat training. He was promoted to major general of the militia in 2003.

== 2004 presidential election ==
=== Candidacy ===
After Akhmad Kadyrov was killed in a bomb blast at a parade celebrating the 59th anniversary of VE Day in Grozny in May 2004, an early presidential election was called for 29 August. Alkhanov agreed to run after meeting Putin on 15 June, and Kremlin polls gave him 45.1 percent against 25.3 percent for his main rival, the Moscow-based businessman Malik Saidullayev. He was registered as a candidate on 15 July. Radio Free Europe/Radio Liberty (RFE/RL) described him as the clear Kremlin favourite, while noting that he lacked Kadyrov's charisma. Some analysts saw him as a counterweight to Kadyrov's son Ramzan Kadyrov, while others expected him to serve only as an interim leader until Ramzan Kadyrov turned 30 in October 2006. During the campaign, Alkhanov headed a new Public Council, which allowed him to campaign unofficially.

On 22 July, the Chechen election commission refused to register Saidullayev, citing incorrect passport data and information about depositors to his fund, and his supporters called the decision a provocation. RFE/RL noted that Alkhanov's own passport gave his first name as Ali rather than Alu, but that this misprint was overlooked. The International Helsinki Federation for Human Rights and the Moscow Helsinki Group said that the reasons given for Saidullayev's exclusion seemed baseless, described the contest as a "one-horse race" and urged Russia to postpone the election.

Seven of almost 20 would-be candidates were registered. Besides Alkhanov, they were:

- Umar Abuyev, director general of the Chechenneftekhimprom federal unitary enterprise
- Magomed Aidamirov, director general of the company Nedr
- Mukhmud-Khasan Asakov, a chief specialist for administrative affairs at the State Council of Chechnya
- Abdula Bugayev, director of the Goryacheistochnenskaya office of the Modern Humanities Academy
- Vakha Visayev, an adviser to the President of Chechnya
- Movsar Khamidov, a colonel in the Federal Security Service and a former deputy prime minister of Chechnya

The Institute for War and Peace Reporting described three of the minor candidates as "torpedoes" whose campaign statements helped Alkhanov.

=== Results ===
The election was held on 29 August 2004. Abdul-Kerim Arsakhanov, the head of the Chechen election commission, announced that Alkhanov had received 321,271 votes, or 73.78 percent, and called him the "absolute leader" of the poll. In the final official tally, Alkhanov received about 74 percent and Khamidov about 9 percent, on an official turnout of 85 percent. Alkhanov said that he felt "an enormous burden of responsibility". International observers came from the Commonwealth of Independent States, the Arab League and the Organization of the Islamic Conference, while the Council of Europe and the OSCE did not send observers.

=== Criticism ===
The election of his predecessor in the 2003 Chechen presidential election had also drawn criticism, with the Moscow Helsinki Group saying that the 2003 result had been made possible by "major fraud and falsification of results". After the 2004 vote, the US State Department spokesman Richard Boucher said that it did not meet international standards for a democratic election, citing "serious flaws in the electoral process", especially the disqualification of a leading candidate over a minor technicality. Andreas Gross, a Council of Europe representative in Grozny, called the vote "undemocratic", and Chechen separatists denounced it as a farce.

Observers questioned the high official turnout, as many polling stations appeared empty, and Usam Baysayev of the human rights group Memorial said that "in reality there had been no presidential election in Chechnya". A Kommersant reporter said that he had cast ballots at four polling stations without any obstacles. Khamidov and Bugayev alleged irregularities, and Khamidov's campaign said that it had found ballot boxes already filled when polls opened, as well as fake ballot papers.

== Presidency ==
Alkhanov (right) with President of Russia Vladimir Putin (center) and Mayor of Moscow Yuri Luzhkov (2004)

Alkhanov was inaugurated on 5 October 2004 in Grozny, at a ceremony held under tight security and attended by about 500 guests, and he took the oath in both Russian and Chechen. In his speech, he invoked Akhmad Kadyrov and called for unity against "terrorism and banditry", saying, "Only together can we beat our common enemy". He pledged to unify and rebuild Chechnya and to bring stability to the republic. Sergey Abramov, who had served as acting president, was expected to remain prime minister, with Ramzan Kadyrov as first deputy prime minister.

Shortly after the election, Alkhanov ruled out talks with the separatist leader Aslan Maskhadov and said that he would sweep Chechnya's separatist extremists into the "dustbin of history". Before his inauguration, he indicated that he might hold talks with Maskhadov if Maskhadov publicly renounced separatist goals.

In March 2006, after the People's Assembly of Chechnya approved Ramzan Kadyrov as prime minister, Alkhanov signed a decree ratifying the appointment and said that "for the first time in the history of the Chechen republic, all of its highest-ranking officials are residents of Chechnya".

=== Rivalry with Ramzan Kadyrov ===
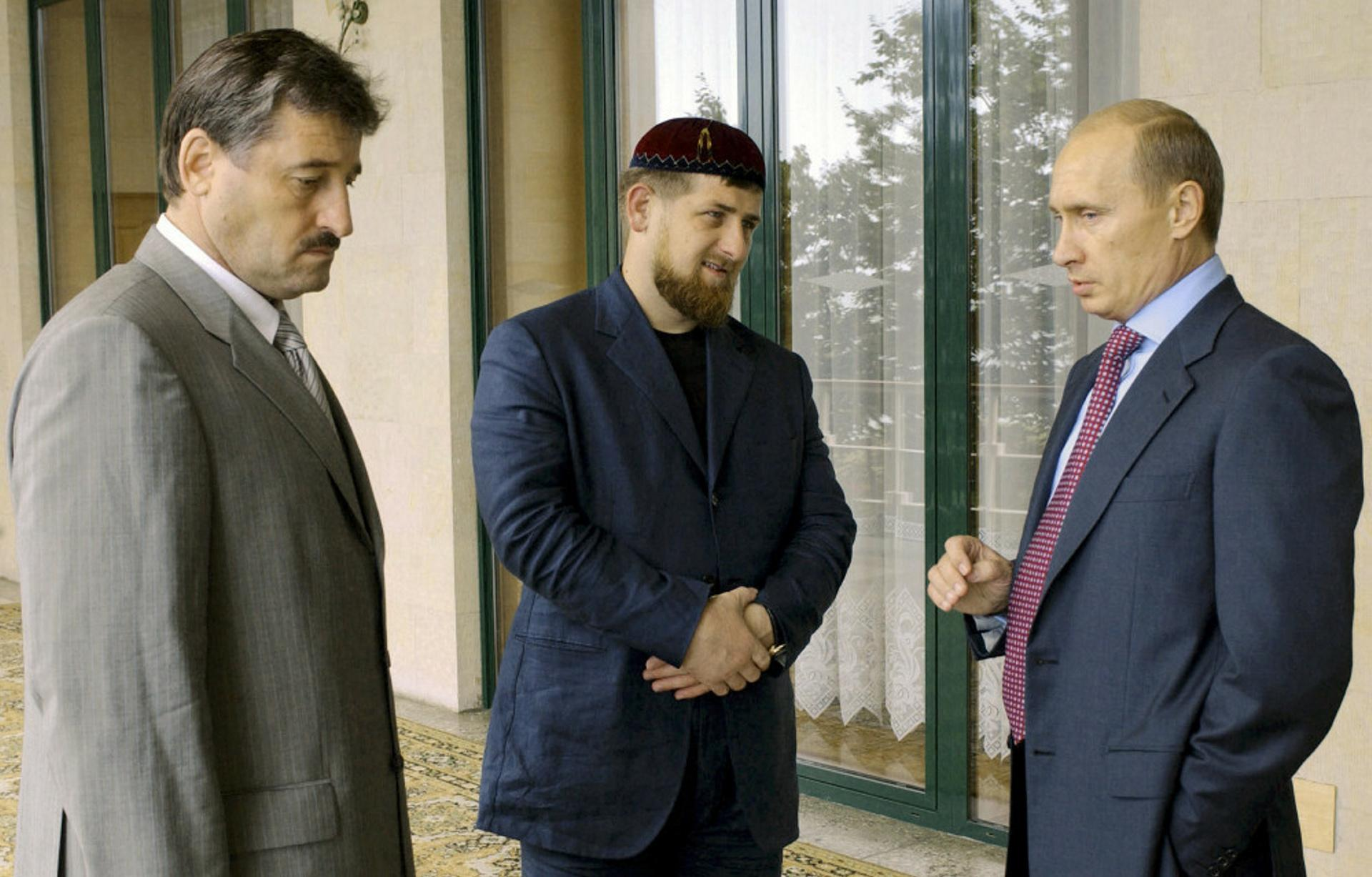
Alkhanov with Ramzan Kadyrov (center) and Vladimir Putin (2004)

Alkhanov's relationship with Ramzan Kadyrov developed into a two-year rivalry, and analysts had long viewed Kadyrov as his likely successor. The International Crisis Group later wrote that although Alkhanov held the presidency, "Ramzan was the actual boss". Officials loyal to Kadyrov reportedly restricted Alkhanov's access to local media and destroyed the print run of a Chechen newspaper that had planned to mark his 50th birthday in January 2007.

On 25 January 2007, Alkhanov said that he did not plan to seek a second term in 2008, while the presidential envoy Dmitry Kozak said that the Kremlin had no plans to replace him. At a meeting with representatives of federal agencies on 12 February, Alkhanov criticised "totalitarian methods of governing" in what RFE/RL described as a veiled reference to Kadyrov, and said, "The cult of personality and idealization of a single person will not bring any benefit to our republic and society". His ally German Vok, the secretary of the Chechen Security Council, argued that Kadyrov should have resigned before publicly criticising Alkhanov. Alkhanov denied rumours that he would resign, saying that whether he stayed in office was up to "the Almighty and the president of our country".

=== Resignation ===
Late on 15 February 2007, Alkhanov submitted his resignation, and Putin accepted it. Alkhanov had asked to be transferred to other work, and Putin appointed him a Deputy Minister of Justice of the Russian Federation and named Ramzan Kadyrov acting president. Voice of America described the move as a dismissal. Putin awarded Alkhanov the Order of Merit for the Fatherland, 4th class, and told him that "a lot has improved in Chechnya" during his tenure. Alkhanov said that he had followed Akhmad Kadyrov's course of consolidating society and reviving the republic, and that he was sure this course would continue. The Crisis Group later wrote that Alkhanov resigned and moved to Moscow when Kadyrov turned 30.

== Later career ==
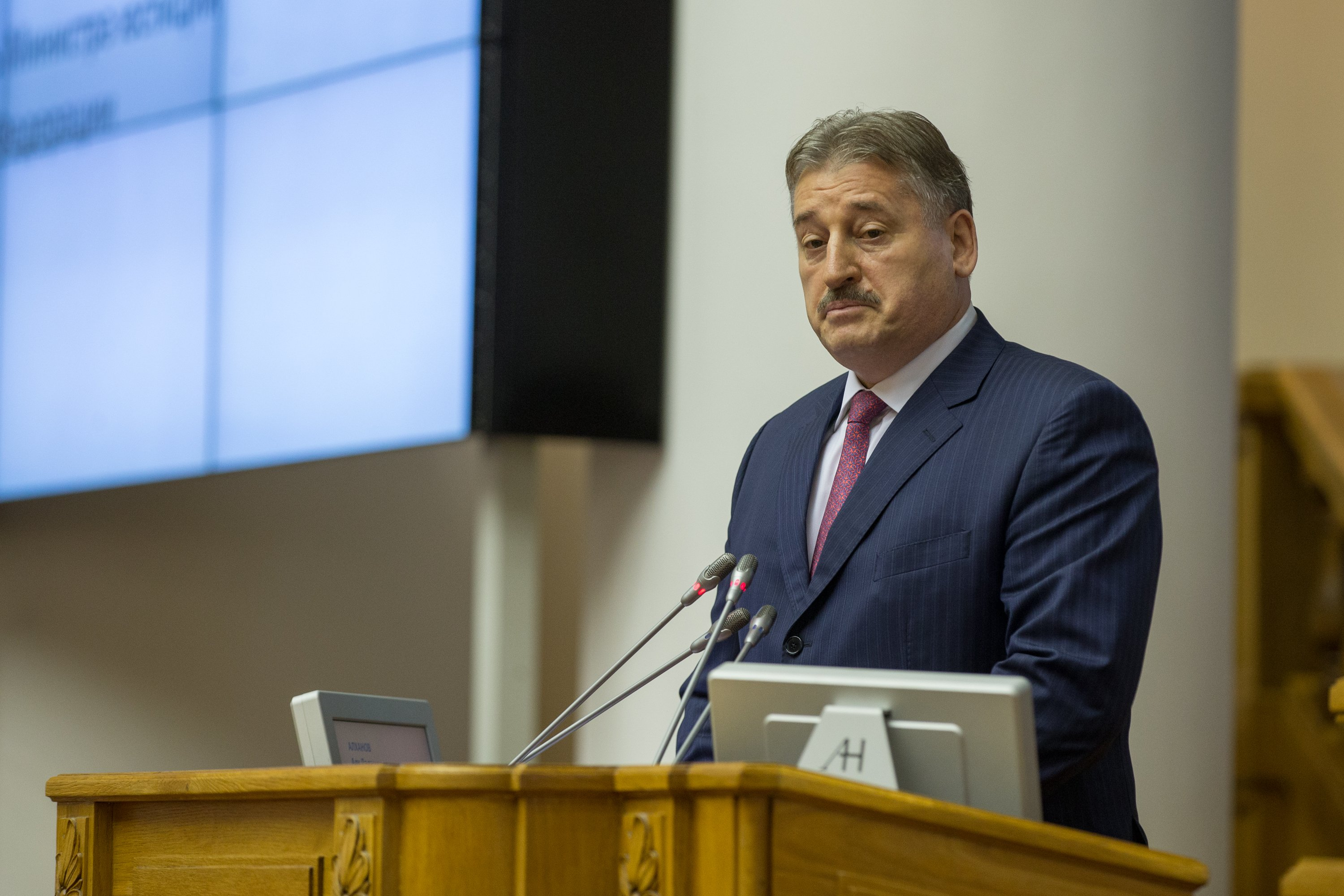
Alkhanov speaking at the meeting of the Federation Council (2016)

Alkhanov became a Deputy Minister of Justice of Russia in February 2007. In March 2010, he took over responsibility for overseeing the prison system from Yury Kalinin, whom the Kremlin had dismissed, and told Kommersant that he would continue the reforms the ministry had begun after the death of the lawyer Sergei Magnitsky in pretrial detention. In January 2024, Putin extended his term in the federal civil service until 20 January 2025, beyond the usual age limit of 65. In April 2025, as deputy justice minister, he met Artyom Zhoga, the presidential envoy to the Ural Federal District, in Yekaterinburg to discuss the oversight of foreign agents. He holds the class rank of Active State Councillor of Justice, 1st class, and is a retired lieutenant general of police.

== Personal life ==
Alkhanov is married and has three children. He is also referred to as Ali Alkhanov in official Russian sources.

== Honours and awards ==
- Order of Merit for the Fatherland, 3rd class
- Order of Merit for the Fatherland, 4th class (15 February 2007)
- Order of Alexander Nevsky
- Order of Courage
- Order of Honour
- Medal "For Distinction in the Protection of Public Order"
- Certificate of Honour of the President of the Russian Federation

== See also ==
- Ramzan Kadyrov
- Federal government in Chechnya
- Second Chechen War

Political offices
| Preceded by Akhmad Kadyrov | President of the Chechen Republic; 2005–2007 | Succeeded by Ramzan Kadyrov |
