= Alexander Timashev =

Russian general and statesman

Alexander Egorovich Timashev
- Александр Егорович Тимашев
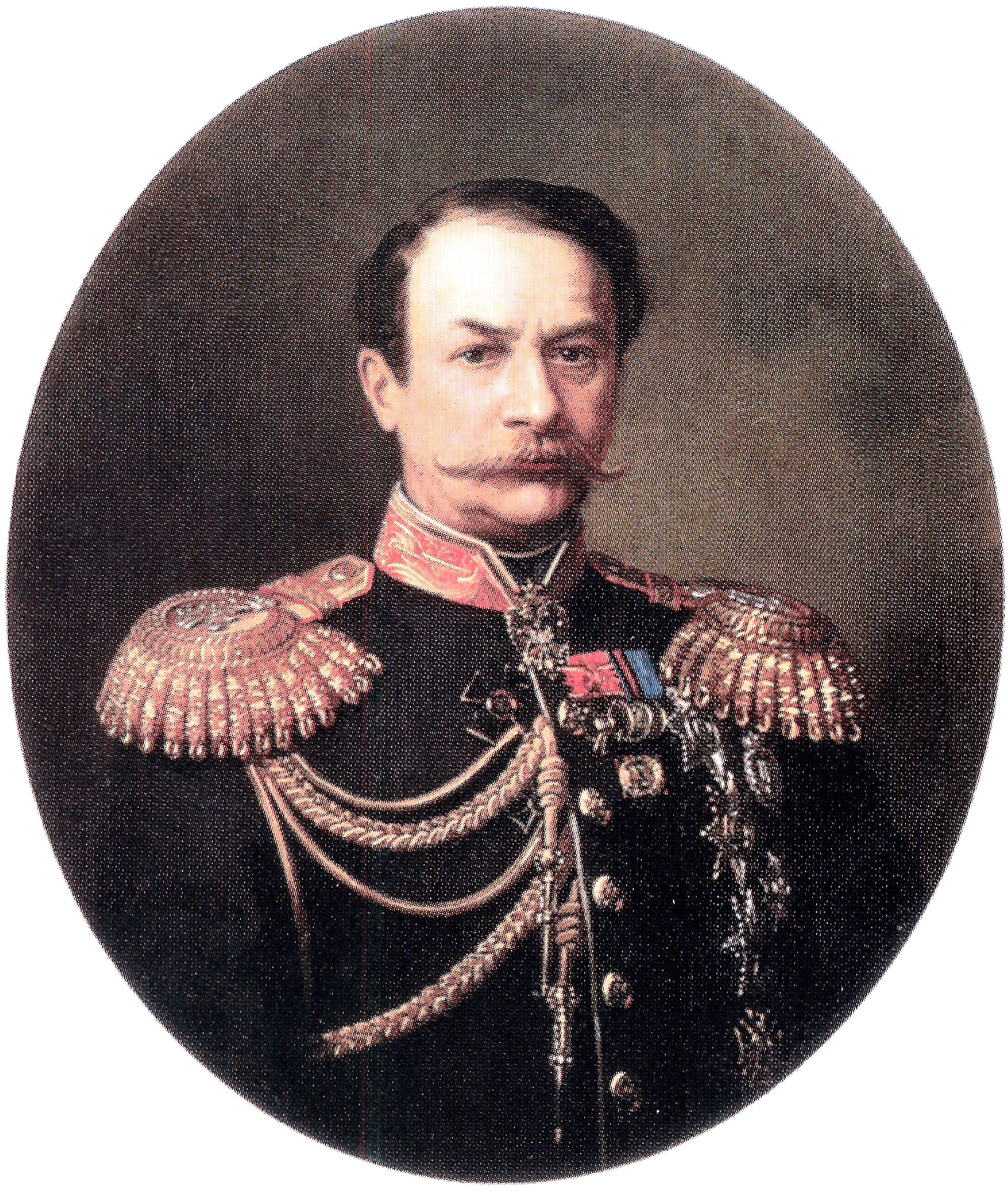
- Timashev in 1873. Portrait by Ivan Tyurin

Minister of Internal Affairs of the Russian Empire
- In office 9 March 1868 – 27 November 1878
- Preceded by: Peter Valuev
- Succeeded by: Lev Makov

Minister of Posts and Telegraphs of the Russian Empire
- In office 14 December 1867 – 9 March 1868
- Preceded by: Ivan Tolstoy
- Succeeded by: Office abolished

Personal details
- Born: 15 April 1818 Tashla, Ilek District, Orenburg Governorate
- Died: 1 February 1893 (aged 74) Saint Petersburg
- Relations: Timashevs
- Education: Moscow University Noble Boarding School
- Awards: Domestic: Orders: Order of the Holy Apostle Andrew the First–Called; Order of Saint Vladimir; Order of Saint Alexander Nevsky; Order of the White Eagle; Order of Saint Anna; Order of Saint Stanislaus; Medals: Medal "For the Pacification of Hungary and Transylvania"; Medal "In Memory of the War of 1853–1856"; Medal "In Memory of the Consecration of the Cathedral of Christ the Savior"; Medal "In Commemoration of the Coronation of Emperor Alexander III"; Foreign: Orders: Austrian Order of Leopold; Order of the Red Eagle; Order of the Sword; Order of Saints Maurice and Lazarus; Order of the Dannebrog; Order of Leopold I; Legion of Honour; Order of the Lion and the Sun

Military service
- Years of service: 1835–1893
- Rank: Adjutant General; General of the Cavalry

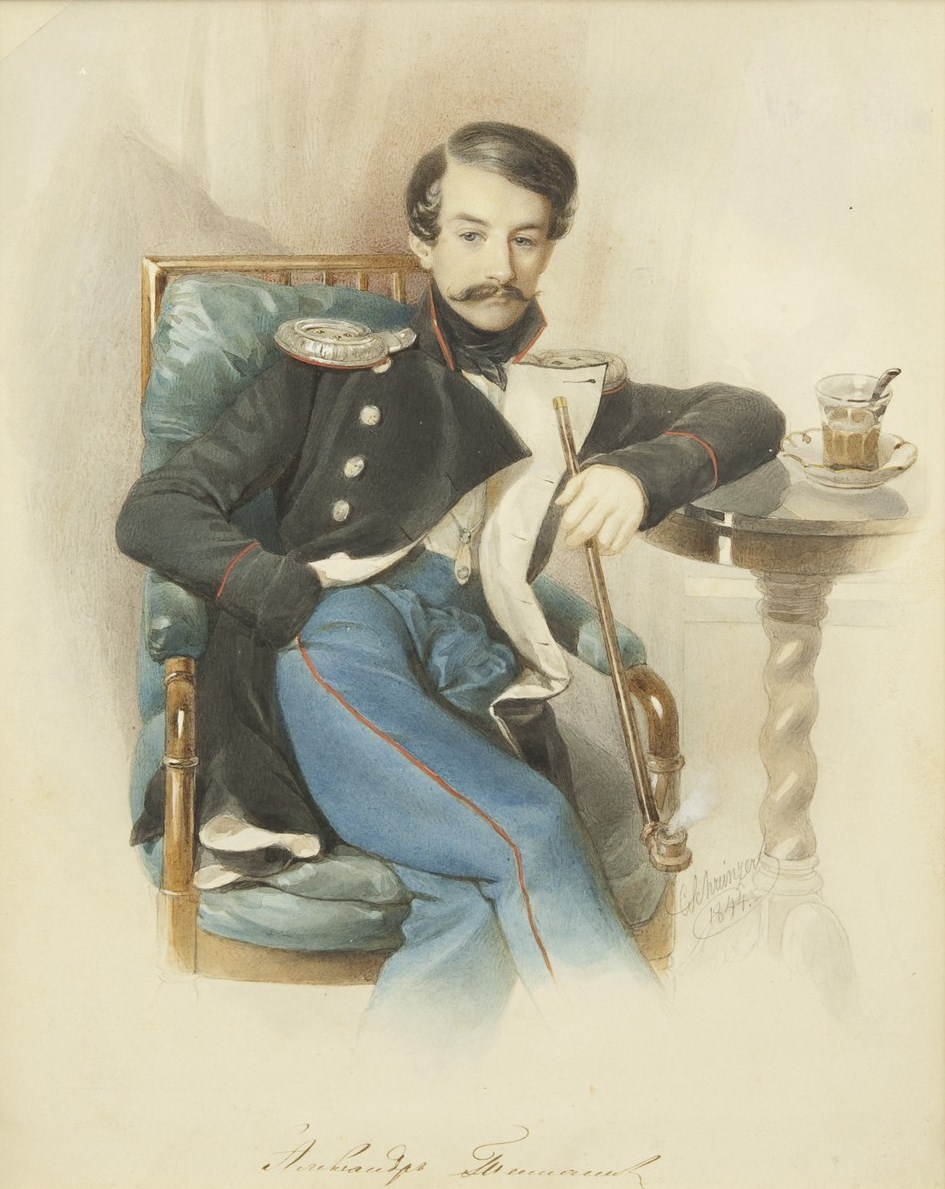
Timashev in 1844. Drawing by Schreinzer

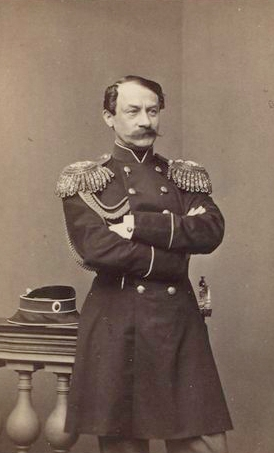
Adjutant General Timashev

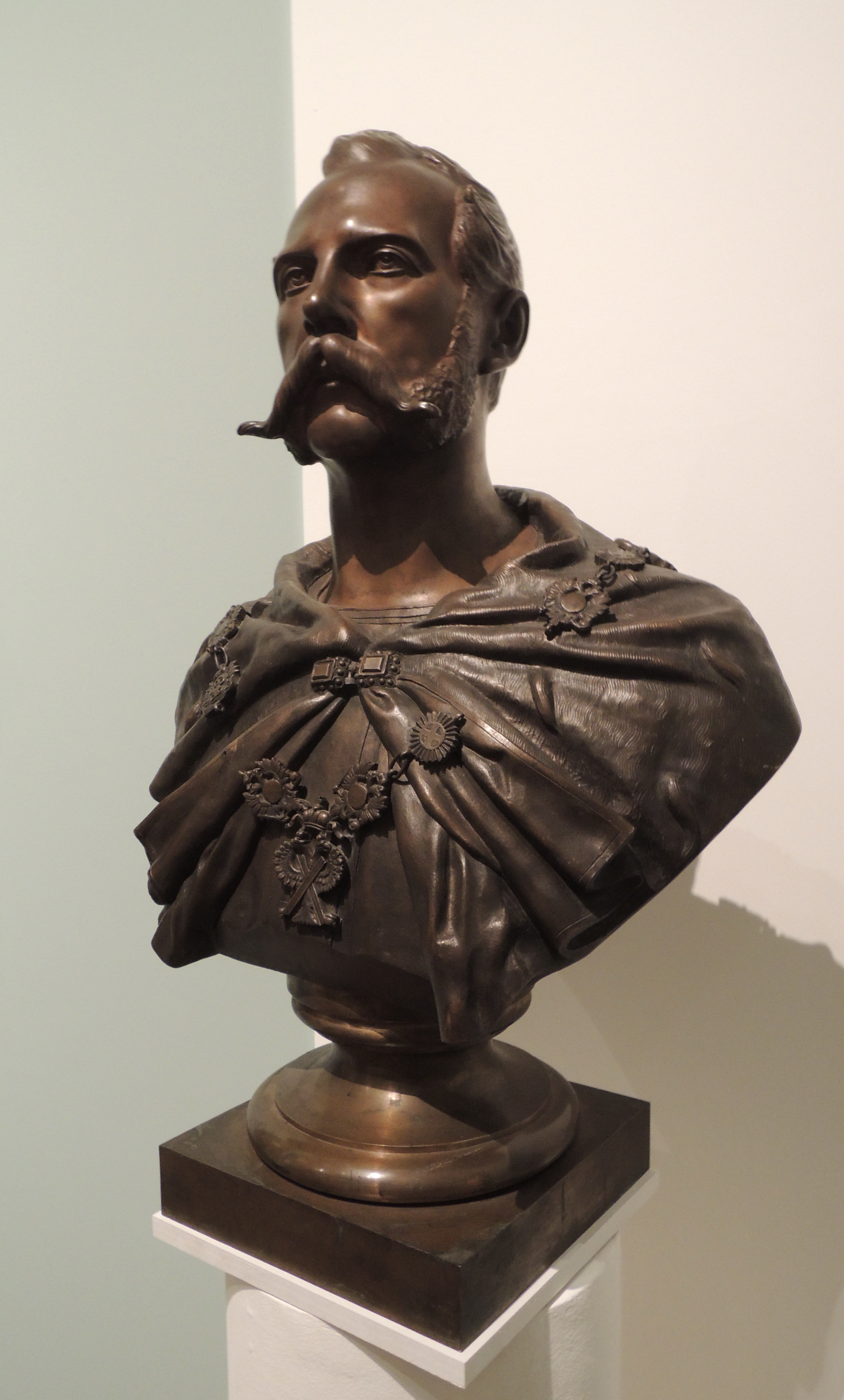
Bust of Alexander II by Alexander Timashev

Alexander Yegorovich Timashev (15 April 1818 – 1 February 1893) was a Russian statesman. He served as Adjutant General (1859), Cavalry General (1872); Chief of Staff of the Gendarme Corps and Manager of the Third Section of His Imperial Majesty's Own Chancellery (1856–1861); Minister of Posts and Telegraphs (1867–1868); and Minister of Internal Affairs of the Russian Empire (1868–1878).

== Biography ==
Alexander Timashev came from an old noble family. Born 3 April 1818, in the Orenburg Province, where at that time his father served and owned the estate. The son of Major General Yegor Timashev and his wife Ekaterina Alexandrovna, née Zagryazhskaya.

Educated at the Noble Boarding School at the Imperial Moscow University and at the School of Guards Ensigns and Cavalry Junkers.

On 27 September 1835, he was released from the School and enlisted as a non–commissioned officer in the Izmailovsky Life Guards Regiment, and a year later, on 3 December 1836, he was promoted to sub–ensign. On 1 September 1837, he received his first officer rank – ensign, on 12 September of the same year, he was transferred to the Life Guards Grenadier Regiment.

On 29 April 1840, he was transferred to the Cavalry Guard Regiment and renamed into cornet. On 21 April 1842, he was promoted to lieutenant.

On 19 February 1844, Timashev was sent to the Separate Caucasian Corps, where he arrived in April. On 17–18 September of the same year, he took part in his first battle with the highlanders, for which he was awarded the Order of Saint Anne of the 3rd Degree With a Bow. Having received the rank of adjutant wing on 6 December 1844, in January 1845, he returned to Saint Petersburg. On 21 April 1845, he was promoted to staff captain, and on 1 July 1848, to captain.

During these years, with the rank of adjutant wing, he was regularly sent around the empire to carry out various assignments, such as monitoring the progress of recruits, conducting investigations in case of incidents, examining troops affected by the cholera epidemic, and others. He also accompanied Emperor Nicholas I on numerous trips around Russia.

On 18 June 1849, he was sent to the detachment of Lieutenant General Grotengelm, who participated in the campaign in Transylvania against the rebellious Hungarians. Arriving at the detachment, on 26–27 June, he took part in the battle near the village of Koshno, the attack on Bystritsa and in the pursuit of the Hungarians to Seredfilvo. On 3 July, he participated in the battle at Galati, on 9 July – in the capture of the town of Safhegan and the pursuit of the enemy to the village of Sharonberk, and on 24 July, commanding two squadrons of the Elisavetgrad Uhlan Regiment, defeated the enemy rear guard near the village of Shariot.

On 7 August 1849, Timashev was promoted to colonel, and on 10 August he was sent to Shabo, where he accepted the surrender of a 15–thousandth detachment of Hungarians. On 12 August, he left Hungary and went to Warsaw, where Nicholas I was at that time.

On 6 December 1850, Colonel Timashev was appointed to the correcting position of Chief of Staff of the 3rd Reserve Cavalry Corps, with whom he took part in the campaign of 1854–1855 after the start of the Crimean War. On 29 August 1855, he was appointed correcting the post of Chief of Staff of the 3rd Army Corps, which fought in the Crimea. On 13 September, he was confirmed in office.

On 22 September 1855, he was promoted to major general with an appointment to the Retinue of His Majesty, with the retention of his post. On 16 February 1856, Timashev was instructed to hold a meeting at the Stone Bridge across the Black River with representatives of the Anglo–French troops to agree on the final terms of the armistice and determine the demarcation line.

On 11 May 1856, he was dismissed from the post of Chief of Staff of the 3rd Army Corps, and on 26 August of the same year, he was appointed Chief of Staff of the Gendarme Corps and Manager of the 3rd Department of His Imperial Majesty's Own Chancellery. On 24 September 1856, he was also appointed a member of the General Directorate of Censorship, and on 20 December 1858, a member of the Committee of Railways.

On 17 April 1859, he was awarded the rank of Adjutant General. From 10 September 1859, he temporarily served the duties of the Chief of Gendarmes and the Chief of the 3rd Department. Not getting along with his immediate superior, the Chief of the Gendarmes, Prince Vasily Dolgorukov, finding him too liberal, and also not agreeing with the basic principles of peasant reform, Timashev submitted a petition to relieve him of his post. On 18 March 1861, he was dismissed on indefinite leave.

On 29 May 1863, he was appointed interim Governor–General of Kazan, Perm and Vyatka. On 30 August of the same year, he was promoted to lieutenant general. On 19 October 1864, he was dismissed from his post of Governor–General, due to its abolition.

On 28 February 1865, Timashev received permission to leave "to Russia and abroad, until the illness was cured", with the preservation of his salary. Due to poor health, he left for the south of France, where he was engaged in sculpture and photography.

After the death of Count Ivan Tolstoy, on 12 December 1867, Timashev received the post of Minister of Posts and Telegraphs, but already on 9 March 1868, the ministry was abolished, with the inclusion of its departments in the Ministry of Internal Affairs, and Timashev was appointed Minister of Internal Affairs, instead of Peter Valuev.

On 12 June 1870, he was appointed Chairman of the Committee on Provincial and Uyezd Institutions, on 1 January 1872, he was promoted to General From the Cavalry, on 30 April 1872, he was appointed a member of the Committee for the Affairs of the Kingdom of Poland, in 1876 – Chairman of the Committee on the Application of the City Regulation of 1870 in the Baltic Cities Provinces.

During Timashev's tenure as Minister of Internal Affairs, a city regulation was introduced in 1870, the transformation of peasant institutions in 1874 was made, the postal part was improved to a large extent, some General Governorships were abolished, the provinces of the Kingdom of Poland were subordinated to the Ministry of Internal Affairs, and the introduction of the Russian language in the Baltic provinces as an official and business language has begun. He was an opponent of bourgeois transformations, one of the active organizers of the struggle against the revolutionary and terrorist movement.

On 27 November 1878, he was dismissed from the post of Minister of the Interior, leaving him in the Suite and being appointed a member of the State Council, in which he was a member of the committee on prison reform.

In May 1883, he took part in the coronation ceremony of Emperor Alexander III and Empress Maria Feodorovna. On 15 May, during the Imperial exit to the Assumption Cathedral, he, together with Count Login Heyden, carried the Empress's purple. On the same day, he was enlisted in the lists of Her Majesty's Cavalry Regiment with the right to wear the regimental uniform.

On 15 February 1885, he was appointed a member of the Special Committee to develop a draft regulation on the special advantages of the civil service in the distant parts of the empire.

He died on 20 January 1893, in Saint Petersburg, was buried at the Nikolskoe Cemetery of the Alexander Nevsky Lavra (according to other sources, in the Tashla Family Estate in the Orenburg Province).

According to the recollections of contemporaries, "a beautiful appearance, with a significant fortune, which multiplied after his marriage to Pashkova, skillfully dancing and possessing the talent for drawing caricatures, Timashev soon acquired great success and made a successful career".

Timashev was fond of sculpting equestrian figurines and busts. Among his works are busts of Grand Duke Mikhail Pavlovich and Emperor Alexander II, figures of Empresses Alexandra Feodorovna and Maria Feodorovna. Timashev's works were exhibited at academic exhibitions. In 1869, he was elected an honorary member of the Academy of Arts, and in 1889, he was awarded the title of academician of sculpture for the bust of Alexander II and statuettes made of terracotta and marble.

== Awards and honorary titles ==
During his service, Adjutant General Timashev was awarded numerous awards.

=== Russian ===
- Order of Saint Anna, 3rd Class With Bow (20 October 1844)
- Perfect Imperial Pleasure (5 August 1847)
- Order of Saint Anna, 2nd Class With the Imperial Crown (22 August 1849)
- Snuffbox With Diamonds and the Emperor's Monogram (13 December 1849)
- Medal "For the Suppression of Hungary and Transylvania" (1850)
- Highest Gratitude (17 September 1852)
- Order of Saint Vladimir, 3rd Class (17 September 1852)
- Supreme Grace (28 February 1854)
- Highest Gratitude (31 March 1855, bequest of Nicholas I)
- Insignia of Immaculate Service for 15 Years (22 August 1855)
- Order of Saint Stanislaus, 1st Degree (26 August 1856)
- Medal "In Memory of the War of 1853–1856" (1856)
- Order of Saint Anna, 1st Class (With Swords Over the Order; 30 August 1857)
- Highest Graces (26 September and 4 October 1857)
- Order of Saint Vladimir, 2nd Class (23 April 1861)
- Order of the White Eagle (30 August 1864)
- Insignia for the Land Arrangement of State Peasants (10 March 1869)
- Order of Saint Alexander Nevsky (20 April 1869)
- Badge of Distinction for Work on the Land Arrangement of the Villagers of the Bessarabian Region (7 July 1872)
- Diamond Signs to the Order of Saint Alexander Nevsky (13 April 1875)
- Highest Gratitude (19 June 1875)
- Order of Saint Vladimir, 1st Class (27 November 1878)
- Gold Medal "In Memory of the Consecration of the Cathedral of Christ the Savior" (1883)
- Medal "In Commemoration of the Coronation of Emperor Alexander III" (1883)
- Order of the Holy Apostle Andrew the First–Called (29 December 1887)
- Insignia of Immaculate Service for XL Years (23 August 1889)

=== Foreign ===
- Austrian Order of Leopold, 2nd Degree (1849)
- Swedish Order of the Sword, Grand Cross (1868)
- Danish Order of the Dannebrog, Grand Cross (1869)
- Belgian Order of Leopold I, 1st Degree (1872)
- Prussian Order of the Red Eagle, Grand Cross (1873)
- French Order of the Legion of Honour, Grand Cross (1873)
- Persian Order of the Lion and the Sun, 1st Degree (1873)
- Austrian Order of Leopold, 1st Degree (1874)
- Italian Order of Saints Maurice and Lazarus, Grand Cross (1874)

Timashev was elected and approved an honorary citizen of the cities: Kazan (13 August 1864), Vyazma (3 January 1869), Kharkov (30 May 1869), Skopin (26 December 1869), Belgorod (10 April 1870), Orenburg (26 July 1870) Kaluga (25 December 1870), Petrozavodsk (19 June 1871), Saratov (29 October 1871), Nizhny Novgorod (9 August 1873), Tambov (9 August 1873), Gzhatsk (8 March 1874), Rybinsk (12 April 1874), Odessa (12 April 1874), Novgorod (14 June 1874), Kamyshin (22 May 1875), Rostov (25 July 1875), Yekaterinoslav (9 January 1876), Penza (25 January 1876), Saransk (25 January 1876), Smolensk (1878).

On 27 February 1873, he was elected an honorary member of the Pskov Ioanno–Ilyinsky Community of Sisters of Mercy, on 29 June 1873 – an honorary member of the Society of Zealots of Orthodoxy and Charity in the Northwest Territory, and on 25 November 1878 – an honorary member of the Imperial Society of Agriculture of Southern Russia.

== Family ==
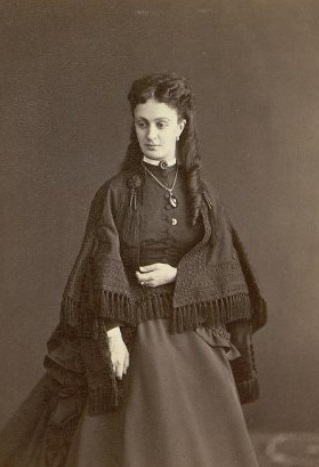
Ekaterina Timasheva

Wife (from 10 November 1848) – Ekaterina Pashkova (2 October 1829 – 15 October 1899), maid of honor of the court, daughter of Major General Alexander Pashkov (1792–1868) from a marriage with Elizaveta Kindyakova (1805–1854). According to Mikhail Osorgin, Madame Pashkov "was, if not a beauty in the full sense of the word, then, in any case, a very prominent, attractive person, and, as they said, was the subject of platonic adoration of her cousin Nikolai Mezentsev's entire life". She was "a sweet and gentle creature; she was engaged in children and housekeeping", wrote Alexandra Smirnova about her. For the merits of her husband, on 28 March 1871, she was awarded a knightly lady of the Order of Saint Catherine (Lesser Cross). She was buried in the church fence of the village of Tashla, Orenburg Province, in the family crypt. Born in marriage:

- Nikolai (1849–1877), was single;
- Alexander (1857–1904), Orenburg Provincial Leader of the Nobility, equestrian;
- Maria (1857–1943), married to the Cavalry Guard Ivan Musin–Pushkin;
- Elizabeth (born 17 October 1861, Paris), goddaughter of Vasily Pashkov.

== Poem by Alexey Tolstoy ==
Alexander Timashev was the hero of the satirical poem by Alexey Tolstoy "History of the Russian State from Gostomysl to Timashev", written in the year of his appointment as Minister of Internal Affairs (1868). The humorously exaggerated figure of the minister, as presented by Tolstoy, crowns the thousand–year–old Russian history and finally brings the "order" that was absent in Russia all this time, about which the narrator narrates in the "chronicle syllable":

Seeing that everything is worse
Things are going badly for us,
Very pretty husband
The Lord has sent us.

For our consolation
Us, like the light of dawn,
Showed his face Timashev –
To put things in order.

== Remembrance ==
On 30 October 2019, a bust of Alexander Timashev was installed opposite the building of the Office of the Ministry of Internal Affairs in Orenburg in Orenburg Region.

== Sources ==
- Pyotr Dolgorukov. Petersburg Sketches. Emigrant Pamphlets. 1860–1867 / Pyotr Dolgorukov; Executive Editor Nikolay Chulkov – Moscow: Yurayt, 2019 – pp. 71–75 – (Anthology of Thought) – ISBN 978-5-534-09349-0
- Ministry of the Interior. 1802–1902. Historical Sketch – Saint Petersburg, 1902 – pp. 108–109
- Collection of Biographies of Cavalry Guards. 1826–1908: On the Occasion of the Centenary of the Her Majesty's Cavalry Guards Regiment, Empress Maria Feodorovna / Edited by Sergei Panchulidzev – Saint Petersburg, 1908 – Volume 4 – pp. 134–135
- Timashev, Alexander Egorovich // Brockhaus and Efron Encyclopedic Dictionary: In 86 Volumes (82 Volumes and 4 Additional) – Saint Petersburg, 1890–1907
- Denis Shilov. Statesmen of the Russian Empire. 1802–1917: Bibliographic Reference – Edition 2 – Saint Petersburg, 2002 – pp. 724–727
