= 2004 Grozny stadium bombing =

Fatal attack in Chechnya, Russia

- Part of the Second Chechen War
- Location: Grozny, Chechnya, Russia
- Date: 9 May 2004
- Deaths: 10
- Injuries: 100

The 2004 Grozny stadium bombing occurred on 9 May 2004 when a bomb exploded in the Dynamo Stadium in the Chechen capital, Grozny, killing 10 people including the republic's president Akhmad Kadyrov. Another 100 people were wounded.

== Background ==
The attack occurred during a parade and concert celebrating the 59th anniversary of the defeat of Nazi Germany in the Second World War.

== Bombing ==
The explosion was caused by a bomb planted underneath the concrete floor of the VIP podium and occurred at 10:35 am during a cultural presentation that followed the parade. The blast tore a hole in the section designated for dignitaries. Other fatalities of the attack included Khussein Isayev (Chairman of the State Council), and Adlan Khasanov (a reporter for Reuters). Colonel General Valery Baranov, the de facto commander of the Russian Army in the northern Caucasus, lost a leg in the attack. Although estimates of total casualties varied, at least ten people were killed and around a hundred more injured, including many civilians and war veterans who were attending the celebrations. The blast was detonated by remote control and was installed below the VIP section where Kadyrov was sitting. It was supposedly planted some time before, during the recent renovations to the venue. The type of explosive was identical to one used to blow up a similar parade two years prior in the Dagestani city of Kaspiysk. Two other blasts were prevented as emergency services defused a landmine and an additional explosive device. On 12 May, another explosive device was found in the stadium.

== Investigation ==
Initial investigations focused on the security staff at the stadium and the builders who took part in the renovations. Investigators had given a more specific list of suspects who were under investigation to the State Duma.

== Reactions ==
Rebel leader Shamil Basayev claimed that he was involved in and had organized the blast. The attack may have been intended to sow panic and disorder among the pro-Russian Chechen leadership. The Russian-appointed Prime Minister Sergey Abramov served as president until new elections were held sometime before September, as stipulated by the republic's constitution. Another man was later arrested and cooperated with the investigators in providing useful information.

== Legacy ==
The Victory Day holiday has subsequently also served as a day of remembrance for the victims of the attack. On 9 May, the entire leadership of the republic visit the grave of the president in Tsentoroy and pray there. This takes place prior to a Victory Day parade on a square named in Kadyrov's honor.

== See also ==
- 2002 Grozny truck bombing
