= Zhirnov =

Zhirnov (Russian: Жирнов) is the name of several inhabited localities in Russia.

Urban localities

- Zhirnov, Rostov Oblast, a settlement under the administrative jurisdiction of Zhirnovskoye Rural Settlement in Tatsinsky District of Rostov Oblast

Rural localities

- Zhirnov, Orenburg Oblast, a settlement in Stepnoy Selsoviet of Tashlinsky District of Orenburg Oblast
