= Valery Baranov =

Valery Baranov may refer to:

- Valery Baranov (politician) (1957–2023), Ukrainian politician
- Valery Baranov (soldier) (born 1948), Russian soldier
