= Love Time (restaurant) =

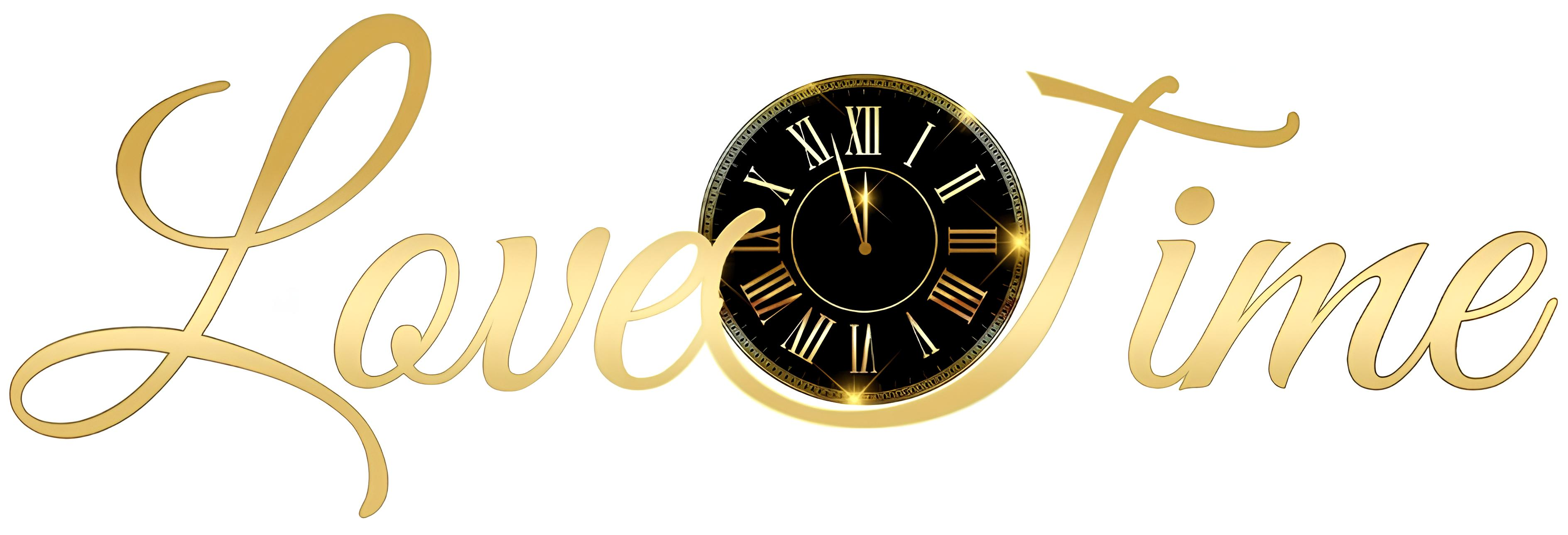

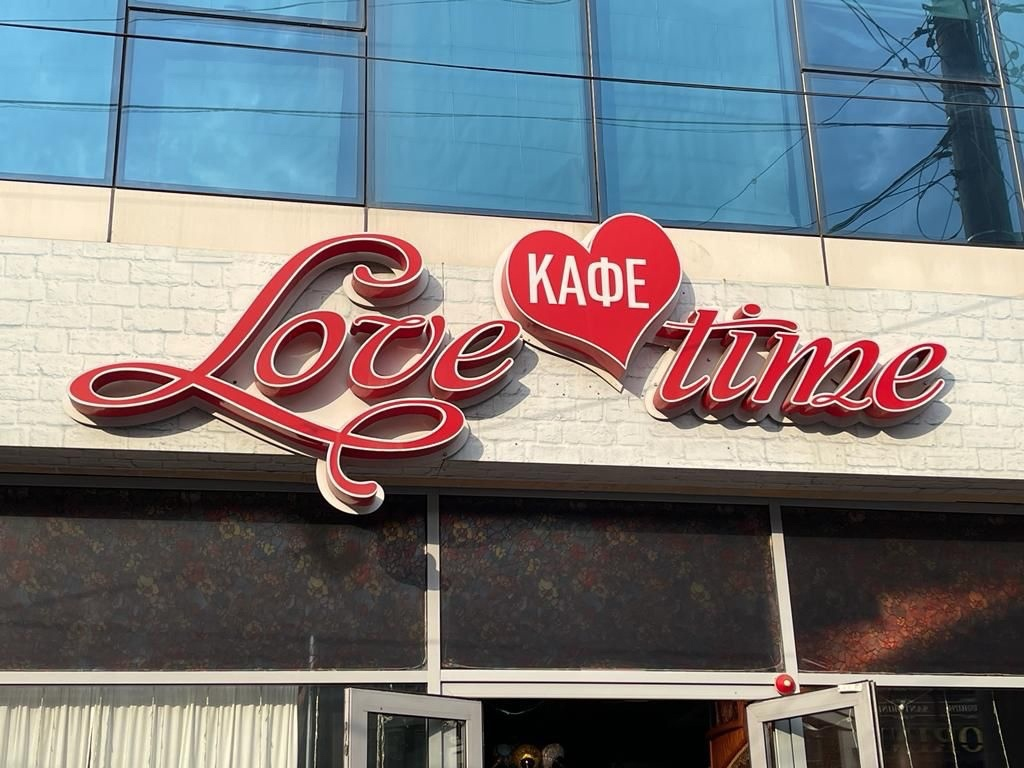

Restaurant information
- Established: October 2009
- Owners: Renat Shabanov and Miasat Shabanova
- Chef: Rafidin Ramazanov
- Location: Korkmasova street, 63, Mahachkala, Russia
- Website: Instagram

Love Time — a Russian catering restaurant located in the capital of Republic of Dagestan, Makhachkala. Combines Russian, European, Caucasian and Asian cuisines.

In 2020, the restaurant was included in the Russian Book of Records for the largest cake in Russia made of rolled sushi.

== History ==
The restaurant was first opened in October 2009 in Makhachkala at 28, Yaragsky Street in the GUM shopping center.

On October 1, 2017, the restaurant moved to a new building in the same area at Korkmasova street, 63.

In 2018, he won in the nomination "Restaurant of the Year" of the project "Person of the Year".

In 2020, the restaurant was included in the "Book of Records of Russia" for making the largest cake made of rolled sushi in Russia. In the near future, it is planned to open a new restaurant at 126, Kadyrov Street. The restaurant will be made in Dagestan folk style. The creation of a three-tiered cake took 250 kg of rice, 190 kg of chicken fillet, 10 kg of mayonnaise, as well as batter, crackers and nori leaves. The height of the cake was 90 cm, and the diameter of the lower tier was 1.5 meters.

"The largest tower of sushi rolls" records was set on June 6, 2021. Caesar Tempura rolls were used to make the record tower. Eight chefs of a local restaurant participated in its preparation. About six hours were spent on the event.

In 2021 and 2022, short feature films directed by students and debutants of Moscow film schools were regularly filmed on the basis of the restaurant.

"Love Time" received a tender for the service of the Chairman of the Federation Council of Russia Valentina Matvienko during her two-day working visit to Dagestan.

== Cuisine ==
The restaurant has dishes from various countries of the world on its menu. There is European, Asian, Japanese, Caucasian cuisine.

== Charity ==
The head of the restaurant M.A. Shabanova regularly transfers part of the profits to the charity foundation "Pure Heart", founded in Makhachkala.
