= Adlan Khasanov =

Russian journalist and photographer

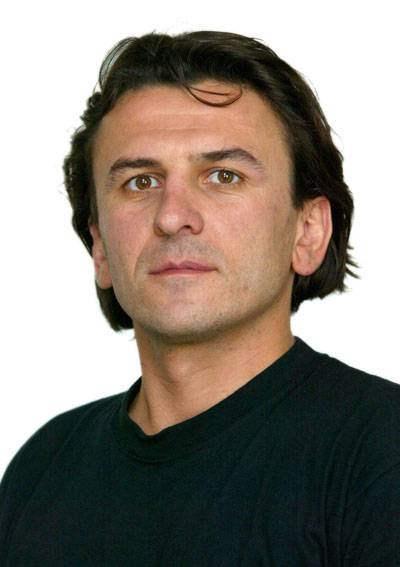
- Born: 25 May 1970; Chechnya
- Died: 9 May 2004 (aged 33); Grozny
- Occupation: Photojournalism

Adlan Khasanov (Russian: Адлан Хасанов 25 May 1970 – 9 May 2004) was a Russian Chechen journalist and photographer, killed in action in Grozny.

== Career and death ==
Khasanov studied journalism at the Chechen State University, and later worked in newspapers as a reporter and photographer. He also worked for Reuters and Radio Liberty.

He was killed during a 9 May Victory Day parade at the "Dynamo" stadium in Grozny, in a bomb blast carried out by Chechen separatists in an attempt to eliminate Kremlin-backed Chechen President Akhmad Kadyrov. The stadium had undergone remodeling and reconstruction, and, according to reports, a bomb placed inside a concrete part of the structure escaped security detection sweeps.

== See also ==
- List of journalists killed in Russia
