= Yakov Bulgakov =

Russian diplomat (1743–1809)

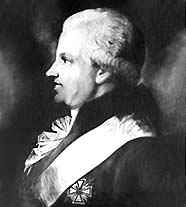
- Education: Imperial Moscow University (1763)
- Partner: Catherine Amber (during 1780–1797)
- Children: three, including Alexander and Konstantin

Yakov Ivanovich Bulgakov (Russian: Я́ков Ива́нович Булга́ков; 15 October 1743 – 7 July 1809) was a Russian diplomat best remembered as Catherine II's emissary in Constantinople in the 1780s.

Bulgakov belonged to a noble parentage and attended the gymnasium of the newly founded Moscow University. His class fellows included Ippolit Bogdanovich, Denis Fonvizin, and Grigory Potemkin. Bulgakov was sent to notify Augustus III about the demise of Empress Elizabeth. A year later, he was dispatched to Vienna to inform Maria Theresa of Austria about the coup d'état that brought Catherine II to the throne.

Together with his patron, Prince Nicholas Repnin, Bulgakov was active in Warsaw, where he served as a secretary at the Russian mission. After the Treaty of Küçük Kaynarca, he accompanied Repnin to Constantinople, where they persuaded the Sultan to acknowledge the independence of Crimea. In 1777 Repnin and Bulgakov proceeded to the Congress of Teschen, which concluded the War of the Bavarian Succession. Four years later, Bulgakov went to Ukraine, charged with the task of delineating the new border with Poland.

On 20 May 1781, the Empress appointed Bulgakov her emissary at the Sublime Porte. His mission was to prepare and smooth the Russian annexation of Crimea. A free trade agreement, concluded between the powers in 1783, was his notable success. When the last Crimean khan submitted to Catherine's authority, there were fears that the Russian resident would be mobbed and lynched. However, Bulgakov did not allow himself to be entrapped by the intrigues of the French ambassador and, on 28 December, wrested from Sultan a grudging recognition of the occupation of Crimea, which effectively precluded a new war between the countries.

When Catherine visited Novorossiya in 1787, Bulgakov went to confer with her in Crimea. Upon his return to Constantinople, he was thrown into the dungeon of the Castle of Seven Towers, where he translated French authors and wrote letters to his monarch. The Russo-Turkish War (1787–92) erupted, but Bulgakov still managed to be useful to the Russian government, so much so that he succeeded in obtaining a plan of the Turkish naval offensive, drafted by the French ambassador Comte de Choiseul-Gouffier. Contrary to recommendations of British, Swedish and Prussian diplomacy, the Sultan found it prudent to set "the obnoxious Russian" free (24 November 1789) and to deport him from his dominions.

Bulgakov declined to be transported to Russia on a French frigate, instead sailing to Trieste, from where he travelled to Vienna, where he met the dying Joseph II. Passing through Iași (where Potemkin was negotiating a peace treaty with the Sultan), Bulgakov arrived to St. Petersburg. The Empress commended his service and awarded him with extensive estates in newly acquired Belarus. Thereupon he was dispatched as minister plenipotentiary to Warsaw, where he spent four years orchestrating the Polish–Russian War of 1792.

Following Catherine's death, Bulgakov administrated the governorates of Vilno and Grodno until 1799, when he finally retired on account of bad health. He was elected into the Russian Academy in 1795. The remainder of his life was spent in retirement in Moscow.

== See also ==
- Pyotr Andreyevich Tolstoy, Peter I's emissary in Constantinople
- Ivan Neplyuyev, Anna I's emissary in Constantinople
