= 2003 Chechen presidential election =

- 5 October 2003
- Turnout: 87.70%
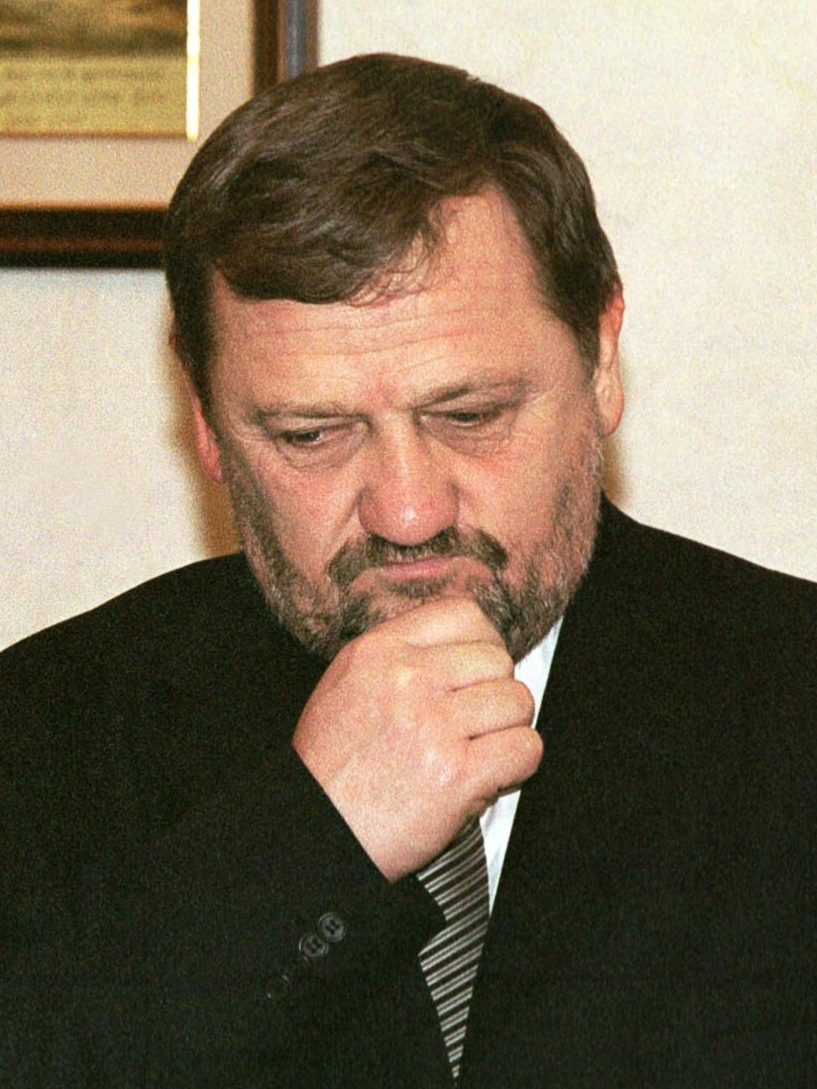

Candidate	Akhmad Kadyrov	Abdulla Bugayev
Party	Independent	Independent
Popular vote	403,490	28,823
Percentage	84.12%	6.01%
President before election
Akhmad Kadyrov
Independent
Elected President
Akhmad Kadyrov
Independent

Presidential elections were held in the disputed Russian republic of Chechnya on 5 October 2003, amidst the Second Chechen War. Held six months after a three-part constitutional referendum, the election was reported as a success for Russian-backed candidate Akhmad Kadyrov, who reportedly won with 84% of the vote and 88% turnout.

Early candidates in the election besides Kadyrov included Aslambek Aslakhanov, Malik Saidullaev, and Umar Dzhabrailov. However, by the time of the election any significant candidates besides Kadyrov had dropped out. The election was marked by a lack of violent incidents, though among the incidents that did occur was a skirmish in Grozny and a mine clearing operation in Samashki. The election was boycotted by international monitors such as the Organization for Security and Co-operation in Europe and the Parliamentary Assembly of the Council of Europe, who argued that a free and fair election was impossible under Chechnya's conditions. Representatives of the Moscow Helsinki Group, Arab League, Organisation of the Islamic Conference, and the Commonwealth of Independent States assessed the vote, and Moscow Helsinki Group head Lyudmila Alexeyeva described the vote as free and fair, though she criticised the conditions of the vote as causing voters to fear retaliation for their votes. Despite claims by the Russian government to the contrary, several polling stations were reported as being empty by independent media.

In addition to residents of Chechnya, Russian soldiers and Chechen refugees in the neighbouring republic of Ingushetia were permitted to vote.

Few commentators within Chechen or Russian media spheres expected any significant change to emerge from the election, according to Reuters. The government of the breakaway Chechen Republic of Ichkeria rejected the results, with representative Akhmed Zakayev saying that "Mr Kadyrov is, and will continue to be, an appointed head of the regime."

== Results ==
Candidate	Votes	%
Akhmad Kadyrov	403,490	84.12
Abdulla Bugayev	28,823	6.01
Shamil Burayev	19,694	4.11
Kudus Saduyev	7,667	1.60
Nikolay Payzulayev	4,387	0.91
Avkhat Khanchukayev	2,688	0.56
Against all	12,906	2.69
Total	479,655	100.00
Valid votes	479,655	96.06
Invalid/blank votes	19,670	3.94
Total votes	499,325	100.00
Registered voters/turnout	569,347	87.70
Source: Scilla
