= Feodor Pryanishnikov =

Russian postal administrator

Feodor Ivanovich Pryanishnikov
- Фёдор Иванович Прянишников
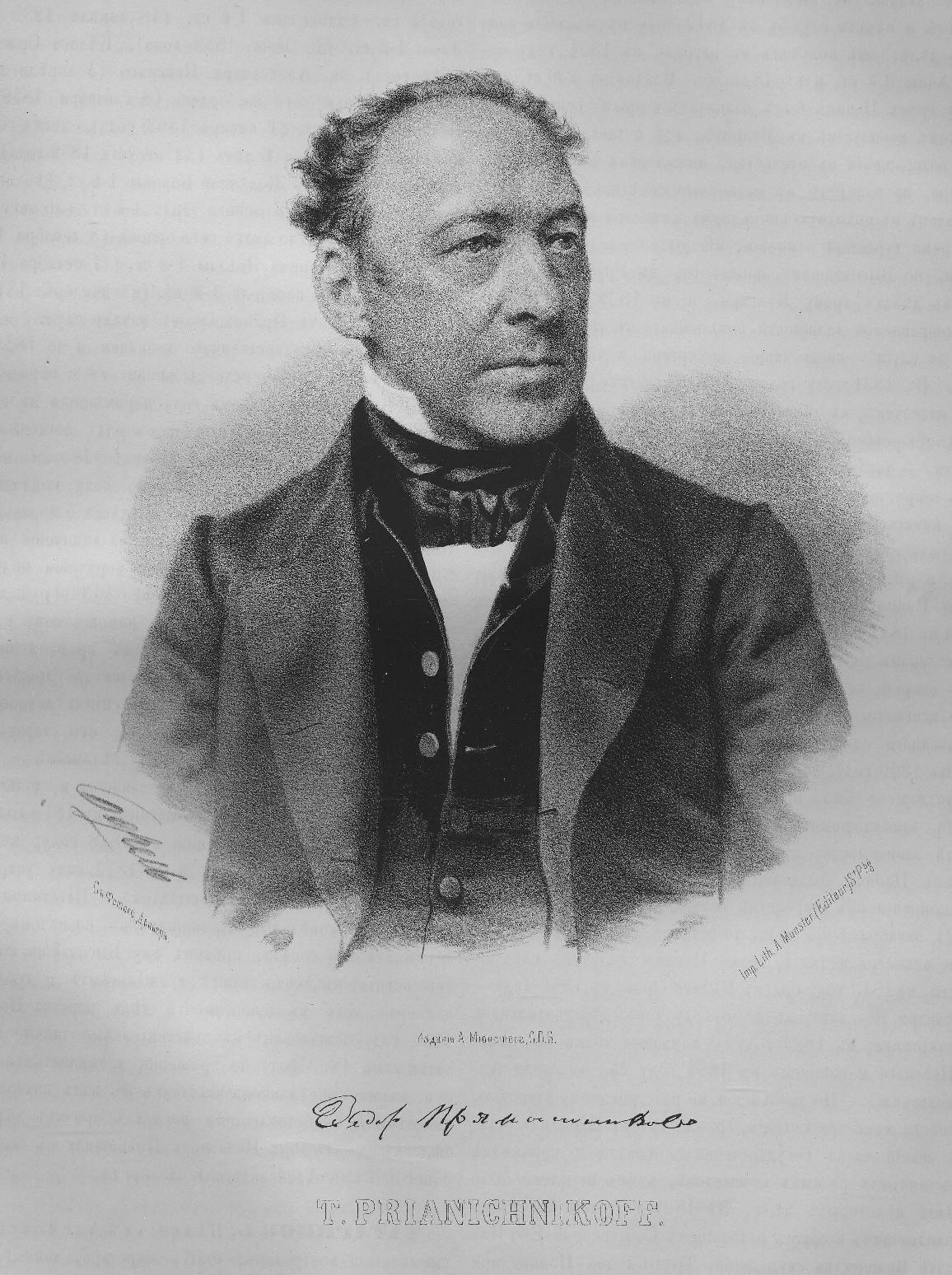
- Born: 2 February 1793; Perm
- Died: 28 April 1867 (aged 74); Saint Petersburg
- Resting place: Saint Petersburg; 59°53′52″N 30°19′30″E
- Education: Certificate of Higher Education
- Alma mater: Saint Petersburg State University
- Occupations: postal administrator, actual privy councillor
- Years active: 1804–1866
- Known for: civil service, patronage
- Title: Director of the St. Petersburg Post Office and Russian Postal Department
- Term: 1835–1863
- Predecessor: Konstantin Bulgakov
- Successor: Ivan Tolstoy
- Spouse: Vera Leonrod (m. 1818–1867)
- Awards: Order of St. Anna; 1824, 1827, 1839 Order of St. Vladimir; 1825, 1828, 1843, 1863; Order of Saint Stanislaus; 1837; Order of the Red Eagle; 1838, 1843; Order of the Iron Crown; 1843; Order of the White Eagle; 1846; Order of the Polar Star; 1846; Order of the Redeemer; 1848; Order of St. Alexander Nevsky; 1851

Feodor Ivanovich Pryanishnikov (Russian: Фёдор Иванович Прянишников; 2 February 1793 – 28 April 1867) was a Russian actual privy councillor and postal administrator. At the height of his career (1857–1863), F. I. Pryanishnikov ultimately run the Russian postal department on an equal footing with ministers.

== Biography ==
In 1824, F. I. Pryanishnikov joined the Postal Department of the Russian Empire. He worked under the Department's Commander-in-Chief Prince Alexander Golitsyn. The Russian Tsar Nicholas I wanted to reform the department. He asked Golitsyn to study postal systems of Prussia and Great Britain. Pryanishnikov knew English, and Golitsyn sent him abroad. Pryanishnikov did this task in May 1827 to June 1828. In Britain, he wished to get access to information about the Post Office service. His request was examined by the General Post Office and Foreign Office and refused. Eventually, the Postmaster General met Pryanishnikov's request. On 14 November 1827, the Post Office notified the Foreign Office that Praynishnikov was allowed to get such information.

When Pryanishnikov came back to Russia, he wrote a detailed report. It included proposals for reforms. The report was given to a special committee. One of its members was Konstantin Bulgakov. After examination, the report and proposals were submitted to the Tsar. He approved them. In 1830, the postal reforms were started. In 1831, Pryanishnikov replaced Bulgakov as Director of St. Petersburg Post Office.

In 1842, Golitsyn gave up supervision of the Russian Postal Department. The Tsar replaced him with Count V. F. Adlerberg (1791–1884). Adlerberg was a close friend of the Tsar and one of his adjutants since 1817. Pryanishnikov was appointed as Director of the Postal Department. In 1852, Adlerberg was to become Minister of the Imperial Court. But he continued to head the Postal Department until 1857. Because of health reasons, Pryanishnikov had to give up work in 1854. However, he was asked in 1857 to take up the post of Commander-in-Chief of the Postal Department. He was directly subordinated to Nicholas' successor, Alexander II.

Feodor Pryanishnikov retired in 1863. He died four years later after a long illness.

== Postal reforms ==
After Bulgakov's death, Pryanishnikov continued his work of improving the postal services. Town post was organised in St. Petersburg in 1835 followed by similar services in Moscow (in 1844) and other cities. In 1843, a uniform postage rate was introduced that equaled 10 silver kopecks for 1 lot. In 1845, the town posts began using stamped envelopes, and this innovation was extended throughout Russia in 1848. Mail boxes were introduced in 1848.

Under Pryanishnikov, the first Russia's postage stamp, with face value of 10 kopecks, went on sale to the public at the end of December 1857. The steamship services started under Bulgakov were further developed. In 1838, mail transportation by rail began on the Russia's first railway between St. Petersburg and Tsarskoe Selo. In 1851, the first mail-coaches appeared on the newly opened railway service between St. Petersburg and Moscow, and this also enabled the electric telegraph. Subscription for newspapers and journals was offered via postal service. Post offices were subject to modernisation. Overall, the postal department essentially expanded in the size. In addition, postal treaties with Austria (1843), Greece (1848), Prussia (1843), and Sweden (1846) were signed by Pryanishnikov.

By the end of Pryanishnikov's service and retirement in 1863, the improvements and modernisation of Russia's postal system were in good progress. These developments coincided with the beginning of the reign of Alexander II and were supposed to go on for the rest of the century. However, internal political situation within Russia during the late 1860s and 1870s became less favourable. The Postal Directorate began losing its pace of development as an independent government agency, and was subordinated to the control of the Ministry of the Interior. No significant organisational changes of the Russian postal service occurred until the revolutions of 1917.

== See also ==
- Alexander Yakovlevich Bulgakov
- Konstantin Bulgakov
- Postage stamps and postal history of Russia
