= Alexander Bulgakov =

Russian diplomat and senator (1781-1863)

Alexander Yakovlevich Bulgakov
- Александр Яковлевич Булгаков
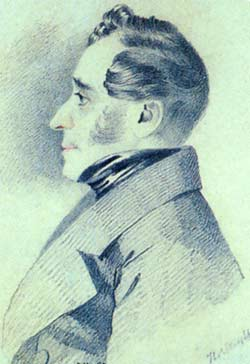
- Born: November 15, 1781; Constantinople
- Died: April 17, 1863 (aged 81); Dresden
- Resting place: Dresden
- Citizenship: Russian Empire
- Education: secondary
- Alma mater: Saint Peter's School
- Occupations: diplomat, senator, post director
- Years active: 1796–1863
- Employer: Governor General of Moscow
- Known for: correspondence, writing
- Title: Director of the Moscow Post Office
- Term: 1832–1856
- Spouses: Natalia Khovansky (1785–1841) (m. 1809–1841) Emerika Abramovich (m. 1845–1863)
- Children: 12 including: daughter Catherine Bulgakov (1811–1880) son Konstantin Bulgakov (1812–1862) daughter Olga Bulgakov (1814–1865) son Pavel Bulgakov (1825–1873)
- Parent(s): Yakov Bulgakov (1743–1809); Catherine Amber (?–1809)
- Relatives: brother Konstantin Bulgakov (1782–1835)

Alexander Yakovlevich Bulgakov (Russian: Александр Яковлевич Булгаков; 15 November 1781 – 17 April 1863) was a Russian diplomat, senator, and postal administrator.

== Biography ==
Alexander Bulgakov was born in 1781 in Constantinople in the family of a Russian diplomat, Yakov Bulgakov (1743–1809). At the beginning of his career, Bulgakov worked in the Ministry of Foreign Affairs. He served as an official with special duties attached to the Governor General of Moscow in 1809–1832.

In 1832, Bulgakov stopped his diplomatic career and was appointed to Director of Posts in Moscow. He served in this position in 1832–1856. His younger brother Konstantin Bulgakov (1782–1835) was the Director of the Saint Petersburg Post Office at that time. Because both were the top officers of the Russian Postal Service, they could freely correspond with each other. Both brothers were much respected by their staff for their effort to improve working conditions for postal workers.

== See also ==
- Feodor Pryanishnikov
- Konstantin Bulgakov
- Postage stamps and postal history of Russia
- Yakov Bulgakov
