= Valery Baranov (soldier) =

Russian general

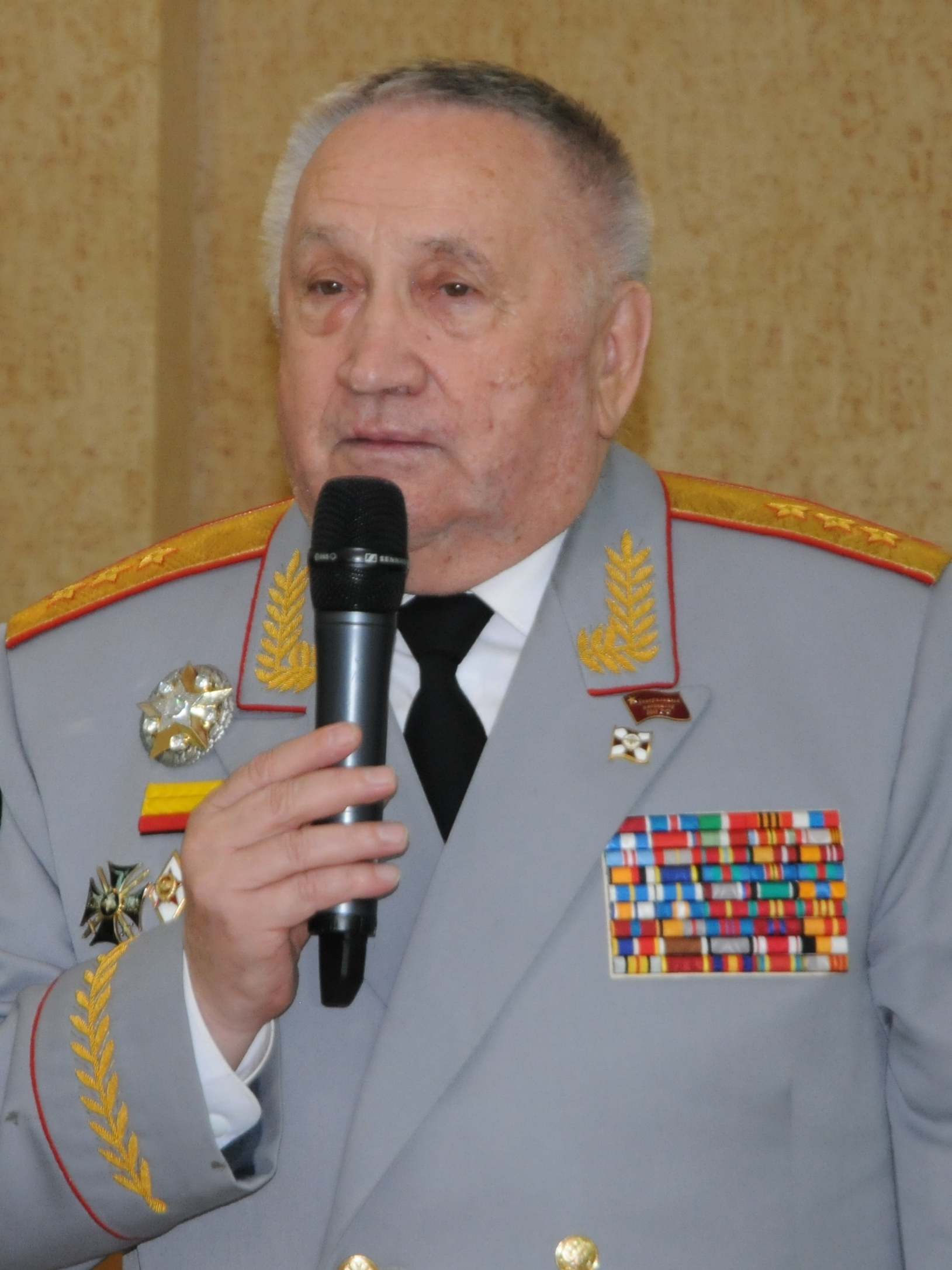
- Native name: Валерий Петрович Баранов
- Born: 16 November 1948 (age 77); Tashla, Tashlinsky District, Orenburg Oblast, Soviet Union
- Allegiance: Soviet Union; Russia
- Branch: Soviet Army; Russian Internal Troops
- Service years: 1966–2008
- Rank: Colonel general
- Commands: 2nd Guards Tank Division; 55th Army Corps; Joint Group of Forces in the North Caucasus
- Conflicts: Second Chechen War
- Awards: Order of Courage; Order of Military Merit; Order for Service to the Homeland in the Armed Forces of the USSR, 3rd class

Valery Petrovich Baranov (Russian: Валерий Петрович Баранов; born 16 November 1948) is a retired colonel general of the Internal Troops of Russia.

== Biography ==
Baranov was born on 16 November 1948 in Orenburg Oblast. He graduated from the Kazan Higher Tank Command School (1970), the Military Armored Forces Academy (1978), the Academy of the General Staff (1988), and the Russian Academy of Civil Service (1998).

Baranov commanded the 2nd Guards Tank Division in Mongolia and at Mirnaya, Zabaykalsky Krai, in the Siberian Military District in 1989-90. He served as the deputy commander-in-chief of the forces of the Moscow Military District for combat training and as the deputy commander-in-chief of forces of the North Caucasus Military District from July 2000 to October 2001. He commanded the united group of the troops in the North-Caucasian region since August 2002.

He held the post of the deputy commander-in-chief of the internal troops of the Ministry of Internal Affairs of Russia since September 2003 until May 2004.

On 9 May 2004 he lost a leg during the assassination of Akhmad Kadyrov in Grozny, Chechen Republic, Russian Federation.

Baranov retired in 2008. He participated in the writing of the 12-volume Great Patriotic War history Великая Отечественная война 1941—1945 годов (English: History of the Great Patriotic War 1941–1945). Baranov helped write the book История внутренних войск (English: History of the Internal Troops).

He is married and has two children and one granddaughter.

Military offices
Preceded by Gennady Troshev	Commander of the Joint Group of Forces in the North Caucasus; 2000–2001	Succeeded by Vladimir Moltenskoy
