= Konstantin Bulgakov =

Russian diplomat (1782–1835)

- Константин Булгаков
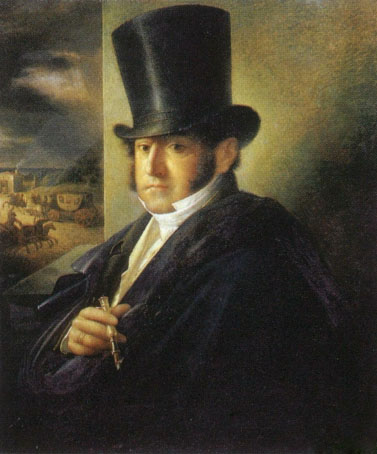
- Born: December 31, 1782; Constantinople, Ottoman Empire
- Died: October 29, 1835 (aged 52); Saint Petersburg, Russia
- Resting place: Saint Petersburg, Russia; 59°55′11″N 30°23′19″E
- Education: Saint Peter's School
- Occupations: Diplomat; postal administrator; privy councillor
- Years active: 1797–1835
- Known for: Correspondence, writing
- Title: Director of the St. Petersburg Post Office and Russian Postal Department
- Term: 1819–1835
- Successor: Feodor Pryanishnikov
- Spouse: Maria Varlam (m. 1814–1835)
- Children: 5
- Parents: Yakov Bulgakov (father); Catherine Amber (mother)
- Relatives: Alexander Bulgakov (elder brother)
- Awards: Order of St. Vladimir; 1821 Order of the White Eagle; 1832

Konstantin Yakovlevich Bulgakov (Russian: Константин Яковлевич Булгаков; 31 December 1782 – 29 October 1835) was a Russian diplomat, privy councillor, and postal administrator.

Konstantin Bulgakov served as the director of the Moscow Post Office. From 1819, he was the director of the Saint Petersburg Post Office. Bulgakov later became the director of the Postal Department of the Russian Empire. He and his brother Alexander Bulgakov, director of the Moscow Post Office, could freely correspond with each other because both were the top officers of the Russian Postal Service.

== Biography ==
Konstantin Bulgakov was the son of a diplomat, Yakov Bulgakov (1743–1809). He was born in Constantinople in 1782. Bulgakov began working in the Ministry of Foreign Affairs in 1797. Thanks to his linguistic skills, he served in a diplomatic capacity during Russia's wars with Turkey and France. At the Congress of Vienna in 1815, Bulgakov assisted the Russian Tsar Alexander I and the Foreign Minister. The Tsar offered him an ambassador position in Copenhagen. However, Bulgakov asked the Tsar for his appointment as Director of Posts in Moscow in February 1816. He soon succeeded in this post and was transferred to Saint Petersburg on 23 December 1819. As Director of Saint Petersburg Posts, Bulgakov worked there with Prince Golitsyn, who was in charge of the Russian Postal Department.

In 1831, Bulgakov was promoted to the director of the Postal Department and decorated. However, he suffered two strokes in 1835. That was a consequence of overwork. Bulgakov died the same year.

== Postal reforms ==
Among Bulgakov's innovations was the establishment of passenger-carrying mail-coaches between the major towns of Russia and the Baltic provinces. These services started in 1821 and worked, until they were replaced with the railway in 1868.

In 1825, the first survey of post-roads in Russia was published. Begun in 1817, construction of paved roads continued and reached over 1,500 miles by the 1850s. This progress enabled Bulgakov to introduce a system of express posts ("extra" posts) between major cities.

Bulgakov also concluded a postal treaty with Prussia. In 1832, he set up a steamship service between Saint Petersburg and Lübeck.

All these improvements reduced the delivery times for mail. For example, mail from Berlin to Saint Petersburg came in five days instead of nine. The Dowager Empress Maria Feodorovna, the widow of Paul I and a former German princess, praised the better postal service.

Bulgakov paid much attention to improve working conditions for postal workers.

== See also ==
- Alexander Yakovlevich Bulgakov
- Feodor Pryanishnikov
- Postage stamps and postal history of Russia
- Yakov Bulgakov
