= Chechenization =

Russian government policy

Chechenization was a policy of the Russian Federation adopted during the Second Chechen War from 2001 onwards whereby pro-Moscow leaders such as Akhmad Kadyrov were elected in Chechnya, in elections organized by Russia that followed a constitutional referendum also organized by Russia, with the intent of this government, rather than Russia, then becoming responsible for fighting separatists.

== See also ==
- Vietnamization
