= Ivan Matveyevich Tolstoy =

Russian diplomat

- Иван Матвеевич Толстой
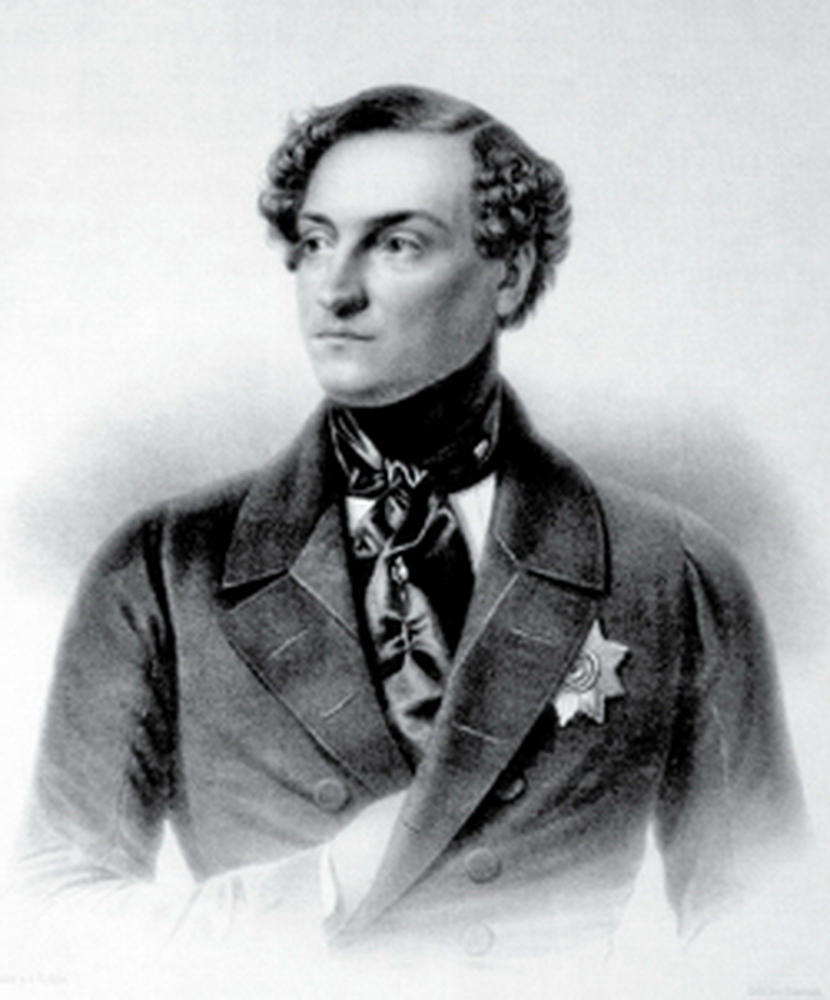
- Born: 3 April 1806
- Died: 3 October 1867 (aged 61); Saint Petersburg
- Resting place: Saint Petersburg
- Citizenship: Russian Empire
- Occupation: postal administrator
- Years active: 1822–1867
- Title: Director of the Russian Postal Department, Minister of Posts and Telegraphs
- Term: 1863–1867
- Predecessor: Feodor Pryanishnikov
- Successor: Alexander Timashev
- Spouse: Elizaveta Tulinova (1826–1870) (m. 1844–1867)
- Children: 4 including: Ivan Tolstoy (1858–1916); Dmitri Tolstoy (1860–1941)
- Parent(s): Matvei Tolstoy (1772–1815); Praskovia Golenischeva-Kutuzova (1777–1844)
- Relatives: brothers: Nikolai Matveyevich Tolstoy (1802–1879); Feofil Matveyevich Tolstoy (1809–1881)

Count Ivan Matveyevich Tolstoy (Russian: Ива́н Матве́евич Толсто́й; 3 April [O.S. 22 March] 1806 – 3 October [O.S. 21 September] 1867) was a Russian nobleman, diplomat, senator, grand master of court ceremonies, and minister of postal service.

== Biography ==
Count I. M. Tolstoy worked in the Ministry of Foreign Affairs until 1860. For a brief interval, he served as Chief Steward of the Imperial Household and was grand master of court ceremonies. In 1863, he became Feodor Pryanishnikov's immediate successor as Head of the Postal Department.

In 1865, he was appointed to the first Minister of Posts and Telegraphs. An attempt to merge the postal and telegraph services was not successful. Only in 1884, during the reign of Alexander III, were the two services amalgamated. This resulted in the depiction of thunderbolts and post horns on Russian postage stamps.

Tolstoy died in 1867. He was replaced by General A. Ye. Timashev (1818–1893) as the Minister of Posts and Telegraphs.

== See also ==
- Feodor Pryanishnikov
- Postage stamps and postal history of Russia
- Samuel Polyakov
- Tolstoy (family)
