= Tashla, Republic of Bashkortostan =

Tashla Ташла
- Village
- Location within Bashkortostan Location within Russia
- Coordinates: 53°54′N 56°38′E
- Country: Russia
- Region: Bashkortostan
- District: Gafuriysky District
- Time zone: UTC+5:00

Tashla (Russian: Ташла; Bashkir: Ташлы, Taşlı) is a rural locality (a village) in Tashlinsky Selsoviet, Gafuriysky District, Bashkortostan, Russia. The population was 507 as of 2010. There are 8 streets.

== Geography ==
Tashla is located 12 km east of Krasnousolsky (the district's administrative centre) by road. Pchelosovkhoz is the nearest rural locality.
