= Sergey Abramov (politician, born 1972) =

Russian politician in Chechnya

- Сергей Абрамов
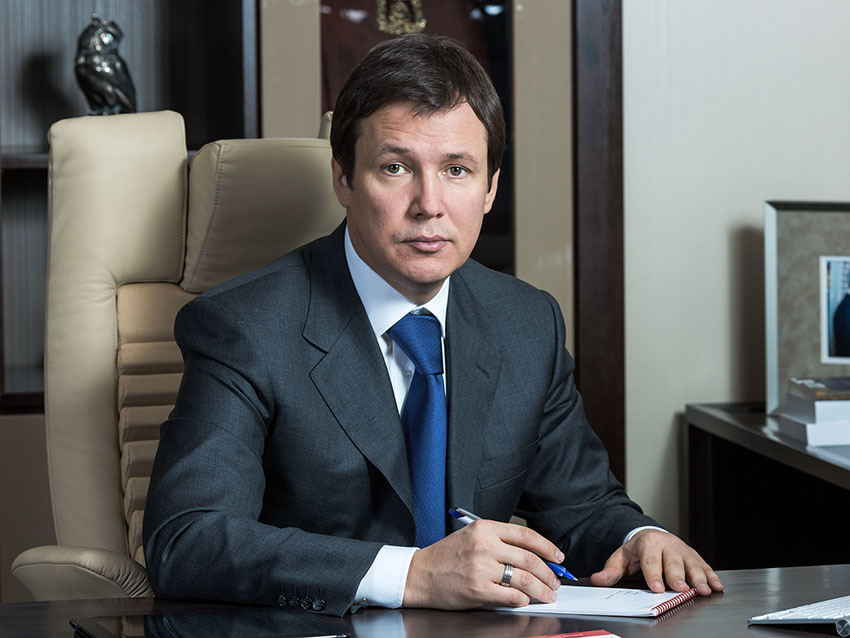
- Abramov in 2012

Acting President of the Chechen Republic
- In office 9 May 2004 – 30 August 2004
- Preceded by: Akhmad Kadyrov
- Succeeded by: Alu Alkhanov

Prime Minister of the Chechen Republic
- In office 24 March 2004 – 28 February 2006 (Incapacitated: 18 November 2005 – 28 February 2006)
- Succeeded by: Ramzan Kadyrov

Minister of Finance of the Chechen Republic
- In office 2002 – 24 March 2004

Personal details
- Born: Sergey Borisovich Abramov; February 29, 1972 (age 54) Moscow, Soviet Union
- Party: Independent (Non-Partisan)

Sergey Borisovich Abramov (Russian: Сергей Борисович Абрамов; Born February 29, 1972) is a Russian business executive of Russian Railways and a former politician. Abramov is a graduate of the Tashkent State University of Economics.

== Head of the republic ==
In 2002, during the presidency of Akhmad Kadyrov, 30-year-old Abramov was appointed minister of finance of the Chechen Republic and continued until his appointment as prime minister. On 24 March 2004, he was appointed Prime Minister (Chairman of the Government) of the Chechen Republic by President Kadyrov with approval of the legislature. After the assassination of President Kadyrov, Abramov became acting president as per the constitutional provision at the time; his tenure as Acting President ended following the presidential election. He himself survived a series of assassination attempts.

== Later career ==
On 18 November 2005, Abramov survived a near-fatal car crash in Moscow and temporarily disappeared from public view. On 28 February 2006, he resigned as prime minister, ostensibly for health reasons but in reality to make space for Ramzan Kadyrov to be permanent prime minister. He is an ethnic Russian and had pro-Russian and Russian unitary political views in his administrations of Chechnya. He moved to Chechnya for his political career.

As of November 2010, Abramov chaired the Directorate of Railway Terminals of Russian Railways and was managing an ambitious program of rebuilding the stations in major cities.

== Activity in Chechnya ==
In March 2001, Sergey Abramov was appointed Minister of Finance of the Chechen Republic.

In this position, he proved himself a strict and uncompromising defender of state interests. According to retired FSB Lieutenant General Sergey Babkin, it was impossible to obtain money from the republican treasury without legal grounds under Abramov’s leadership, even under the threat of execution.[13] About this period Abramov said:

“I see myself as a reformer. I am a professional manager and I have a good understanding of finance and economics.”

On 13 May 2002, he was hit by a car in central Moscow while leaving the building of the Ministry of Finance of the Russian Federation. He sustained a concussion, a broken collarbone, and multiple bruises.

On 10 January 2003, the head of the Chechen administration, Akhmat Kadyrov, dismissed Abramov from the post of Minister of Finance, appointing Eli Isaev as his successor.

== Adviser to the Chairman of the Accounts Chamber ==
In January 2003, Abramov was appointed adviser to Sergey Stepashin, Chairman of the Accounts Chamber of the Russian Federation. In March of the same year, he headed the Chamber’s inspection department for operational control over the expenditure of budgetary funds in the Chechen Republic.

== First Deputy Chairman of the Government of Khabarovsk Krai ==
From April 14, 2025, he was appointed to the position of First Deputy Chairman of the Government of Khabarovsk Krai.

== Family ==
His wife, Alla Anatolyevna Kalashnik (born November 19, 1963), works at Vnesheconombank of Russia. They have a son, Nikolay (born 2004).
