= Malik Saidullaev =

Russian businessman of Chechen descent (born 1964)

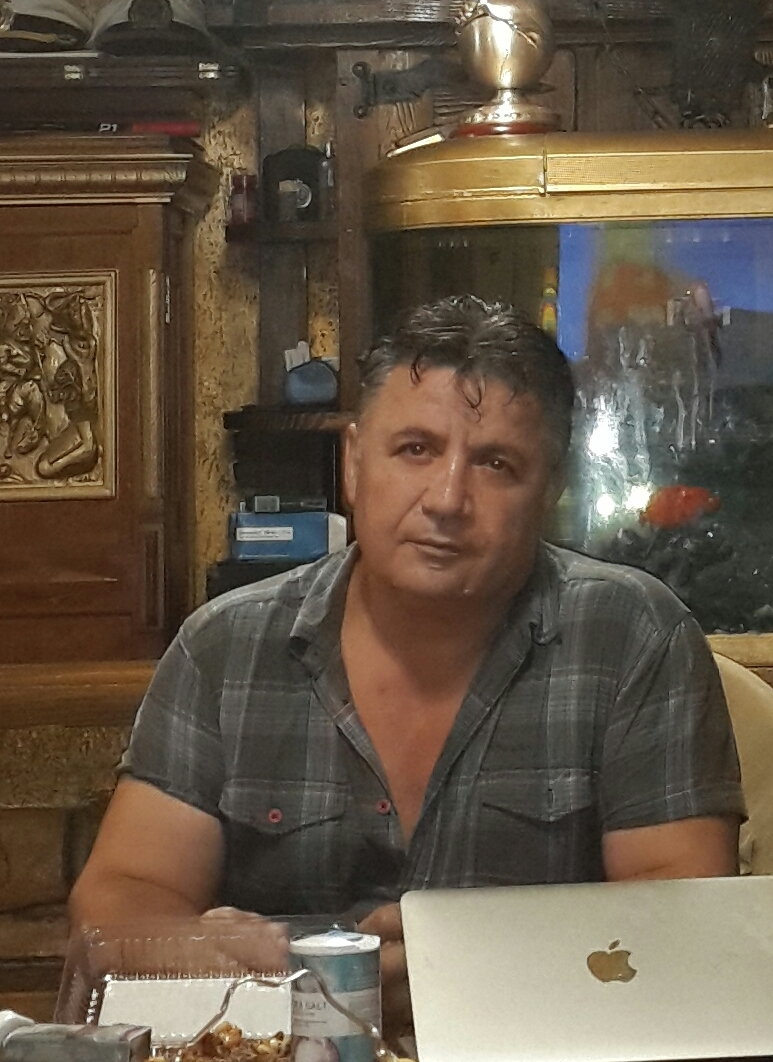
- Born: October 5, 1964 (age 60); Alkhan-yurt, Checheno-Ingush ASSR, Russian SFSR, Soviet Union
- Children: 2

Malik Mingaevich Saidullaev (Russian: Малик Мингаевич Сайдуллаев; born 5 October 1964) is a Russian businessman of Chechen descent.

== Biography ==
Malik Saidullaev was born on October 5, 1964 in Checheno-Ingush Autonomous Soviet Socialist Republic.

In 1981 he graduated from high school. He served in the army and graduated from Grozny State University.

=== Personal life ===
Malik Saidullaev is married and has 2 children.

== Career ==
During the Second Chechen War Saidullaev was reported of being instrumental in the early defections of several Chechen commanders to the Russian side. On August 27, 2003 while working as the chairman of the Council of Directors of the Open Society Group of the company Milan he was registered by the electoral committee of the Chechen Republic as a presidential candidate.

== Controversies ==
On September 11, after Saidullaev - who is known in criminal circles as "the businessman of FSB" - was defamed by another presidential candidate, the Lubyanka poet Nikolay Paizullaev, the Supreme Court of the Chechen republic decided to cancel Saidullaev's registration, clearing the way to the president in Grozny for another pro-Moscow candidate Akhmad Kadyrov, who notoriously dismissed Saidullaev as 'too weak to rule'. Saidullaev commented at the briefing in Moscow: "Under the present circumstances I think the forthcoming elections to be a farce."

Following Akhmad Kadyrov's murder, Saidullaev again attempted to run for president until it was claimed that he was using a false Chechen passport. Being denied once again, the presidency was captured by Alu Alkhanov, who was inaugurated amid tight security in October 2004 following the assassination of his predecessor. Saidullaev predicted a fast death for Alkhanov.

On October 26, 2007, Saidullaev was injured by a two gunshot wounds in Moscow's Leninsky Prospekt.
