= Akhmad Kadyrov =

Chechen militant and revolutionary (1951–2004)

Akhmat Kadyrov
- Ахмат Кадыров (Russian); Ахьмад Къадири (Chechen)
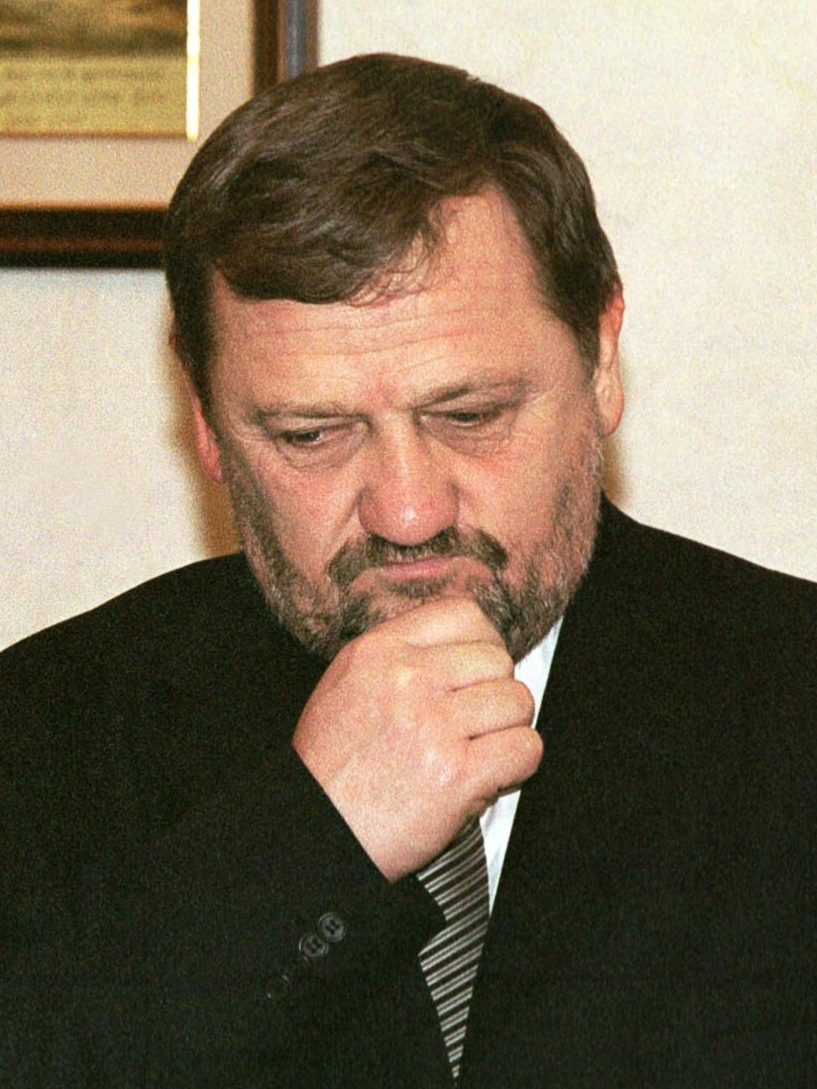
- Kadyrov in 2002

1st President of the Chechen Republic
- In office 5 October 2003 – 9 May 2004
- Preceded by: Office established
- Succeeded by: Sergei Abramov (acting); Alu Alkhanov

Head of the Administration of the Chechen Republic
- Interim
- In office 12 June 2000 – 4 October 2003
- Preceded by: Office established
- Succeeded by: Office abolished Himself (as President)

Mufti of the Spiritual Administration of the Muslims of the Chechen Republic
- In office 1994/95–2000

Personal details
- Born: 23 August 1951 Karaganda, Kazakh SSR, Soviet Union
- Died: 9 May 2004 (aged 52) Grozny, Chechnya, Russia
- Cause of death: Assassination
- Resting place: Akhmat-Yurt
- Spouse: Ayman Nisievna Kadyrova
- Children: 4, including Ramzan
- Parents: Abdulkhamid Kadyrov (father); Dika Kadyrova (mother)
- Profession: Cleric

Military service
- Allegiance: Chechen Republic of Ichkeria (1991–2000); Russia (2000–2004)
- Battles/wars: First Chechen War; Second Chechen War

Akhmat-Khadzhi Abdulkhamidovich Kadyrov (Note: Russian: Ахмат-Хаджи Абдулхамидович Кадыров, romanized: Akhmat-Hadzhi Abdulkhamidovich Kadyrov Chechen: Ахьмад-Хьажи Ӏабдулхьамидан кӀант Къадири, romanized: Aẋmad-Ẋaƶi Jabdulẋamidan khant Q̇adiri) (23 August 1951 – 9 May 2004) was a Chechen politician and revolutionary who served as Chief Mufti of the Chechen Republic of Ichkeria in the 1990s during and after the First Chechen War. At the outbreak of the Second Chechen War, he switched sides, offering his service to the Russian government, and later became the President of the Chechen Republic from 5 October 2003, having acted as head of administration from July 2000.

On 9 May 2004, he was assassinated by Chechen Islamists in Grozny, by a bomb blast during a Victory Day memorial parade. His son, Ramzan Kadyrov, who led his father's militia, became his successor in March 2007 as the President of the Chechen Republic.

== Early life ==
Kadyrov was born on 23 August 1951 in Karaganda in the Kazakh Soviet Socialist Republic, to a Chechen family that had been exiled during the deportation of the Chechens and Ingush in 1944. Caucasian Knot has named the village of Malaya Saran in Karaganda Region as his birthplace. He came from a religious family and belonged to the Benoy teip, and his family followed the Kunta-Hajji branch of the Qadiriyya Sufi order. In 1957, after the Chechens were allowed to return home, his family settled in the Shalinsky District of the Chechen-Ingush ASSR. After leaving school, he trained as a combine harvester operator and worked on the Novogroznensky state farm, and he then spent about nine years working in construction, including in Siberia.

== Religious education ==
In 1980, at the age of 29, Kadyrov was sent to study at the Mir-i Arab Madrasah in Bukhara, and he went on to graduate from the Imam al-Bukhari Islamic Institute in Tashkent. At about the age of 35, he became deputy imam of a mosque in Gudermes. In 1989, he initiated the founding of the North Caucasus Islamic Institute in Kurchaloy, which opened in 1991 and which he headed until 1994. According to Caucasian Knot, he studied at the Sharia faculty of the University of Jordan in 1990 and 1991, while The Irish Times and The Scotsman wrote that he interrupted his studies at a Muslim university in Oman in 1991 to join the separatist movement.

== Mufti of Ichkeria ==
Kadyrov returned to Chechnya in the autumn of 1991, when the republic declared independence, and he became deputy to the mufti Muhammad-Bashir Arsanukaev. He fought with separatist units against federal troops in the First Chechen War. He became acting mufti in 1994, was elected mufti in 1995 at a meeting of Islamic scholars and field commanders, and was re-elected by a congress of scholars in 1996. The Irish Times reported that the separatist leader Dzhokhar Dudayev appointed him supreme mufti. As mufti, he headed the spiritual administration of Chechnya's Muslims under Ichkeria.

At a congress in Shatoy in April 1995, Kadyrov supported a jihad against Russia. The Moscow Times reported that he declared, "There are a million Chechens, and 150 million Russians. If every Chechen kills 150 Russians, we will win." He later recalled, "I called on Chechens to kill as many as you can." He took part in the 1996 peace talks that led to the withdrawal of Russian forces.

During the period of de facto independence that followed, Kadyrov opposed the Wahhabi movement. In October 1998, he survived a remote-controlled bomb attack near the mufti's building, which wounded his driver.

== Second Chechen War ==
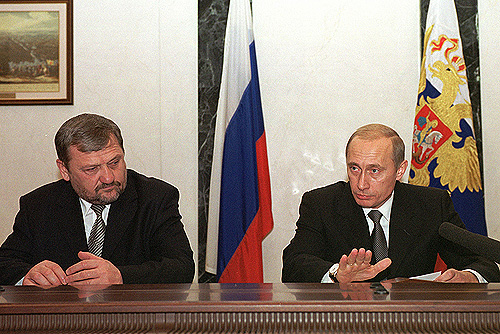
Kadyrov and Vladimir Putin at a meeting in 2002

In June 1999, Kadyrov took part in a meeting of separatist forces at which he was elected military amir, in what Caucasian Knot described as an unsuccessful attempt to challenge President Aslan Maskhadov. He condemned the incursion into Dagestan by Shamil Basayev and Ibn al-Khattab in August 1999 as "dual treason", described radical Islam as alien to Chechen traditions, and refused to support a new jihad. Maskhadov dismissed him as mufti. Caucasian Knot dates the decree to August 1999, while Kommersant reported that Maskhadov publicly called him a traitor and removed him from the post on 10 October 1999 for refusing to declare a holy war against Russia. Kadyrov did not recognise the decree.

By the autumn of 1999, Kadyrov had abandoned the insurgency and offered his support to the Russian federal forces. Together with the Yamadayev brothers, he declared the Gudermes and Kurchaloy districts a "territory free of Wahhabism" and helped Russian troops to take control of them without fighting. On 28 November 1999, Maskhadov declared him "enemy number one" for negotiating with Putin, and a separatist Sharia court sentenced him to death the same day. In December 1999, Basayev and Khattab offered a reward of $100,000 for his head. According to the political scientist James Hughes, Kadyrov's change of sides may have been motivated partly by personal ambition and partly by concern over the desperate condition of the Chechen population, and it was also driven by fear of the growing Wahhabi influence on the insurgency.

== Head of the Chechen Republic ==
=== Head of administration ===
Four days after imposing direct rule on Chechnya, Putin appointed Kadyrov interim head of the administration of the Chechen Republic on 12 June 2000. The Russian commander, Colonel General Gennady Troshev, called him "well-known and trusted", while the chairman of the pro-Moscow Chechen State Council, Malik Saidullayev, who had wanted the post himself, opposed the appointment. According to Caucasian Knot, only three of Chechnya's 18 district heads supported his appointment, and he was sworn in on 20 June 2000. He said that his immediate priority was to end the fighting, and that he aimed to eradicate the "pseudo-leaders of Islam who go by the name of wahhabis". On 22 August 2000, he gave up the post of mufti, and Akhmad Shamaev was elected to replace him.

Kadyrov was tasked with organising the constitutional referendum held on 23 March 2003. According to preliminary figures, turnout was 89.48% and 95.97% of voters approved the new constitution, while Human Rights Watch and Memorial reported low turnout among displaced people and few voters at polling stations. In June 2003, the State Duma approved an amnesty for rebels who surrendered their weapons, and Kadyrov pledged to guarantee personally the safety of fighters who laid down their arms. Former rebel commanders, including Magomed Khambiev, and their fighters later joined his side, which angered Russian security officials.

=== President ===
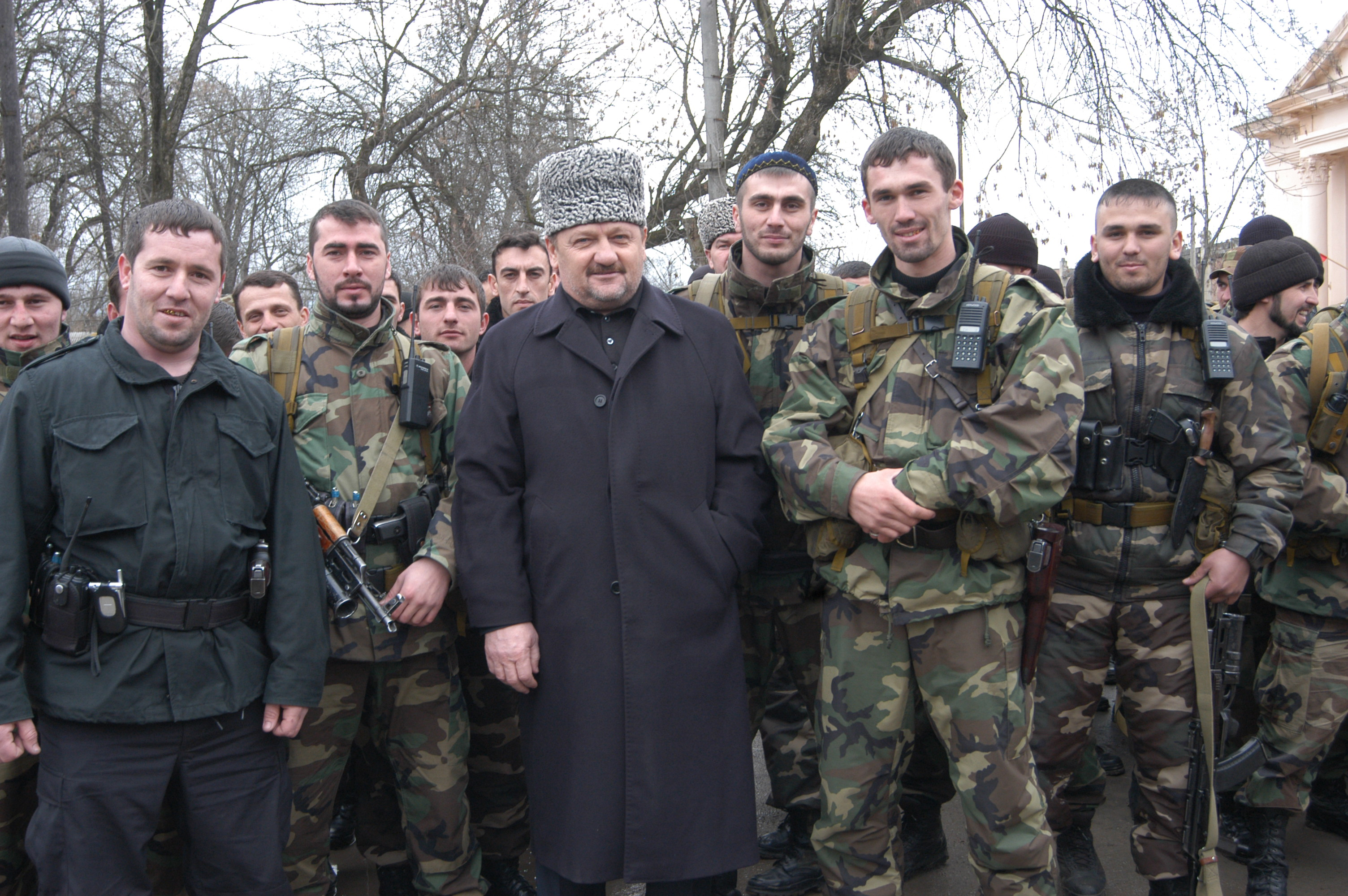
Kadyrov with members of Kadyrovtsy (2004)

On 5 October 2003, Kadyrov was elected the first President of the Chechen Republic with 80.84% of the vote, according to official results, and he took office on 19 October. Three of his main rivals withdrew before polling day, and a fourth was disqualified over an alleged procedural violation. The OSCE and the Parliamentary Assembly of the Council of Europe declined to send observers, and critics dismissed the election as a farce. Some Russian newspapers reported empty polling stations, despite an official turnout of 81%. The Scotsman wrote that two candidates who had rated higher than Kadyrov in early opinion polls had "disappeared from the ballot".

Kadyrov's personal security service, headed by Ramzan, became the basis of most of Chechnya's later law enforcement and security units. In January 2004, the director of RFE/RL's North Caucasus Service estimated that at least 4,000 fighters, many of them former rebels, served under Kadyrov and his son, and rights activists accused the force of abductions and torture. Thomas de Waal argued that the Kremlin's policy of "Chechenization" had given these forces free rein to terrorise civilians. Government auditors accused his administration of misappropriating reconstruction funds, while Kadyrov blamed Russian forces for violence against civilians. In the weeks before his death, he campaigned for most Russian forces to be withdrawn and for formal control to be handed to his armed supporters.

Kadyrov survived about a dozen assassination attempts. On 14 May 2003, a suicide bomber in Iliskhan-Yurt killed 18 people, including four of his guards, but Kadyrov was unharmed.

== Personal life ==
Kadyrov's elder son, Zelimkhan, died on 31 May 2004, three weeks after his father. His younger son, Ramzan, headed his personal security service and later became the leader of Chechnya.

== Death ==
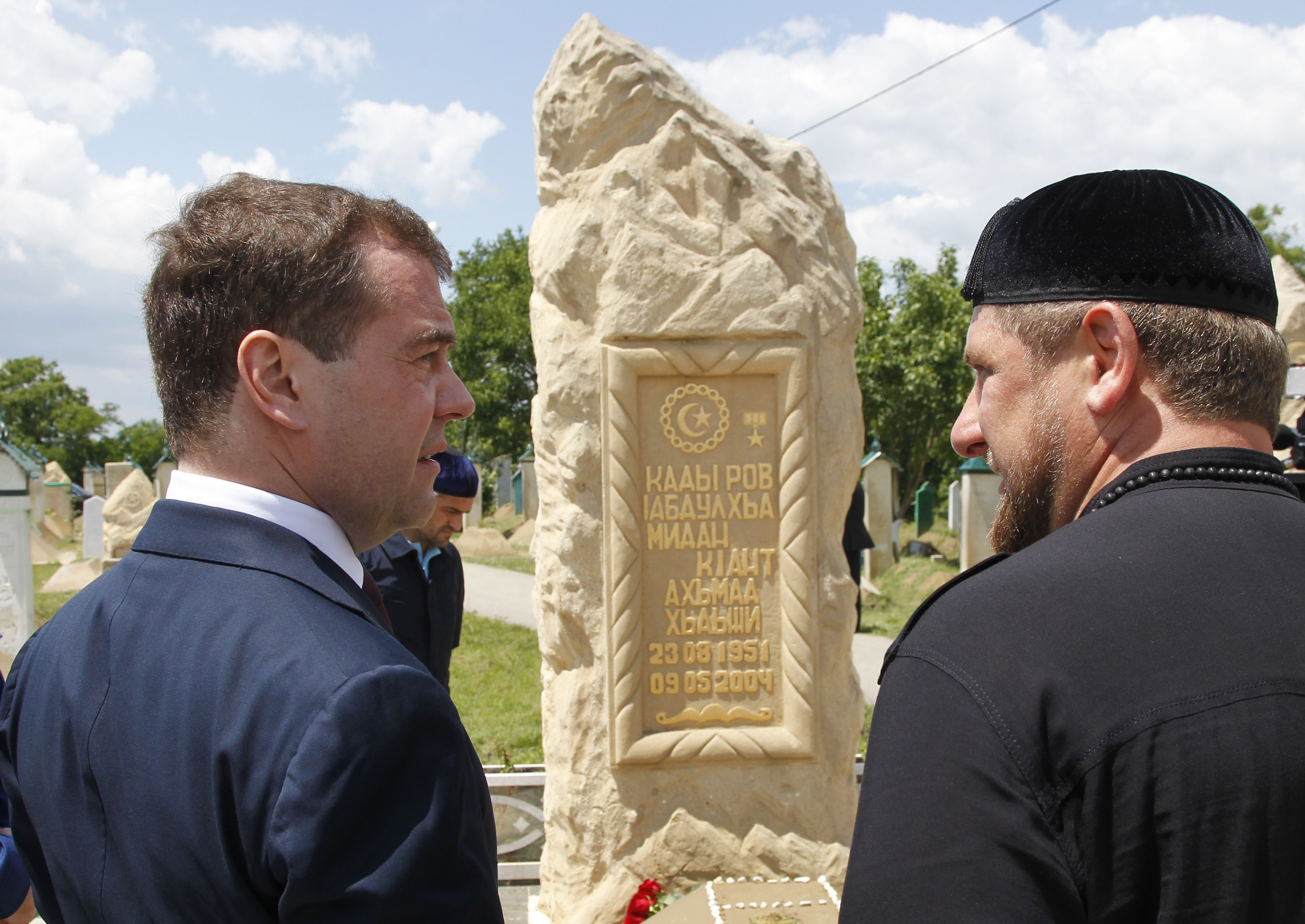
Russian Prime Minister Dmitry Medvedev and Ramzan Kadyrov at the grave of Akhmat Kadyrov in June 2012

On 9 May 2004, a bomb exploded under the VIP stand of Grozny's Dynamo Stadium during a Victory Day parade, killing Kadyrov. Those killed included Hussein Isayev, the chairman of the Chechen State Council, two of Kadyrov's bodyguards, and a Chechen journalist working for Reuters. Reported death tolls varied from six or seven in early Russian reports to 24 in a later count by the Associated Press, and a 2008 report stated that more than 30 people had died. More than 50 people were injured, including Colonel General Valery Baranov, the commander of Russian forces in Chechnya, whose leg was amputated. According to Chechnya's chief prosecutor, a 152-millimetre artillery shell had been hidden inside the reinforced concrete under the stands, and the acting interior minister, Alu Alkhanov, said that the explosive had been sealed into a wall of the VIP terrace during reconstruction.

Basayev claimed responsibility, and he later said that he had paid $50,000 for the attack. No one has been convicted of the killing, and in 2009 Ramzan Kadyrov said that those connected with the attack had been "destroyed". Kadyrov was buried on 10 May 2004 in his family's village of Tsentoroi, and about 3,000 people joined the funeral procession.

Putin called Kadyrov "a truly heroic person" who had "passed away undefeated". The liberal politician Irina Khakamada called him "an illegitimate president". Putin appointed the prime minister, Sergei Abramov, as acting president, and Ramzan Kadyrov became Abramov's first deputy.

== Legacy ==
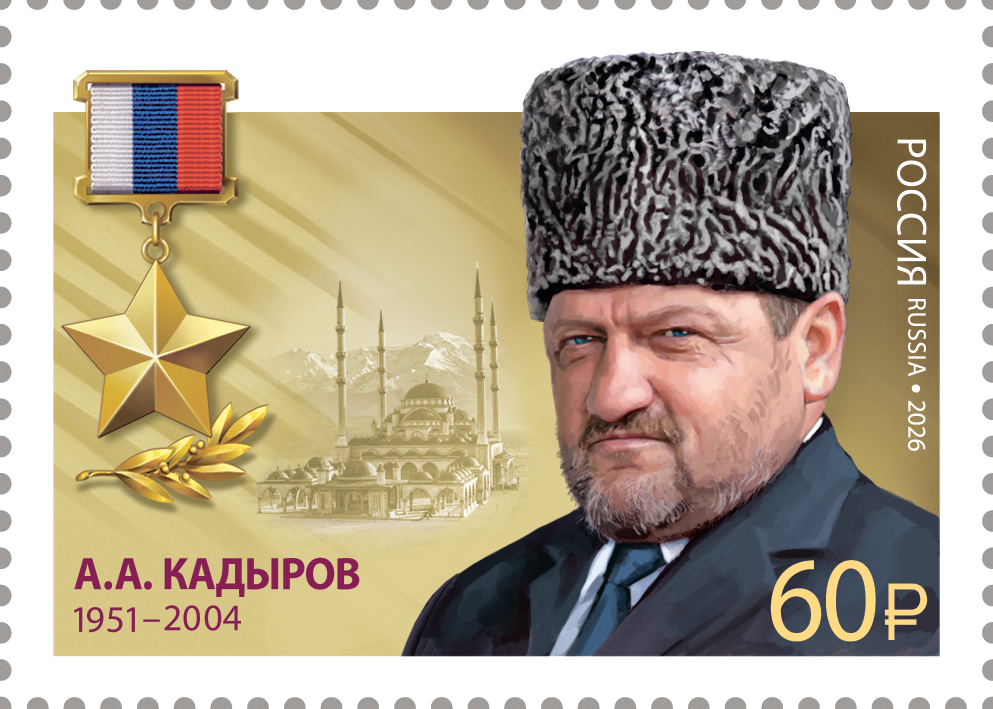
Kadyrov on a 2026 stamp of Russia

Kadyrov was posthumously awarded the title of Hero of the Russian Federation in 2004. In December 2019, after the film director Alexander Sokurov questioned the award of the title to Chechens who had fought against Russia, Putin defended the decision and said that Kadyrov had died "for Chechnya, for the Chechen people and for Russia".

Many places and organisations in Chechnya are named after Kadyrov, including streets, schools, mosques, Grozny's airport and a special forces unit. On 7 June 2017, the football club Terek Grozny was renamed Akhmat Grozny in his honour. The Akhmad Kadyrov Mosque in Grozny, which can hold 10,000 worshippers, opened in October 2008. A mosque named after him in the village of Abu Ghosh in Israel was inaugurated in March 2014. In July 2019, the Chechen parliament approved the renaming of Tsentoroi as Akhmat-Yurt, which Ekaterina Sokiryanskaya, the director of the Centre for Conflict Analysis and Prevention, said showed a strengthening of the "Kadyrov personality cult".

In June 2016, the governor of Saint Petersburg, Georgy Poltavchenko, confirmed the naming of a bridge in the city after Kadyrov, despite protests and an online petition against it that had gathered almost 100,000 signatures. In Kazakhstan, a memorial sign at his birthplace in Malaya Saran was unveiled in 2012 and destroyed by vandals in August 2023. In July 2026, the Bank of Russia issued a silver two-rouble coin marking the 75th anniversary of his birth, as part of its "Outstanding Personalities of Russia" series.

== See also ==
- List of unsolved murders (2000–present)
- List of Heroes of the Russian Federation
- Kadyrovites
- Politics of Chechnya

== Notes ==
Political offices
New office	President of the Chechen Republic; 2003–2004	Succeeded by Alu Alkhanov
