= Tashla, Tashlinsky District, Orenburg Oblast =

Rural locality in Orenburg Oblast, Russia

Coordinates: 51°46′09″N 52°44′27″E

Tashla (Russian: Ташла) is a rural locality (a selo) and the administrative center of Tashlinsky District, Orenburg Oblast, Russia. There has been three population censuses for Tashla. The first was in 1989 with a population of 5,585 (1989 Soviet census). The second in 2002 with a population of 6,688 (2002 census); And the third in 2010 with a population of 7,061 (2010 census);
