= Tashlinsky District =

Tashlinsky District Ташлинский район (Russian)
- District
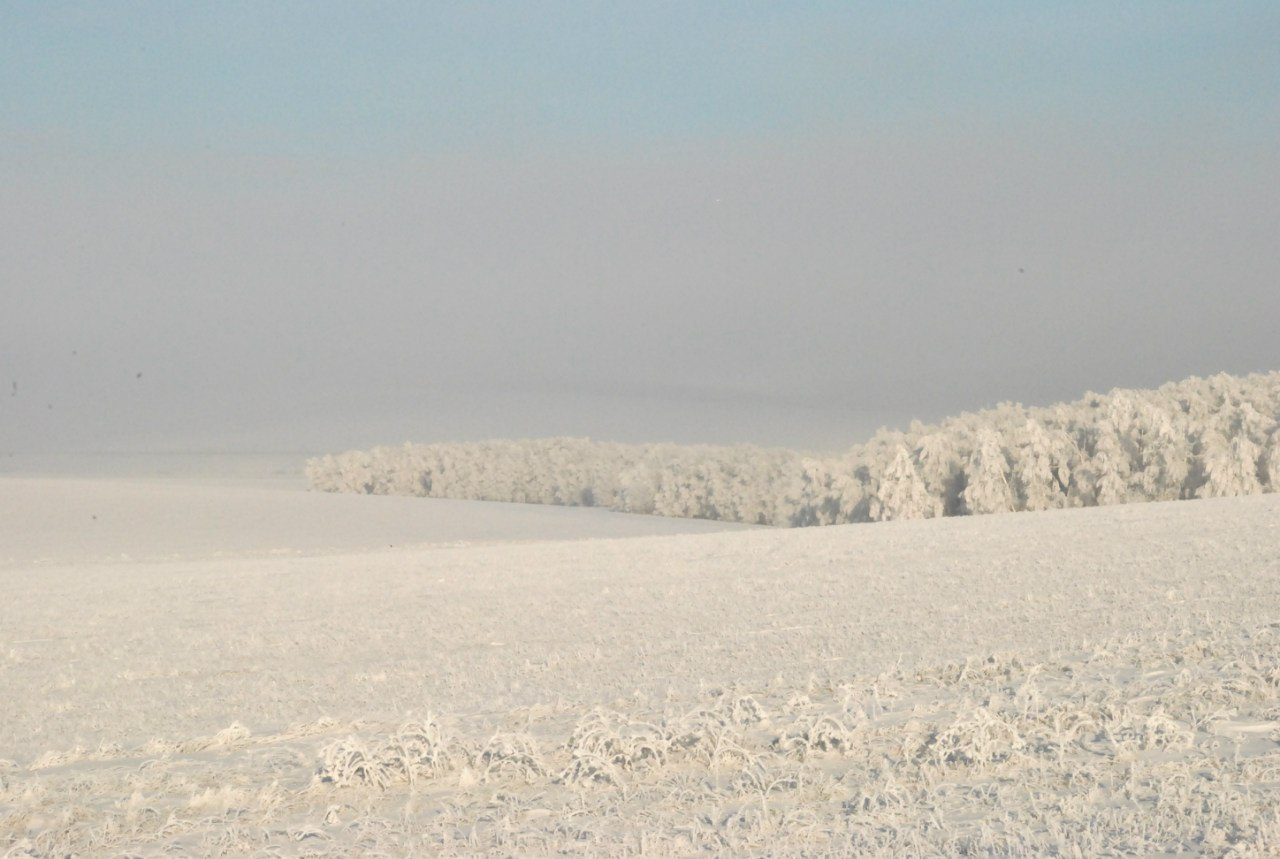
- Blagodarnovsky reserve, Tashlinsky District

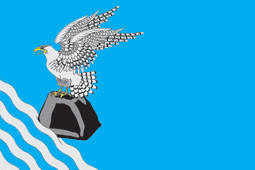
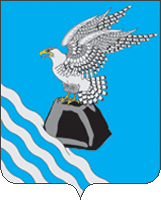
- Flag Coat of arms
- Location of Tashlinsky District in Orenburg Oblast
- Coordinates: 51°46′12″N 52°45′00″E
- Country: Russia
- Federal subject: Orenburg Oblast
- Administrative center: Tashla

Area
  - Total: 2,700 km^{2} (1,000 sq mi)

Population (2010 Census)
  - Total: 25,281
  - Density: 9.4/km^{2} (24/sq mi)
  - Urban: 0%
  - Rural: 100%

Administrative structure
  - Administrative divisions: 18 selsoviet
  - Inhabited localities: 44 rural localities

Municipal structure
  - Municipally incorporated as: Tashlinsky Municipal District
  - Municipal divisions: 0 urban settlements, 18 rural settlements
- Time zone: UTC+5 (MSK+2)
- OKTMO ID: 53651000
- Website: http://www.tl.orb.ru/

Tashlinsky District (Russian: Ташлинский райо́н; Kazakh: Ташла ауданы, Tashla aýdany) is an administrative and municipal district (raion), one of the thirty-five in Orenburg Oblast, Russia. It is located in the southwest of the oblast. The area of the district is 2,700 square kilometers (1,000 sq mi). Its administrative center is the rural locality (a selo) of Tashla. Population: 25,281 (2010 Census); 26,886 (2002 census); 23,084 (1989 Soviet census). The population of Tashla accounts for 27.9% of the district's total population.
