= Abdurakhmanov =

Abdurakhmanov is a surname. Among its spelling variants are Abdurakhmonov, Aburahmanov and Abdurahmonov. Notable people with the surname include:

== Abdurakhmanov ==
- Ilgar Abdurakhmanov (born 1979), Azerbaijani footballer
- Kanti Abdurakhmanov (1916–2000), Soviet World War II military officer and Chechen warlord
- Nabi Abdurakhmanov (born 1958), Uzbek theatre producer and director
- Odiljon Abdurakhmanov (born 1996), Kyrgyzstani footballer
- Odil Abdurakhmanov (born 1978), Uzbek politician
- Tumso Abdurakhmanov (born 1985), Chechen dissident

== Abdurakhmonov ==
- Bekzod Abdurakhmonov (born 1990), Uzbekistani freestyle wrestler and mixed martial artist
- Ibrokhim Abdurakhmonov (born 1975), Uzbek statesman and scientist
- Mukhamadmurod Abdurakhmonov (born 1986), Tajikistani judoka

== Abdurahmanov ==
- Fuad Abdurahmanov (1915–1971), Azerbaijani monument sculptor
- Ilgar Abdurahmanov (born 1979), Azerbaijani footballer
- Salijon Abdurahmanov (born 1950), Uzbek journalist

== Abdurahmonov ==
- Sherzod Abdurahmonov (born 1982), Uzbekistani boxer
