= Nabi =

Nabi may refer to:

== People ==
=== Given name ===
- Nabi Abdurakhmanov (born 1958), Uzbek theatre producer and director
- Nabi Avcı (born 1953), Turkish academic and politician
- Nabi Bakhsh Baloch (1917–2011), Pakistani Baloch historian
- Nabi Bux Khan Bhutto (1887–1965), Pakistani lawyer
- Nabi Chowdhury (1934–2003), Bangladeshi footballer player
- Nabi Gul (born 1998), Pakistani cricketer
- Nabi Khanyari, Kashmiri historian
- Nabi Khazri (1924–2007), Azerbaijani poet
- Nabi Misdaq, Afghan author
- Nabi Rahimov (1911–1994), Uzbek and Soviet stage and film actor
- Nabi Saleh (businessman), Iranian Australian businessman
- Nabi Şensoy (1945–2018) Turkish diplomat
- Nabi Sorouri (1933–2002), Iranian wrestler
- Nabi Tajima (1900–2018), Japanese supercentenarian and last living person born in the 19th century

=== Surname ===
- Adil Nabi (born 1994), Pakistani footballer
- Auqib Nabi (born 1996), Indian cricketer
- Heiki Nabi (born 1985), Estonian wrestler
- Isadore Nabi, satirical pseudonym of Richard Levins and Richard Lewontin, scientists in the 1960s
- Mohammad Nabi (born 1985), Afghan cricketer
- Rahis Nabi (born 1999), Pakistani footballer
- Samir Nabi (born 1997), Pakistani footballer
- Yusuf Nabi (1642–1712), Turkish poet
- Ghulam Nabi Khan (1890–1932), Afghan ambassador

== Acronym ==
- Native American Bahá'í Institute, a Regional Bahá'í Training Institute in Burntwater, Arizona, United States
- North American Bus Industries, a bus manufacturing company based in Alabama, United States

== Other uses ==
- Nabi (film), a 2001 South Korean film
- Nabi, Iran, a village in Khuzestan Province, Iran
- Nabi language, a Torricelli language of Papua New Guinea
- Typhoon Nabi, a 2005 super typhoon
- Prophets of Islam, humans who, in the Islamic faith, have been chosen as prophets by God
- The Korean-language title of Mr. Butterfly, a 2003 South Korean film
- An input method for UNIX platforms
- A character in the Korean animation There She Is!!
- A line of tablets manufactured by Fuhu

== See also ==
- Nabis (disambiguation)
- Navi (disambiguation)
- Nebi (disambiguation)
