= Ramzan Kadyrov =

Head of Chechen Republic since 2007

- Рамзан Кадыров; Рамзан КъадиргӀеран
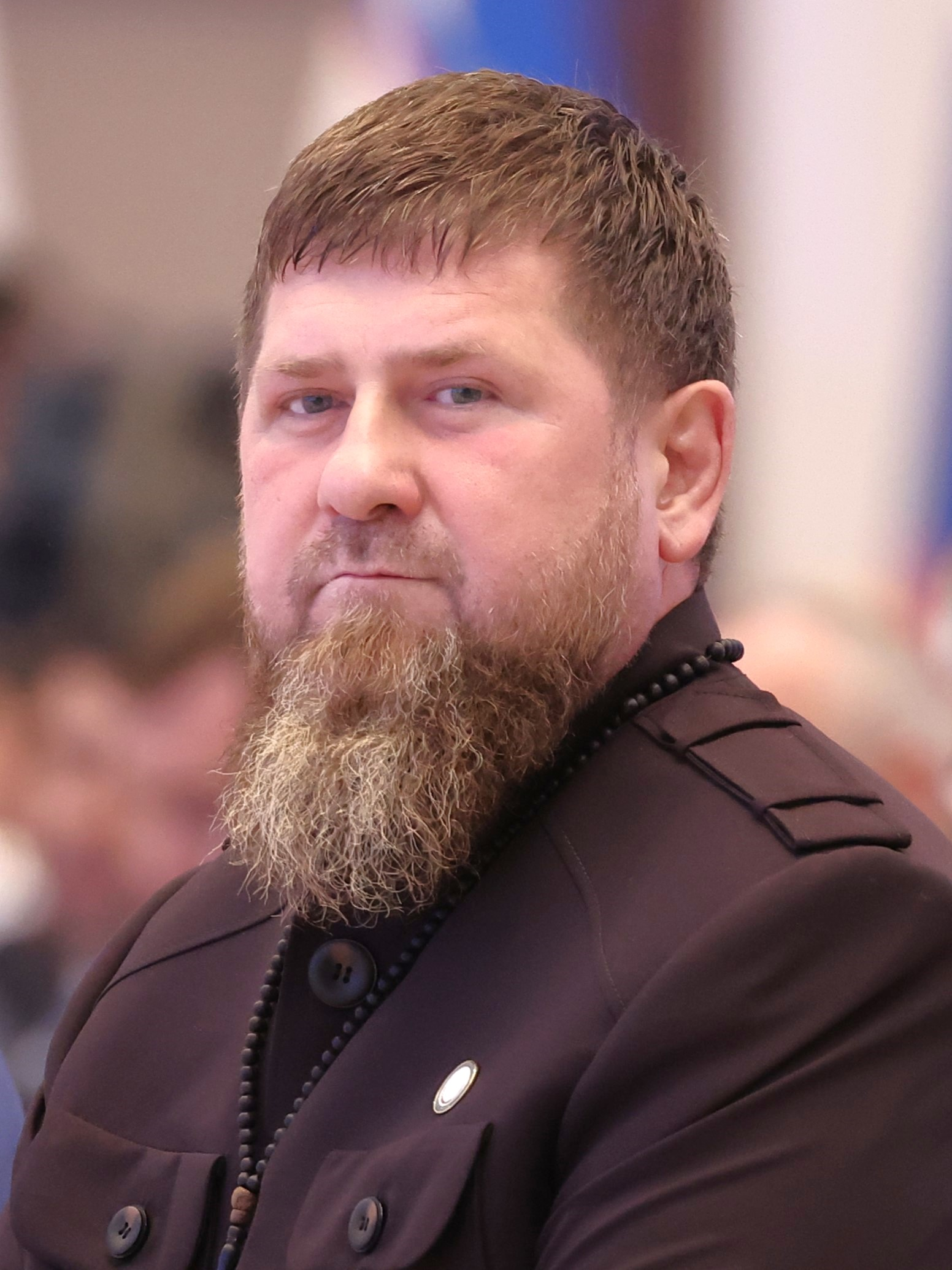
- Kadyrov in 2024

Head of the Chechen Republic (Note: Titled "President of the Chechen Republic" until April 2011)
- Incumbent
- Assumed office 15 February 2007
- Prime Minister: Odes Baysultanov; Ruslan Edelgeriev; Muslim Khuchiev; Isa Tumkhadzhiev (acting); Magomed Daudov
- Preceded by: Alu Alkhanov

Prime Minister of the Chechen Republic
- In office 18 November 2005 – 10 April 2007
- Preceded by: Sergey Abramov
- Succeeded by: Odes Baysultanov

First Deputy Prime Minister of the Chechen Republic
- In office 10 May 2004 – 18 November 2005
- Preceded by: Eli Isayev
- Succeeded by: Odes Baysultanov

Personal details
- Born: Ramzan Akhmatovich Kadyrov; 5 October 1976 (age 50) Tsentaroy, Checheno-Ingush ASSR, Russian SFSR, Soviet Union
- Party: United Russia
- Spouses: Medni Musaevna Kadyrova (m. 1996): Fatima Khazuyeva; Aminat Akhmadova
- Children: 12 (6 sons (2 adopted), 6 daughters)
- Parents: Akhmad Kadyrov (father); Aimani Kadyrova (mother)
- Education: Makhachkala Institute of Business and Law; Dagestan State Technical University; Dagestan State University
- Profession: Politician; military officer
- Awards

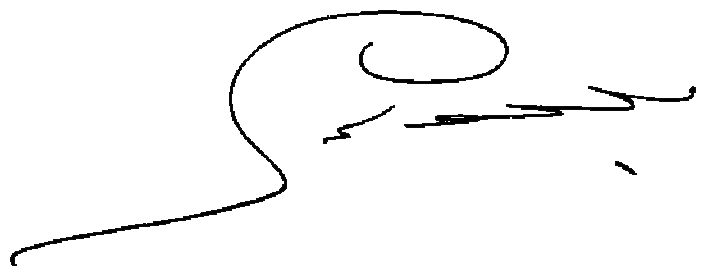
- Signature
- Nickname: Lyulya

Military service
- Allegiance: Chechen Republic of Ichkeria (1996–2000); Russia (since 2000)
- Branch/service: Ministry of Internal Affairs (2004–2016); Kadyrovites; National Guard of Russia (since 2016); Kadyrovites
- Years of service: 1999–present
- Rank: General of the Army
- Battles/wars: First Chechen War; Second Chechen War: Russo-Ukrainian war; Russian invasion of Ukraine; Wagner Group rebellion

Ramzan Akhmatovich Kadyrov (Note: Russian: Рамзан Ахматович Кадыров, IPA: [rɐˈmzan ɐxˈmatəvʲɪtɕ kɐˈdɨrəf] Chechen: КъадиргӀеран Ахьмад-Хьаьжин Рамзан) (born 5 October 1976) is a Russian politician who serves as the head of the Chechen Republic. He was formerly affiliated with the Chechen independence movement through his father, who was the separatist-appointed mufti of Chechnya. He is an army general in the Russian military.

Kadyrov is the son of former Chechen president Akhmad Kadyrov, who switched sides in the Second Chechen War by offering his service to Vladimir Putin's administration in Russia and became Chechen president in 2003. Akhmad Kadyrov was assassinated in May 2004. In February 2007, Ramzan Kadyrov replaced Alu Alkhanov as president, shortly after he had turned 30, which is the minimum age for the post. He was engaged in violent power struggles with Chechen commanders Sulim Yamadayev (d. 2009) and Said-Magomed Kakiyev for overall military authority, and with Alkhanov for political authority. Since November 2015, he has been a member of the Advisory Commission of the State Council of the Russian Federation.

Kadyrov rules the Chechen Republic through totalitarianism and repression. Over the years, he has come under criticism from international organizations for a wide array of human rights abuses under his government, with Human Rights Watch calling the forced disappearances and torture so widespread that they constituted crimes against humanity. During his tenure, he has advocated restricting the public lives of women, and led anti-gay purges in the Republic. Kadyrov has been frequently accused of involvement in the kidnapping, assassination, and torture of human rights activists, critics, and their relatives, within both Chechnya and other regions of the Russian Federation, as well as abroad, through the political use of police and military forces. He publicly denies these accusations.

Kadyrov has attempted to portray a hypermasculine image in public, frequently posing with guns and military garb or displaying his wealth and opulence. The Kadyrov family has enriched itself considerably during its rule of the Chechen Republic; the Russian Federation dispenses extensive funding to the Chechen government, while the distinction between the Chechen government and Kadyrov is blurry.

== Early life ==
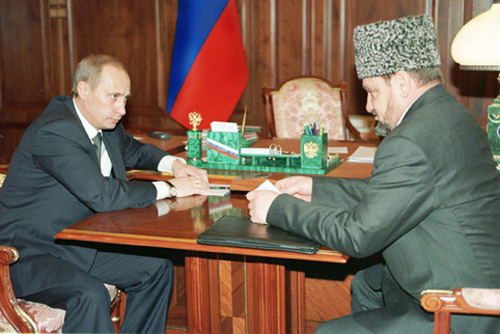
Akhmad Kadyrov, father of Ramzan and formerly a leading separatist mufti, had switched sides in 2000

Kadyrov was born in Tsentaroy, in the Checheno-Ingush ASSR, in the Russian SFSR, part of the Soviet Union. He was the second son in Akhmad and Aimani Kadyrov's family and their youngest child. He had an elder brother named Zelimkhan (1974–31 May 2004), and he has two elder sisters, Zargan (born 1971) and Zulay (born 1972).

The Q'adarġeran neqe, correspondent to the Kadyrov family in Chechen kinship, belongs to the Benoy teip. Although the Benoy were among the wealthiest of the Chechen teips, their prolonged resistance to annexation by the Russian Empire was met with forced resettlement during the last years of the Caucasian War.

Kadyrov strove to gain the respect of his father, Akhmad Kadyrov, who was an imam. He claims that he always emulated his father. In the early 1990s, as the Soviet Union dissolved, the Chechens launched a bid for independence. Akhmad had supported the call for jihad against Russians during the First Chechen War but switched sides and declared allegiance to Russia in the Second Chechen War.

During the First Chechen War, together with his father, Ramzan Kadyrov fought against Russian armed forces. After the war, Ramzan was the personal driver and bodyguard of his father Akhmad, who became the separatist mufti of Chechnya. The Kadyrovite militia was formed during the First Chechen War, when Akhmad Kadyrov declared jihad against Russia. The family defected to the Russian side at the beginning of the Second Chechen War in 1999. Since then, Kadyrov led his militia with support from Russia's Federal Security Service (FSB), including the provision of service ID cards, becoming the head of the Chechen Presidential Security Service. The militia later became known as the Kadyrovites.

=== Nickname ===
In Chechen society, Kadyrov is widely known under the nickname "Lyulya". There are claims that this is Kadyrov's childhood nickname.

== Political career ==
=== Deputy Prime Minister ===
After his father, the then President, was assassinated on 9 May 2004, Ramzan was appointed as the First Deputy Prime Minister of the Chechen Republic on 10 May 2004.

When his sister was detained by the Dagestan police in January 2005, Kadyrov and some 150 armed men drove to the Khasavyurt City Police (GOVD) building. According to the city mayor, Kadyrov's men surrounded the GOVD, forcing its duty officers against a wall, and assaulted them, after which they left the building with Zulay Kadyrova, "victoriously shooting in the air."

In August 2005, Kadyrov declared that "Europe's largest mosque" would be built in place of the demolished ruins of Grozny's shattered downtown. He also claimed that Chechnya is the "most peaceful place in Russia" and in a few years it would also be "the wealthiest and the most peaceful" place in the world. He said that the war was already over with only 150 "bandits" remaining (as opposed to the official figures of 700 to 2,000 rebel fighters), and that thanks to his father, 7,000 separatists had already defected to the Russian side since 1999. When responding to a question on how he is going to "avenge the murder of his father", Kadyrov said:

I've already killed him, whom I ought to kill. And those, who stay behind him, I will be killing them, to the very last of them, until I am myself killed or jailed. I will be killing [them] for as long as I live... Putin is gorgeous. He thinks more about Chechnya than about any other republic [of the Russian Federation]. When my father was murdered, he [Putin] came and went to the cemetery in person. Putin has stopped the war. Putin should be made president for life. Strong rule is needed. Democracy is all but an American fabrication... Russians never obey their laws. Everyone was stealing, and only Khodorkovsky is in jail.

He remained the First Deputy Prime Minister until November 2005.

=== Acting Prime Minister ===
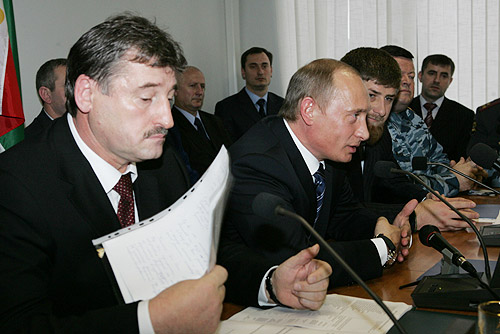
Left to right: President Alu Alkhanov, Russian president Putin, and Kadyrov at the Chechen Parliament's first session, December 2005.

Following a car accident in November 2005, in which Chechnya's prime minister Sergey Abramov was injured, Kadyrov was appointed as the caretaker prime minister on 18 November 2005. He immediately proceeded to implement elements of Sharia law, such as declaring a ban on gambling and alcohol production.

In February 2006, responding to the publication of the Mohammed cartoons, he accused the Danes of "spying" and being "pro-terrorist". He also banned Danish citizens from entering Chechnya, effectively banning activity of the Danish Refugee Council, the largest non-governmental organisation working in the region. Kadyrov is quoted as saying, "That cartoonist needs to be buried alive." He was eventually pressed to overturn this decision by Moscow, a rare example of federal intervention in Kadyrov's rule in the republic.

=== Prime minister ===
On 1 March 2006, Sergey Abramov resigned from the position of prime minister and told Itar-Tass news agency that he did so "on the condition that Ramzan Kadyrov lead the Chechen government." This was followed by a decree of Kadyrov forcing women to wear headscarves; he also rejected a federal appropriation of the republic's budget, demanding more money, and called for all federal forces but the border guards to be withdrawn.

Kadyrov was appointed as the prime minister of the Chechen Republic by Alkhanov on 4 March 2006. Shortly after taking office, Kadyrov approved a project to erect a presidential palace on a 30-acre (120,000 m^{2}) plot by the Sunzha River in ruined downtown Grozny. The project, which was also to include a five-star hotel and recreational facilities, was estimated to cost around 1.5 billion roubles ($54 million USD) to build.

Later, Kadyrov called for refugee camps scattered across Chechnya to be closed down, calling the refugees "international spies who are interested in stoking conflict between Chechnya and Russia, who are seeking to destabilise the situation in our region". Reuters quoted him as saying that "liquidating the refugee camps will allow us to uncover spies who are working for foreign intelligence services". His cousin Odes Baysultanov was appointed to the position of First Deputy Prime Minister by Alkhanov on 6 March 2006 after being unanimously approved by the Chechen Parliament.

On 5 June 2006, Speaker of the Chechen People's Assembly Dukvakha Abdurakhmanov said at a press conference in Moscow that "there is no alternative" to Kadyrov for the presidency; Kadyrov has "exclusive awards in combat, and has made achievements in improving the peaceful life and in human rights protection. Who could replace him at this stage? Nobody," he said. Later that year, Umar Dzhabrailov, Chechnya's representative in the Federation Council and a close ally of Kadyrov's, urged Dukvakha Abdurakhmanov to initiate a measure calling on Kadyrov to become the republic's president, thereby replacing Alu Alkhanov.

The following week, several Russian newspapers reported that a worsening security situation in Chechnya was lessening the likelihood that Kadyrov would replace Alu Alkhanov as the republic's president. Other media, however, reported that Kadyrov continued to strengthen his position at Alkhanov's expense. He was also elected as the Chair of the Chechen Peoples' Assembly in late-October 2006.

On 6 December 2006, Kadyrov said that he would seek the prosecution of the commanders of federal military units responsible for the death or disappearance of civilians in Chechnya (specifically Major General Aleksandr Studenikin). In addition, Kadyrov said the war in Chechnya was unleashed not by the Chechen people but by the Russian leadership. Kadyrov's comments may have represented his government's increasing unhappiness with certain figures in Moscow, who were said to be blocking his elevation to the post of Chechen president. In 2006, leaked cables from an American diplomat recounted a lavish wedding attended by Kadyrov in Russia's Caucasus region in which guests threw $100 bills at child dancers, and which had nighttime "water-scooter jaunts on the Caspian Sea", and a report that Kadyrov gave the newly married couple a "five-kilo lump of gold".

On 5 February 2007, Kadyrov said he did not aspire to become the Chechen president; however, he criticised Alkhanov. Kadyrov also claimed the war in Chechnya was ultimately finished, with "all informal armed groups eliminated". Alkhanov, for his part, criticised "the cult of personality and idealisation of one person", a clear reference to Kadyrov, whose enormous portraits are prominently displayed in Grozny.

=== President of the Chechen Republic ===
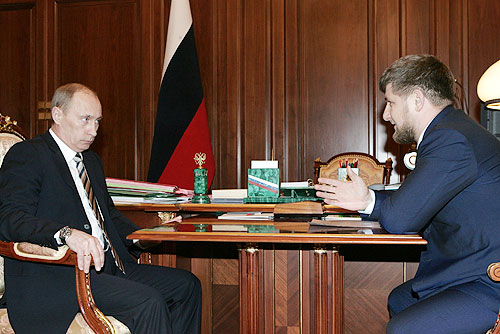
Kadyrov (right) with Russian president Vladimir Putin in February 2008

On 15 February 2007, Putin signed a decree removing Alkhanov and installing Kadyrov as Chechen's acting president. On 2 March 2007, following Putin's nomination of Kadyrov as Chechen president, the Chechen parliament approved the nomination. In the following days, serious changes took place in the administrative setup of the republic, affecting both the top- and middle-ranking officials. Former deputy prime minister Odes Baysultanov (a cousin of Kadyrov) was elevated to the vacant post of prime minister. Critics allege that Kadyrov is actively building his own "vertical of power" in the republic, and encouraging nepotism by placing men of his own family (Kadyrov) in all the leading and important positions.

A Russian daily, Gazeta, reported that according to a poll conducted by the independent Levada Center, only 33 percent of Russians believe that Kadyrov can be trusted, while 35 percent believed that he cannot. Asked whether they thought Kadyrov could normalise the situation in Chechnya and end the bloodshed there, 31 percent said yes and 38 percent said no.

On 14 March 2007, Kadyrov said that human rights abuses were "a thing of the past" in his republic, rejecting new charges of torture made by the Council of Europe. Two days later he accused the federal authorities of torturing detainees. On 19 March 2007, Kadyrov vowed to put an end to all remaining guerilla activity in Chechnya within two months. On 5 April 2007, Kadyrov was sworn in as President of Chechnya. He appointed his maternal cousin Odes Baysultanov as the prime minister of the republic on 10 April.

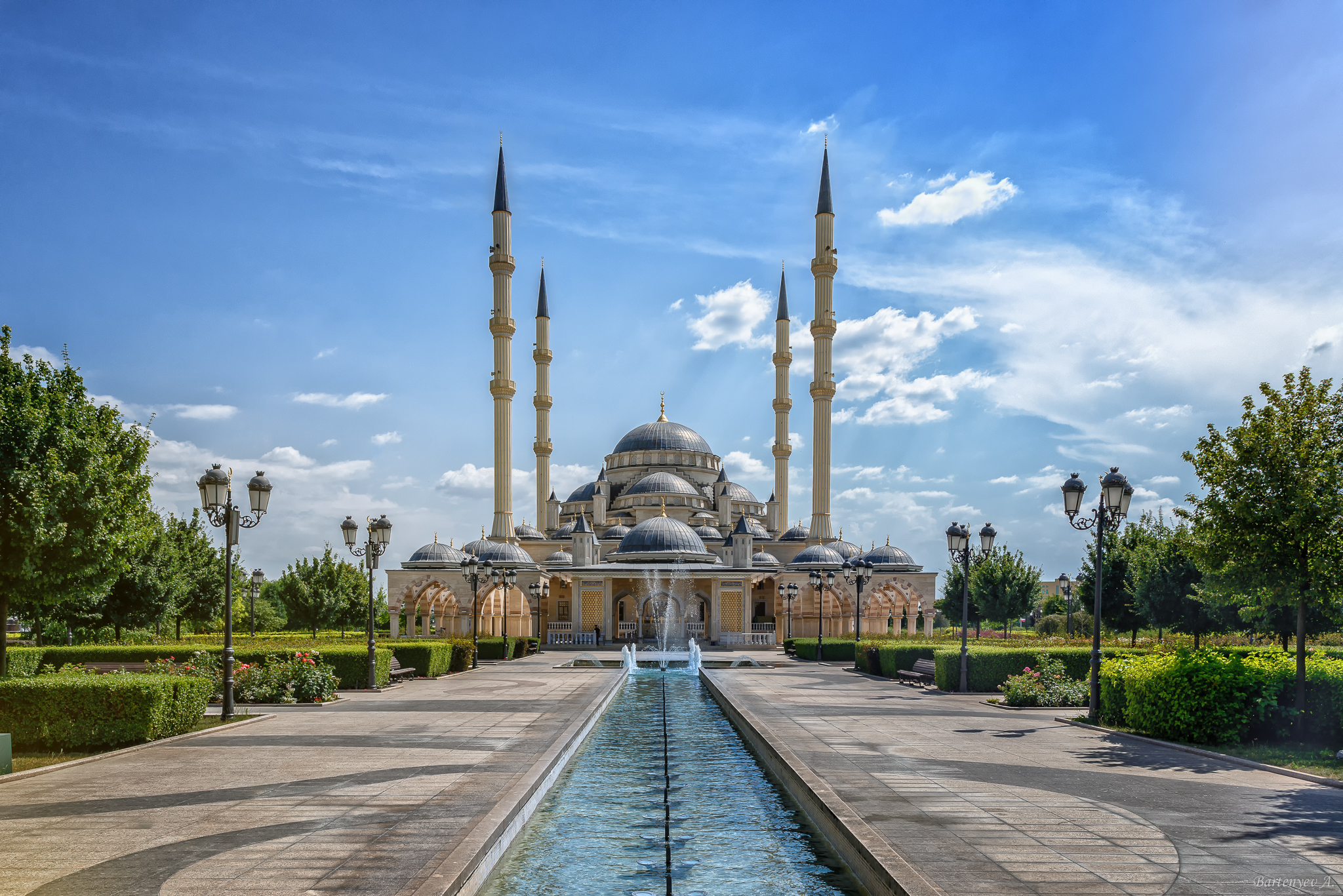
The Akhmad Kadyrov Mosque was completed in 2008

After the car-bomb attack on Yunus-bek Yevkurov, president of the neighbouring Republic of Ingushetia on 22 June 2009, Kadyrov claimed that the Kremlin had ordered him to fight insurgents there, and during his subsequent visit to the republic on 24 June pledged ruthless vengeance.

In late December 2009, Kadyrov claimed that remaining rebels were getting financed by "The West"; "I officially declare this: those who destroyed the Soviet Union, those who want to destroy the Russian Federation, they stand behind them". He also suggested that Russia should attack Georgia and Ukraine "It's Russia's private affliction; why should we always suffer if we can eradicate this for good?". In early August 2010, Kadyrov had claimed that there were only 70 Islamist militants left in Chechnya.

In the same month, he proposed changing the title of President of the Chechen Republic to Head of the Chechen Republic. On 12 August, he also called upon presidents of all North Caucasus republics to petition the State Duma to change their titles, stating that there should only be one president in Russia. The Chechen parliament unanimously approved this change on 2 September. However, Speaker of the Chechen Parliament Dukvakha Abdurakhmanov stated on 4 September that the title will be retained until the end of Kadyrov's term in April 2011.

In February 2011, he invited the players of Brazil's 2002 FIFA World Cup winning team to play a match against a Chechen football team led by Kadyrov. The Brazilian team was named as Brazil XI. In addition, Ruud Gullit was hired by Kadyrov to train FC Terek Grozny.

==== Attempted assassination ====
An assassination attempt on Kadyrov and a parliament member Adam Delimkhanov was thwarted on 23 October 2009 by the police. Chechen Deputy interior minister Roman Edilov said the police shot dead the driver of a speeding car loaded with a 200-litre tank after firing warning shots shortly before Kadyrov was to arrive at a construction site. The driver of the car was later identified as a militant leader (so-called Urus-Martan emir Beslan Bashtayev).

Said-Emi Khizriev, who played a role in organising the attack, was killed by Russian police who tried to arrest him in the Michurin village in Grozny. Khizriev planned and took part in explosions at two gas stations in Gudermes in the spring of the previous year, as well as in an armed attack at a sport club in the city.

==== Attempts at consolidation of the Chechen nation ====
As reported by the Caucasian Knot, an independent human rights resource, on 5 February 2009, "in the course of his meeting in Grozny with Ramzan Ampukaev, representative of the Chechen Diaspora in Europe, Ramzan Kadyrov invited former militants, now living in Europe, to come back home":

"Now, the situation in the republic has stabilized, we witness a steady economic growth, and there's no sense for people to leave. And those who are already abroad, can always come back. We'll help them in every possible way," said Mr. Kadyrov. "All sorts of Emirs and former participants of illegal armed formations, who are now in Europe and whose actions were not aggravated by bloody crimes, have two alternatives: either to come back and serve for the welfare of their homeland, or stay there until the end of their days."

==== Tsentoroy and Chechen Parliament attacks ====
In 2010, two large scale attacks were carried out by Chechen insurgents, one in Kadyrov's home-village Tsentoroy and the other on Chechen Parliament in Grozny. The assault on Tsentoroy which occurred on 29 August is considered to have "shattered" the image of Kadyrov's unshakeable rule in Chechnya, as it was the first time in six years that his seemingly impregnable village had come under attack.

On 2 September, Kadyrov announced a reward of more than $300,000 for information about each of the insurgency leaders involved in the operation, which Chechen commentators interpreted as an indicator of the government's weakness. Kadyrov also tightened his control over information coming from Tsentoroy by not allowing any of the village's 5,000 inhabitants to leave in the days after the attack. The citizenry were also allegedly under the threat of death not to talk about the siege or the damage inflicted by the rebels.

The attack on the Chechen parliament was carried out by three Chechen rebels on 19 October 2010. Kadyrov, dressed in a parade uniform, attended a meeting that was held a few hours after all the buildings of the parliament were declared cleared by the special forces. During the meeting, he apologised to the politicians who escaped unhurt from the attack. Kadyrov vowed to intensify the fight against militants in the republic, calling them "bandits". He also blamed the United Kingdom and Poland saying they were "harbouring criminals. Why do they shield bandits who have shed blood where there is western democracy? Where is the justice? ... Sooner or later Zakayev, Gakayev, Umarov, Vadalov and other criminals will get what they deserve ... I have no doubt that it was the drunk and alcoholic Akhmed Zakayev and his backers in London and other western capitals. I want to say that they will not achieve anything. The Chechen republic is still standing. It is a peaceful and stable region."

=== Head of the Chechen Republic ===
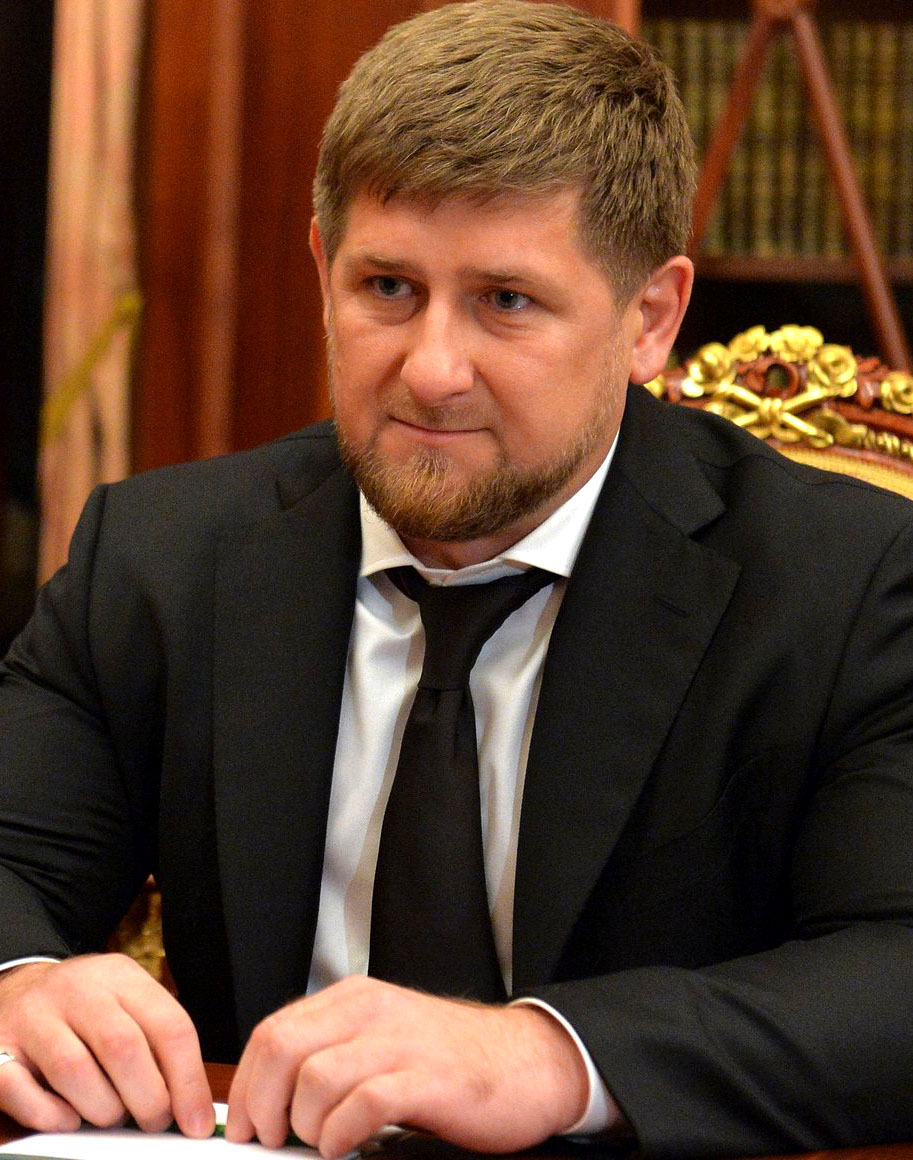
Kadyrov in 2014

Kadyrov was nominated to a second term as president (now referred to as Head of the Chechen Republic) by Russian president Dmitry Medvedev on 28 February 2011 and was unanimously elected for a second term by the Chechen Parliament on 5 March 2011. After his election, he stated that he was going to continue the current course of reviving the republic's economy and society.

On 8 March, he captained a Chechen football team which included current players of FC Terek Grozny, former players of Soviet Union national football team and former German midfielder Lothar Matthaeus in a match against the team Brazil XI which included ex-Brazilian footballers like Romario, Dunga, Bebeto and Cafu. Kadyrov scored twice during the match but his team lost 6–4 to the Brazilian side. Kadyrov said that he had organised the match to show that Chechnya had recovered from years of separatist conflict. He also said that the Brazilians weren't paid to appear but came out of goodwill and in return for a donation to flood victims in Brazil.

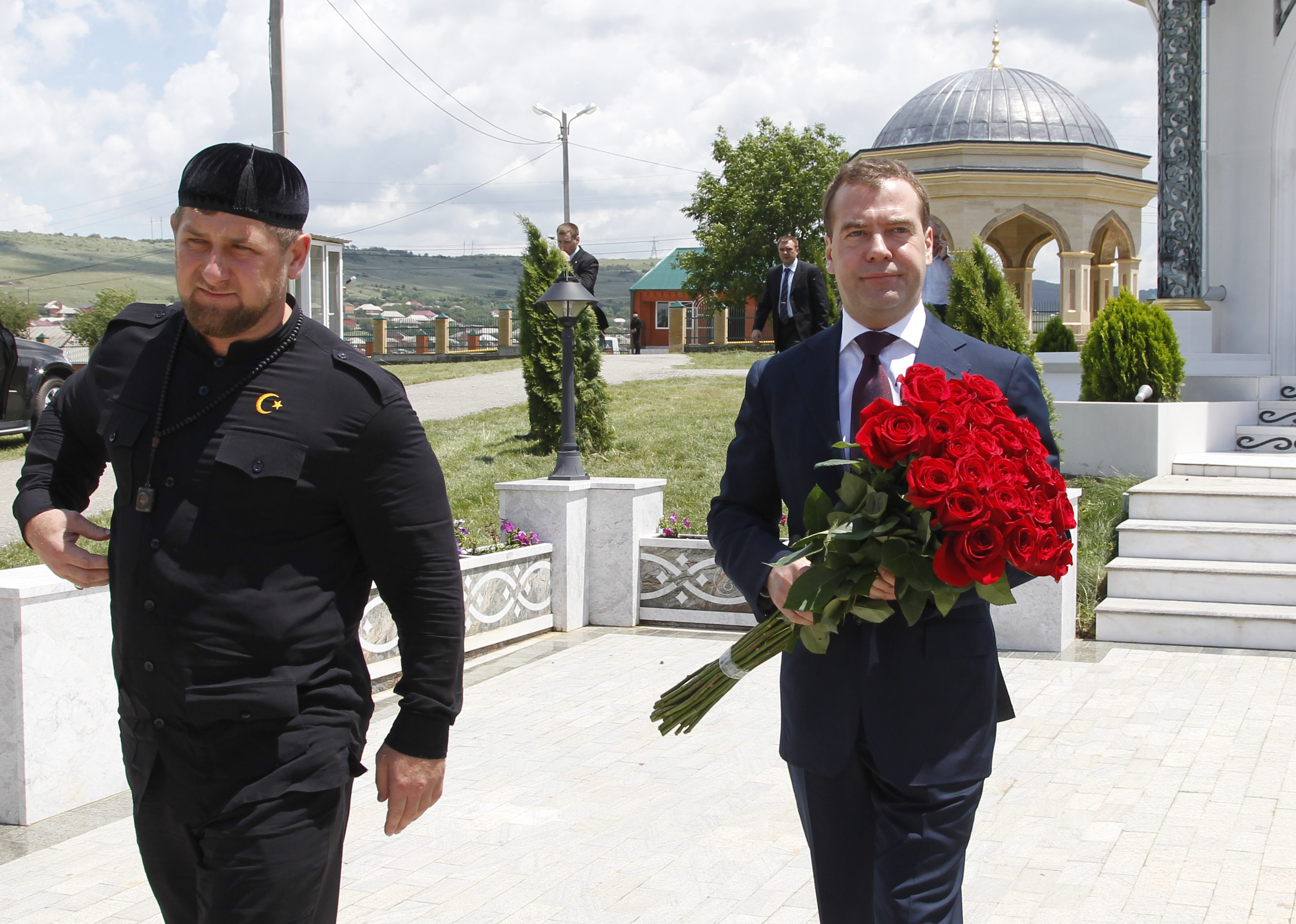
Russian prime minister Dmitry Medvedev and Kadyrov at the grave of the first president of Chechnya Akhmad Kadyrov in June 2012

Kadyrov was sworn in as head of the republic on 5 April 2011. In November 2012, he visited Azerbaijan to sign intergovernmental agreements. In December 2012, he ordered the closure of the newspaper Kadyrov's Path after one of its reporters asked Putin a question about the violence once focused in Chechnya spreading to other republics and followed it up by asking about the fate of a local radio station. Kadyrov had reportedly taken a disliking to the question asked by the reporter to Putin.

Kadyrov termed former president of Ukraine Viktor Yanukovych's ousting as a "coup d'état" and a deliberate attempt to exert pressure on Russia through Ukraine, however at the same time placed the blame on Yanukovych for the situation in Ukraine. On 28 February 2014, he affirmed his readiness to dispatch peacekeepers and a consignment of humanitarian aid to Crimea.

After the 2014 Grozny bombing, in which ISIL's hand was suspected, he said that he might block internet in Chechnya as anyone could easily find and listen to a sermon by a jihadist. After Kadyrov went on a tirade against ISIL on Instagram for threatening Russia, ISIL commander Omar al-Shishani put a $5 million bounty on him.

On 26 May 2015, he announced that he was going to star in a Hollywood thriller titled Whoever Doesn't Understand Will Get It which will be directed by a director of famous Hollywood films and also feature global film-stars. Kadyrov in July 2015 denied that ISIL had any territory in Chechnya and claimed that they never will. During an interview in October 2015, he suggested that Putin should send Chechen special forces to Syria claiming they will wipe out ISIL in weeks. On 3 December, he promised revenge against ISIL for beheading of Khasiev. On 8 February 2016, he claimed that Chechen special forces had infiltrated ISIL cells.

Kadyrov announced on 27 February 2016 that he would step down at the end of his second term, which was set to expire on 5 April. However, he later decided to run in the elections that were to be held that September. Putin appointed him as the acting head of Chechnya until the elections in a decree signed on 25 March.

Kadyrov launched his reality show titled The Team with the first episode being aired by Channel One on 30 June. People from across Russia were invited by Kadyrov to register for the contest. The winner of the contest will go on to become head of Chechnya's Agency for Strategic Development.

On 18 September 2016, Kadyrov was re-elected with nearly 98% of the vote. Philip Varychenko, a native of Düsseldorf, was chosen as the winner of Kadyrov's reality show on 22 November and was appointed as a government aide. Kadyrov visited Saudi Arabia on 27 November where he met the Deputy Crown Prince Mohammad bin Salman. During the meeting, they discussed Russia–Saudi Arabia relations as well as issues of common interest. He also visited the United Arab Emirates on the same day and met Mohammed bin Zayed Al Nahyan, the Crown Prince of Abu Dhabi. The two discussed friendship, cooperation and strengthening ties. During his visits, he praised King Salman of Saudi Arabia for his "leadership of the Muslim world and efforts to combat extremism".

On 28 November, he stated that veterans of American special forces would not be allowed to train security and intelligence personnel at a "tactical city" in Gudermes because "they weren't as good as Russian special forces and there were sanctions against all official structures from the United States." On 29 November, he claimed in an interview with Asharq Al-Awsat that only a few dozen Chechens were fighting with ISIL, adding that most of them grew up in Western Europe. He also stated that measures taken by Chechen authorities had been successful in bringing back many young recruits before they reached Syria.

During an interview aired on 27 November 2017, Kadyrov stated that he was ready to resign as Head of the Chechen Republic, calling it his "dream" as he found the responsibility to be "too heavy". He announced on 5 December that no Chechen athletes will participate under a neutral flag at the 2018 Winter Olympics.

After an attack on the Church of Archangel Michael in Grozny on 19 May 2018, Kadyrov stated that he had personally overseen the operation to eliminate the attackers. On 26 September, he signed an agreement with Yunus-bek Yevkurov, the Head of Ingushetia, resolving the border dispute between the two Russian republics. The agreement seen as grossly unfair to Ingushestia ignited widespread protests eventually leading to resignation of Yevkurov on 24 June 2019.

Kadyrov was given the rank of major general in July 2020, through an executive order of the Russian president. He added on his blog that he had been transferred from Ministry of Internal Affairs to the National Guard of Russia.

==== COVID-19 pandemic ====
During the COVID-19 pandemic in Russia, Kadyrov initially in March 2020 dismissed the spread of the disease as nothing serious. Later, Chechnya imposed strict measures to curb the spread of coronavirus after it first emerged in the republic. In an interview to Caucasian Knot, Kadyrov purportedly stated that infected people violating self-quarantine should be killed. People accused of spreading rumors have also been forced to admit their guilt and apologize on live television broadcasts by Kadyrov, though human rights organizations have claimed they were pressured.

In April 2020, Kadyrov announced imposition of even stricter measures in Chechnya to curb the spread of the coronavirus. In addition to a night curfew, the government also sealed off all transportation to regions outside the republic. Kadyrov meanwhile also denied that force was being used against those who defied the restrictions. After the Russian prime minister Mikhail Mishustin criticized heads of Russian regions for overstepping the extent of their powers with the restrictions they imposed, Kadyrov commented that while he did not know if Mishustin referred to Chechnya, goods as well as entry into the republic were not barred. However, entry of non-Chechens into the republic would be banned to curb the spread of the disease.

On 15 May 2020, Kadyrov in a live broadcast on the state-run Grozny TV stated that medical workers protesting over lack of personal protective equipment (PPE) must be sacked after one such protest occurred in Gudermes, claiming the republic had enough PPE.

==== Russian invasion of Ukraine ====
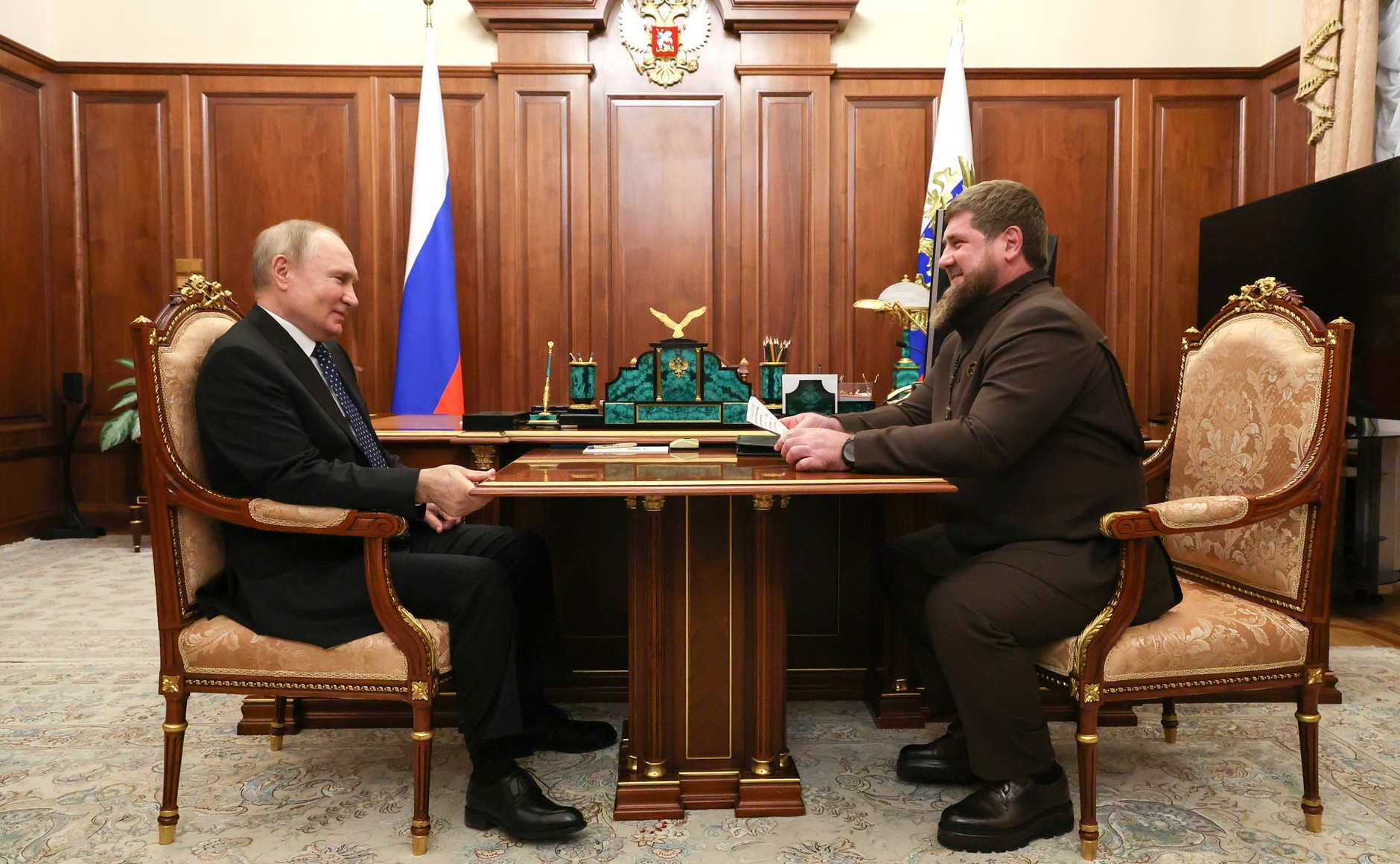
Kadyrov (right) with Russian president Vladimir Putin in March 2023

During the 2022 Russian invasion of Ukraine, Kadyrov was reported to have been taking part in Russian operations outside Kyiv. In a video he posted on Telegram, he called on Ukrainian forces to surrender "or you will be finished". Kremlin spokesperson Dmitry Peskov said the Kremlin had no information about whether Kadyrov was in Ukraine. The Telegraph reported that on two occasions when Kadyrov had said he was in Ukraine, he was proven not to be. In one instance, he said he was in Mariupol at a petrol station and published a photo, but the brand shown in the background, Rosneft's Pulsar, did not operate in Ukraine. On another occasion, Kadyrov posted a video suggesting he was meeting troops in Mariupol, but he hosted a Russian official in Grozny on the same day.

On 28 March 2022, President Putin promoted Kadyrov to the rank of lieutenant general. On 26 May, Kadyrov threatened Poland. He was apparently upset by the Polish supply of weapons to Ukraine. On 10 September, upset by the withdrawal of Russian troops in Izium, he called for the declaration of martial law and full military mobilization in Russia. On 22 September, he stated that the 2022 Russian mobilization would not be implemented in the Chechen Republic.

On 1 October 2022, Kadyrov called on Russia to use low-yield nuclear weapons in Ukraine, in response to Russia losing the important Ukrainian town of Lyman. Two days later, he announced he was deploying three underage sons, aged 14, 15, and 16, as child soldiers to the front line in Ukraine, a possible war crime. On 5 October, he announced that President Putin had promoted him from lieutenant general to the rank of colonel general.

In February 2023, a close ally of Kadyrov, General Apti Alaudinov was reportedly poisoned by a letter laced with toxin. Radio Free Europe/Radio Liberty in May 2024 cited Russian opposition sources as stating that Alaudinov had gained a positive reputation within the federal government after helping integrate many former Wagner Group members into the 141st Motorized Regiment following their rebellion, and was favored as a successor to Kadyrov by the defense establishment amid rumors about his ill health.

Although both Kadyrov and the Wagner Group leader Yevgeny Prigozhin supported each other in verbally attacking the Russian defense establishment during the Ukraine invasion, the Kadyrovites supported the Russian government during the Wagner Group rebellion in June 2023 with Kadyrov accusing Prigozhin of backstabbing. The Kadyrovites however did not engage the Wagner Group, and in August 2023, Kadyrov praised the legacy of Prigozhin. Russian opposition leader Dmitry Gudkov then warned that Kadyrov might suffer the same fate as Prigozhin.

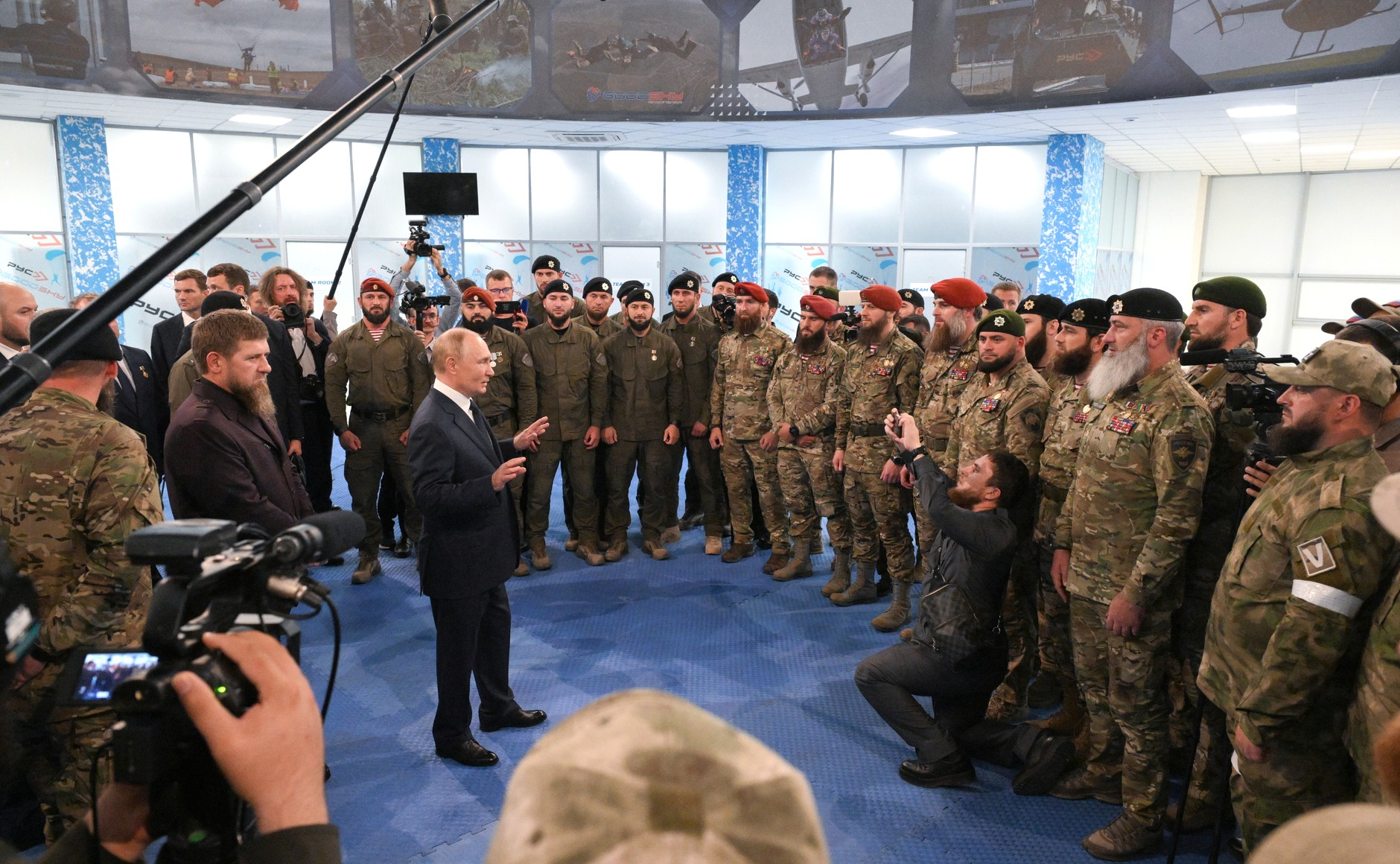
Kadyrov and Putin with Chechen commanders and volunteers in Gudermes, 20 August 2024

Kadyrov stated in May 2023 that Chechnya had sent over 26,000 soldiers, including 12,000 volunteers, to Ukraine, with 7,000 of them taking part in active battles at the time. He offered to send 3,000 more under the command of the Russian Defence Ministry and the Russian National Guard in November 2023. In May 2024, he stated that 43,500 soldiers from Chechnya had served in Ukraine, including 18,000 volunteers, and offered to send additional "tens of thousands" of reservists during a meeting with Putin.

Kadyrov on 24 May 2024 suggested the name of former speaker of the Parliament of the Chechen Republic Magomed Daudov for the position of Prime Minister of Chechnya, following the resignation of Prime Minister Muslim Khuchiev. Daudov, known for his loyalty to Kadyrov, had overseen Chechnya's response to COVID-19 and recruitment of Chechens into the Russian military for the invasion of Ukraine. Daudov was approved by the Chechen Parliament on the next day.

Kadyrov again signalled his intention to resign in May 2025, but backtracked shortly after meeting with Putin, where he stated that 55,000 Chechens were fighting in Ukraine, and later claimed that he had received backing on every issue he had discussed with the president. Al Jazeera reported citing Chechen opposition sources that Putin and Kadyrov's relationship had turned sour over the latter choosing his son Adam to succeed him.

In September 2025, the Security Service of Ukraine (SBU) charged Kadyrov in absentia with war crimes against Ukrainian soldiers, including ordering his fighters to kill Ukrainian troops on the battlefield rather than take them prisoner and turn POWs into human shields against drone strikes in Grozny.

== Chechen economic recovery and reconstruction ==
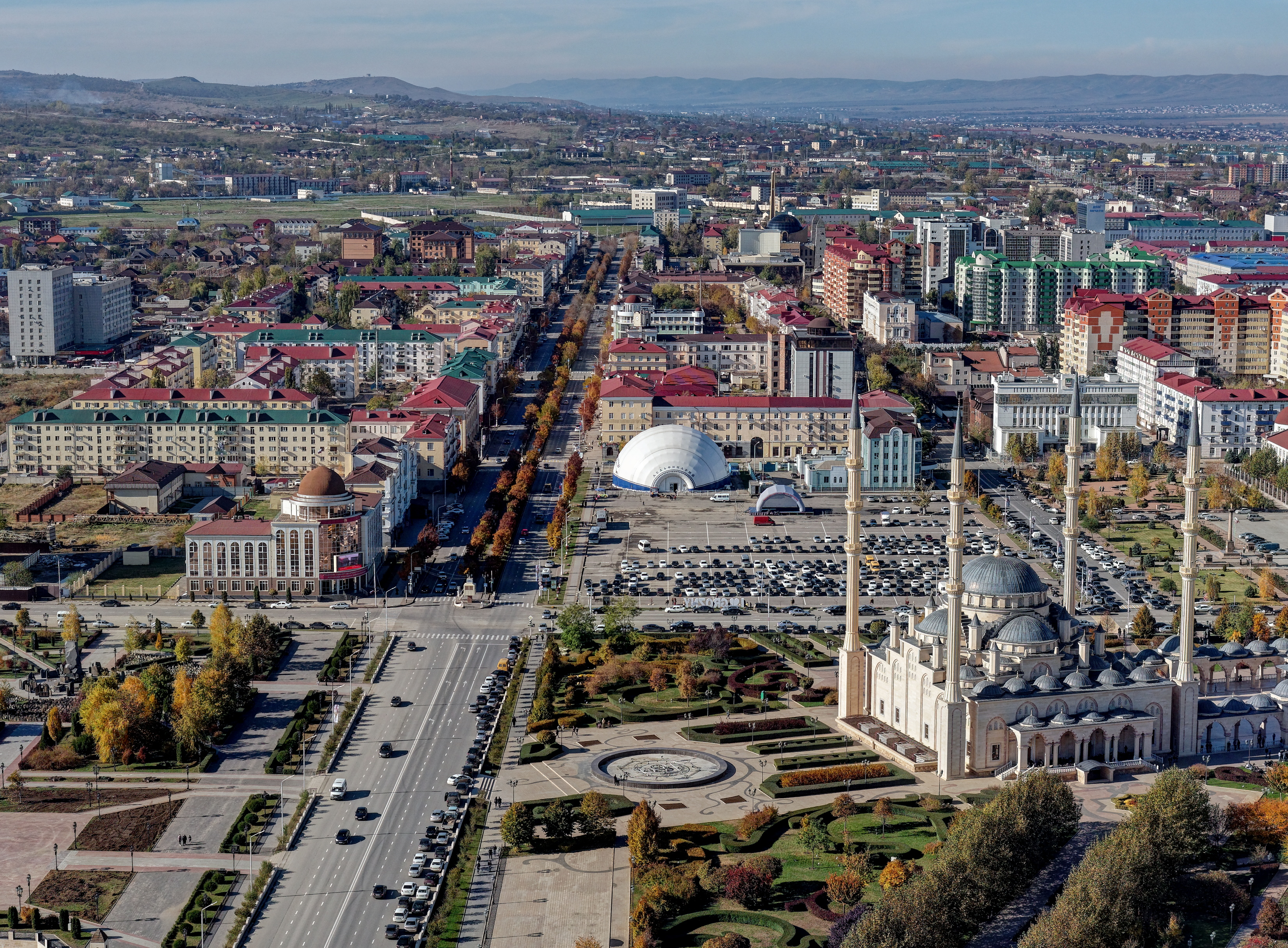
Chechen capital Grozny in 2016

In 2006, the production of Chechnya's industry increased by 11.9%. In 2007, the rate of growth was 26.4%.

In February 2010, head of the British delegation of the Human Rights Group Lord Judd, formerly "bitterly critical of the Russian authorities for the situation in Chechnya", pointed out a striking change for the better in the Russian North Caucasus republic. Judd said that changes which occurred since his visit as a member of PACE delegation in 2000 were "so overwhelming that sometimes you forget about what happened here until quite recently".

According to a 2016 report by Russian opposition leader Ilya Yashin, Kadyrov collected enormous wealth, primarily through theft of federal subsidies for Chechnya. Between 2001 and 2014 Chechnya has received over 464 billion roubles in subsidies, grants and donations with federal subsidies accounting for 80% of the republic's budget (and this does not include funds allocated for infrastructure managed at federal level such as roads). However, the administration of Chechnya is being criticized for spending public funds for their personal benefit—in 2010 Dmitry Medvedev noted that "federal funds often do not reach people; we know where they disappear; it is obvious-they are being stolen".

For example, the fleet of official vehicles in Chechnya accounts for half of all official vehicles in all Northern Caucasus republics. Public funds are being funnelled through Akhmad Kadyrov Foundation, which—while being registered as a charity—has never produced or published any financial reports as required by Russian law.

These violations are ignored by Russian Ministry of Justice, which in many cases has enforced them very strictly against other charities. The foundation operates a building company that services most of the publicly procured infrastructure projects in the republic and also collects a fee from all working citizens of Chechnya, ranging from 10 to 30% of their earnings, raising 3–4 billion roubles per year this way. Kadyrov himself declares annual income of 4.84 million roubles (2015), which is inconsistent with his lavish life-style, luxury vehicles, watches, race horses and mansions.

In 2020, Proekt.media published an in-depth analysis of business operations of Kadyrov and Adam Delimkhanov who are allegedly running multi-million dollar businesses in Moscow through a proxy provided by businessman Pavel Krotov.

== Policies ==
=== Human rights ===
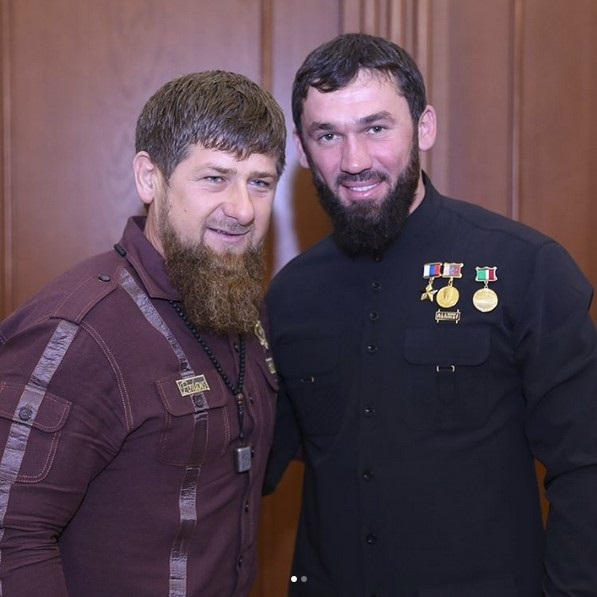
Kadyrov with Chechnya's parliamentary chairman Magomed Daudov in June 2016

Kadyrov has been personally implicated in several instances of torture and murder. A number of Chechens opposed to Kadyrov have been assassinated abroad, and several witnesses (including Artur Kurmakaev and Ruslan Khalidov) report the existence of a 300 name "Murder List". Chechens who have been murdered, where Kadyrov's involvement is suspected, include Movladi Baisarov and Ruslan Yamadayev (both Moscow); Sulim Yamadayev (Dubai); Gazhi Edilsutanov, Islam Dzahnibekov, Ali Osaev (Istanbul); and Umar Israilov (Vienna).

Kadyrov stated in December 2009 that he had personally helped many of the murder victims and their families and was not their enemy. "I don't want to kill, who did I fight? I fought terrorists. Who did I protect? I protected the whole of Russia so that people in Moscow or St. Petersburg...could live in peace. They accuse me of killing women and children. It's not true."

- A mutinied commander, Movladi Baisarov, said that Kadyrov "acts like a medieval tyrant. If someone tells the truth about what is going on, it's like signing one's own death warrant. Ramzan is a law unto himself. He can do anything he likes. He can take any woman and do whatever he pleases with her. (...) Ramzan acts with total impunity. I know of many people executed on his express orders and I know exactly where they were buried". On 18 November 2006, Baisarov was killed in an ambush by members of Kadyrov's police on Moscow's Leninsky Prospekt, about two kilometres from the Kremlin.
- On 13 November 2006, Human Rights Watch published a briefing paper on torture in Chechnya that it had prepared for the 37th session of the United Nations Committee Against Torture. The paper covered torture by personnel of the Second Operational Investigative Bureau (ORB-2), torture by units under the effective command of Kadyrov, torture in secret detentions and the continuing "forced disappearances". According to HRW, torture "in both official and secret detention facilities is widespread and systematic in Chechnya". In many cases the perpetrators were so confident that there would be no consequences for their abuses that they did not even attempt to conceal their identity. Based on extensive research, HRW concluded in 2005 that forced disappearances in Chechnya are so widespread and systematic that they constitute crimes against humanity.
- Anna Politkovskaya, a veteran Russian reporter (murdered in 2006) who reported extensively from Chechnya, claimed that she had received a grainy video footage shot on a mobile phone of a man identical in appearance to Kadyrov, and said that "the clips were the murders of federal servicemen by the Kadyrovites, and also kidnappings directed by Kadyrov. These are very serious things; on the basis of this evidence a criminal case and investigation should follow. This could allow this person to be brought to justice, something he has long richly deserved." On 7 October 2006, Politkovskaya was found shot dead in an elevator in her apartment in Moscow. She was allegedly working on an article revealing human rights abuses and regular incidents of torture in Chechnya at the time of her murder. Some observers alleged that Kadyrov or his men were possibly behind the assassination.
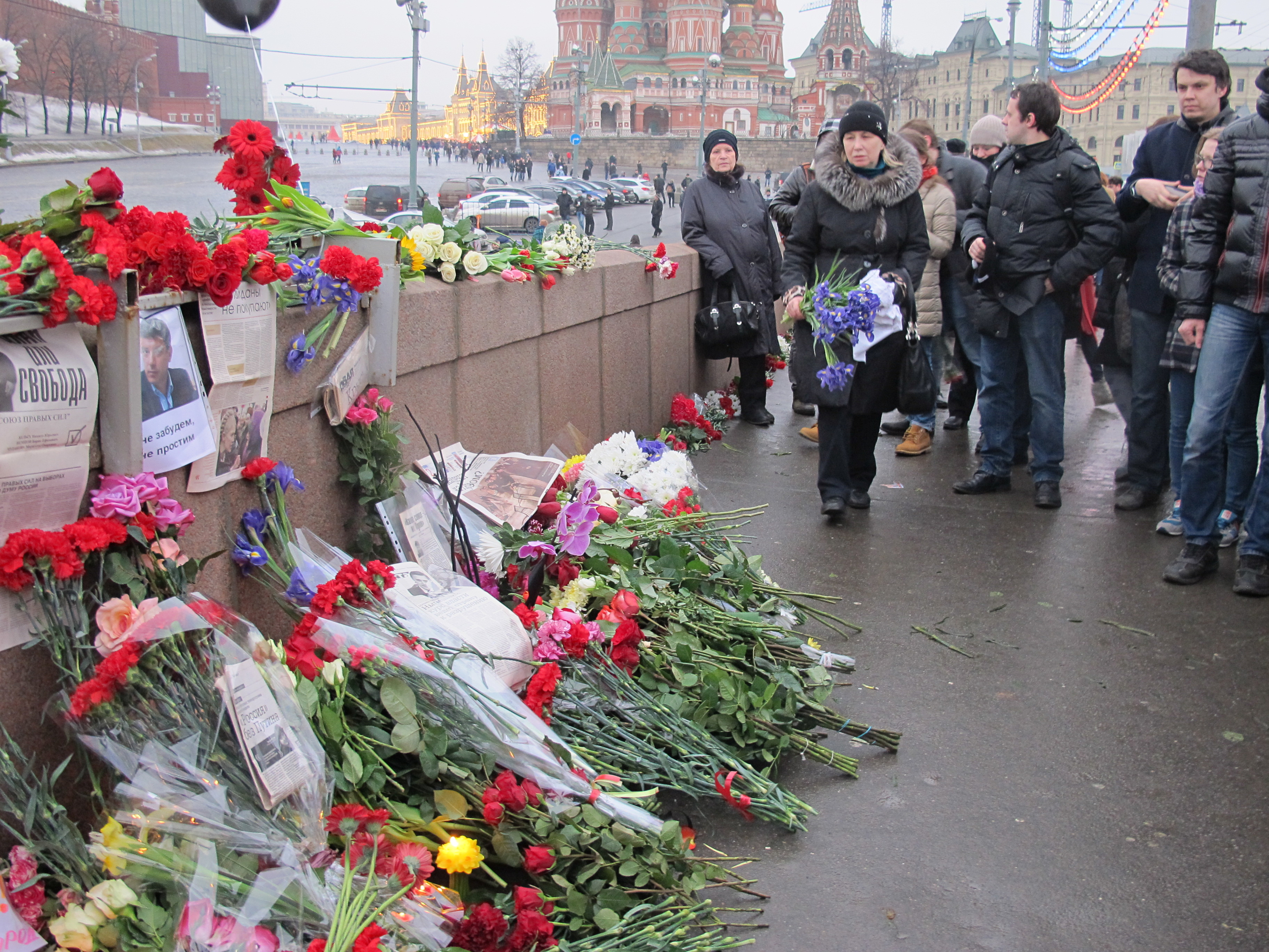
  Some observers alleged that Kadyrov or his men were possibly behind the assassination of Boris Nemtsov on 27 February 2015.
- On 23 October 2006, a criminal case was registered on the basis of the video tape frames published by the Novaya Gazeta newspaper in Anna Politkovskaya's article. Sergey Sokolov, deputy editor-in-chief of the paper, told the Echo Moskvy Radio that it can be clearly seen in the video as to how "Kadyrov's military forces are beating federal soldiers" with participation of "a man looking like Ramzan Kadyrov".
- German human rights group the Society for Threatened Peoples (GfbV), which branded Kadyrov a "war criminal", has alleged that up to 75 percent of recent incidents of murder, torture, rape, and kidnapping in Chechnya have been committed by Kadyrov's paramilitary forces.
- The Memorial group investigator stated in its report: "Considering the evidence we have gathered, we have no doubt that most of the crimes which are being committed now in Chechnya are the work of Kadyrov's men. There is also no doubt in our minds that Kadyrov has personally taken part in beating and torturing people. What they are doing is pure lawlessness. To make matters worse, they also go after people who are innocent, whose names were given by someone being tortured to death. He and his henchmen spread fear and terror in Chechnya. (...) They travel by night as death squads, kidnapping civilians, who are then locked in a torture chamber, raped and murdered".
- According to the International Helsinki Federation for Human Rights, many illegal places of detention exist in the Chechen Republic; most of them are run by Kadyrovites. In Tsentaroy (Khosi-Yurt), where the Kadyrovite headquarters is located, there are at least two illegal prisons functioning. One consists of concrete bunkers or pillboxes, where kidnapped relatives of armed Chechen fighters are held hostage while the second prison in Tsentaroy is evidently located in the yard—or in immediate vicinity—of the house of Kadyrov.
- The Kadyrovites are often accused of working as a death squad against Kadyrov's enemies. Kadyrov is rumoured to own a private prison in his stronghold of Tsentaroy, his home village south-east of Grozny. Fields around Tsentaroy are allegedly mined and all access routes are blocked by checkpoints. On 2 May 2006, representatives of the Council of Europe's Committee for the Prevention of Torture (CPT) alleged that they were prevented from entering the fortress.
- A video leaked out in which armed men, loyal to Kadyrov, displayed the severed head of a Chechen guerrilla (who was killed in July 2006) for public display in the village of Kurchaloi. They mounted the head on a pipe, together with blood-stained trousers and put a cigarette on him. It was displayed for at least a day as they came back a day later to record it again. On 21 September 2005, a similar incident occurred, as published by Memorial as well as Kavkazky Uzel which described "shocking details" of a special operation conducted by forces loyal to Kadyrov.
- On 1 March 2007, Lyudmila Alexeyeva, the head of the Moscow Helsinki Group rights organisation, stated that Kadyrov was "to blame for kidnappings of many innocent people. Their bodies were found later with signs of torture."
- Umar Israilov was assassinated in Vienna on 13 January 2009. Israilov was a former Kadyrov bodyguard, who cooperated with The New York Times, extensively detailing abuses committed by Kadyrov and his associates. Israilov had told Austrian authorities in 2008 that he had been threatened by an agent sent by Kadyrov to drop his lawsuit against the Chechen leader at the European Court of Human Rights in Strasbourg, France. On 27 April 2010, the Austrian prosecutor's office announced that they believed Kadyrov had ordered the kidnapping of Israilov and Israilov had been murdered while attempting to escape. According to the investigation, there was evidence that Otto Kaltenbrunner (adopted name of Ramzan Edilov), one of the suspected kidnappers, had been in contact with Kadyrov personally.
- On 15 July 2009, Natalia Estemirova, a member of Memorial society, who investigated the alleged abuses by government-backed militias in Chechnya, was abducted and shot to death. Memorial's chairman Oleg Petrovich Orlov accused Kadyrov of being behind the murder, and claimed that Kadyrov had openly threatened her by saying: "Yes, my arms are up to the elbows in blood. And I am not ashamed of that. I have killed and will kill bad people". Kadyrov denied any involvement in the killing and promised to investigate the killing personally. He condemned the killers, and in response to Orlov's accusations, said: "You are not a prosecutor or a judge therefore your claims about my guilt are not ethical, to put it mildly, and are insulting to me. I am sure that you have to think about my rights before declaring for everyone to hear that I am guilty of Estemirova's death." It was later reported that Kadyrov would be suing Memorial for defamation and slander, targeting Orlov personally with his complaint.
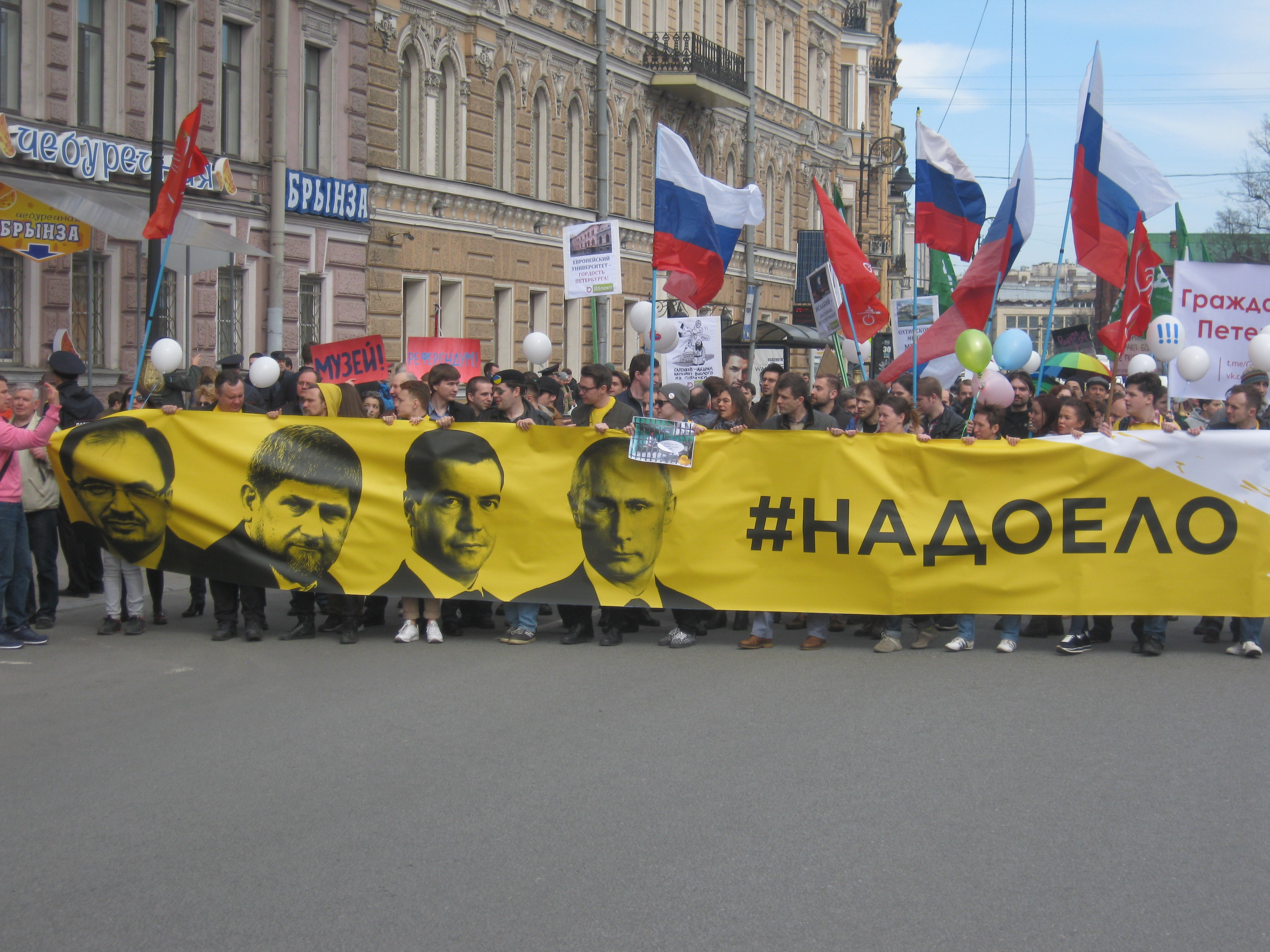
  Protest of the Russian opposition in St. Petersburg, 1 May 2017
- Memorial said in a statement on 19 August 2014 that when Kadyrov had lost his mobile phone during a wedding ceremony on 16 August, the police questioned thousands of people who had attended the wedding into early hours of the next morning in an attempt to find it.
- A man who criticised local officials and apparently Kadyrov in a YouTube appeal to the Russian president became a target of many threats due to which he had to flee to the neighboring republic of Dagestan. In May 2016, his house was burnt down by a group of masked men and his family was dragged out, put in a car and were thrown under a bridge. His wife also stated that they threatened the other residents with burning down their houses as well if they reported about the matter to anyone. Later, the Chechen police cordoned off his village in order to hunt him down. Kadyrov's spokesman denied these reports were true. The complainant later publicly apologised to Kadyrov and accused the media of distorting his remarks in his video complaint. He again fled to Dagestan in November 2016. According to human rights activist Svetlana Gannushkina, he had to flee after Chechnya's Deputy Interior Minister Apti Alaudinov personally threatened to kill him.
- After Memorial's Chechnya head Oyub Titiev was arrested in January 2018 over drug possession, Oyub's supporters claimed the charges were fake and were made-up by the Chechen authorities to suppress criticism of Kadyrov. Kadyrov called Oyub a "drug addict" while criticising those working with human rights activists and warned them off from working in his region.
- On 30 January 2020, Imran Aliev, an anti-Kadyrov blogger, was murdered in a hotel in Lille. French authorities have identified the alleged killer as a hitman having connections with the Chechen leader and who had travelled with Aliev in a train from Belgium to France.
- Tumso Abdurakhmanov, a dissident Chechen blogger, was attacked in February 2020, but managed to overpower the assailant, who claimed he had been sent by Moscow. Swedish prosecutors stated that the Chechen government was suspected of being involved in the attack. Dagens Nyheter reported on the trial in November, saying the attacker admitted that he was sent by the Chechen government, but had planned to fail. Another arrested suspect denied her own involvement.
- On the evening of 20 January 2022, Zarema Yangulbayeva (née Musaeva), the wife of Saidi Yangulbaev, a former judge of the Supreme Court of Chechnya, was abducted in Nizhny Novgorod and taken to Chechnya for interrogation. A day later, she was charged with assaulting a police officer. Kadyrov said the former judge's family members would either be in prison or underground and asked the Supreme Court of Russia to "kick out" Yangulbaev from the reserve and "erase his name from the history of the judicial body". Yangulbaev lost his position as a judge in 2015, saying he was forced to do so. Yangulbayeva is the mother of Abubakar Yangulbaev, a Chechen human rights activist and former lawyer for the Committee for the Prevention of Torture NGO.
- On 6 May 2024, Abdurakhmanov published a video showing a man burning a car bearing symbols associated with Kadyrov's son Adam in Grozny. Chechen authorities arrested around ninety people from Starye Atagi and Shali in response, with Abdullakh Magomadov being tortured to death in relation to the case while the death of another person was also believed to be connected to it. Authorities also targeted relatives of those arrested.

=== Rounding up, torture and execution of gay men ===
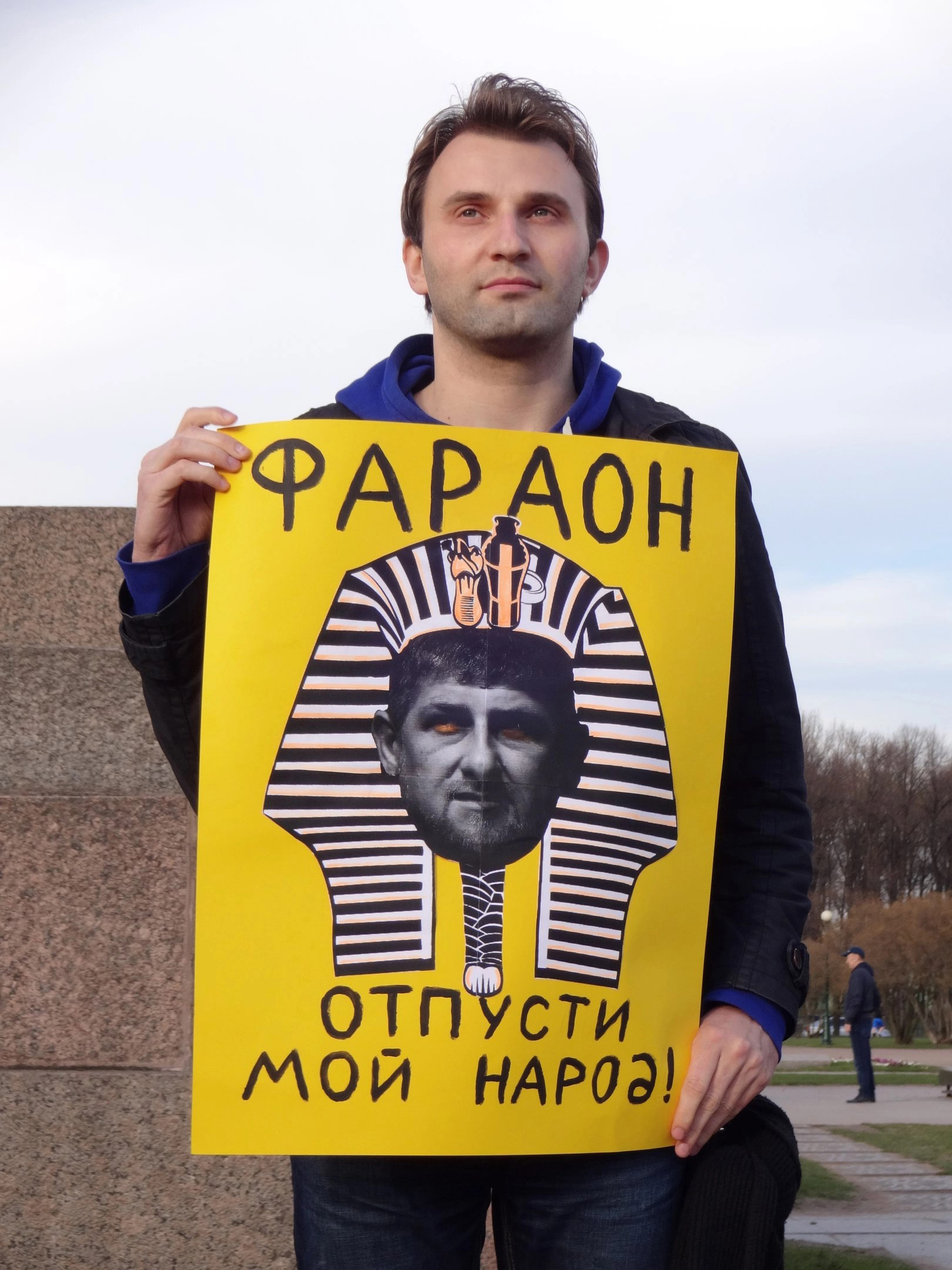
Petr Voskresensky-Stekanov with poster with Ramzan Kadyrov and the demand "Pharaoh, let my people go!". Protest against the genocide of LGBT people in Chechnya. 17 May 2017

Kadyrov has previously encouraged extrajudicial killings of homosexual men by family members as an alternative to law enforcement – in some cases, gay men in prison have been released early specifically to enable their murder by relatives.

"We don't have those kind of people here. We don't have any gays. If there are any take them to Canada. Praise be to God. Take them far from us so we don't have them at home. To purify our blood, if there are any here, take them."

— Kadyrov in an interview with HBO's Real Sports in July 2017

In April 2017, international media reported that gay men in Chechnya were being arrested, detained and tortured as part of a region-wide pogrom. Russian president Vladimir Putin said on 5 May that he would personally ask the Russian Prosecutor General and Interior Ministry to help Kremlin rights ombudswoman Tatyana Moskalkova check the reported abuse. UK Deputy Foreign Secretary Sir Alan Duncan told the UK Parliament he had been informed of alleged plans to eliminate Chechnya's gay community by the start of the Islamic holy month of Ramadan, which commenced on 26 May 2017.

Chechnya has denied the reports, with its interior minister calling the allegations an "April Fools' joke". Kadyrov's spokesman Alvi Karimov rejected the allegations and described the report in the Russian newspaper, Novaya Gazeta, as "absolute lies and disinformation", basing his denial on the claim that "you cannot detain and persecute people who simply do not exist in the republic. If there were such people in Chechnya, the law-enforcement organs wouldn't need to have anything to do with them because their relatives would send them somewhere from which there is no returning." Vladimir Putin's spokesperson Dmitry Peskov also said that there had been no evidence found to support the allegations, adding that he had no reason to doubt Kadyrov's claims that no one under his rule has been persecuted for their sexual orientation.

In an interview with HBO's Real Sports aired on 18 July, Kadyrov said, "We don't have those kind of people here. We don't have any gays. If there are any take them to Canada. Praise be to God. Take them far from us so we don't have them at home. To purify our blood, if there are any here, take them." He added that gay people were "not human".

Asked about the accusations of systematic torture, Kadyrov said, "They made it up. They are devils. They are for sale. They are subhuman. God damn them for slandering us."

=== Sanctions ===
Sanctioned by the UK government in 2014 in relation to Russo-Ukrainian War.

On 20 December 2017, the United States imposed sanctions under the Magnitsky Act on five Russian nationals including Kadyrov, accusing him of personal involvement in repression, torture and murder. U.S. officials accused him of heading "an administration involved in disappearances and extrajudicial killings," and that one or more of his political opponents were killed at his direction. He was added to United States Department of the Treasury's blacklist which also included a Chechen security official Ayub Kataev along with three other Russian individuals for their criminal involvement in a corruption case uncovered by Sergei Magnitsky.

In response, Kadyrov mocked the sanctions on his Instagram account. "A sleepless night is waiting for me." He further stated, "I can be proud that I'm out of favor with the special services of the USA," and added, "In fact, the USA cannot forgive me for dedicating my whole life to the fight against foreign terrorists among which there are bastards of America's special services."

President Putin's spokesman Dmitry Peskov called the sanctions "illegal" and "unfriendly" stating, "We consider these sanctions illegal, we consider them unfriendly, and we do not agree with them." He also stated that it was highly probable that Russia would retaliate by accusing U.S. officials or citizens of rights violations and banning them from the country.

Further sanctions were added on 20 July 2020, with United States Secretary of State accusing him of increasing abuses on civilians during the COVID-19 pandemic. His immediate family were also sanctioned. The sanctions also ban him, his wife and two of his daughters from traveling to the United States. Ministry of Foreign Affairs spokesperson Maria Zakharova told Sputnik that they will try to impose retaliatory sanctions. Kadyrov meanwhile posted a picture of himself along with firearms, saying, "Pompeo, we accept the fight! What comes next will be more interesting."

=== Threats to journalists ===
In 2004, Kadyrov had a conversation with the Novaya Gazeta journalist Anna Politkovskaya. One of his assistants said to her, "Someone ought to have shot you back in Moscow, right on the street, like they do in your Moscow". Ramzan then repeated after him, "You're an enemy. To be shot...." He is alleged by some observers to be behind her murder.

On 13 April 2020, Kadyrov threatened the journalist Elena Milashina on Instagram for her news article in Novaya Gazeta about Chechnya's coronavirus lockdown, stating it was "defamatory". He also criticized the federal authorities for not taking any action saying, "If you want us to commit a crime and become criminals, just say so! One [of us] will take on this responsibility and serve his time, as required by law." On Telegram, he later labeled her newspaper "anti-Russian" and a "foreign agent", also claiming it stereotyped Chechens.

Milashina had also covered Chechnya's gay purges and had been allegedly attacked on 6 February 2020. She accused the Chechen authorities of orchestrating the attack. Over 100 Russian celebrities and human rights activists, in response to Kadyrov's online threats, called upon the federal government to protect Milashina. Novaya Gazeta was made to delete Milashina's article from its website by the Office of the Prosecutor General of Russia, which claimed it was fake news and created a threat to the lives of citizens. Peskov dismissed Kadyrov's threats as an emotional response, saying everyone was on edge due to the coronavirus pandemic. Human Rights Watch criticized Peskov's reaction, stating it was "like a stark green light to Chechen officials to act on their threats."

On 21 April 2020, the US government funded Radio Free Europe/Radio Liberty stated that it had complained to Russian authorities after Kadyrov had threatened to punish their North Caucasus bureau chief Aslan Doukaev over an article against his government's restrictive coronavirus lockdown measures against farmers in an online video.

The ambassador of United States to Russia, John J. Sullivan, condemned Kadyrov's threats against Milashina and Aslan Doukaev, stating that freedom of press was a pillar of democracy. In a joint statement, French Human Rights Ambassador-at-Large François Croquette and the German Commissioner for Human Rights Policy Bärbel Kofler called Kadyrov's threats against Milashina unacceptable and urged Russia to investigate.

Kadyrov had personally warned to punish the Georgian journalist Giorgi Gabunia in June 2020, after he had insulted President Vladimir Putin on-air. The State Security Service of Georgia announced the arrest of a Russian citizen on 15 June for an assassination attempt on Gabunia. Georgian media and Gabunia's boss later claimed the assassin was sent by Kadyrov, who denied the allegations and said that if he had sent someone to kill, they would have succeeded. Kadyrov called Gabunia his enemy and said that he should beg for forgiveness by getting down on his knees, otherwise he would continue to remain one. Georgian authorities have neither confirmed nor denied the allegations against Kadyrov.

== Social media use ==
=== Networks ===
The number of subscribers to Kadyrov's social networks in 2016 was more than three million people, including three million followers of his Instagram account, according to the Chechen leader's press service. It said that he had 500,000 followers on the Russian VK social network, 760,860 on Facebook, 331,000 on Twitter and 5,447 on LiveJournal. Besides his Instagram postings, it was said that he had also made almost 5,000 on Twitter and 2,300 on VK. The Russian News Agency TASS said that Kadyrov had been "recognized as the most quoted Russian blogger."

In August 2016, The Wall Street Journal reported that Kadyrov had posted nearly 8,000 pictures on Instagram, which made him the online mobile photo-sharing, video-sharing, and social networking service's "most prolific political strongman".

The New York Times called Kadyrov's Instagram account "bizarre if strangely compelling", and Newsweek said it was "flashy". In a 2015 article, The New York Times said that Kadyrov was "Instagram-addicted".

The Russian programme director of Human Rights Watch said in an October 2016 article in The Guardian that "even the mildest criticism on social media [is] ruthlessly punished through unlawful, punitive detention, enforced disappearances, cruel and degrading treatment, death threats, threats against family members, and physical abuse of family members." She said that a social worker from a small town in Chechnya made a WhatsApp recording that went viral among Chechen users "imploring" Kadyrov "to look into the plight of ordinary people pushed below the poverty line" by local officials. The article stated that the woman, with her husband, "found herself hauled into the studio of Grozny TV, the state television and radio broadcaster" to face Kadyrov in person, "to apologise publicly for her lies." A "severe and sweeping repression by the local authorities is designed to remind the Chechen public of Kadyrov's total control," the article claimed.

=== WhatsApp interventions ===
In May 2015, Kadyrov gave a stern televised lecture to a group of Chechen men and women who were accused of using the WhatsApp messaging service to comment on the impending marriage of a local police chief to a teenage girl some three decades younger than him. The wedding had been widely discussed across Russia on reports that the young woman, Kheda Goylabiyeva, was being coerced into marriage with the chief, Nazhud Guchigov.

"Behave like Chechens", Kadyrov was reported as telling the assemblage of about a dozen people standing in the marbled courtyard of what appeared to be his government palace. "Honor of the family is the most important thing. Don't write such things any more. You, men, keep your women away from WhatsApp." In its coverage of the incident, The New York Times reported:

"Lock them in, do not let them go out, and they will not post anything", Mr. Kadyrov said in a video to a sheepish group of men and women who kept their arms folded across their chests and their eyes firmly on the ground during the harangue.

In December 2015, a female Chechen social worker criticised Kadyrov in an audio message posted on WhatsApp, after her boss tried to force her to allocate some money from her salary to be collateral for her next month's payment. Three days after posting the message, she appeared on Grozny TV along with her husband, where she was publicly berated by Kadyrov as well as parliament speaker Daudov, presidential administration head Islam Kadyrov and her boss. The couple apologised on live television for her message.

=== John Oliver ===
In May 2016, Kadyrov engaged in a brief Instagram dispute with US television host John Oliver. Kadyrov had posted a message on Instagram asking for help in finding his lost cat. The posting led Oliver to make a five-minute segment on HBO's Last Week Tonight dealing with the cat's disappearance and, according to The Guardian, Kadyrov's penchant for posting of, for example, "regular videos of his work-outs in the gym", also on Instagram. In addition, Oliver teased Kadyrov "for his propensity" to wear T-shirts bearing the image of Russian President Vladimir Putin. After the show, Oliver posted a photo of himself holding a cat, captioned "@RKadyrov Is this your cat?" Kadyrov responded in English, along with a doctored photo of Oliver wearing a Putin T-shirt, captioned, in part, "I am tired of jokes. I want to care for cats in Chechnya. By the way, Putin is our leader."

=== Account suspensions ===
Kadyrov stated that he found his Russian-language Instagram and Facebook accounts were not working on 23 December 2017, and he never received a response from Instagram after sending a request for service support. His English-language Instagram account remained unaffected however. Kadyrov accused them of bowing to pressure from United States after he was sanctioned.

He wrote on Telegram in response, "Instagram's move, which still wants to pretend it is independent from officials of Washington is weird." He added, "They wanted to stir my indignation, but were wrong, and this is the only thing which pleases me in actions Instagram and their patrons in the White House are undertaking. I have planned already to quit the network. But I thought I could fail my friends and subscribers, as on Instagram and Facebook I have more than 4 million followers."

The Speaker of the State Duma Vyacheslav Volodin stated that the decision by Facebook and Instagram to suspend Kadyrov's accounts violated his rights, stating, "They are afraid of a public conversation and the truth. Such decision cannot be explained in another way… The thing is that to read bloggers in social networks one needs to be their subscribers. By deleting an account, they deprive citizens of their right to know about bloggers' opinion and to communicate with them."

Russia's telecommunications overseer Roskomnadzor on 26 December asked Facebook to explain why they had suspended his accounts. Facebook issued a statement on 28 December that it did so after he was sanctioned by United States Department of the Treasury's Office of Foreign Assets Control as these came under trade sanctions.

== Other issues ==
=== Call to quarantine proceeds of horse race ===
On 3 November 2009, a horse owned by Kadyrov, Mourilyan, came third in the Melbourne Cup winning about US$380,000 in prize money. The leader of the Australian Greens, Senator Bob Brown, immediately called for the Government of Australia to quarantine the prize money until assurances are received as to how the money will be used. Concerns had been previously raised that the Melbourne Cup could be used to launder money by overseas individuals.

=== Honor killings ===
In 2009, Kadyrov stated his approval of honor killings of seven women, based on the belief that they were engaging in adultery. In an interview with David Scott of HBO, he condoned honor killings of homosexuals in July 2017 stating, "If we have [gay] people here, I'm telling you officially their relatives won't let them be because of our faith, our mentality, customs, traditions. Even if it's punishable under the law, we would still condone it."

=== WikiLeaks ===
On 28 November 2010, the US diplomatic cables leak named Kadyrov as a "starring guest" at some of Dagestan's most elaborate weddings, which indicates the political "Caucasus power structure" in these weddings. In 2006, leaked cables from an American diplomat recounted a lavish wedding attended by Kadyrov in Russia's Caucasus region in which guests threw $100 bills at child dancers, and which had nighttime "water-scooter jaunts on the Caspian Sea", and a report that Kadyrov gave the newly married couple a "five-kilo lump of gold".

=== Charlie Hebdo cartoons ===
In January 2015, Kadyrov said he would organize protests if a Russian newspaper published the Charlie Hebdo cartoons, saying "we will not allow anyone to insult the Prophet [Muhammad], even if it will cost us our lives." He also stated that Alexei Venediktov "will be brought to account" after his radio station Ekho Moskvy took a survey of readers on whether to publish the cartoons. Venediktov stated he would ask the authorities to intervene against Kadyrov's threats. During a protest rally against the cartoons attended by hundreds of thousands of people in Chechnya, he accused those backing Charlie Hebdo of using "false slogans about free speech and democracy".

After French teacher Samuel Paty was murdered by a man of Chechen descent for showing the Charlie Hebdo cartoons in his class, Kadyrov criticized the attack, but also told people to not provoke the religious sentiments of Muslims. He also criticized French society for provoking Muslims and stated that the country must have a state institution focusing on inter-ethnic and inter-faith relations. After France's president Emmanuel Macron defended Paty's actions under the right to free speech, Kadyrov on Instagram accused him of forcing people to resort to terrorism by doing so.

=== Support for polygamy ===
Kadyrov supports polygamy in Muslim-majority republics in Russia, and believes that Muslims who speak out against the practice are not true adherents to their faith. According to Kadyrov, men legally marrying more than one wife would be more honest than having many mistresses, and would resolve Russia's demographic problem. In April 2018, he stated that all Muslim men are permitted by Allah to have four wives but discouraged having the marriages officially registered. He also denied reports that polygamy would be legalised in Chechnya.

=== Boston Marathon bombing ===
After the Boston Marathon bombing, Kadyrov expressed sadness for the victims but denied the suspects had any ties to his region in a statement on his Instagram. He suggested that the suspects were products of American upbringing. Kadyrov accused the CIA of framing Dzhokhar Tsarnaev on 18 March 2015, after he was handed a death sentence for the Boston Marathon Bombing and said that they could not have conducted the bombing without CIA's knowledge.

=== Threats to opposition politicians ===
On 31 January 2016, Kadyrov posted a video of Russian opposition politicians Mikhail Kasyanov and Vladimir Vladimirovich Kara-Murza in the crosshairs of a gun on his Instagram blog. In a few days, after multiple complaints, Instagram removed the video prompting Kadyrov to criticize the decision: "This is the much-boasted freedom of speech in America! You can write anything but cannot touch those American dogs, those friends of the Congress and the State Department".

=== Report by Ilya Yashin ===
Russian opposition leader Ilya Yashin authored a report against Kadyrov released on 23 February 2016 during a press conference which was repeatedly interrupted by police and hecklers. He also claimed that Kadyrov had murdered Boris Nemtsov. The report titled A National Security Threat claimed that Kadyrov poses a threat to Russia. It included allegations of corruption, authoritarian rule, secret prisons, rigging votes in favour of Vladimir Putin, stealing from the country's national budget to enrich himself, enforcing Sharia law over Russian law, his lavish lifestyle, building and maintaining a personal army of about 30,000 fighters, purported ties to organised crime figures, and his involvement in politically motivated murders of journalists, human rights activists and political opponents.

The report contained 20 questions which Yashin had invited Kadyrov to answer but was refused. Kadyrov dismissed the report calling it "nothing but idle chatter" and posted it on his social network accounts before its release. His spokesman filed a request with the Russian Prosecutor General and the Investigative Committee for Yashin to be arrested for the report saying it contained slander and insults against Kadyrov.

=== Grozny fatwa ===
In August 2016, Kadyrov convened a conference of Islamic scholars, funded by the Tabah Foundation in the United Arab Emirates, in Grozny. The conference was attended by notable Islamic scholars, including the Grand Imam of Al-Azhar, Ahmed el-Tayeb; the Grand Mufti of Egypt, Shawki Allam; the ex-Grand Mufti of Egypt Ali Gomaa, Osama al-Azhari, who is the religious adviser to Egyptian president Abdel Fattah el-Sisi; Habib Ali al-Jifri, and the mufti of Damascus, Abdul Fattah al-Bizm.

The conference was convened to discuss the alleged abuse of Islamic ideas to propagate extremism and to establish the criteria for determining who are the true followers of the Sunnah. The assembly of scholars issued a fatwa which declared that those who abide by the Kalam, belong to the four madhhabs and follow the path of moral self-perfection espoused by distinguished Islamic teachers, primarily the Sufi sheikhs, were the only true believers. The fatwa called the sect of Salafism a "dangerous and erroneous contemporary sect", along with extremist groups like the Islamic State of Iraq and the Levant and Hizb ut-Tahrir.

The conference issued two further documents. In the first, it appealed to President Vladimir Putin to ban Salafism and term any condemnation of "traditional Islam" as "extremism". It proposed the fatwa be regarded as the considered opinion of "leading Russian experts" when evaluating the activity of Muslim organizations and the preaching of individual clerics. The second document issued a resolution calling for the establishment of a Council for Islamic Education and a Council of Ulema, which would rule on who is and is not a true follower of Sunni Islam.

The ruling created a controversy, with both Islamic theologians and secular commentators condemning it, with some seeing it as a bid by Kadyrov to divide Russian Muslims into those who accept the importance he places on teachings of the Sufi brotherhoods and likely what he considers to be "traditional Islam" without question, and those who do not, labeled as possessing "erroneous" views. Many of the key participants also disavowed the resolutions. Mukkadas Bibarsov, mufti of Saratov Oblast, stated that the question of who was a true follower of Sunni Islam was resolved "centuries ago". He added that the fatwa failed to take into account the crucial differences between Russia's Muslims, specifically that some Muslim communities did not follow Sufism.

Liz Fuller, writing for Radio Free Europe/Radio Liberty, commented that the fatwa seemed to be giving permission to Kadyrov to take any action he likes to punish those whose religious views do not coincide with his own. Yaroslav Trofimov, writing for The Wall Street Journal, described it as a "new fracture emerging within Islam". Many Saudi clerics and citizens expressed outrage on social media at the fatwa. The Muslim Brotherhood expressed "deep sorrow" over the fatwa, stating that it "ignited fires of discord among Muslims around the world."

=== Threats to Russian police officers ===
In 2015, Kadyrov ordered Chechen security forces to "shoot to kill" if they encountered police officers from other parts of Russia on the territory of the Chechen Republic. Kadyrov said: "I would like to officially state: Open fire if someone from Moscow or Stavropol—it doesn't matter where from—appears on your turf without your knowledge. We have to be reckoned with. … If you are masters of your territory, then you must control it." According to Ekaterina Sokirianskaia, "Some critics claim that Mr. Putin now fears Mr. Kadyrov because he knows any serious attempt to challenge the Chechen leader's position might lead to a third war."

=== Mixed martial arts tournament involving child fighters ===
A mixed martial arts tournament involving children was held as an "exhibition fight" on 4 October during the Grand Prix Akhmat 2016 in Grozny and broadcast on Match TV. Three of Kadyrov's sons, all of them aged under 12, fought in the tournament with Kadyrov sitting in the audience and none of the fighters wearing any protective gear. One of the fights ended with a technical knockout. Kadyrov posted images of the bouts on his Instagram account.

The event caused an outcry especially against Kadyrov allowing his children to compete in the tournament. Fedor Emelianenko, the president of Russian MMA Union, criticised the event as "inexcusable", stating that rules stipulate fighters under the age of 21 have to wear protective gear while children under the age of 12 are not allowed to compete. Vadim Finkelstein, the head of MMA promotion M-1 Global backed Emelianenko's comments.

Dmitry Peskov, the spokesperson for President Putin, stated that the fact that one of the fights between the children finished with a technical knockout was "a reason for the appropriate oversight agencies to inquire about this incident." Deputy Minister of Sports Pavel Kolobkov stated that participation of children under the age of 12 in MMA competitions was illegal while stating that the incident was being investigated. Sports Minister Vitaly Mutko also stated that the event will be investigated.

Several Chechen officials responded to Fedor's criticism with insults and accusations including Timur Dugazayev, general director of Akhmat MMA promotion, Member of Parliament Adam Delimkhanov as well as Kadyrov himself. The Ministry of Sports found on 18 October that Kadyrov's promotion had violated regulations. It also found that the event was actually an unlicensed show with no regulatory oversight. The promotion was directed to coordinate with the Ministry of Sports and other regulatory bodies to "prevent such irregularities in conduct" and handed a letter detailing its failure to comply with the legislation.

=== Comments about nuclear warfare ===
Kadyrov commented about Russia's nuclear arsenal and tensions between the United States and Russia. He said that "America is not really a strong enough state for us to regard it as an enemy of Russia, we have a strong government and are a nuclear state." He added, "Even if our government was completely destroyed, our nuclear missiles would be automatically deployed. We will put the whole world on its knees and screw it from behind." In October 2022, Kadyrov started advocating for Russia to use low-yield nuclear weapons in Ukraine.

=== Persecution of Muslims in Myanmar ===
In September 2017, Kadyrov condemned the persecution of Muslims in Myanmar and organized a rally in Grozny in support of persecuted Rohingya people. Kadyrov pledged to oppose the Russian Federation's position if it supported Aung San Suu Kyi's government in Myanmar.

=== Threats to citizens insulting someone's honor ===
In June 2019, Kadyrov, in an Instagram video, told the citizens of Dagestan to not insult Chechnya or Chechens online amidst a controversy over a piece of land of the republic labeled as belonging to Chechnya, threatening to torture whoever insulted the honor of Chechens. He also warned people to remove any such comments, otherwise they would have to answer to Chechen law enforcement agencies.

During a government function organized for medium and small-scale businesses in November 2019, Kadyrov called for online users insulting someone's honor to be killed, arrested or intimidated per a BBC Russian Service translation. He stated in the same speech that he did not call for the targeting of law-abiding citizens, but of others, i.e., "crooks, traitors, tattletales and schizophrenics of all stripes." Kadyrov's spokesman, Alvi Karimov, denied the accuracy of the BBC translation; however, Meduza's translation found it to be accurate. The speech itself was broadcast on a state-owned TV channel. Russian diplomat Dmitry Peskov stated that Kadyrov's remarks would not be investigated by the Russian government as it was a police matter.

==== Allegations of assassination attempt plotted by Duma deputies ====
On 10 October 2024, the Russian news agency TASS reported that Kadyrov accused three named members of the Russian parliament of commissioning an attempt to assassinate him. The background was said to be a conflict connected to a business merger.

== Personal life ==
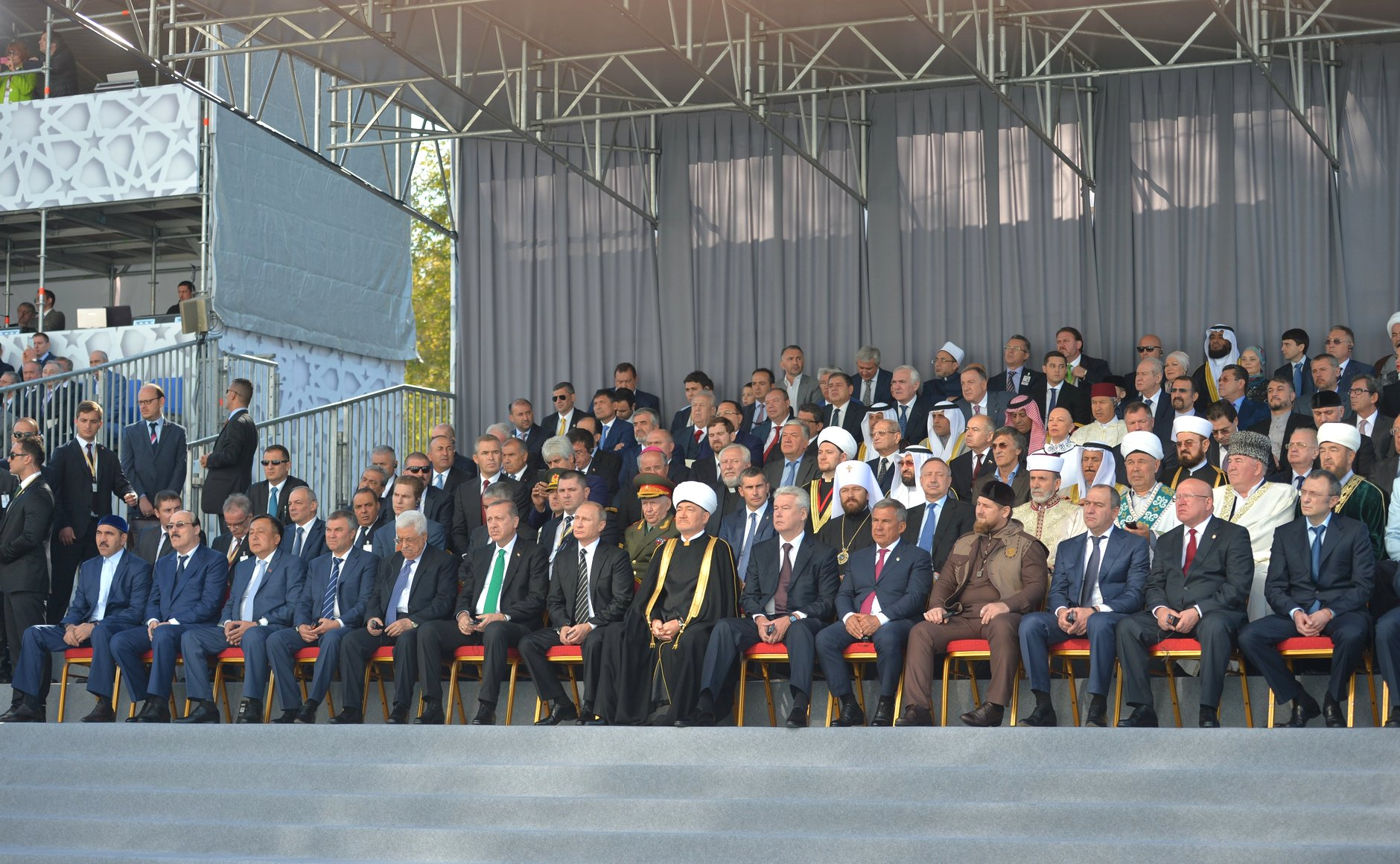
The opening of the Moscow Cathedral Mosque in September 2015

Kadyrov graduated with a degree in law from the Makhachkala Institute of Business and Law in 2004. In 2006, he defended his thesis at Dagestan State Technical University to obtain a Candidate of Sciences degree in economics. In 2015, he defended his thesis at Dagestan State University to obtain a Doctor of Sciences degree in economics.

Kadyrov has adopted a macho image where he frequently poses with guns and military garb, and associates with mixed martial artists. In 2022, he was pictured in military garb and $1,580 Prada Monolith boots. The New Yorker says that Kadyrov has adopted various personalities over the years: "the merciless warrior in fatigues who leads special operations to kill anti-government rebels; the jolly Caucasus baron who spars with Mike Tyson and shows off his private zoo; the family man and observant Muslim who has banned alcohol, ordered that women wear headscarves in public buildings, and boasts that his six-year-old son has memorized the Koran."

Kadyrov enjoys boxing and is the owner of Fight Club Akhmat, a professional sports club that focuses on boxing and mixed martial arts.

=== Family ===
In 1996, Kadyrov married Medni Kadyrova. The couple are parents of twelve children. Two sons, Adam and Eli, have earned the title of hafiz, while three daughters, Aishat, Khadizhat and Khutmat, have earned the title of hafiza.

Khutmat and another daughter, Ashura, performed together with the nasheed singer Mishary Rashid Alafasy in 2015. Khadizhat was recognised as the most gifted student in Chechnya in 2016 and qualified for participation in the pan-Russian contest "Student of the Year 2016" on 20 February 2016. Medni launched her 'Firdaws' fashion line in March 2012 in Dubai. Aishat presented her own fashion collection in March 2017 and took over her mother's fashion enterprise, Firdaws. She was appointed as the First Deputy Minister of Culture of the Chechen Republic in September 2020 by her father, as the Minister of Culture in October 2021 and later the Deputy Prime Minister for Social Issues in October 2023. Khadizhat was appointed as the First Deputy Head of the Administration of the Leader and Government of Chechnya in January 2024.

Adam was appointed as the leader of his father's security team in 2023 and was awarded the "Hero of the Chechen Republic" medal after a video emerged of him beating up a prisoner, which was praised by Ramzan himself, in addition to awards from other republics of the North Caucasus. The Guardian reported that this was a signal by Ramzan that Chechnya would continue to be controlled by his family after him. Kadyrov later appointed him as the supervisor of the special forces training school in Gudermes in April 2024, an observer in the Sheikh Mansur Rifle Battalion, and as the superverisor of Chechnya's interior ministry as well as the secretary of Chechnya's security council in April 2025.

Ramzan appointed his eldest son Akhmat as the First Deputy Minister of Physical Culture, Sports and Youth Policy of the Chechen Republic in November 2023, as the Minister of Youth Affairs in February 2024, and later as the Minister of Physical Culture and Sports in May 2024. He was also appointed as the head of FC Akhmat Grozny in May 2024.

According to a 2021 investigation by the Organized Crime and Corruption Reporting Project, Kadyrov has a second wife, Fatima Khazuyeva. Kadyrov reportedly met Khazuyeva when she was fourteen years old at a 2006 beauty pageant. He reportedly also has a third wife, a singer and dancer named Aminat Akhmadova. A documentary and investigation by Proekt in June 2024 claimed that Fatima was the real mother of Eli and gave birth to him when she fifteen, while Kadyrov also had sexual relations with Zamira Dzhabrailova when she was fifteen and she gave birth to Adam at the age of sixteen. It also claimed that he had relations with several other minors and had a preference for underage girls who were virgins, with an assistant being responsible for procuring them for him.

As of May 2024, six out of 23 top positions in the Chechen government were held by Kadyrov's children or their spouses, while five positions were held by distant relatives or those from his birthplace of Akhmat-Yurt. His son-in-law Ramzan Vismuradov served as a deputy prime minister without portfolio, while the First Deputy Prime Minister Isa Tumkhadzhiyev was married to a relative of his.

=== Wealth ===
The Russian Federation funnels money to the Kadyrov family; the distinction between the Chechen government and Kadyrov is blurred. In 2015, Chechnya received around 57 billion roubles a year from Moscow (about £550m). The family obtains money through the Akhmad Kadyrov Fund, a non-transparent foundation which describes itself as a charity and is headed by Kadyrov's mother, Ayman. In 2011, the foundation funded Kadyrov's lavish 35-year birthday party, which featured celebrities such as Seal, Jean-Claude Van Damme, Vanessa-Mae and Hilary Swank. When journalist Marianna Maksimovskaya asked him where the money for the live-televised celebration was coming from, he reportedly laughed and said "Allah gives it to us", before adding: "I don't know, it comes from somewhere." Journalists have been targeted by Kadyrov's regime for reporting on his opulence.

Kadyrov is a noted collector of sports cars. He owns a Lamborghini Reventón, one of only 20 sold. He is also known for his extensive collection of Chechen daggers. Kadyrov has been linked to the ownership of a private jet. and he claimed to have received from Elon Musk a Cybertruck, though this is not confirmed and has been disputed by Musk himself.

Kadyrov's family members own luxurious real estate in Moscow. Two of his wives own property valued at $8 million in total, which is more than twice Kadyrov's declared salary since 2008.

=== Health issues ===
Rumors started circulating about Kadyrov's health worsening and him being admitted to the Moscow Central Clinical Hospital in mid-September 2023, with Telegram channels operated by the Chechen opposition claiming that he had suffered a kidney failure and was in a coma. Dmitry Peskov stated that he had no information about his health. Kadyrov soon released videos to counter the rumors, insisting he was fine.

Novaya Gazeta Europe claimed in late-April 2024 that Kadyrov was diagnosed with pancreatic necrosis in 2019 and his condition had recently started worsening, causing the federal government to search for a potential successor. Kadyrov released a video hours later of him exercising in the gym. The Guardian stated that despite insisting that he was in good health, Kadyrov's public appearances showed him with a swollen face, slurred speech and keeping awake with much difficulty.

In January 2026, The Moscow Times reported that Ukraine claimed Kadyrov has been hospitalized again for kidney failure and in a coma.

On 17 January 2026, Adam Kadyrov was involved in a traffic crash in Grozny. Kadyrov was "in critical condition and is being prepared for transport to Moscow for medical treatment", according to the opposition Chechen channel Niyso on Telegram. Subsequently an An-148-100-EM flying hospital from the Ministry of Emergency Situations landed in Moscow's Vnukovo Airport carrying Adam. His father landed shortly after in his own plane.

== See also ==
- List of Heroes of the Russian Federation
- Politics of Chechnya

== Notes ==
Political offices
Preceded by Alu Alkhanov	Head of the Chechen Republic; 2007–present	Incumbent
