= Kadyrov family =

Chechen political family

Kadyrov Кадыров
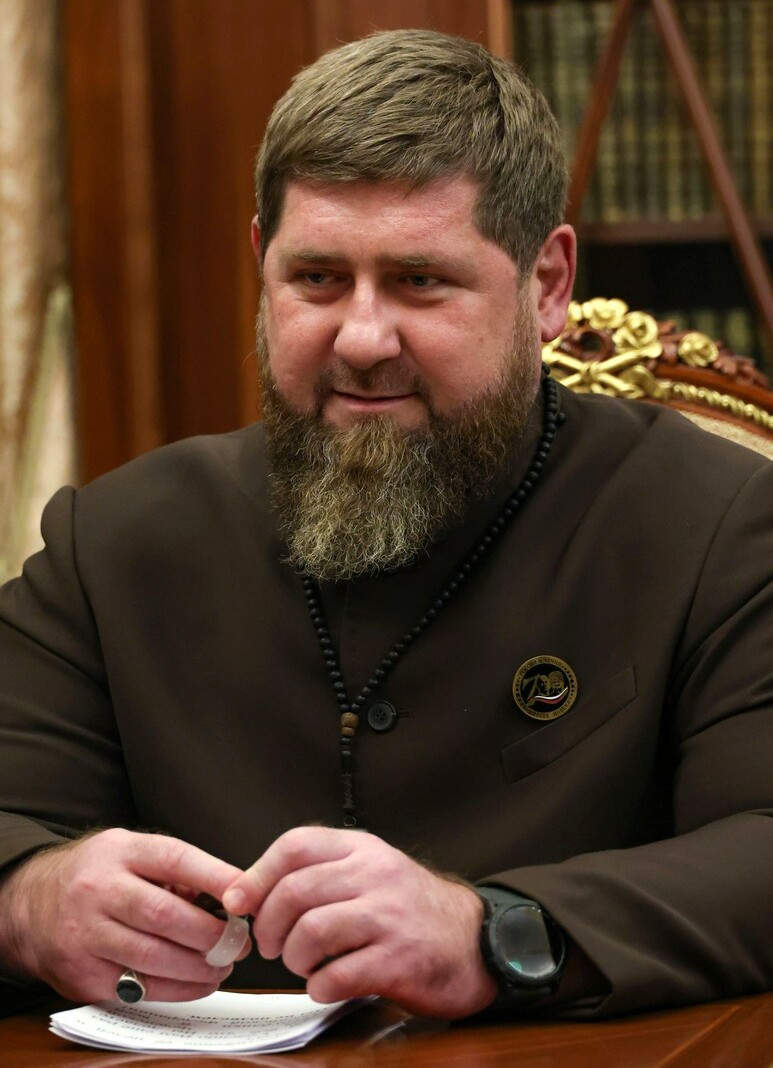
- Ramzan Kadyrov, son of Akhmad Kadyrov and current Head of the Chechen Republic
- Founded: Akhmad Kadyrov's appointment as President of the Chechen Republic; 2000, Grozny; 26 years ago
- Titles: Head of the Chechen Republic; President of the Chechen Republic; Mufti of the Spiritual Administration of the Muslims of the Chechen Republic

The Kadyrov family is a Chechen political family that has played a prominent role in the governance of Chechnya, an autonomous region of Russia, since Akhmad Kadyrov became the head of the Chechen state in 2000. The region has been governed by members of the Kadyrov family nearly continuously since 2000, with a brief lapse in power from 2004 to 2007 during Alu Alkhanov's tenure as president.

Ramzan Kadyrov has been noted for attempting to establish a political dynasty to succeed him, appointing various family members to key positions within the Chechen political administration and paramilitary forces. Under the control of the Kadyrov family, Chechnya has become notable for its human rights abuses, including murder, torture, forced disappearances and illegal destruction of property, particularly against LGBTQ+ groups.

== Members ==
- Akhmad Kadyrov (1951–2004), Head of the Chechen Republic and Mufti of the Spiritual Administration of the Muslims of the Chechen Republic
- Ramzan Kadyrov (born 1976), Head of the Chechen Republic
- Medni Kadyrova (born 1978), public figure and wife of Ramzan Kadyrov
- Aishat Kadyrova (born 1998), Deputy Prime Minister of the Chechen Republic and Minister of Culture
- Adam Kadyrov (born 2007), Head of the Security Service of the President of the Chechen Republic
- Adam Delimkhanov (born 1969), Member of the State Duma
- Alibek Delimkhanov (born 1974), Deputy Head of the North Caucasian National Guard District
- Sharip Delimkhanov (born 1980), Head of the Chechen Branch of the National Guard of Russia
- Khamzat Kadyrov (born 1997), Deputy Prime Minister of the Chechen Republic, Advisor-Assistant for the Security Bloc, Minister of Property and Land Relations, Head of the Administration of the Kurchaloyevsky District, Minister of Physical Culture and Sports, Member of the Presidium of the Regional Political Council of United Russia
- Yakub Zakriev, Minister of Agriculture, Mayor of Grozny and Director of Danone Russia
- Khadizhat Kadyrova, Head of the Department of Preschool Education in Grozny
- Khutmat Kadyrova, Deputy Head of Ramzan Kadyrov's secretariat and Minister of Healthcare
- Khas-Magomed Kadyrov, Mayor of Grozny
