= Nebi =

Nebi may refer to:

== People ==
- Nebi or Hnabi (710–789), Alemannian duke
- Nebi Mustafi (born 1976), Albanian-Macedonian football player
- Nebi Sefa (1861–1942), Albanian politician

== See also ==
- Nabi (disambiguation)
