= Nabis =

Nabis may refer to:

- Nabis of Sparta, reigned 207–192 BCE
- Nabis (art), a Parisian post-Impressionist artistic group
- Nabis (bug), a genus of insects
- NABIS, National Ballistics Intelligence Service, a British government agency

== See also ==
- Nabi (disambiguation)
