= Adam Kadyrov =

Son of Ramzan Kadyrov (born 2007)

- Адам Кадыров
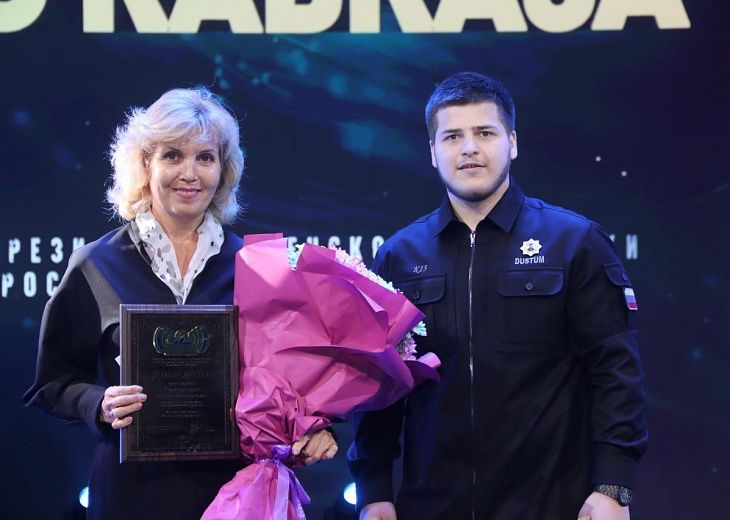
- Kadyrov in 2025

Secretary of the Security Council of Chechnya
- Incumbent
- Assumed office 21 April 2025
- President: Ramzan Kadyrov

Personal details
- Born: 24 November 2007 (age 18) Grozny, Chechen Republic, Russian Federation
- Spouse: Medni (since 2025)
- Relations: Kadyrov family
- Parent(s): Ramzan Kadyrov (father); Medni Kadyrova (mother)
- Occupation: Hafiz, mixed martial arts fighter, boxer, politician
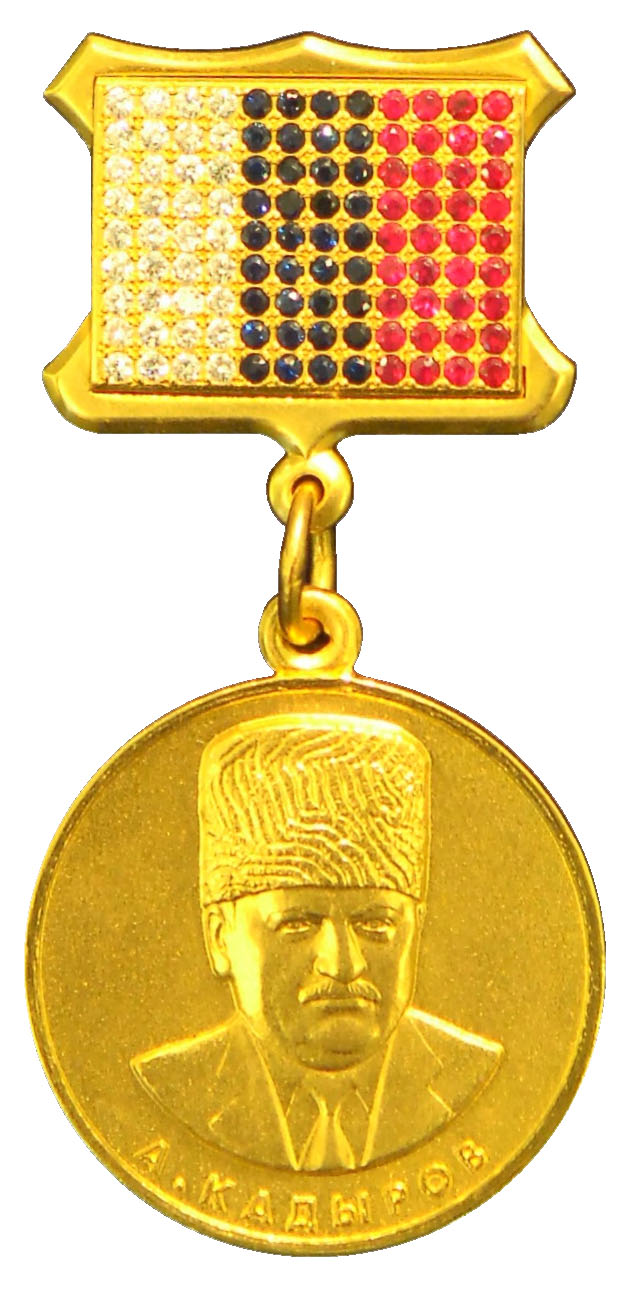
- Awards

Military service
- Allegiance: Russia
- Branch/service: Ministry of Internal Affairs
- Rank: Lieutenant
- Battles/wars: Russo-Ukrainian war (alleged)

Adam Ramzanovich Kadyrov (Russian: Адам Рамзанович Кадыров; born 24 November 2007) is a Russian official and son of Ramzan Kadyrov who has served as the head of the Security Service of the President of the Chechen Republic since 5 November 2023.

Kadyrov became notable following a video published in November 2023 depicting him assaulting a prisoner accused of burning the Quran. The video sparked widespread condemnation, even from some pro-Kremlin hardliners. Nevertheless, his father publicly expressed pride in his son, praising Adam for embracing what he called "adult ideals of honour, dignity, and the defence of his religion". Following the beating, Kadyrov was given six medals by the Chechen government and promoted alongside several of his siblings by his father amid rumours of the elder Kadyrov's ill health, and that he was preparing a dynasty to succeed him.

In April 2025, it was reported that Kadyrov was appointed secretary of the Chechnya's security council. At the time, he also served as his father's chief bodyguard, a trustee of Chechnya's Special Forces University, and an observer in a newly formed rifle battalion, a role he was appointed in November 2023. Alongside his other positions, Kadyrov also oversees Chechnya’s police.

On 17 January 2026, Adam Kadyrov was, according to an opposition Telegram channel, involved in a traffic crash in Grozny. Kadyrov was "in critical condition and is being prepared for transport to Moscow for medical treatment, according to the opposition Chechen channel Niyso on Telegram". Subsequently an An-148-100-EM flying hospital, from Ministry of Emergency Situations, landed in Moscow’s Vnukovo Airport believed to be carrying Adam Kadyrov, his father is presumed to have landed shortly after in his own plane.

In September 2026, during a public event, Kadyrov appeared in military uniform with the rank of lieutenant.

== Personal life ==
In June 2025, Kadyrov got married. The identity of the bride is not known, with conflicting reports indicating it might be the daughter of Chechen senator Suleiman Geremeyev or the granddaughter of State Duma deputy Adam Delimkhanov. If it is Delimkhanov's granddaughter, she would have only been 14 years old at the time of the wedding. The celebrations, held in Akhmat-Yurt, were attended by high-ranking officials and included a message of congratulations from President Vladimir Putin. Images from the wedding show Kadyrov arriving in a new limited-edition Mercedes (a car illegal to export to Russia) while wearing a wristwatch valued at at least $2 million and firing an automatic handgun into the air.

== Awards ==
The Chechen government gave Kadyrov, a teenager, 16 awards and decorations over the period February 2022 to August 2025. Kadyrov has been awarded the Hero of the Chechen Republic twice, first in 2023 at the age of 15 and again in 2026 at the age of 18.

Among Kadyrov's various awards are:

- Hero of the Chechen Republic x2
- The Order of Kadyrov
- The Order of "Daymekhkan Siy"
- The Medal "In Memory of Akhmad Kadyrov"
- Medal "For Labor Valor" (Ministry of Defense)
- "For Contribution to the Development of the Russian Special Forces University" 1st Class
- "For Service to the Religion of Islam" 1st Class
- Order "For Services to the Karachay-Cherkess Republic"
- "For Services to the Ummah"
- "For Services to the Kabardino-Balkarian Republic"
- The Order of Duslyk
