= Kanti Abdurakhmanov =

- Канти Абдурахманов
- Born: 1916; Shali, Russian Empire
- Died: 28 March 2000 (aged 83–84); Argun, Russian Federation
- Military career
- Allegiance: Soviet Union
- Branch: Red Army
- Service years: 1941–1946
- Rank: Starshina (Master Sergeant)
- Unit: 156th Guards Rifle Regiment
- Conflicts: World War II
- Awards: Hero of the Russian Federation

Kanti Abdurakhmanov (Russian: Канти Абдурахманов; 1916 – March 28, 2000) was a Chechen Master Sergeant in an artillery battery of the Red Army during World War II. For heroic deeds during the war he was awarded the title Hero of the Russian Federation in May 1996.

== Early life ==
Born in 1916 in the Chechen town of Shali, he became an orphan at an early age. He worked as a farmhand and then was employed on a collective farm before he volunteered to join the army in 1941 after the start of Operation Barbarossa.

== World War II ==
Upon entering the military, Abdurakhmanov completed junior artillery commanders' training in Tashkent in June 1942. From October 1943 to May 1945 he served in the acting Army and took part in a number of offensive battles, on several occasions he was wounded but returned to the Army.

During an offensive battle in December 1943 to the West of Vitebsk the infantry lay under intense fire from the fortified position of the enemy. Abdurakhmanov with his squad moved the cannon out and, despite the enemy's machine gun fire, destroyed the enemy pillbox with several precise hits. That enabled fighters to attack and occupy the enemy's frontier. In June 1944 Abdurakhmanov repeated his deed during the forced crossing of the Daugava river in a similar situation, which ensured the success of the operation. During the war he destroyed a number of enemy tanks and was awarded the Order of Glory 3rd and 2nd class. He was nominated for the Order of Glory 1st class, but did not receive it.

== Postwar ==
Abdurakhmanov served in the army until 1946 when he was demobilized and exiled to Central Asia as a person of the deported Chechen nation. The "nationality" entry of his personal details proved to be more important than his heroic military deeds. After living in exile in Frunze he returned to Chechnya in 1967, where he worked as driver, combiner, food industry operative, and master of a geological exploration drilling crew. In 1996 he was belatedly awarded the title Hero of the Russian Federation, with his nomination for the Order of Glory 1st class having been rejected without just cause. After retirement he moved to the city of Argun, where he died on 28 March 2000.

== See also ==
- List of Heroes of the Russian Federation
