= Odes Baysultanov =

Russian politician

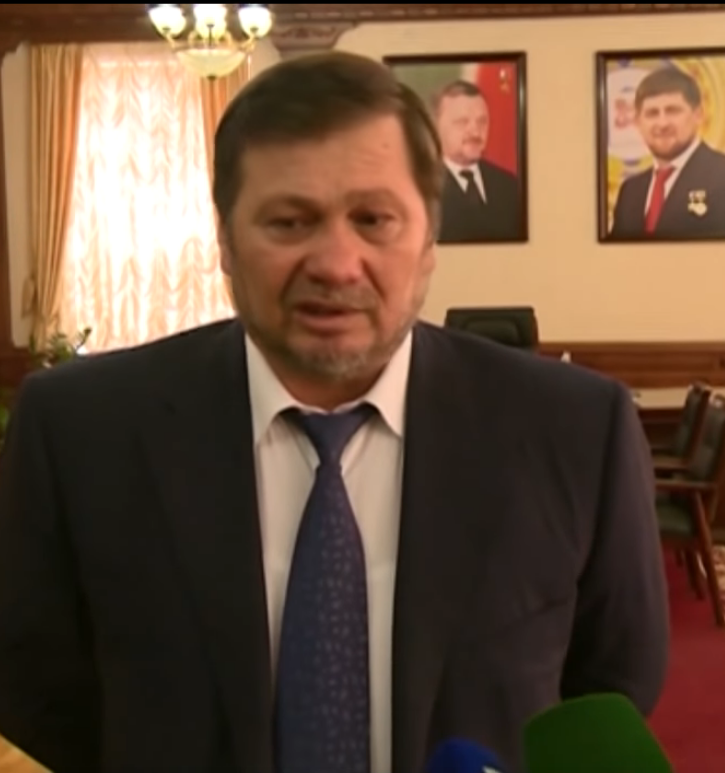
Odes Baysultanov in 2014

Odes Khasayevich Baysultanov (Russian: Одес Хасаевич Байсултанов; born 17 January 1965) is a Russian statesman and politician, most notable for his tenure as Chairman of the Republic of Chechnya from 2007 to 2012. Baysultanov currently serves as the Deputy Minister of Sports of the Russian Federation, in office since 11 February 2020.

He has the federal state civilian service rank of 1st class Active State Councillor of the Russian Federation.

== Biography ==
Baysultanov was born on 17 January 1965 in the village of Beleorechie (now Ilashan-Yurt) of the Gudermes region of the Checheno-Ingush Autonomous Soviet Socialist Republic. Baysultanov graduated from the Chechen State University in 1994 with a degree in physics and mathematics, before graduating again in 2005 with a degree in state and municipal administration.

Baysultanov first began working for the Government of the Chechen Republic of Ichkeria in 1992, where he held the positions of chief specialist of mechanization and electrification of the Ministry of Agriculture. From June 2004 to March 2006, Baysultanov was Executive Director of the President and Government of the Chechen Republic. He then went on to serve as First Deputy Chairman of the Chechen Government (March 2006 - April 2007), before serving as Chairman of the Chechen Republic from 10 April 2007 to 17 May 2012.

Baysultanov has also worked for the Government of Russia, holding the positions of Minister for the North Caucasus (April 2016 - January 2020), and Deputy Minister of Sports.
