= Tumso Abdurakhmanov =

Chechen blogger and dissident (born 1985)

- Тумсо IабдурахьмангIеран
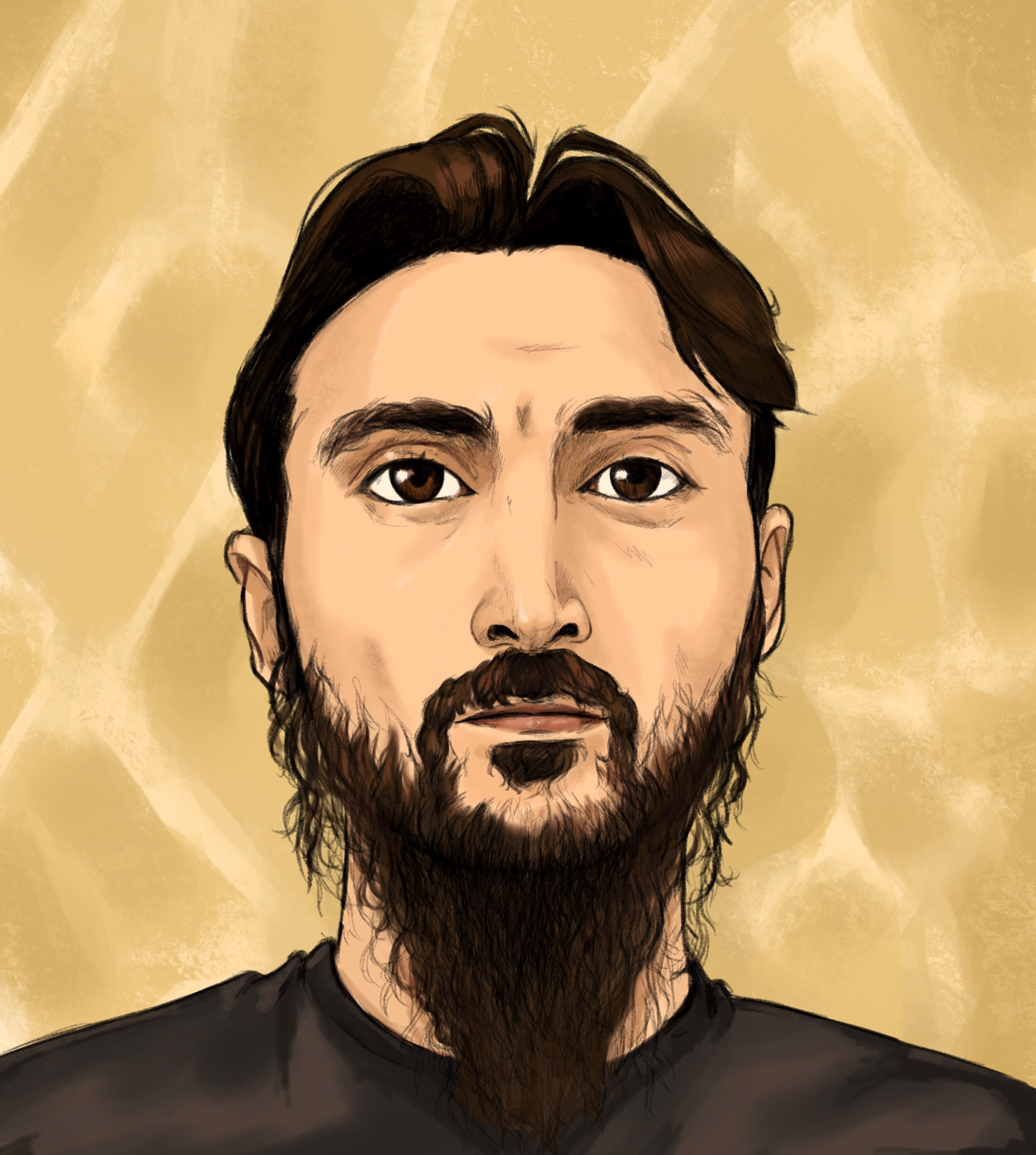

Deputy Director of Telecommunications of Chechnya
- In office 30 March 2011 – 17 June 2015

Chairman of the Voice of Chechnya
- Incumbent
- Assumed office 29 October 2022

Personal details
- Born: Tumso Umaltovich Abdurakhmanov; 19 December 1985 (age 40) Grozny, Checheno-Ingush ASSR, Russian SFSR, Soviet Union
- Party: NCChP (2009–2011); Progress Party (2011–2015); Independent (2015–2022); Voice of Chechnya (since 2022)
- Education: Grozny State Oil Technical University
- Occupation: Blogger

Tumso Umaltovich Abdurakhmanov (Russian: Тумсо́ Ума́лтович Абдурахма́нов; Chechen: Тумсо Умалтан IабдурахьмангIеран; born 19 December 1985) is a Chechen blogger and dissident from Chechnya. He has advocated for the independence of Chechnya on YouTube and opposes the pro-Kremlin Head of the Chechen Republic, Ramzan Kadyrov. Throughout his ascent to prominence, Abdurakhmanov has been a target of several personal assaults, including assassination attempts, both in Russia and abroad. This led to him choosing to remain in Sweden in the autumn of 2019, and eventually to ask for political asylum there. Tumso has been granted Swedish asylum in October 2021. By that time, he became the most popular Chechen YouTuber.

According to Sweden's state radio, Sveriges Radio, 9 December 2022 Munich security spokesman Loren Lafleur claims that Abdurakhmanov is still alive and that there is no reason to believe otherwise. Tumso will be in the German court to testify for his brother who was also the victim of attempted murder.

== Early life ==
Abdurakhmanov was born in Grozny, then the capital of the Checheno-Ingush Autonomous Soviet Socialist Republic on 19 December 1985. His father, Umalt, served 18 years in prison for anti-Soviet activities. In 2010, he graduated from the Grozny State Oil Technical University. He was hired as an engineer for the federal enterprise Electrosviaz, of which he became deputy head. On 9 June 2013, he created his first YouTube channel under the pseudonym Abu-Saddam Shishani, and started the channel Abu-Saddam Shishani [LIVE] on 1 April 2017. By November 2019, the two channels had gained 200,000 and 60,000 subscribers, respectively.

== Persecution and emigration ==
On 4 November 2015, Abdurakhmanov's vehicle was stopped at an intersection in Grozny by the city's pro-Kremlin former mayor, Islam Kadyrov. He was taken to Kadyrov's residence, where his mobile phone was searched and internet memes mocking local politics were discovered. Upon discovery that Abdurakhmanov adhered to Sunni Islam, Kadyrov took him to meet with clergy who allowed his release on the condition that he return with other dissidents.

The next morning, Abdurakhmanov took his wife, children, mother, and brother to neighboring Georgia in an attempt to seek asylum. The government of Chechnya accused him of fleeing to Syria and joining the Islamic State and subsequently issued an arrest warrant for him. To defend himself from such accusations, he took to YouTube to speak publicly and denounce the abuses of Ramzan Kadyrov's regime.

On 31 October 2016, Georgia declared his case to fall under the scope of the Convention Relating to the Status of Refugees but rejected his asylum application on the grounds that it was "contrary to the interests of the country". On 11 July 2017, he fled with his family to Poland, where he applied for asylum at the Warsaw Chopin Airport. Wanted by Interpol and registered with the Schengen Information System, he spent six months in a detention center in Przemyśl. After a review, Interpol removed him from their database on 16 August 2017. The Internal Security Agency of Poland accepted all asylum claims in his family, but not his, considering him a threat to the country. In June 2019, despite support from Amnesty International, Human Rights Watch, and Memorial, he was ordered by Polish authorities to return to Russia with threat of forced deportation.

On 10 April 2018, Abdurakhmanov claimed that his uncles were arrested in Chechnya. The next month, the TV channel Grozny broadcast a report in which his relatives asked him to stop criticizing authorities and to return to Russia. On 22 August 2018, chairman of the Parliament of the Chechen Republic Magomed Daudov, often known by the nickname Lord, called Abdurakhmanov via WhatsApp in an unsuccessful attempt to receive his location. The nearly three hour-long conversation was recorded and posted on YouTube, where it quickly accumulated hundreds of thousands of views.

Beginning in March 2019, Abdurakhmanov debated against journalist Maksim Shevchenko about Ramzan Kadyrov. In the debate, he declared Kadyrov to be a traitor to the Chechen people. In response, Magomed Daudov threatened the blogger with death, telling him to "make sure the safety chain is hooked up. [...] We won't let you say whatever you want. Poland is not that far away. No place is, all places are accessible. We will hold you accountable, with God's permission".

== Assassination attempt and death reports ==
While Abdurakhmanov was facing deportation from Poland, Daudov promised to "meet him at the airport with flowers". However, he instead travelled to Sweden in December 2019 and requested asylum, but his claim was rejected in accordance with the Dublin Regulation. While he was appealing the decision, he was attacked in his home in Gävle by a stranger with a hammer on 27 February 2020. However, he managed to get to safety and call the police, and the assailant and accomplice were promptly arrested. During the investigation of the attack, he was given legal permission to reside in Sweden. Following the investigation of the Swedish Security Service, the Gävle district court sentenced the attacker to ten years in prison, while the accomplice was given eight, in addition to lifelong expulsion from Swedish soil. On 1 April 2021, a court of appeal increased the attacker's sentence to twelve years, while the accomplice's sentence was reduced to one year and six months. Following the trial, Sweden's Ministry for Foreign Affairs summoned Russia's ambassador in Stockholm for an explanation of the attack due to alleged links between the assailant and the Chechen government. On 6 October 2021, Abdurakhmanov was granted asylum in Sweden.

In December 2021, Chechen authorities kidnapped dozens of family members of Chechen militants who had taken refuge abroad, including nine of Abdurakhmanov's, in an attempt to silence the dissident voices under the threat of physical abuse. Abdurakhmanov refused to comply with the authorities and his relatives were later released.

In the spring of 2022, Abdurakhmanov denounced Russia's invasion of Ukraine. On 2 November 2022, he published a post on Telegram Messenger announcing the establishment of a political party, Noxçiyçönan Az (Voice of Chechnya). The final publication on his YouTube channel appeared on 7 November 2022 and his final Telegram post was published on 30 November.

On 5 December 2022, Tumso Abdurakhmanov's associates claimed that the blogger had died, although he had not been heard from for 4 days. Some sources announced that he was shot on the night of December 1 by a group of unidentified people. These reports were however overturned by a German criminal court in which the blogger had testified in November 2022, and which stated that to its knowledge, Tumso Abdurakhmanov was still alive, moreover, many in the Chechen diaspora reacted with skepticism, and his death has not yet been confirmed by Swedish police.

On 20 February 2023, Abdurakhmanov made his first public statements following the rumors of his death.

On 31 August 2023, the Munich state court convicted a Russian man of plotting the murder of Abdurakhmanov's brother on orders from Ramzan Kadyrov and sentenced the defendant to 10 years in prison.

== See also ==
- Yangulbaev case
