= Medni Kadyrova =

Wife of Ramzan Kadyrov

Medni Musaevna Kadyrova
- Медни Мусаевна Кадырова
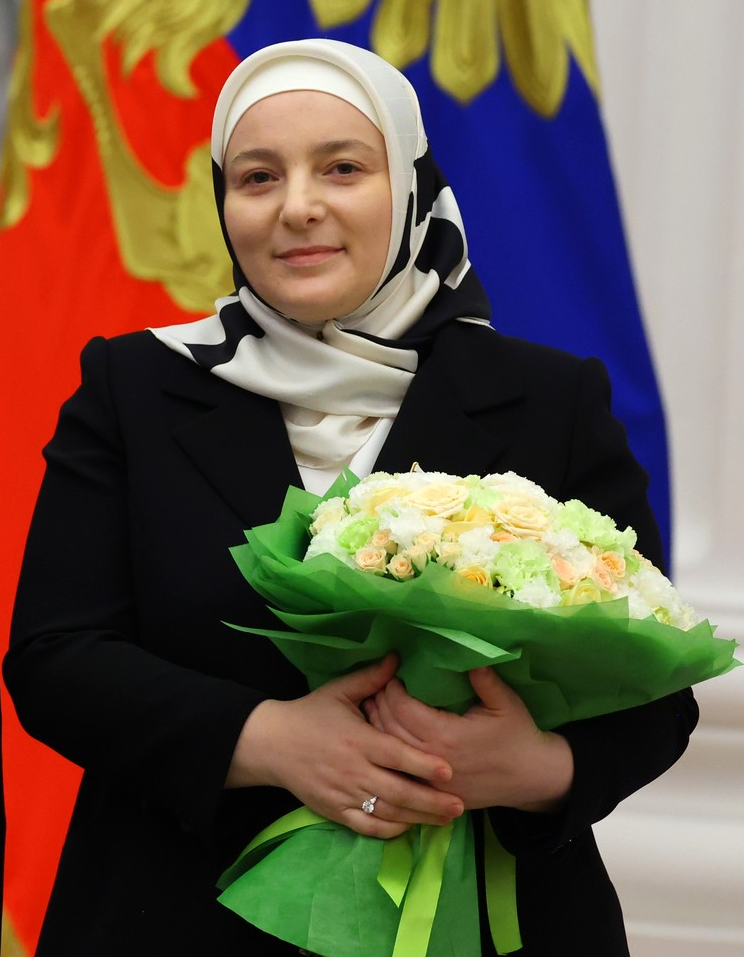
- Medni in 2023
- Born: 7 September 1978 (age 48); Tsentaroy, Shalinsky District, Checheno-Ingush Autonomous Soviet Socialist Republic, USSR
- Citizenship: Soviet Union; Russia
- Occupations: Public figure, fashion designer
- Spouse: Ramzan Kadyrov
- Children: 14 including Adam Kadyrov
- Relatives: Akhmad Kadyrov (father-in-law)
- Awards: Mother Heroine; Order of Friendship

Medni Musaevna Kadyrova (née Aidamirova: born 7 September 1978), is a Chechen and Russian public figure, fashion designer, and the first wife of the Head of the Chechen Republic, Ramzan Kadyrov.

== Early life and education ==
Medni was born on 7 September 1978 in the Checheno-Ingush Autonomous Soviet Socialist Republic. Medni attended the same school as her future husband, Ramzan Kadyrov, who she later married at the age of 17 in 1996.

== Businesses ==
Since 2009 Medni was employed as a businesswoman and fashion designer and is the founder of the Firdaws Fashion House, a fashion studio which specializes in Islamic clothing. Medni's fashion company was later taken over by her daughter Aishat Kadyrova. Medni is the owner of Trade City, the entity which owns Chechnya's largest shopping malls including both the Berkat and Grozny-City Mall. Medina is also the vice president of the Akhmad Kadyrov Foundation, a Chechen aid society named in honor of her father-in-law, Akhmad Kadyrov.

== Sanctions ==
According to the United States Department of State, Ramzan Kadyrov is currently a sanctioned individual under Section 7031(c) of the Department of State for known human rights violations in Chechnya. These sanctions are also applied to Medni and her daughters Aishat Kadyrova and Karina "Khadizhat" Kadyrova due to their association with Ramzan. Medni is also sanctioned by Japan due to "numerous gross human rights violations".

== Personal life ==
Medni and Ramzan have had a total of 14 children, although this number is disputed due to the fact that Ramzan is polygamous and is an open critic of civil registration of marriages.

== Awards ==
Vladimir Putin awarded Mendi with the Mother Heroine award in 2022. Medni is also a recipient of the Order of Friendship and the Order of Akhmad Kadyrov.
