= Nabi Abdurakhmanov =

Uzbek producer and director (born 1958)

- Born: Nabi Abdurakhmanov; November 7, 1958 (age 67); Tashkent, Uzbekistan
- Occupations: Theatrical Producer, Director
- Years active: 1955–present
- Children: 3
- Awards: Honored Artist of the Republic of Uzbekistan; Medal of Pushkin

Nabi Abdurakhmanov (born 7 November 1958, Tashkent, UzSSR) is an Uzbekistani theatre producer and director.

== Biography ==
Nabi Abdurakhmanov has lived in the United States since 2016. He gives masterclasses and produces productions at the Stella Adler Studio (Phaeton by M. Milligan), NYU Tisch School of the Arts (Three Sisters by A. Chekhov), and York College of CUNY.

== Career ==
=== Theatre ===
Nabi Abdurakhmanov was the artistic director of the Youth Theatre of Uzbekistan from 1991 to 2016. Abdurakhmanov was a professor of acting and directing at the Uzbekistan State Institute of Arts and Culture from 1980. He was also the chairman of the Uzbek Centre of the International Association of Theatres for Children and Youth from 1997.

=== Theatre director works ===
- 1998 – A Girl with Matches, after Hans Christian Andersen. Moscow Pushkin Drama Theatre
- 2016 – Worlds in Collision by Iddo Netanyahu. Academic Drama Theatre, Vladimir, Russia
- 2018 – Vox in deserto by Did Tal. Youth Theatre of Uzbekistan
- 2019 – Sodom and Gomorrah XXI by Djalol Yusupov. Chekhov International Theatre Festival

=== Film acting ===
- 1972 – The Testament of the Old Master (mini‑series) as Sadik Sabirov
- 1991 – Step to the Right ... Step to the Left
