= Yangulbaev case =

2022 sociopolitical scandal in Russia

The Yangulbaev case (Russian: Дело Янгулбаевых) is a socio-political scandal that erupted in Russia in early 2022. Lawyer of the Committee for the Prevention of Torture Abubakar Yangulbaev announced the disappearance of several dozen of his relatives in Chechnya. After that, the Chechen security forces forcibly took his mother Zarema Musayeva (wife of a retired federal judge) from Nizhny Novgorod to Grozny, where she became a defendant in a criminal case and was sent to a pre-trial detention center. Abubakar's brother, Ibragim, was put on the federal wanted list, his father and sister hastily left Russia. The head of Chechnya, Ramzan Kadyrov, said that members of the Yangulbaev family should be detained and punished, “and if they resist, then they should be destroyed as accomplices of terrorists”; he later demanded from foreign governments that the fugitives be returned to Chechnya.

Abubakar Yangulbaev became a human rights activist and lawyer for the Committee for the Prevention of Torture. He regularly made sharp statements about the leadership of Chechnya, about the persecution to which his family was subjected. He was suspected of running the opposition telegram channel 1ADAT, and in 2020 Abubakar's house was searched, but this had no consequences.

On February 2, 2022, a rally was held in Grozny, the participants of which burned and trampled on the portraits of the Yangulbaevs; according to official figures, there were about 400,000 protesters, compared to less than 300,000 inhabitants in Grozny.

The European Union called on the Russian authorities to immediately release Musaeva.

Mussaeva was originally sentenced to 15 days of administrative detention for "petty hooliganism", after which she was then charged for assaulting a government official; she was later also charged with fraud.

Following Mussaeva's disappearance, a spokesperson for the Kremlin appeared to deny that the Chechen police had abducted her, stating the account of her abduction sounded "fictitious".

Mussaeva is serving a five-year prison sentence on false charges brought in retaliation for her exiled sons' public opposition to Ramzan Kadyrov. She was found guilty on 4 July 2023 at a court in Grozny and sentenced to detention at a penal colony. That same day, masked individuals attacked Novaya Gazeta journalist Elena Milashina and lawyer Alexander Nemov, who had been attending the trial.

Mussaeva has repeatedly been refused parole. On 5 March 2024, the Fifth Cassation Court in Pyatigorsk reduced Mussaeva's sentence to 4 years and nine months. She is serving her sentence at a penal colony in Argun, Chechnya.

In September 2024, the Chechen Supreme Court reduced her sentence by six months and transferred her to a colony settlement rather than a correctional colony.

It has been alleged that in detention Mussaeva has been given inadequate healthcare pertaining to her diabetes which hampers her mobility. In October 2024 she was admitted to a Chechen endicronology dispensary. In April 2024, the state medical commission in Chechnya downgraded Mussaeva's diagnosis to "diabetes without complications" despite her having been admitted to hospital the previous month due to a decline in her vision and lumps appearing on her body; human rights organisations reported that the downgrade was part of the "systemic abuse" Mussaeva had experienced in prison.

In November 2024, Russian authorities opened up a new investigation into Mussaeva, accusing her of "disorganising the activities of the penal colony" after being accused of assaulting a Federal Penitentiary Service officer. Her sentence could be extended by an additional five years after it was alleged she had scratched the neck of an officer while being transported to a hospital appointment. Mussaeva denied the incident and her lawyer stated the officer had fabricated the incident. Her request to be released from pre-trial detention was declined.

The International Federation for Human Rights, in addition to its Russian member organisations the Anti-Discrimination Centre Memorial, Human Rights Defence Centre Memorial, and Citizens' Watch, called on Russian authorities to drop the charges against Mussaeva, ensure her immediate release, and to cease its persecution of critics of Kadyrov and his relatives.

Team Against Torture called for Mussaeva to be released and to receive proper medical treatment, stating her ongoing detention reflected a broader pattern of repression in Chechnya.

The European Court of Human Rights ordered Russia to pay damages to Mussaeva and her family over her arbitrary arrest.

Amnesty International urged Russian authorities to intervene following Mussaeva's abduction.
