= Olga Alexandrovna Sadovskaya =

Russian lawyer and human rights activist

- Olga Alexandrovna Sadovskaya
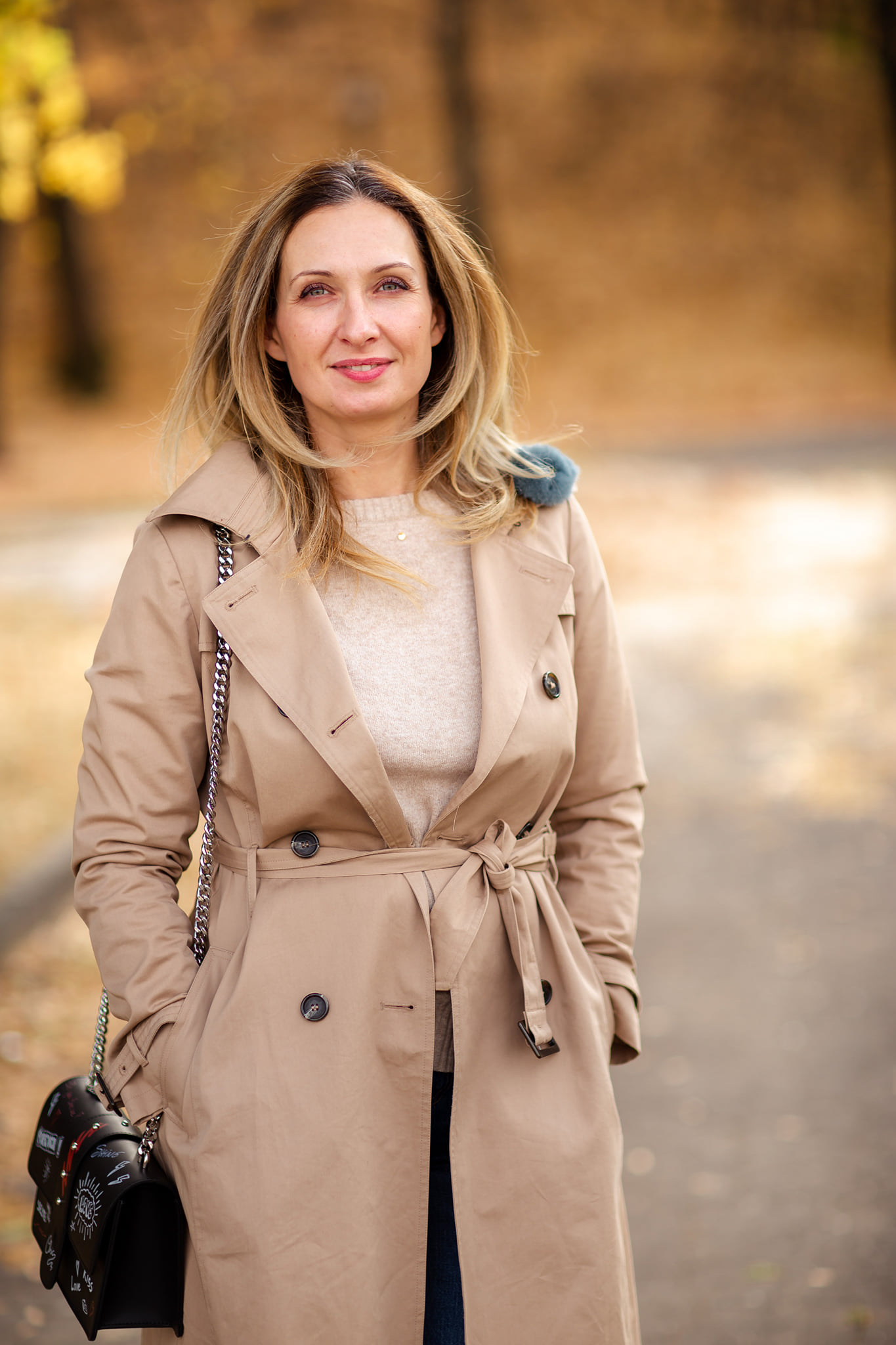
- Born: October 25, 1980 (age 45); Gorky, RSFSR, USSR
- Education: Lobachevsky State University
- Organization: Crew Against Torture

Olga Alexandrovna Sadovskaya (born October 25, 1980, Gorky, RSFSR, USSR) is a Russian lawyer, human rights activist, deputy head, and head of the International Legal Protection Department of the Crew Against Torture, a Russian human rights organization specializing in investigations of torture cases. Since 2004, she has been a co-author of alternative reports to the UN Committee Against Torture. Since 2018, she has been a member of the Board of the World Organization Against Torture. Since 2021, she has been a member of the Board of the Conference of International NGOs of the Council of Europe. Since 2022, she has been a member of the Council of Russian Human Rights Defenders.

== Early life and education ==
In 2003, Sagovskaya graduated from Lobachevsky State University of Nizhni Novgorod with a specialization in International Public Law, defending the first thesis in Russia on the prohibition of torture and the practice of the European Court of Human Rights on this issue. In 2004, she completed her studies at the University of Amsterdam and earned an LLM (Master of Law) degree specializing in International Human Rights Protection.

== Human Rights activities ==
In 2002, Olga Sadovskaya became a volunteer at the Committee Against Torture (now the Crew Against Torture). Starting in 2003, she worked there as a lawyer, conducting analytical research on torture in Russia, handling cases in the European Court of Human Rights, and providing training on handling cases in international bodies.

Since 2004, Olga Sadovskaya has been a co-author of alternative reports to the UN Committee Against Torture on compliance with the Convention against Torture and other Cruel, Inhuman, or Degrading Treatment or Punishment.

In 2009, she gave a lecture on human rights protection issues at Lobachevsky State University. In 2009, Olga Sadovskaya participated in the international conference on human rights organized by the Human Rights Information and Documentation Centre (HURIDOCS) in Geneva, where she presented information on the situation regarding torture prevention in Russia.

From 2016 to 2019, she was a member of the Public Monitoring Commission of Nizhny Novgorod Region. In 2017, she took part in the international conference "Defending Dissent: Civil Society and Human Rights in the Global Crackdown," organized by the Robert L. Bernstein Institute for Human Rights at New York University School of Law.

On March 28, 2019, Olga Sadovskaya participated in the international conference "Crimes Against Human Dignity: Interaction of International and National Means of Protection", organized in Moscow by the Council of Europe, the Federal Chamber of Advocates of the Russian Federation, and the International Commission of Jurists. At this conference, Olga Sadovskaya spoke about the necessity of prohibiting torture in the national legislation.

From 2021 to 2022, as part of the Oak Human Rights Fellowship program, she taught two courses at Colby College in Waterville, USA: "Incarceration and Human Rights" and "The European Court as a Trendsetter for Global Human Rights Standards". In 2023, Olga Sadovskaya became the only co-author from Russia of the Second Edition of the Istanbul Protocol. As of October 2023, Olga Sadovskaya served as a trainer for the Human Rights Information and Documentation System HURIDOCS, conducting training seminars on the standards of the European Court of Human Rights for lawyers, law enforcement officials, and prosecutors.

=== Cases in the European Court of Human Rights ===
From 2002 to 2015, Olga and her colleagues from the Crew Against Torture submitted 84 complaints to the European Court of Human Rights, resulting in convictions for torture for over a hundred police officers and compensation for victims totaling nearly 46 million rubles (700,000 US dollars). In addition, the organization was involved in the evacuation of torture victims from Chechnya. In 2018, two cases led by lawyers from the Torture Prevention Team were included in the collection "Precedents of the European Court of Human Rights: 20 Most Important Cases that Changed the Russian Legal System": the cases of Mikheev and Lyapin. Olga Sadovskaya personally represented the interests of over 300 torture victims at the European Court.

==== Lapunov v. Russia ====
On March 15, 2017, Maxim Lapunov was detained by the police in Grozny and taken to a police station where he was subjected to torture. In May 2019, Lapunov filed a complaint with the European Court of Human Rights (ECHR), claiming that his case had been improperly investigated by Russian authorities. Olga Sadovskaya represented him before the ECHR. On September 12, 2023, the ECHR recognized that the applicant had been "detained and subjected to ill-treatment by state agents," reaching the level of torture, which was committed "solely because of his sexual orientation." The court awarded him compensation for moral damages amounting to 52,000 euros.

==== Tepsurkaev v. Russia ====
On September 6, 2020, Salman Tepsurkaev was abducted and subjected to torture in Gelendzhik. Witnesses reported that the abductors showed identification documents of the police officers. In October 2021, the European Court of Human Rights, after reviewing the case, concluded that Russian authorities were responsible for violating Articles 3 and 5 of the European Convention on Human Rights - "prohibition of torture" and "right to liberty and security," recognizing Mr. Tepsurkaev as a victim of abduction and torture and awarding compensation to his wife, who was recognized as a victim.

"The ECHR recognized that Salman became a victim of abduction and torture by state agents, namely Chechen law enforcement officers. He was unlawfully deprived of his freedom and subjected to cruel and degrading treatment, which was captured on video. The court found that the state failed to protect Salman." - Olga Sadovskaya.

==== Novoselov v. Russia ====
On April 27, 2004, Alexander Novoselov, a resident of Nizhny Novgorod, was abducted by police officers and subjected to torture to give testimony in the case of Oleg Sorokin, the then-General Director of a group of companies "Stolitsa Nizhny." Novoselov filed a statement to the prosecutor's office requesting the opening of a criminal case. However, the investigative body eventually refused to initiate a criminal case against the police officers. The prosecutor's office concluded that the incident in the forest was an operational experiment conducted by officers of the Main Department of Internal Affairs for Nizhny Novgorod Region. In May 2005, Novoselov turned to the Committee Against Torture. On December 24, 2005, lawyers from the Committee Against Torture filed a complaint with the ECHR on behalf of Alexander Novoselov, and it was accepted for consideration in 2008. On November 28, 2013, the ECHR recognized that Novoselov had been tortured by state representatives, and the investigation conducted by the prosecutor's investigation was "superficial" and "formalistic." The European Court ordered Russia to pay Novoselov 27,500 euros.

==== Anoshin v. Russia ====
In July 2002, Alexander Anoshin was taken to a medical sobering-up station in the Soviet District of Nizhny Novgorod, where he died on the same day due to asphyxiation. A criminal case was initiated because it was discovered that the man could not have received those injuries on his own. In February 2004, Elena Anoshina, the sister of the deceased, turned to the Committee Against Torture. As a result, the prosecutor's office initiated a case under Article 111, Part 4 of the Russian Criminal Code (infliction of grievous bodily harm resulting in the death of the victim due to negligence). The case was suspended 13 times. In 2005, human rights defenders filed a complaint with the ECHR, and suspects - police officers Alexey Maslov, Evgeny Ageev, and Andrey Antonov - appeared in the case. In 2008, a Russian court sentenced Maslov to 14 years in a strict regime colony for Article 105 of the Russian Criminal Code (murder) and Part 3 of Article 286 of the Russian Criminal Code (exceeding official powers with the use of violence). The case against Ageev and Antonov, who were accused under Part 2 of Article 293 of the Russian Criminal Code (negligence resulting in the death of the victim), was terminated due to the statute of limitations. On March 26, 2019, the ECHR awarded Elena Anoshina compensation in the amount of 36,600 euros, establishing that the Russian Federation violated Alexander Anoshin's right to life, and the investigation into his murder was ineffective.

==== Dmitrievskiy v. Russia ====
In the mid-2000s, Dmitrievskiy led the organization "Society of Russian-Chechen Friendship," which monitored human rights violations in the North Caucasus. He was also the chief editor of the newspaper "Pravo-Zashchita," which was mainly distributed in his hometown of Nizhny Novgorod with a circulation of 5,000 copies. In 2004, the newspaper published appeals from Chechen separatist leaders Ahmed Zakayev and Aslan Maskhadov. In these texts, they accused the Russian leadership of instigating war and terrorism in Chechnya. In January 2005, the Nizhny Novgorod prosecutor's office initiated a criminal case against Dmitrievsky for calling for extremist activities (Article 280 of the Russian Criminal Code), finding calls for the violent overthrow of the constitutional order in these materials. The charges were later reclassified as calls for hatred or enmity (Article 282 of the Russian Criminal Code). In February 2006, the Soviet District Court of Nizhny Novgorod sentenced Dmitrievsky to two years of conditional imprisonment with a four-year probation period. In the same year, Dmitrievsky appealed to the ECHR. The case was initiated after filing a complaint about violations of Article 10 of the European Convention on Freedom of Expression, as well as violations of Articles 6 and 13, which concern fair trial and effective legal remedies. On October 3, 2017, the ECHR ruled that Dmitrievsky's publications did not contain calls for the overthrow of the system or incitement to interethnic hatred and awarded him compensation of 13,600 euros. This was the first time the ECHR made a decision on a criminal case on extremism in Russia.

==== A. v. Russia ====
This case was initiated by a complaint filed with the European Court of Human Rights against the Russian Federation in accordance with Article 34 of the Convention for the Protection of Human Rights and Fundamental Freedoms by a Russian citizen, A., on April 14, 2009. The Section Chairman granted the applicant's request for anonymity. Initially, the applicant was represented by her mother, and later by Olga Sadovskaya. The applicant claimed that the Russian authorities violated her rights under the convention by carrying out her father's violent detention in her presence in 2008 when she was 9 years old. In 2019, the ECHR deemed this complaint admissible, ruling that there had been a violation of Article 3 of the Convention in both its material and procedural aspects, and awarded 25,000 euros as compensation for moral damage.

==== S.K. v. Russia ====
This case was initiated by a complaint filed with the ECHR against the Russian Federation in 2012. The applicant, a 20-year-old future mother at the time of the events, was forced by her parents to have an abortion after her partner and the future father of the child were arrested on suspicion of a serious crime. The medical intervention was performed by a duty doctor at a state hospital. In 2022, the court ruled that the respondent state had not properly investigated the incident and had direct responsibility for what had happened, and awarded the applicant 19,500 euros in compensation.

==== V.K. v. Russia ====
The applicant claimed that at the age of 4, he had been subjected to cruel treatment by the staff of a state kindergarten. Medical experts established a causal link between the cruel treatment of the applicant by kindergarten staff and his current neurological disorder. In 2017, the ECHR ruled that there had been a violation of Article 3 of the Convention in its material part in connection with the cruel treatment of the applicant by kindergarten staff. It also ruled that there had been a violation of Article 3 of the Convention in its procedural part in connection with the authorities' failure to conduct an effective investigation into the applicant's complaints of cruel treatment. The ECHR ordered Russia to pay 3,000 euros for pecuniary damage and 25,000 euros for non-pecuniary damage.

==== Al-Tbakhy v. Russia ====
Visam Al-Tbakhy was detained on October 26, 2018, in Nizhny Novgorod and isolated for further deportation from Russia. Palestinian Visam Al-Tbakhy became a Russian citizen in 2001 and officially changed his documents within the prescribed period. In 2017, due to violations in the issuance of a Russian passport, the Federal Migration Service considered the document invalid and confiscated it along with the foreign passport. The court annulled Al-Tbakhy's Russian citizenship. He was denied regaining citizenship. It was decided to deport him for "ensuring the security of the state" for 30 years. Al-Tbakhy was deported from Russia in 2019. In this case, lawyers from the Committee Against Torture (CAT) identified several serious violations of several articles of the European Convention and filed a complaint with the ECHR. In 2022, the ECHR ruled that there had been a violation of Article 8 of the Convention and ordered Russia to pay Al-Tabahy 7,500 euros in compensation for non-pecuniary damage.

==== Adzhigitova and Others v. Russia ====
On June 4, 2005, about a hundred unknown servicemen of the Russian Ministry of Defense stationed in Chechnya carried out an attack on the residents of the village of Borozdinovskaya in the Shelkovsky district of the Chechen Republic. Later, the authorities of the Chechen Republic officially admitted that soldiers of the "Vostok" battalion of the Russian Ministry of Defense, which was at that time commanded by Hero of Russian Federation Sulim Yamadayev, took part in the operation. In 2007, a complaint was filed with the ECHR on behalf of 96 residents of Borozdinovskaya, which was later combined with another application by fellow villagers. As a result, 126 Russian citizens born between 1930 and 2014 acted as applicants. They claimed that the military had illegally "searched their homes, arrested them, subjected them to cruel treatment, and killed locals." In addition, according to the plaintiffs, four houses were set on fire, and 11 men were abducted. Finally, the plaintiffs claimed that discrimination based on their national origin (Avars) took place. They alleged that the Russian authorities did not conduct an effective investigation of what had happened. 97 applicants were represented by lawyers Olga Sadovskaya and R. Rajabov from the Committee Against Torture (CAT). The ECHR ruled that the following articles of the European Convention on Human Rights had been violated: Article 2 (right to life), Article 3 (prohibition of torture, inhuman or degrading treatment), Article 8 (right to respect for private and family life), Article 13 (right to an effective remedy), Article 14 (prohibition of discrimination), and also Article 1 of Protocol No. 1 (protection of property). In addition, the ECHR found that Russia had violated Article 38 (procedure for considering the case). The total compensation amount to the victims was 1,842,000 euros.

== Awards and honors ==
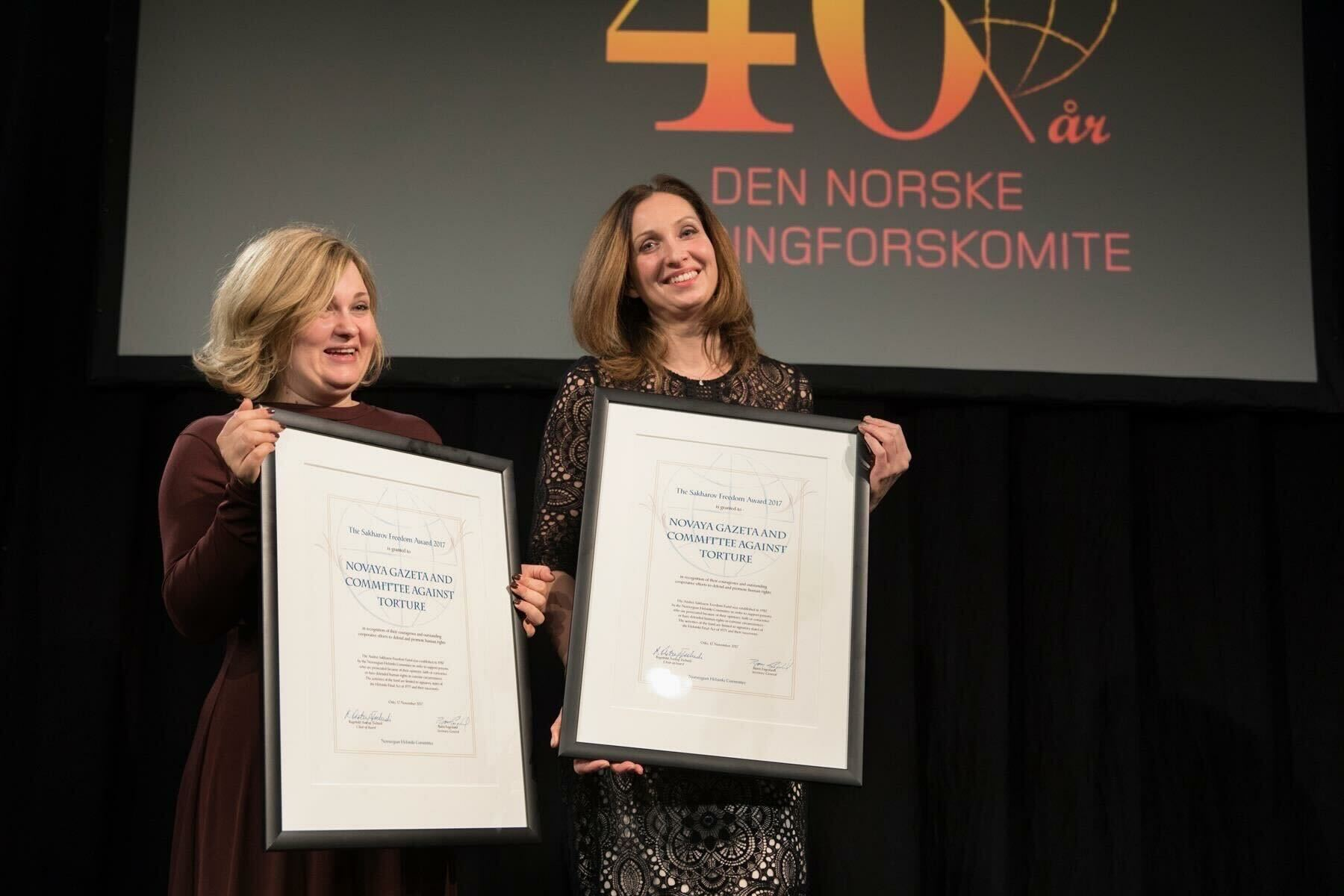
In 2017, Olga Sadovskaya (right) received the Helsinki Committee's Andrei Sakharov Freedom Prize on behalf of the Committee against Torture together with Elena Milashina (left) on behalf of the Russian newspaper Novaya Gazeta

In 2017, Olga Sadovskaya, who was representing the Committee against Torture, was awarded the Andrei Sakharov Freedom Prize by the Norwegian Helsinki Committee for outstanding efforts in combatting torture in Russia. In 2018, Olga Sadovskaya, along with journalist Elena Milashina from Novaya Gazeta and Svetlana Gannushkina, founder of the Memorial Human Rights Center, was nominated for the Nobel Peace Prize. They were nominated by Norwegian Socialist Left Party parliamentarian Petter Eide. Ludmila Alexeyeva, the chair of the Moscow Helsinki Group, was also on the list. In 2023, Olga Sadovskaya received an award from the Moscow Helsinki Group for her contributions to the defense of the rights of prisoners and other vulnerable groups.

== Pressure and threats ==
On June 6, 2011, Olga Sadovskaya received notification that all of her credit cards had been blocked due to suspicious withdrawals. On June 8, she was invited to the prosecutor's office of the Nizhny Novgorod district for a conversation with the senior assistant prosecutor regarding the Civil Forum EU-Russia, of which she was a member of the Coordination Council. On the same day, unknown individuals removed the license plates from her car. Sadovskaya regarded these events as local excesses in anticipation of the EU-Russia Summit, which opened in Nizhny Novgorod on June 9, 2011. In parallel with the official summit, the Coordination Council of the Civil Forum EU-Russia had planned to hold a press conference in which Olga Sadovskaya was supposed to participate. The event was scheduled for June 9 at the Rosbalt agency's office in Nizhny Novgorod, but the agency refused to host it the day before. On June 21, 2011, before Olga Sadovskaya's trip to Strasbourg, all the fences near her house were painted with texts containing insults and threats directed at her. On April 28, 2023, in Nizhny Novgorod, police officers conducted early morning searches in the offices of the human rights organization "Crew against Torture," which Olga Sadovskaya is associated with. These searches were related to a criminal case initiated against the "Crew against Torture".
