= Feldtelefon 50 =

The Feldtelephone 50 (50 FTf) is a field telephone used in the Swiss Army. It takes its name from the year 1950, in which it was produced for the first time.

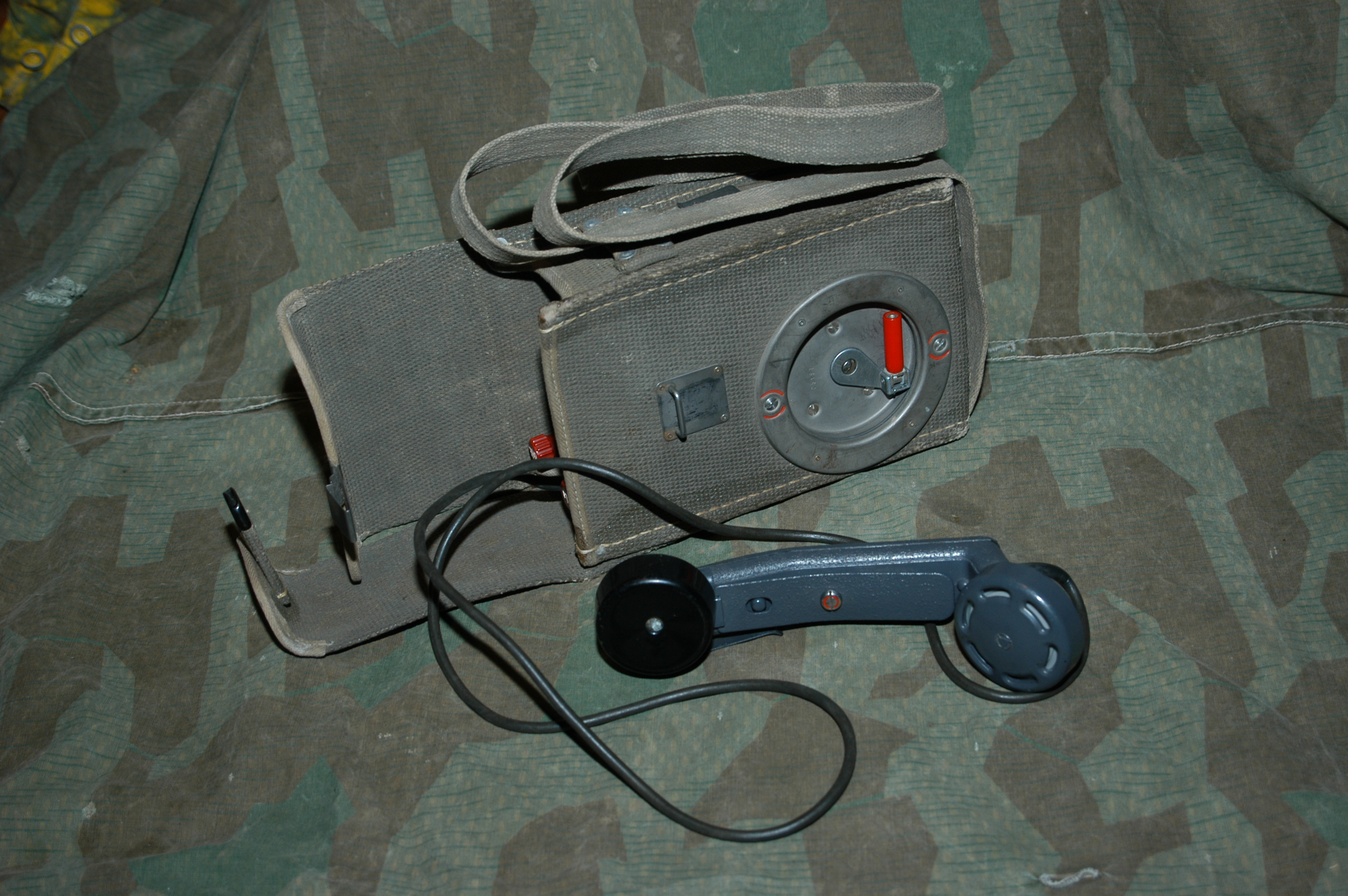
Feldtelefon 50

== Parts ==
The field telephone 50 is packed in a rectangular box-shaped protective casing of green canvas on which a strap is secured from the same material. Inside is the actual phone that is powered by a 1.5-volt battery. A standard handset with earpiece and microphone is used (called Mikrotel). The canvas surrounding the phone has a circular opening for the crank, through the actuation of the ring signal is triggered at the other end. The ring signal is generated by a hand crank. Two wire terminals at the upper end of the apparatus are available for attaching the wire ends of telephone lines.

== Use ==
The field telephone 50 is used by all communication troops of the Swiss Army for both point-to-point connections and landlines.

For the first variant, two field telephones are connected with telephone wire.

In the second version the phone is connected to lines specially reserved for the army. Such a linked phone is accessible from any telephone. When connected to army common Switchboard 85 all phone numbers can be called.

If only a normal telephone connection is available, the phone can be coupled with the supplementary Army dealing phone 53 (ATF53). The ATF 53 is technically identical to the FTF50. However, it is not weather resistant and more suitable for bunker cabling due to its metal housing.

== Reasons for using ==
The advantages of the field telephone 50 is its compact and lightweight design, its ability to withstand heavy loads through bumps, blows or weather. It is an important complement to other means such as military communications the radio.
