= Field telephone =

Wired portable military phones

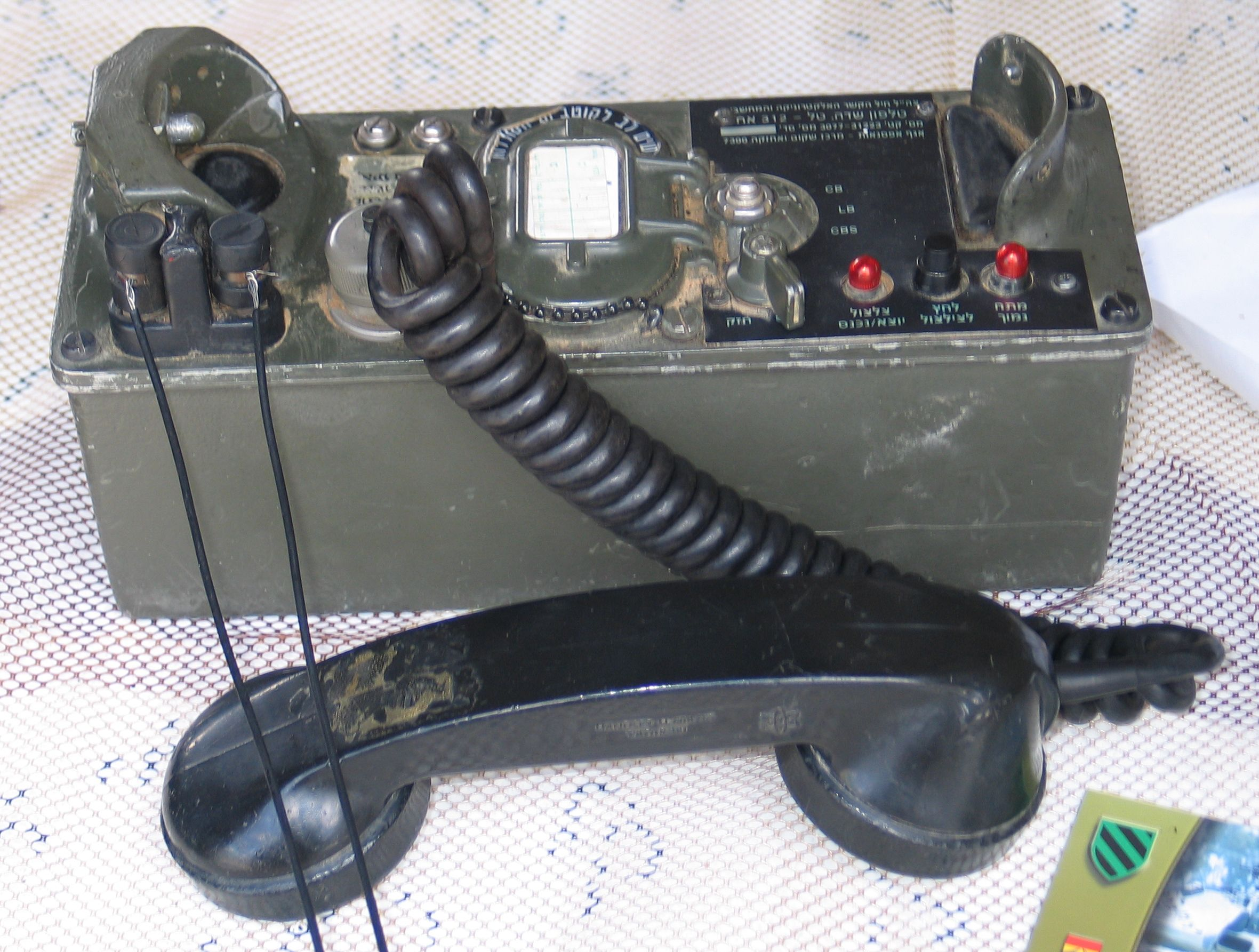
Modified TA-312 field telephone

Field telephones are telephones used for military communications. They can draw power from their own battery, from a telephone exchange (via a central battery known as CB), or from an external power source. Some need no battery, being sound-powered telephones.

== History ==
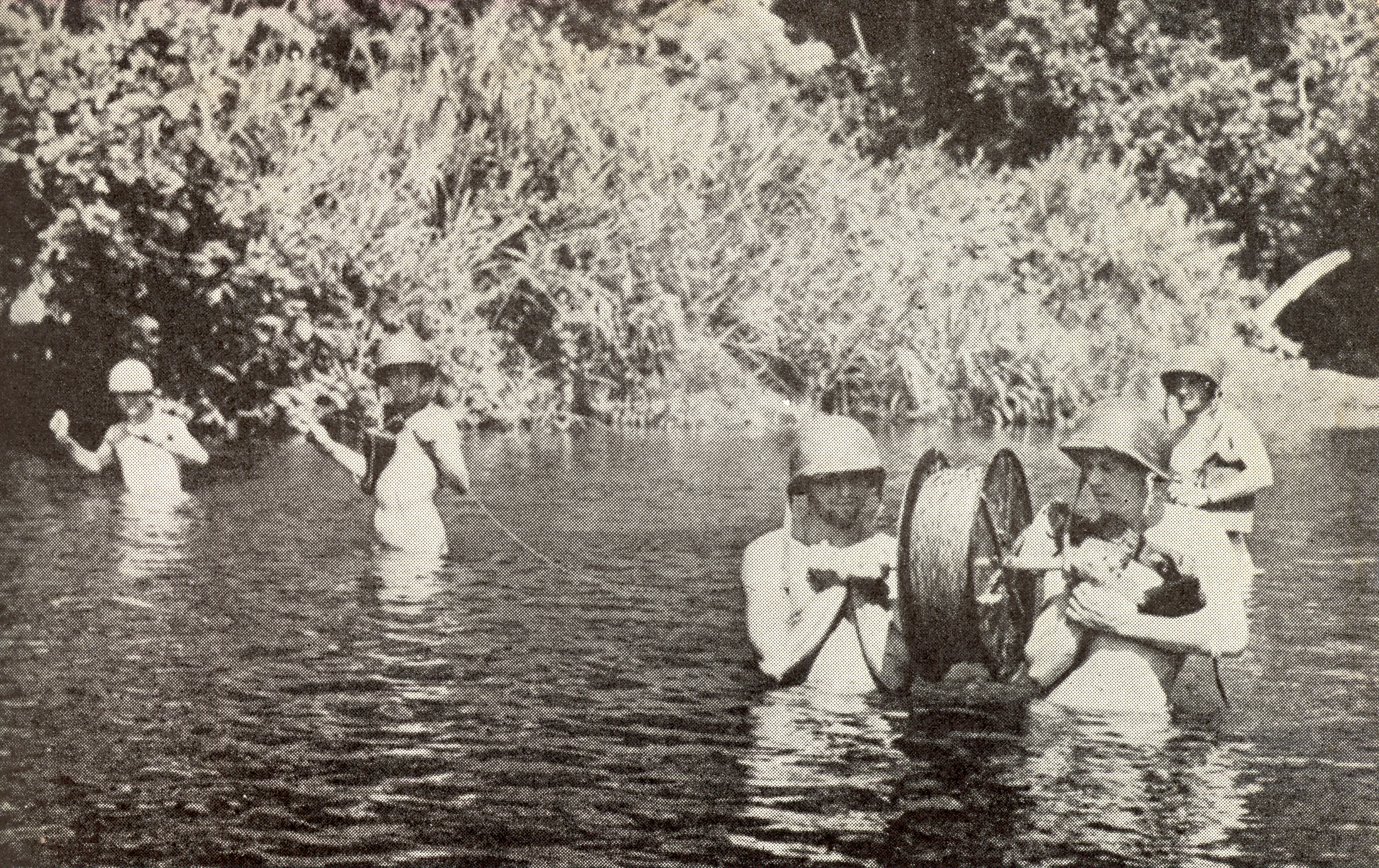
Telephone linesmen ford Lunga River during the Guadalcanal Campaign of World War II

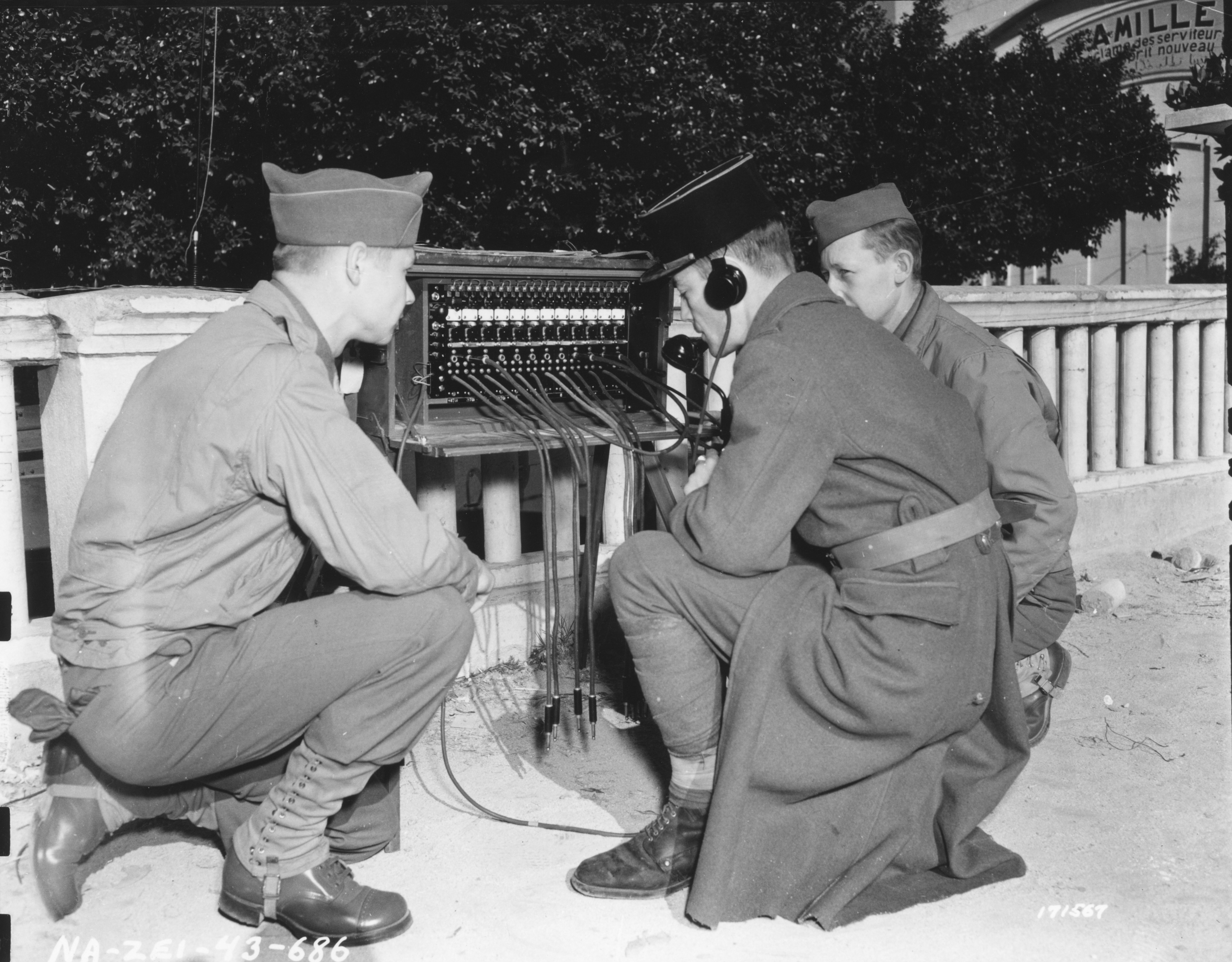
Field switchboard, 1943

Field telephones replaced flag signals and the telegraph as an efficient means of communication. The first field telephones had a battery to power the voice transmission, a hand-cranked ringing generator to signal another field telephone or a manual telephone exchange, and an electromagnetic ringer which sounded when current from a remote generator arrived. This technology was used from the 1910s to the 1980s. Later the ring signal was operated by a pushbutton or automatically as on domestic telephones. Manual systems are still widely used, and are often compatible with the older equipment.

Shortly after the invention of the telephone, attempts were made to adapt the technology for military use. Telephones were already being used to support military campaigns in British India and in British colonies in Africa in the late 1870s and early 1880s. In the United States telephone lines connected fortresses with each other and with army headquarters. They were also used for fire control at fixed coastal defence installations. The first telephone for use in the field was developed in the United States in 1889 but it was too expensive for mass production.

Subsequent developments in several countries made the field telephone more practicable. The wire material was changed from iron to copper, devices for laying wire in the field were developed and systems with both battery-operated sets for command posts and hand generator sets for use in the field were developed. The first purposely designed field telephones were used by the British in the Second Boer War. They were used more extensively in the Russo-Japanese War, where all infantry regiments and artillery divisions on both sides were equipped with telephone sets. By the First World War the use of field telephones was widespread, and a start was made at intercepting them.

Field telephones operate over wire lines, sometimes commandeering civilian circuits when available, but often using wires strung in combat conditions. At least as of World War II, wire communications were the preferred method for the U.S. Army, with radio use only when needed, e.g. to communicate with mobile units, or until wires could be set up. Field phones could operate point to point or via a switchboard at a command post. A variety of wire types are used, ranging from light weight "assault wire", e.g. W-130 – 8.5 kg/km (30 lb/mi) – with a talking range about 8.0 km (5 mi), to heavier cable with multiple pairs. Equipment for laying the wire ranges from reels on backpacks to trucks equipped with plows to bury lines.

== War in Ukraine ==
A Ukrainian mortar team commander in the Ukraine War told the BBC that "it's impossible to listen in ... This technology is very old – but it works really well."

== Torture of POWs ==
It has been documented in human rights reports as an instrument of electric torture with euphemisms utilizing the TA-57 telephone as a "phone call to Putin" or "call to Lenin".

In 2024, a leaked photograph showed one of the suspects accused of the 2024 Crocus City Hall attack being tortured by Russian FSB interrogators by having his genitals shocked by a TA-57.

According to the United States Army's Vietnam War Crimes Working Group Files, field telephones were sometimes used in Vietnam to torture POWs with electric shocks during interrogations.

== United States Army ==
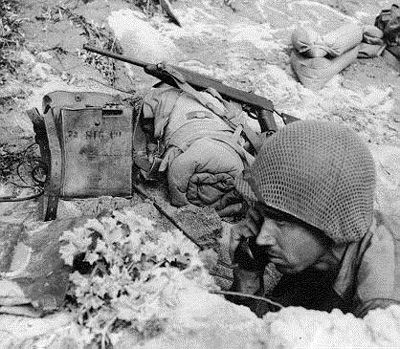
Soldier uses an EE-8 field telephone

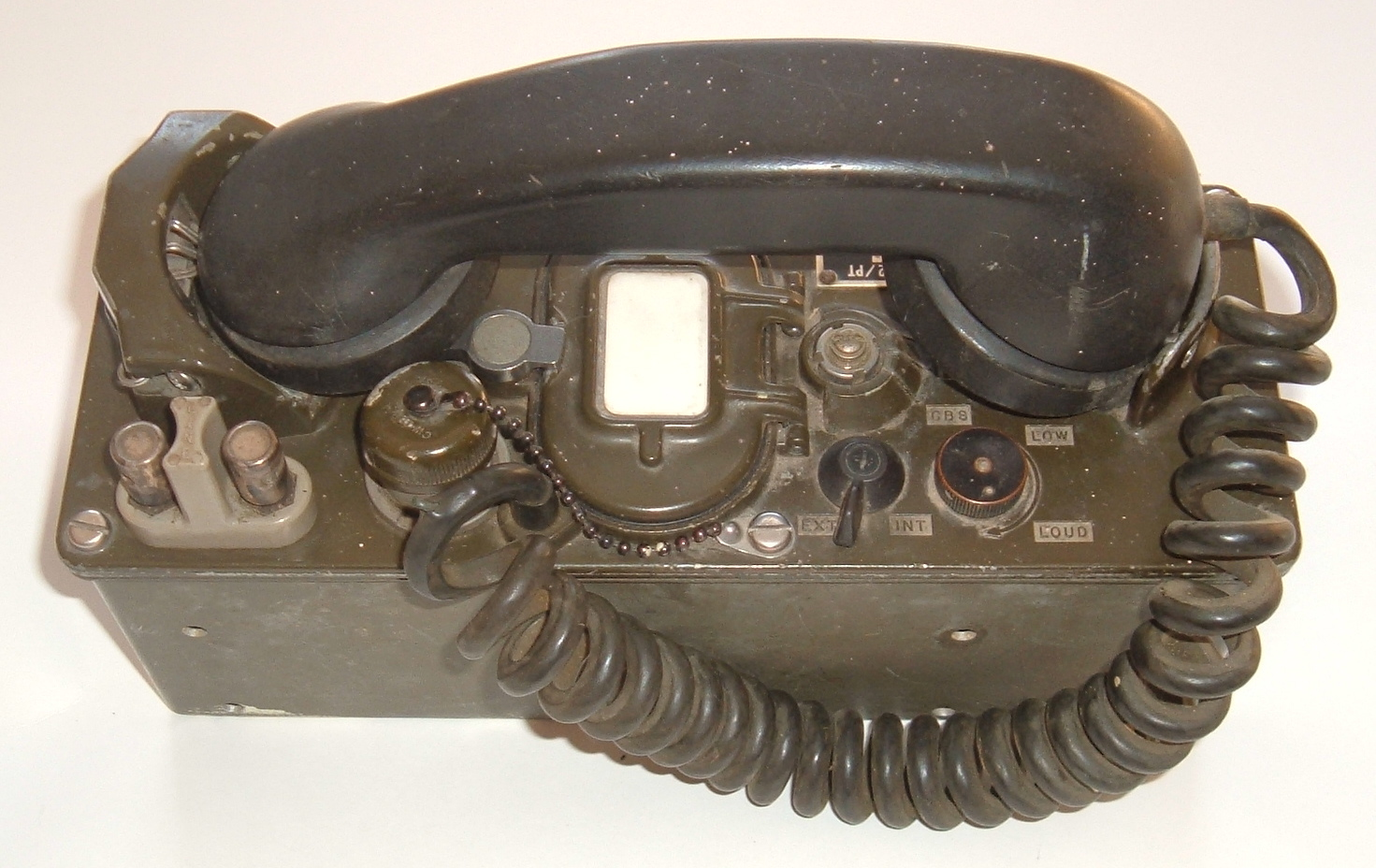
TA-312 field telephone

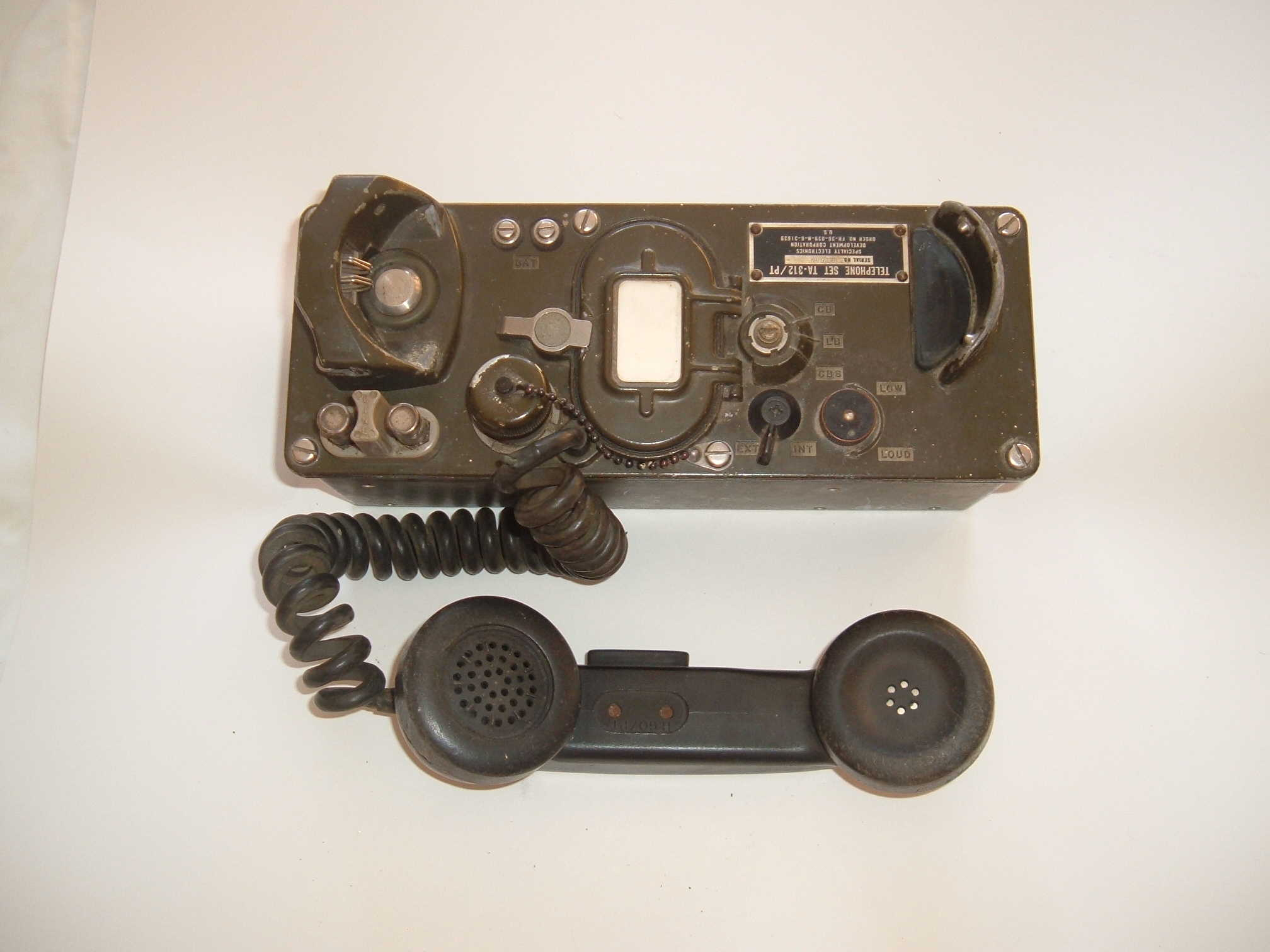
TA-312 with handset off hook

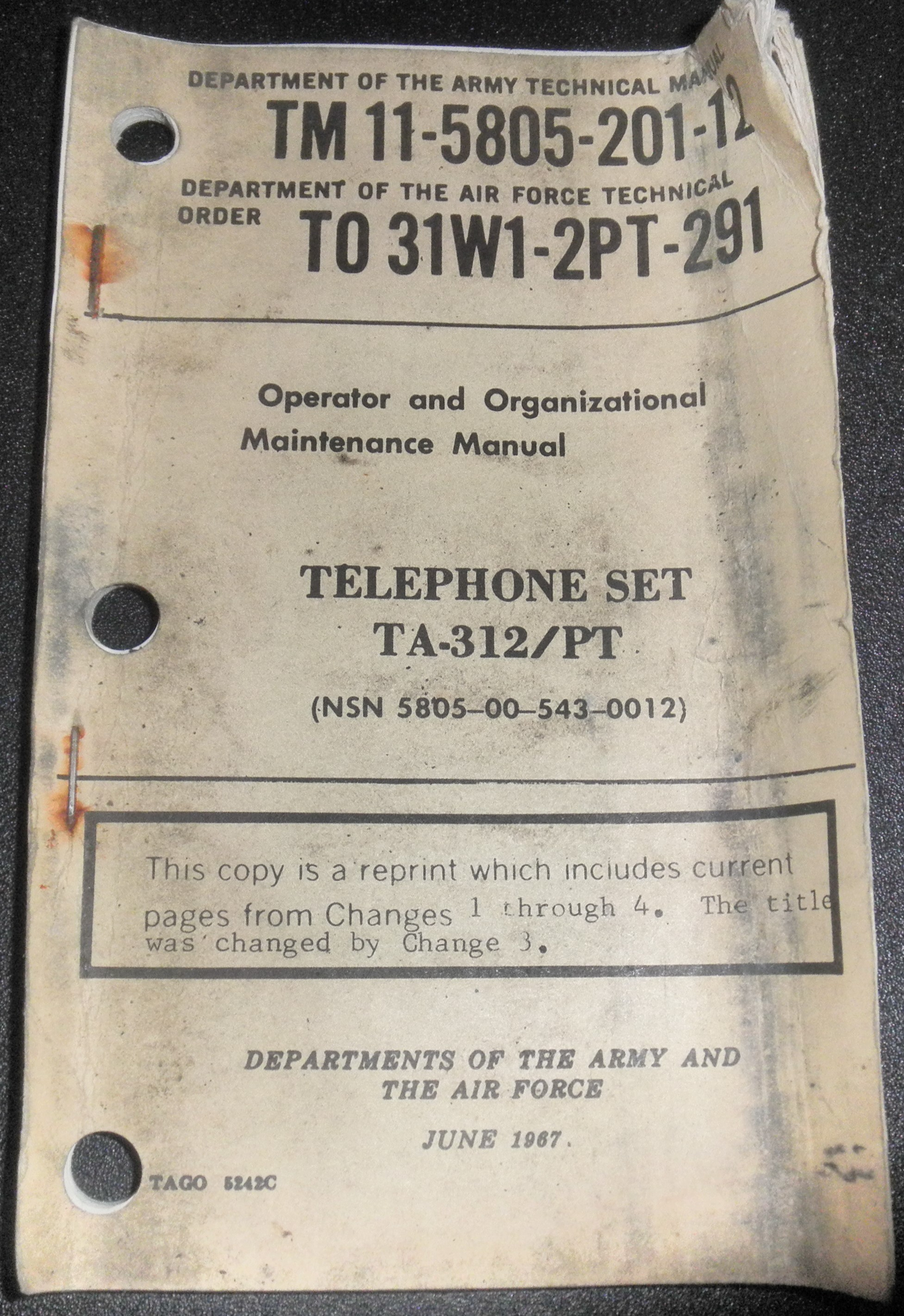
Telephone Set TA-312 Manual

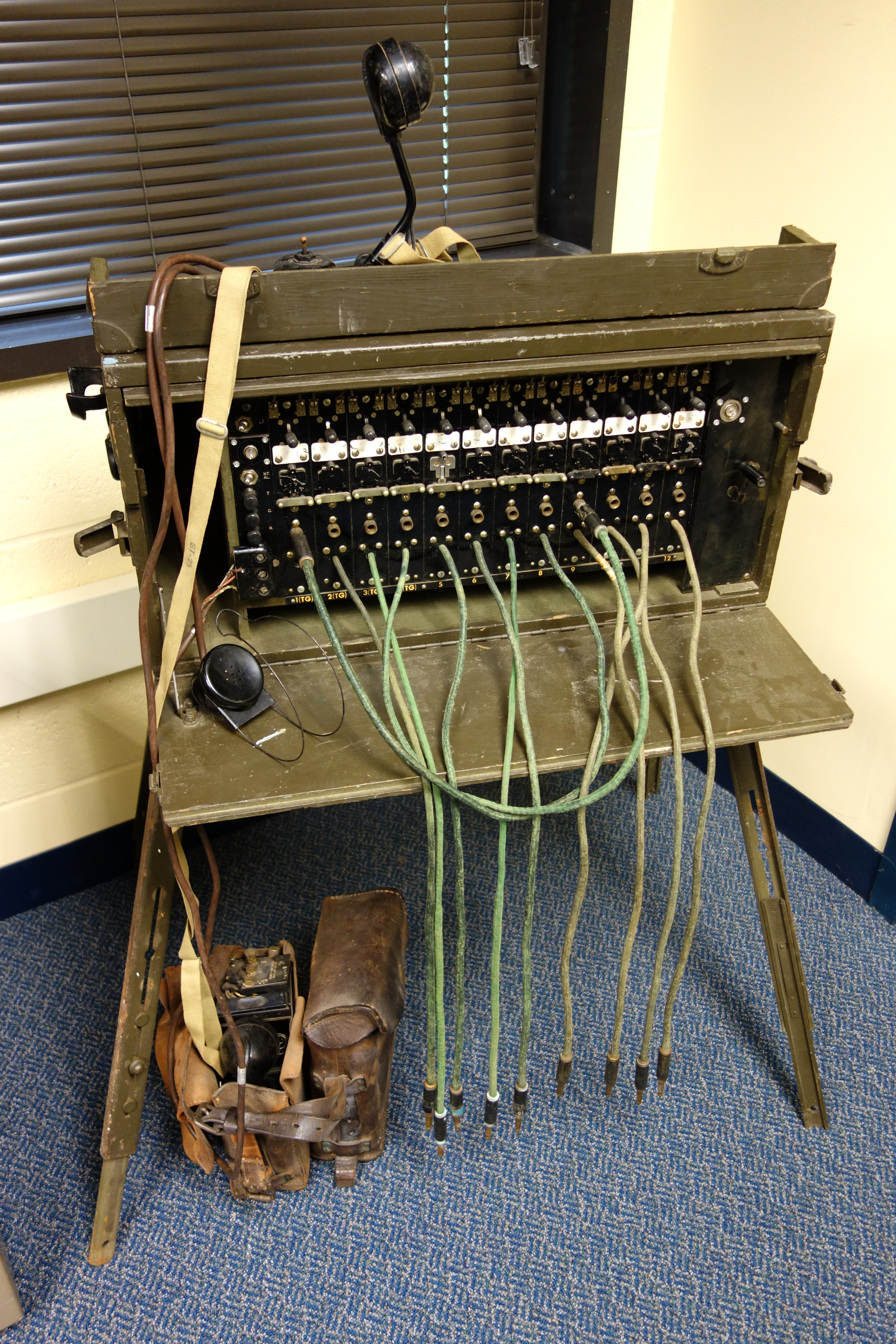
Field telephone switchboard on display at the Fort Devens Museum
- EE-8, World War II era through Vietnam War
- TA-1 4 mile range self powered no batteries
- TA-43
- TA-312
- TA-838, includes touch-tone key pad.

== Soviet Armed Forces ==
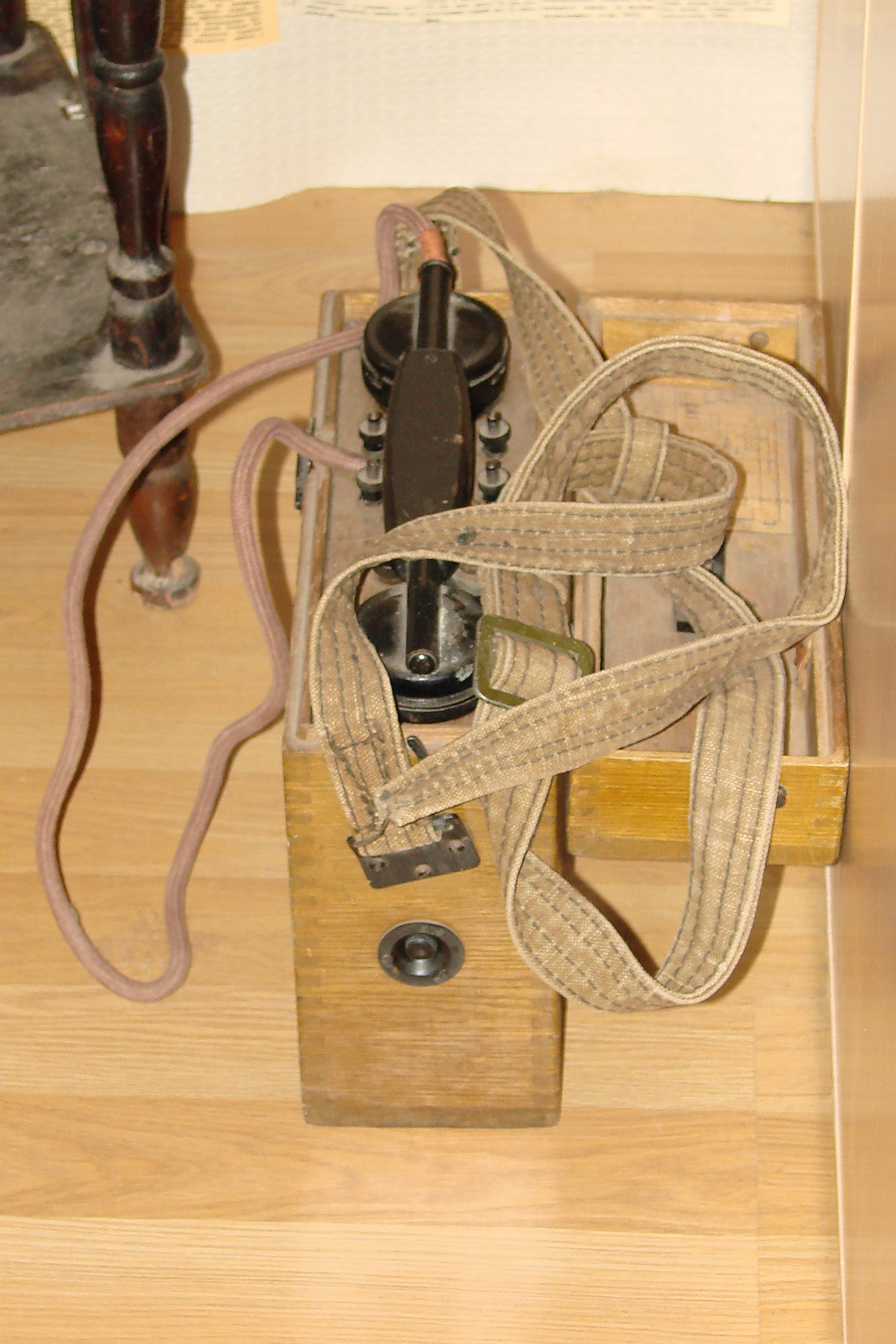
Russian УНА field telephone

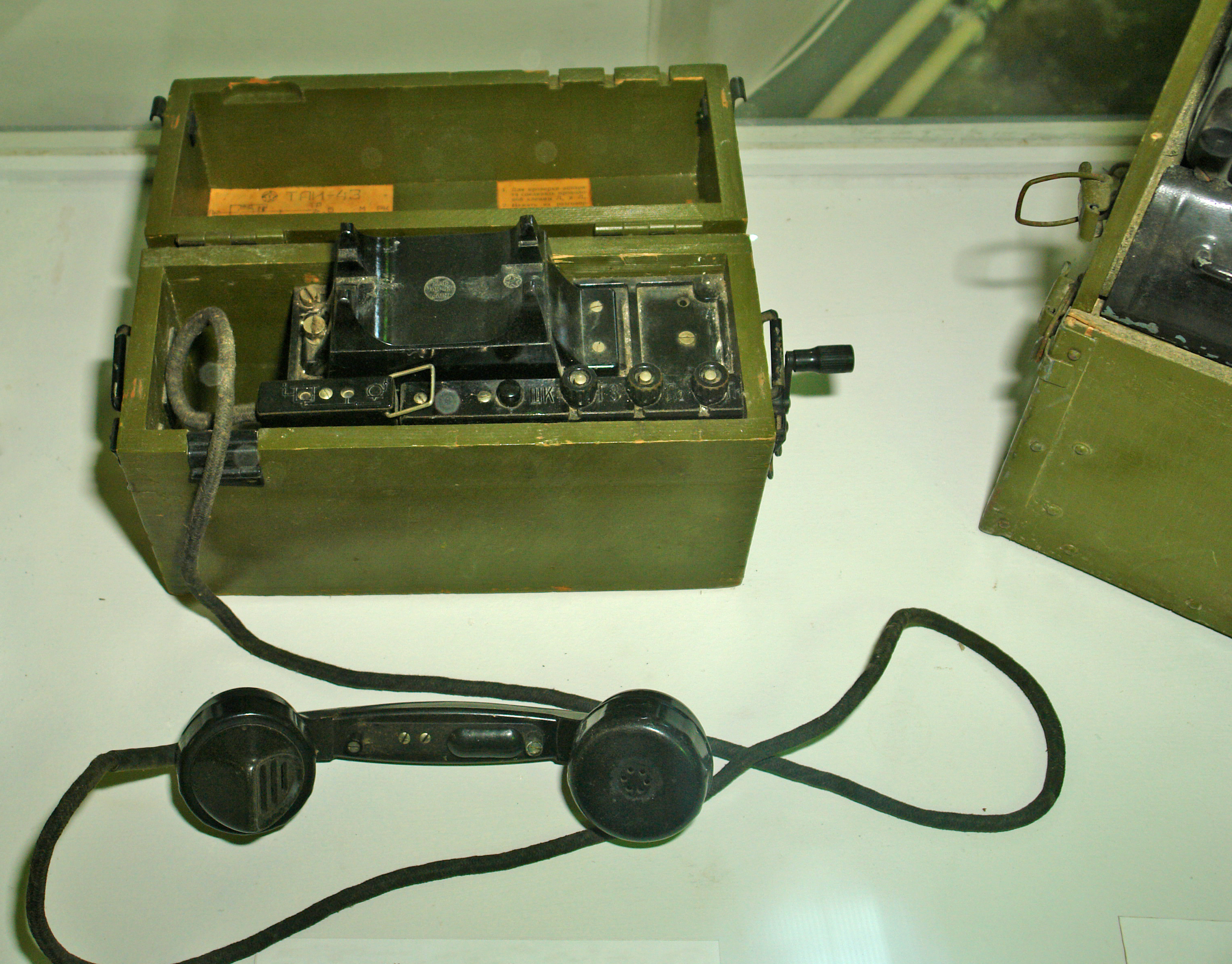
Russian ТАИ-43 field telephone

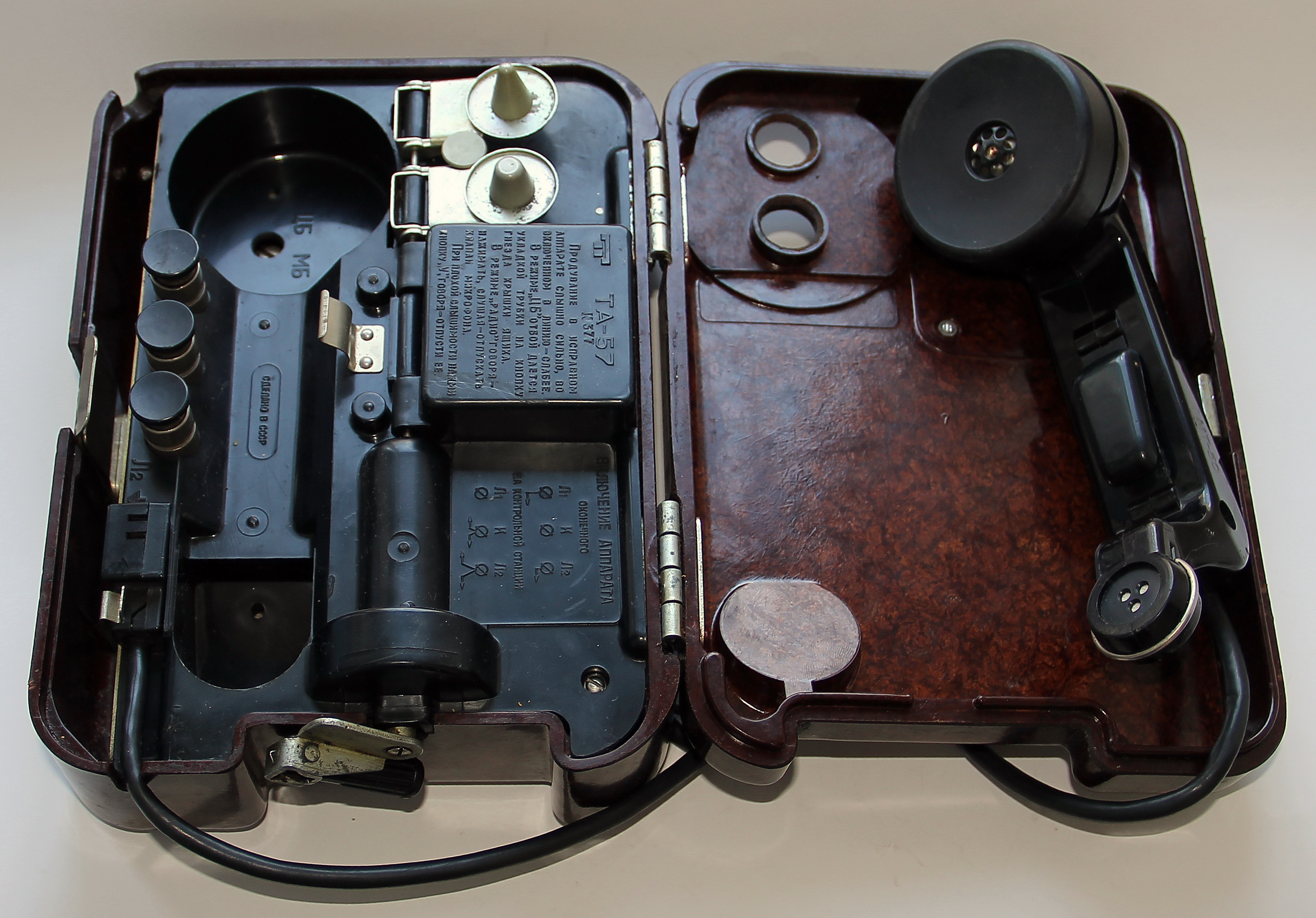
Russian TA-57 field telephone
- УНА "Unified unit" (Унифицированный аппарат)
- ТАИ-43 field telephone set (Полевой Телефонный Аппарат)
- ТА-57 field telephone set (Полевой Телефонный Аппарат)

== Royal Norwegian Defence Forces ==
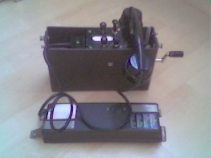
L.M. Ericsson M37 field telephone
- TP-6N Developed in Norway for the armed forces early 1970s.
- TP-6NA Versions of TP-6N A to C
- M37 Swedish field telephone used by the Norwegian Civil Defence. This phone is fully interoperable with the EE-8, TA-1, TA-43 and TA-312 series of US Field Phones.
- EE-8 A part of The Marshall Plan (from its enactment, officially the European Recovery Program, ERP) The EE-8* was used in USA from World War II to late seventies, and in Norway from World War II until the TP-6 could replace it.
- FF33 This phone was widely used from mid 1950s until it was replaced by TP-6 (after the EE-8) FF33 was left by the Germans when World War II ended, but was not used immediately due to political reasons.
- Mod 1932 Developed by Elektrisk Bureau for the Norwegian forces, approved in 1932 (as the 1st std. field telephone), but never made in great numbers, due to bureaucracy and the start of World War II. Based on a model made for the Turkish Army by Elektrisk Burau.

== Finnish Defence Forces ==
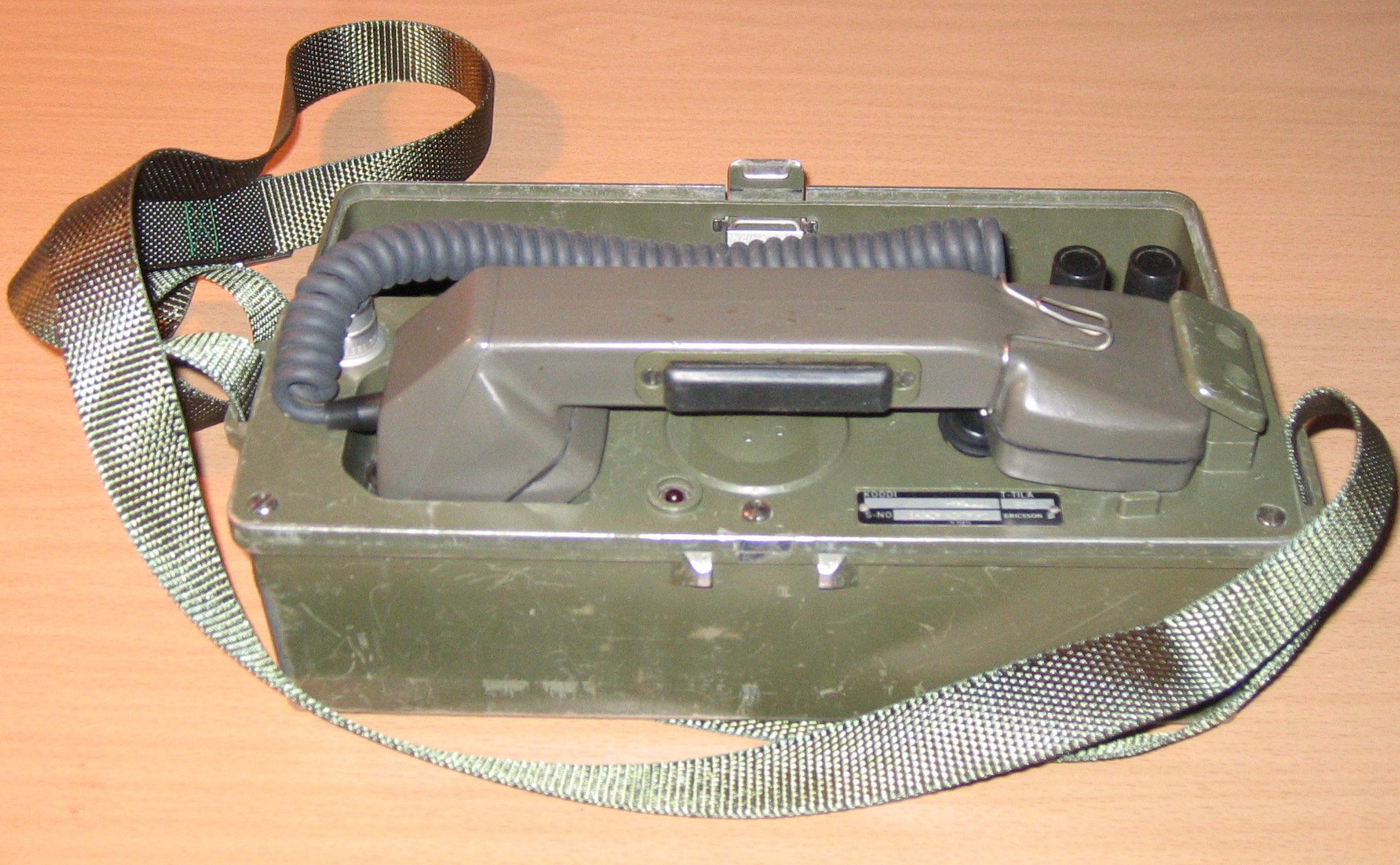
P 78 field telephone

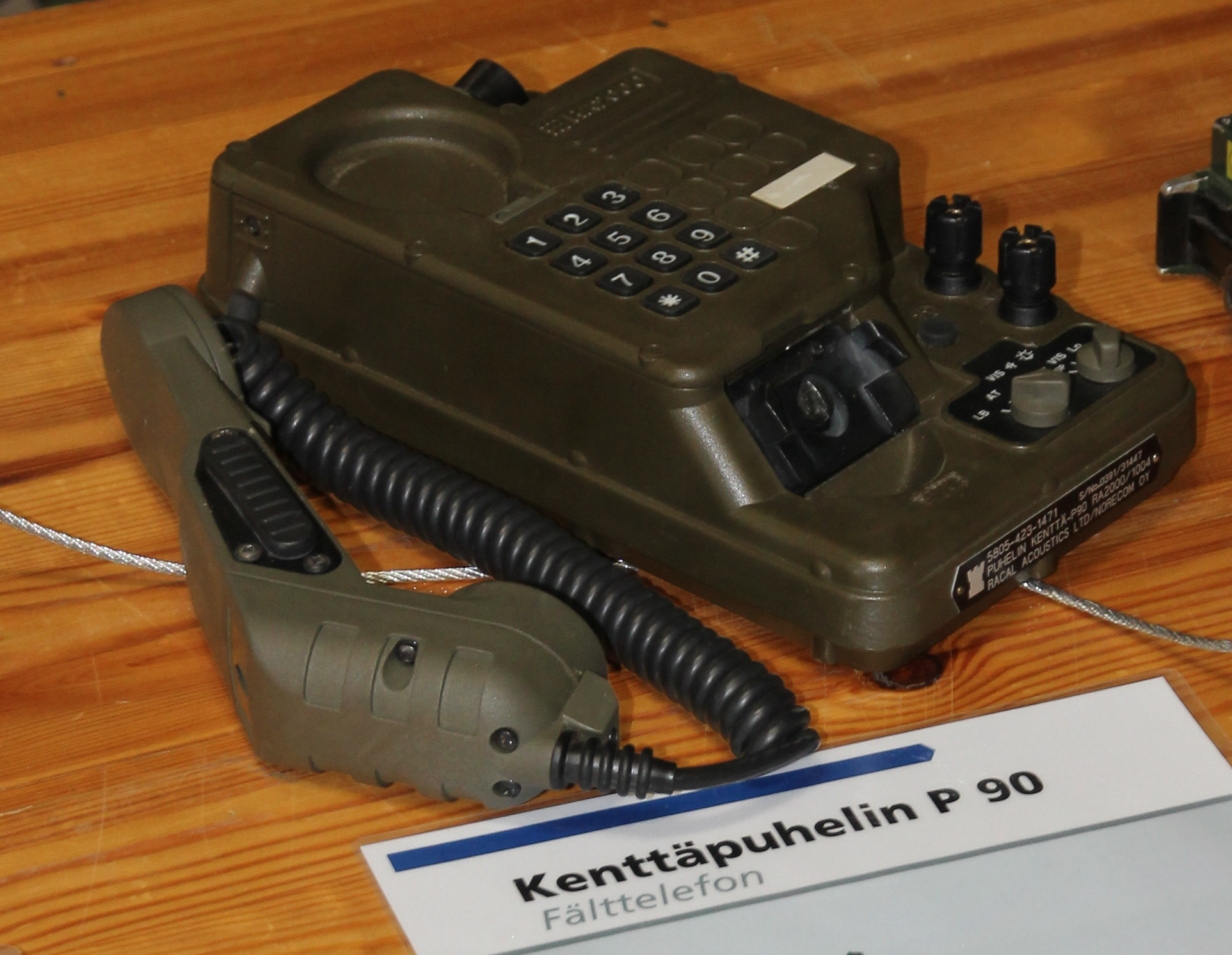
P 90 field telephone
- TA-57, made in the Soviet Union
- P78, made in Sweden by L.M. Ericsson
- P90, made in the UK by Racal Acoustics Ltd.
- ET-10, made by Terma A/S

== German Armed Forces (Wehrmacht) ==
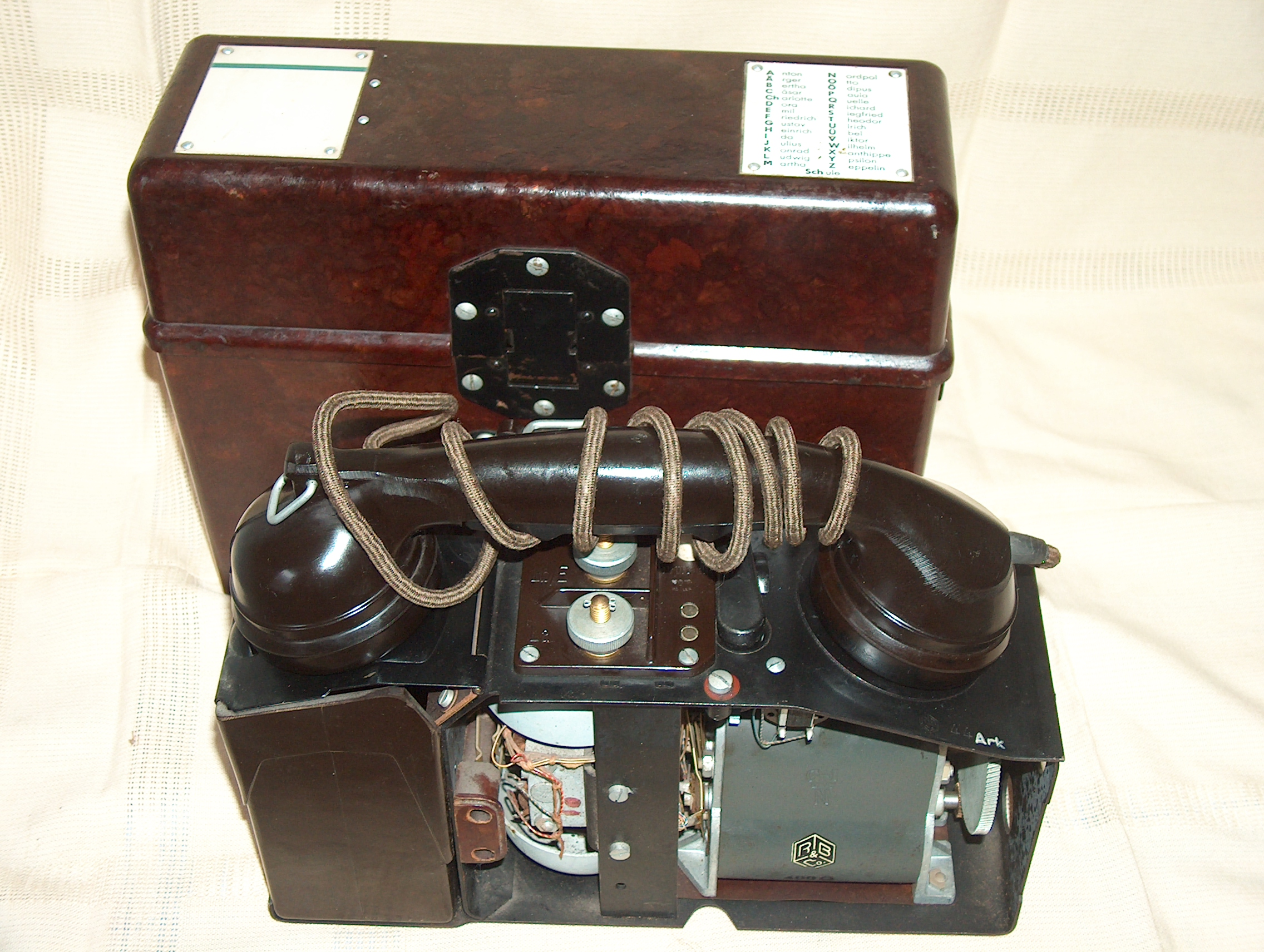
FF33 (Feldfernsprecher 1933)

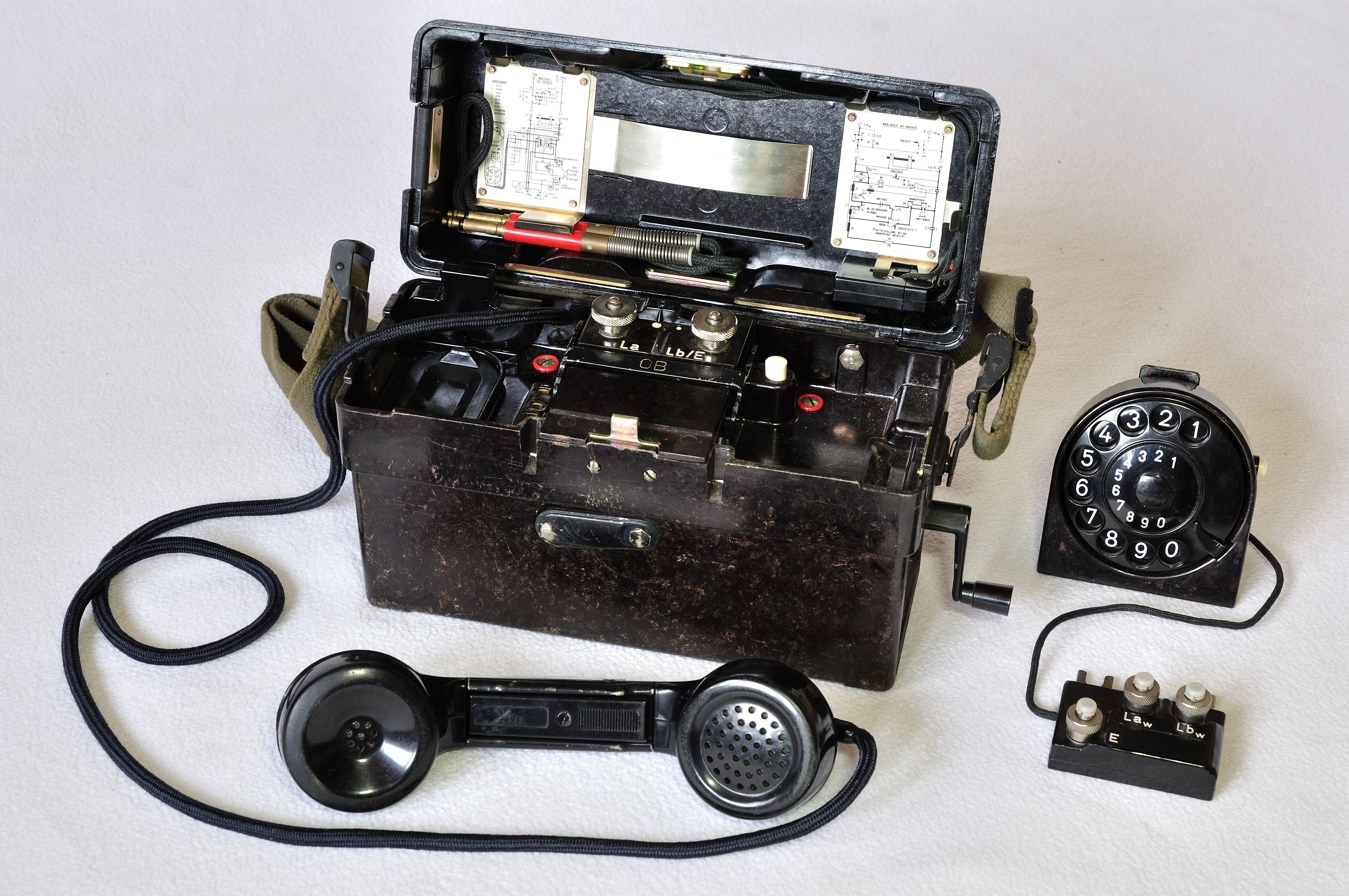
FF OB/ZB
- FF33 (Wehrmacht)
- FF OB/ZB (Bundeswehr, Feldfernsprecher Ortsbetrieb / Zentralbetrieb)

== Austrian Armed Forces (Bundesheer) ==
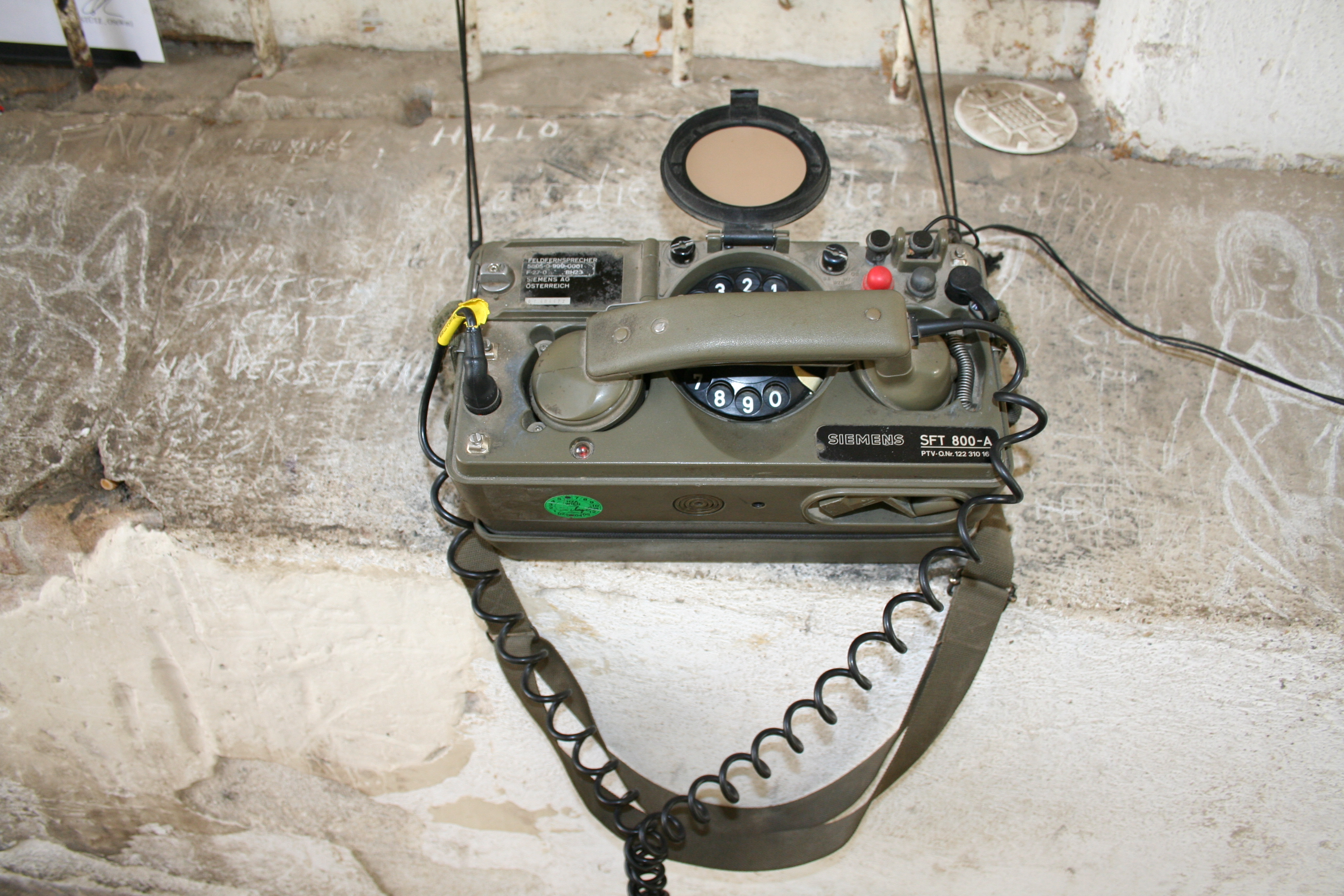
SFT800
- SFT800, made by Siemens AG

== Japanese Army (Imperial) ==
- Imperial Japanese Army Type 92 Field Telephone (大日本帝国陸軍 九二式電話機 Kyūni-shiki)
