= Adat People's Movement =

Political movement in Chechnya

Adat People's Movement Народное движение «Адат» «Ӏадат» халкъан болам
- Abbreviation: ӀADAT
- Leader: Ibragim Yangulbaev
- Founder: Ibragim Yangulbaev
- Founded: April 2020
- Banned: 11 July 2022
- Ideology: Chechen nationalism Anti-Kadyrov; Separatism; Islamism
- Political position: Right wing to Far right
- Colours: Black; White; Red

Party flag

Website
- 1adat.com (defunct)

The Adat People's Movement (Russian: Народное движение «Адат», romanized: Narodnoye dvizheniye «Adat»; Chechen: «Ӏадат» халкъан болам, romanized: «Jadat» xalq̇an bolam) is a clandestine Chechen opposition movement founded in 2020 and led by Ibragim Yangulbaev.

The movement gained fame thanks to the Telegram channel, the authors of which criticize the head of the Chechen Republic, Ramzan Kadyrov. Adat claims to be in favour of "an end to the genocide of the Chechen people, the unification of the Chechen people and the de-occupation of Chechnya."

The materials of their Telegram channel were termed by the Russian court as extremist and the entire movement is designated as an extremist entity in Russia.

== History ==
The movement was founded in April 2020 initially as a Telegram channel. Its leader is Ibragim Yangulbaev (born in 1995) of the Yangulbaev family. His father Saidi Yangulbaev is a well-known former judge in the republic who left the country in early 2022 after the arrest of his wife Zarema Musayeva.

On 31 January 2022, the Grozny Court put Ibragim Yangulbaev on the wanted list. On 12 May 2022, the telegram channel "1ADAT", associated with the movement, was recognized as extremist by the Supreme Court of the Chechen Republic. Earlier, at the suit of the prosecutor's office, publications in the telegram channel of the movement were recognized as extremist. On 11 July 2022, the movement was included in the list of banned organizations by the Russian Ministry of Justice. Soon the movement was added to the Federal List of Extremist Organizations at number 92.

Threats against the Yangulbaev family were made by the head of Chechnya, Ramzan Kadyrov. He called the family "accomplices of terrorists" and called on them to detain, and in case of resistance – to "assassinate".

In August 2022, it was reported that Salman Tepsurkayev, moderator of the movement's telegram channel, was killed by Kadyrov's security services.

After the announcement of the mobilization in Russia, the movement stated that its human rights activists had already received many complaints about the abductions of men in Chechnya and threats to send them to Ukraine.

The Russian propaganda company Internet Research Agency called the Adat movement a project of the West, the main goal of which is to discredit Chechnya and Russia.
