= Mikheyev v. Russia =

2006 European Court of Human Rights case

Mikheyev v. Russia was a 2006 court case involving Alexey Mikheyev and the Russian Federation. The case became notable as "the first serious victory in a case of torture" brought to the European Court of Human Rights against the Russian government. The case was brought forward by the Russian NGO Committee Against Torture and submitted to the European Court of Human Rights on November 16, 2001.

The applicant alleged that while in detention on remand he had been tortured by police officers in order to extract a confession to the rape and murder of a female minor. As a result, he had jumped out of the window of the police station and broken his spine. He also complained that the investigation into these events by the Russian police had been ineffective.

The court's decision in this case was a judgment on January 26, 2006. The ECHR recognized that there was ill-treatment of Mikheyev, which is a violation of Article 3 of the European Convention on Human Rights and Basic Freedom. In addition, the court held that there was a violation of Article 3 of the convention on account of the lack of effective remedies in respect of the ill-treatment that Mikheyev complained about. ECHR held that the State should pay Mikheyev 250,000 euros in total compensation.

== Case ==
Mikheyev (himself a traffic police officer) was falsely accused of murder (his alleged victim later turned out to be alive and well) and tortured in police custody in order to extract a confession to the alleged crime. The abuse included administering electric shocks to Mikheyev's earlobes - the torture method called "a phone call to Putin" by the torturers (Russian: звонок Путину). After surviving the torture, Mikheyev jumped out of a third-floor window to escape his tormentors; the fall resulted in a spinal cord injury that rendered him a paraplegic.

== Circumstances of the case ==
On the evening of September 8, 1998, 22-year-old traffic inspector Alexey Mikheyev of Nizhny Novgorod and his friend Ilya Frolov met in Bogorodsk with two girls: M. Savelyeva and Y. Krylova.

They spent some time together riding in Mikheyev's car, after which Krylova was taken home per her request and Savelyeva went to Nizhny Novgorod with Mikheyev and Frolov.

When they were in Nizhny Novgorod, the girl asked to take her back to Bogorodsk. Mikheyev refused, since it was already late and he felt tired. Mikheyev invited the girl to spend the night at his apartment, informing her that his parents were there and she had nothing to fear. The girl refused and got out at the bus stop, saying that she would go to her acquaintances'.

On September 10, 1998, the mother of M. Savelyeva submitted to the Bogorodsk City Department of Internal Affairs an application on disappearance of her minor daughter, who left home on September 8, 1998, and did not return. The same day, on suspicion of participation in the disappearance of Savelyeva, Mikheyev and Frolov were delivered to the Bogorodsk City Department of Internal Affairs, and after interrogation by investigator Naumov, they were placed in a cell. Formally, Mikheyev and Frolov have not been charged.

On September 11, 1998, employees of the Bogorodsk City Department of Internal Affairs Dunaev, Naumov and Tyulchenko illegally searched Mikheyev's apartment and car, and garages and summer cottages belonging to Mikheyev's grandfather. The search was carried out illegally without the presence of witnesses, and the inspection of garages and cottages was not documented, and search of apartment and car in protocol is indicated as "crime scene inspections" to give the searches an appearance of legality. During the vehicle search, police officers allegedly seized 3 pistol cartridges. Witnesses were not present during the car inspection and were invited to sign the protocol document after the pistol cartridges were discovered. Employees of the Bogorodsk City Department of Internal Affairs considered it necessary to continue to detain Mikheyev and Frolov. There were no legal grounds for further detention, therefore, police department employees: Dunaev, Naumov and Tyulchenko falsified police reports on pending hooliganism by Mikheyev and Frolov. On September 12, based on falsified reports, Judge of the Bogorodsky District Court imposed administrative arrest on A. Mikheyev and I. Frolov for 5 days until September 11, 1998.

From September 11 to 16, police officers intensely questioned Mikheev and Frolov for 10–12 hours at a time, forcing them to confess to rape and murder of Maria Savelyva and forcing them to write an admission of guilt.

On September 16, Frolov was released, and a criminal case was opened against Mikheyev for storing ammunition. The reason for initiating this case was the protocol of an illegal search of Mikheyev's car. Frolov was brought to this case as a witness. On September 16, Frolov was summoned for interrogation to the Leninsky police department, where after interrogation he was again illegally detained. After beating and threats from the deputy chief of the Nizhny Novgorod Region Department of the Internal Affairs, Pyotr Sibirev and the deputy prosecutor of the Nizhny Novgorod region, Vladimir Muravyov, he was forced to incriminate himself and admit that, together with Mikheyev, raped and killed Savelyeva. After recognition, Frolov indicated a fictitious place where he and his friend buried a corpse.

On September 17–19, A. Mikheyev was exposed to intensive interrogations. Although he was detained for storing ammunition, the police interrogated him about the case of M. Savelyeva's disappearance.

On September 19, after the confession of Frolov and the unsuccessful search for a corpse, Mikheyev was subjected to torture using electric shock. Under the influence of torture and threats, Aleksey Mikheyev confessed to rape and murder of Savelyeva, after which he was offered to confess to several more unsolved murders, which he also agreed to. After receiving a confession, the police officers stopped torturing Mikheyev. Probably in a stunned state after being tortured, Mikheyev leapt from his chair and jumped out of the office window, breaking the glass with his head. Having fallen on a police motorcycle in the courtyard of the police department, Mikheyev got a severe compression fracture of spine (L-I) with a crush of spinal cord and other injuries.

On the same day - September 19, 1998 - Maria Savelyeva returned home by herself.

== Public inquiry ==
In July 1999, Aleksey Mikheyev applied to the Nizhny Novgorod Society for Human Rights for help in restoring his rights. The material was moved to Committee Against Torture, marked by the registration number "01". Thus, Mikheyev's case became the first case to the Committee Against Torture after the registration of the Regional Public Organization "Committee Against Torture". In this case, the human rights defenders from Nizhny Novgorod uncovered a large set of illegal police activities, and in the future the case got a name as 'public inquiry into torture'.

The public investigation was accompanied by the detection of many fabricated administrative and criminal cases regarding Mikheyev. The main avenues for investigation were criminal case No. 68241 (when Mikheyev fell from the window of building of the Lenin Regional Department of Internal Affairs) and criminal case No. 310503 (compiling false reports by the Bogorodsky employees of the City Department of Internal Affairs in regard to Mikheyev).

Human rights defenders interviewed Mikheyev and Frolov, their relatives and friends, the patients of the hospital where Mikheyev was on treatment and reviewed the medical records of his stay. Witnesses of Mikheyev's vehicle search claimed that cartridges were removed from the car when they were absent. Moreover, Maria S. said that she had no complaints regarding Alexei Mikheyev.

After receiving evidence of the torture, illegal search, and other significant violations of human rights to regard to Mikheyev, work on the case was conducted by human rights defenders in several ways at the same time. At first, the efforts of the Nizhny Novgorod Society for Human Rights and the Committee Against Torture were focused on identifying and prosecuting the persons who tortured Mikheyev in the Lenin Regional Department of Internal Affairs in Nizhny Novgorod. Secondly, human rights activists sought to prosecute police officers who fabricated administrative material in relation to Mikheyev in Bogorodsk. Also, having irrefutable evidence of Mikheyev's innocence, the Committee Against Torture also joined forces in defending Mikheev from prosecution. To represent interests and protect Mikheyev, Yuri Sidorov was provided as a lawyer. In addition, Igor Kalyapin became a representative of the interests of the victim.

== Litigation in Russia ==
On September 21, 1998, Mikheyev's mother, Lyudmila Nikolaevna Mikheyeva, filed an application with the prosecutor's office of the Leninsky district requiring prosecution against the police officers who tortured her son. Criminal case No. 68241 was instituted on the signs of crime in accordance with Art. 110 of the Criminal Code (Incitement to Suicide) because of Mikheyev's falling out of the window.

In addition, Lyudmila Mikheyeva filed a complaint with the prosecutor of Bogorodsk complaining about the exceeding of official powers by the employees of the District Department of the Internal Affairs during his administrative arrest and search of his apartment and car. After a year and a half, in March 2000, a criminal case was opened in accordance with Art. 292 of the Criminal Code (Official Forgery).

In total, Mikheyev's investigation took 7 years, during which it ceased more than twenty times and was illegally held at least three times. According to the Committee Against Torture, the Russian officials set a sort of an "anti-record" in regards to the inefficiency of the investigation. In the opinion of the human rights defenders, this exhausting nature of the investigation was set up to force Mikheyev to give up on fighting against injustice.

In the case of Incitement to Suicide on November 30, 2005, the court sentenced Igor Somov and Nikolai Kosterin to four years in prison with deprivation of the right to take positions in a law enforcement agency for up to three years. Convicts were arrested in the courtroom. In 2009, the court sentenced the former police officers convicted in the case of Mikheyev to pay 8.5 million rubles (about 280,000 dollars in 2008) to the Russian Federation, the amount that the government paid Mikheyev at demanding of the European Court of Human Rights.

== Making a complaint to the European court of human rights ==
The prosecutor's office of Nizhny Novgorod several times refused to investigate the case. On November 16, 2001, employees of Committee Against Torture, Yuri Sidorov and Olga Shepeleva, representatives of Alexei Mikheyev, filed a complaint with the European Court of Human Rights regarding a violation by the Russian Federation of Articles 3, 5, 8 and 13 of the European Convention on Human Rights with regard to their representative. On 1 December 2001, the complaint was registered by the Court. In parallel, there were unsuccessful attempts to achieve effective interaction with the prosecutor's office of Nizhny Novgorod.

On February 26, 2003, a representative of Mikheyev submitted a request to the European Court of Human Rights to consider the complaint as priority, as Mikheyev's health was steadily worsening. Attached to the application: copy of statement from the history of Mikheyev's illness, the doctor's opinion, statement of his income, the living wage in the Nizhny Novgorod region. The notice that Mikheyev's complaint will be considered by the European Court of Human Rights as soon as possible was sent to the prosecutor of the Nizhny Novgorod region. On December 17, 2003, the commissioner of the Russian Federation at the European Court of Human Rights Pavel Laptev sent to the court the government's response memorandum. The memorandum expressed the opinion of the Russian authorities that the Court's consideration was premature as the criminal case of Mikheyev is still under investigation.

=== Position of the respondent government and decision of the European Court of Human Rights ===
The European Court of Human Rights trialed the claim in the case of Mikheyev v. Russia substantially. On January 26, 2006, the Court established that the ill-treatment in this situation achieved "torture level" per Article 3 of the convention. Also, the court determined a violation of Article 13 of the convention, because "the plaintiff was denied a fairly effective investigation and access to other remedies at his disposal including the right to compensation". As a rule, to apply to the ECHR, the plaintiff should pass all the judiciary echelons (e.g. from district court to supreme court). The Russian authorities objected in legal proceedings due to fact that plaintiff's side did not comply with this requirement, but the court dismissed this, stating that "The verdict of November 30, 2005 referred to only fact of ill-treatment and did not consider supposed faults in investigation".

=== Effects ===
By the decision of the European Court of Human Rights, Mikheyev was awarded a money compensation of 250,000 euros. However, journalists state that this money did not help him get back on his feet or change his residential conditions as all the money went towards paying the medical bills for Alexey's many illnesses.

=== Reaction of international organizations ===
According to Amnesty International and Human Rights Watch, torture with electric shock is common in Russia.

The Human Rights Watch wrote in a report on Russia in 1999:

The torture of Aleksei Mikheev was a particularly egregious example of Russian police methods.

The Amnesty International said:

Welcoming the conviction of the two police officers, Amnesty International calls for full redress for Aleksei Mikheev, including for all those responsible for his torture to be brought to justice in accordance with international standards.

The ACAT (Action des chrétiens pour l'abolition de la torture) organization from France reference the Mikheyev case in a report about torture in Russia, and said:

In the Russian Federation, the torture phenomenon is today commonplace and deeply rooted in the State institutions.

== Public response ==
The public response to the case in early years was not prominent, because access to information for the general public was provided mainly by television and print media as opposed to the Internet.

As a response to the case, in 1999 the Committee Against Torture published an article online outlining the steps to fighting the use of torture in the police.

The peak of public interest in the case was in 2005–2006. In November 2005, the officers Somov and Kosterin were sentenced to real of imprisonment, and in January 2006, the ECHR awarded Mikheyev compensation in the case of Mikheyev v. Russia in amount of EUR 250,000 (total). During these years, Mikheyev's case was highlighted by print media, online publications and television.

In 2004, Alexey Mikheyev was on rehabilitation in Norway. His treatment was paid by a Norwegian fund for retired policemen and a Norwegian journalist who shot a story about Alexey for a local TV channel.
