= Crew Against Torture =

Russian non-governmental organisation

- Команда против пыток
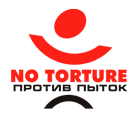
- Formation: 2000; 26 years ago
- Type: Non-profit; NGO
- Headquarters: Nizhny Novgorod with representations in Orenburg Oblast, North Caucasus, Krasnodar region and Moscow
- Location: Russia
- Fields: Investigation of torture allegations, medical and legal support for torture victims, representation of victims in court
- Key people: Igor Kalyapin, Sergey Babinets
- Website: pytkam.net
- Formerly called: Committee Against Torture (Continued in reduced capacity as Committee for the Prevention of Torture)

The Crew Against Torture (NGO CAT; Russian: Кома́нда прóтив пы́ток, romanized: Komanda protiv pytok, founded as Committee Against Torture, Комитет против пыток, the name was changed in June 2022) is a Russian non-governmental organisation in the field of human rights based in Nizhny Novgorod, Russia. CAT provides assistance to victims of torture and conducts independent investigation of torture cases. In addition, CAT publishes reports on systemic problems regarding the ineffectiveness of official investigations and prosecution of torture in Russia.

CAT addresses human rights violations relying mostly upon legal mechanisms available at the national level. In case the national mechanisms have proven ineffective, CAT helps victims to apply to the international human rights bodies (mainly, to the European Court of Human Rights) and represents them in proceedings.

CAT promotes human rights protection in various regions of Russia. As of 2022, CAT operates in five regions: Nizhny Novgorod region, Orenburg region, the North Caucasus, Moscow and Krasnodar region. One of the most notable CAT's cases is the case of Aleksey Mikheyev, "the first significant victory against torture practices in Russian police".

CAT received numerous awards for its work. In 2018, Olga Sadovskaya, CAT's vice-chair and human rights activist, was nominated for the Nobel Peace Prize.

CAT received several presidential grants and funding from the European Commission of Human Rights.

In 2015, Russian Federation officially designated CAT as a foreign agent.

== History ==
In December 1997, the Nizhny Novgorod Society for Human Rights published a report "On the use of torture in Nizhny Novgorod region" to draw attention of the authorities to the systemic problem of unlawful ill-treatment and to urge them to take action to prevent such crimes. However, the report was dismissed.

In 2000, Igor Kalyapin, a member of the Nizhny Novgorod Society for Human Rights, and other human rights activists founded the "Committee Against Torture" as an independent organization.

In 2001, CAT succeeded for the first time in bringing a police officer to justice. The Nizhegorodsky District Court of Nizhny Novgorod found Alexei Ivanov, a CID operational officer, guilty of abuse of power. The court established that Ivanov used violence against a minor Maxim Podsvirov and forced him to defame his brother. Ivanov received a 6-year suspended sentence.

Human rights activists from Orenburg Oblast, Bashkortostan, the Republic of Mari El and the Chechen Republic started using the CAT's method of independent "public investigation". CAT opened its offices in those regions shortly thereafter.

In 2004, Ivan Chetvertakov, a head of the Bolsheboldinsky Police Department, was sentenced to 3 years of imprisonment for using violence against an individual. The case is notable for being the first CAT's case that ended in a police officer receiving a prison sentence.

On 26 January 2006, the European Court of Human Rights delivered its judgement in the case of Mikheyev v. Russia. It was the first CAT's case submitted to the ECHR as well as the first case when the Court acknowledged the responsibility of the Russian Federation for torture.

In 2007, CAT became an interregional public organization.

On 29 December 2014, CAT received a written warning from the prosecutor's office of Nizhny Novgorod region stating that CAT was participating in political activities. According to Igor Kalyapin, the prosecutor's office considered CAT as "influencing state policy" because it was telling the public and the authorities about torture in police and about "the Investigative Committee’s poor performance when addressing such cases". CAT's annual picket on the International Day in Support of Victims of Torture and its publications about the event were also considered as political activities.

In January 2015, the Ministry of Justice of the Russian Federation designated CAT as a foreign agent organisation following the warning from the prosecutor's office.

On 1 August 2015, CAT's team decided to close the Committee Against Torture down. The Committee for the Prevention of Torture was created as the CAT's successor.

On 14 January 2016, the Ministry of Justice of the Russian Federation designated the Committee for the Prevention of Torture and its associate the Bureau of Public Investigations as foreign agent organizations. According to the Ministry, The Committee "received donations from some Russian citizens who worked for organisations with foreign funding". The committee's appeal against the decision was rejected by the Leninsky District Court of Orenburg.

On 29 March 2017, the Federal Bailiffs Service arrested the committee's bank accounts. In November 2017, the committee announced its elimination as a legal entity.

Until 10 June 2022, the NGO operated without a legal entity under its original name “Committee Against Torture” in five regions of Russia: Nizhny Novgorod region, Orenburg region, the North Caucasus, Krasnodar region and Moscow. The office in Mari El region was closed in 2017. The Bashkortostan Republic office was closed in the spring of 2022. Igor Kalyapin mentioned the lack of people with suitable professional skills as the main reason for having offices in only seven regions.

=== The new Committee’s Head ===
In December 2021 the members of the CAT elected a new chairman. It was Sergei Sergeievich Babinets, who had led the committee's offices all over the country, specifically in Moscow, Nizhny Novgorod and Orenburg, for many years. He has also been a long-time member of a Joint Mobile Group of human rights activists in the Republic of Chechnya.

In February 2022 in an interview for The Insider Kalyapin stated that the reason behind his resignation were the disagreements between him and the team.

The CAT's press office explained that the resignation was a consequence of the democratic election held every three years within the committee. A chairman is elected in the framework of this protocol. According to the press secretary, the last time Sergei Sergeievich Babinets garnered the majority of votes.

=== Liquidation of the Committee and the launch of the Crew ===
On 10 June 2022, The Ministry of Justice of Russia included Committee Against Torture in the list of the unregistered public associations operating as foreign agencies. On June, 11 the members of the Committee decided to liquidate the organisation, but no later than June, 15 announced the continuation of work under the name of "Crew Against Torture".

The Head of CAT, Sergei Babinets, stated that the organisation could not agree with the Ministry of Justice's verdict, however not being able to proceed with their activities as a foreign agency. If remaining in the status of a foreign agent, the dialogue with the state government would become impossible. Sergei has named the liquidation of the committee and the creation of the Crew a necessary step that would allow for the continuation of work on the unresolved issues, with 188 of them being active at the moment of elimination.

"The label of a foreign agent has not really damaged us, we have preserved our team and will continue working twice as hard. This case has only shown us once again how silly the state is when it undertakes a witch hunt, especially in the wrong places. I suppose that the prosecution should be organized after those who torture people in penitentiaries or carry billions of funds away from the country, not after the social activists who try to defend the human dignity of Russians", — Sergei Babinets, the Head of the Crew Against Torture.

== Goals and methods ==
=== Objectives ===
The CAT's main goals are:

- to stop torture and ill-treatment;
- to ensure that the perpetrators of torture are brought to justice;
- to help victims to obtain justice and reparation.

=== Activities ===
==== Investigation of torture cases ====
After a victim applies to the Committee Against Torture, CAT carries out an independent “public investigation” into allegations of torture and ill-treatment[22].

The main idea of the "public investigation" is to improve the work of the investigative authorities when addressing cases of serious human rights violations. A public investigation also aims at making the state acknowledge such violations by establishing them through court proceedings, if there is sufficient evidence.

Public investigators are not state officials, thus they don't have special authority to collect evidence. Public investigators use powers provided by the national law to participate in the official investigation and contribute to fact-finding and gathering of evidence.

Main principles of the CAT's public investigation approach are:

- protection of the public interest;
- priority of the national legal mechanisms over the international ones;

Protection of the public interest. CAT defends the public interest while addressing human rights violations. It has no obligation to represent a victim if they decide to bargain with the prosecuted or their defence. If a victim decides to change their statement in favour of the defence after the sufficient evidence of torture had been collected, CAT also reserves the right to ensure the victim's prosecution for perjury.

Priority of the national legal mechanisms. CAT focuses primarily on restoring violated rights through national legal means. It urges national authorities to investigate human rights violations effectively and comply with laws and regulations. Applying to international human rights bodies is considered a measure of “last resort” that should be used only if all the domestic remedies have been exhausted.

CAT created a Joint Mobile Group (JMG) Program to investigate mass and regular violations. A JMG, consisting of members of various human rights organisations from all over the country, operates on-site for several months.

==== Support of victims ====
CAT helps victims of torture to obtain justice and reparation by representing them in proceedings before investigative authorities, domestic courts and international human rights bodies.

If necessary, CAT also helps victims to find necessary specialists, purchase medications and receive treatment in rehabilitation centres. For example, in 2006, CAT paid for a rehabilitation treatment of Vladimir Polyashov, an artist from Dzerzhinsk, who was beaten by police officers.

CAT helps to evacuate victims and their families in case of threats and pressure.

== Results ==
Since its foundation in 2000 up to March 2022, CAT received more than 3108 complaints of human rights violations and won 75 cases in the European Court of Human Rights. 281 occurrences of torture were confirmed. 2438 unlawful decisions of the national authorities were quashed. More than 285 million roubles were awarded as compensation to the victims of torture. More than 159 law enforcement officers were convicted.

=== Mikheyev v. Russia case ===
In September 1998, Aleksey Mikheyev was arrested on suspicion of committing rape and murder. While Mikheyev was detained at the police station, police officers tortured him and forced him to incriminate himself. Mikheyev jumped out the window and broke his spine.

The proceedings at the national level lasted seven years. The evidence was gathered by members of the Nizhny Novgorod Society for Human Rights, Igor Kalyapin and Maria Smorodina, and Sergey Shimovolos, the chairman of the Nizhny Novgorod Regional Commission on Human Rights. However, the investigation was suspended 3 times, and the case was closed and reopened more than 20 times.

On 26 January 2006, the European Court of Human Rights delivered its judgement in the case of Mikheyev v. Russia. The Court concluded that the ill-treatment of Mikheyev amounted to torture and that he "has been denied a sufficiently effective investigation in respect of the ill-treatment by the police and thereby access to any other available remedies at his disposal, including a claim for compensation".

The Mikheyev case was the first case where the ECHR found the Russian Federation responsible for torture.

Human rights activists note the exhausting effect of a lengthy official investigation and criminal cases against Mikheyev as factors that might had been aiming to force him to give up, as it eventually had happened to another victim, Ilya Frolov, who had retracted his statements and got a job in the Ministry of Internal Affairs.

=== Blagoveshchensk zachistka ===
The Blagoveshchensk mass beating ("The Blagoveshchensk zachistka") was a four-day operation of intimidation carried out by local police and OMON in Blagoveshchensk, Bashkortostan and its neighbourhoods from 10 December 2004 to 14 December 2004. During the operation, police officers of the Blagoveshchensk police department and the OMON officers entered private houses and public buildings and used physical violence to carry out mass arrests. Detainees were brought to the Blagoveshchensk police department where they were forced to remain still in an uncomfortable body position for several hours. The police officers beat those who tried to move.

According to official reports 341 people were abused. According to the NGO reports more than 1000 people were detained in total and about 200 people were beaten on the spot, but were not taken to the police department.

After the news became public, CAT formed a JMG to conduct a comprehensive public investigation. Human rights defenders managed to gather evidence of the crimes and helped to initiate an official investigation against perpetrators. The activists also provided assistance to victims in court proceedings.

Several Blagoveshchensk police department and OMON officers received suspended sentences of 3 to 5,5 years. Only Aidar Gilvanov was sentenced to 3 years of imprisonment in a colony[38]. Some of the perpetrators managed to avoid punishment.

== Protection of human rights in the North Caucasus ==
In 2009, human rights activists Natalia Estemirova, Zarema Sadulaeva and Alik Jabrailov were killed in Chechnya. The risks of working in the region have sharply increased for human rights organisations following the incident. The non-governmental organisation Memorial temporarily suspended the activities in Chechnya.

CAT's chairman Igor Kalyapin suggested creating a JMG (joint mobile group), that would consist of 3 activists from different CAT's regional offices and that would operate on a rotational basis, to investigate cases of forced disappearances, torture and extrajudicial executions. On 30 November 2009, the first group began to work in Grozny.

On 2 April 2010, Islam Umarpashayev was found and released after being tortured for three months at the base of the Chechen OMON. The case of Umarpashayev is one of many examples of CAT's JMG successful work in Chechnya.

The Group was criticised and pressured by the Chechen authorities, including the head of the Chechen Republic, Ramzan Kadyrov, who publicly accused the JMG team of "hating Chechen people". According to Kadyrov, activists "came here [to Chechnya] to earn money".

The relations between CAT and the Chechen authorities deteriorated further after the 2014 Grozny clashes when the jihadist organisation Caucasus Emirate attacked Grozny on 4 December 2014. According to official reports, 11 terrorists, 14 law enforcement officers and 2 civilians have died.

Kadyrov, who led the counterterrorist operation, said that "the families of the militants will be expelled from the Chechen Republic, and their houses will be demolished". His words marked the beginning of the arson attacks. CAT applied to the Investigative Committee and the Prosecutor General's Office demanding legal assessment of Kadyrov's statement and checking whether his statement violated the Russian Constitution. Igor Kalyapin made a public statement, emphasising that "only the court should decide whether the relatives of the militants are responsible and deserve punishment by establishing the mens rea element and the degree of their participation in the crime". Kadyrov accused CAT of supporting terrorism, and Kalyapin of having connections with the militants’ leaders. The Commissioner for Human Rights in the Chechen Republic, Nurdi Nukhazhiev, joined the pressure campaign towards CAT in social media and on television.

On 13 December 2014, a mass rally against terrorism was held in Grozny. A group of unknown armed people followed the JMG team after the end of the rally. Later that day the CAT's office in Grozny was set on fire.

On 3 June 2015, at 10 a.m. the CAT's office was attacked once again. A group of young men in surgical masks showed up at the picket that was held near the office by "public organisations and representatives of the civil society of Chechnya". The masked men broke into CAT's office and living quarters, vandalised the premises and damaged the CAT's car. The activists managed to flee.

The CAT's office was moved from Chechnya to Ingushetia following the incident. Nevertheless, the pressure on CAT's team operating in the North Caucasus continued.

On 16 March 2016, Igor Kalyapin was attacked in the city centre of Grozny.

On 6 October 2021, law enforcement officers came to the house of the parents of Magomed Alamov, the head of the CAT's regional office in the North Caucasus, and asked about his whereabouts.

In December 2021, Abubakar Yangulbayev, the CAT's lawyer, reported the abduction of his relatives in Chechnya (more than 40 people). On 20 January 2022, Zarema Musayeva, Yangulbayev's mother, was forcibly taken from Nizhny Novgorod to Grozny by Chechen security forces.

For some of the CAT's cases in the North Caucasus, see below.

=== The case of Gasangusenov brothers ===
On 23 August 2016, Gasangusenov brothers, 19-year-old Gasangusein and 17-year-old Nabi, who worked as shepherds, were shot dead during a special operation by law enforcement near Goor-Khindakh village, Shamilsky District, Dagestan.

=== The case of Iritov family ===
On 31 October 2017, police officers beat a local activist Aslan Iritov, his wife Marina, their daughter Anzhelika and Aslan's brother Beslan. Aslan Iritov was arrested and charged with assaulting and attempting to strangle a police officer, although Iritov was disabled and had no hands.

The investigative authorities refused to initiate proceedings against police officers four times. CAT appealed against all refusals. Three refusals were eventually quashed as unlawful.

On 8 December 2020, CAT submitted the case to the European Court of Human Rights. The activists argued that the Russian authorities violated the applicants’ right to freedom from torture, right to an effective investigation and right to the respect for private and family life.

=== The case of Albert Khamkhoyev ===
On 14 November 2017, a well-known Ingush athlete Albert Khamkhoyev was detained, beaten and tortured by police in Yandare village, Ingushetia.

On 22 January 2018, an official investigation was launched.

On 21 June 2021, CAT submitted the case to the European Court of Human Rights, accusing the Russian authorities of violating Khamkhoyev's right to freedom from torture and right to an effective investigation.

== CAT and the Russian authorities ==
CAT focuses mainly on working with the investigative authorities and the judiciary.

Working on allegations of torture presents severe difficulties due to the reluctance and, in some cases, the active resistance of the investigators. According to CAT's statistics, on average, they receive up to 6 refusals to initiate criminal proceedings per a case. The participation of human rights activists increases chances that an official investigation will be launched.

Russia doesn't collect statistics on torture cases, as there is no special article prohibiting torture in the Russian Criminal Code. The perpetrators are usually prosecuted under Article 302 "Coercion of witness" and Article 286 "Abuse of power". Those articles cover a wide range of crimes, which makes the task of distinguishing and tracking torture crimes impossible.

The former CAT's chairman Igor Kalyapin was responsible for contacts with the high level executive authorities. He is a member of the Presidential Council for the Development of Civil Society and Human Rights. Kalyapin suggested criminalizing torture as a separate offence, increasing number of human rights activists in public monitoring commissions and creating a special unit within the Investigative Committee for addressing torture cases.

== Partners and funding ==
Initially, CAT's work was financed by its founder, Igor Kalyapin. The lawyers that worked on Mikheyev's case were volunteers. Later, CAT received funding from the European Commission of Human Rights and the Open Society Foundations.

In 2013, CAT was awarded a presidential grant for the first time. It covered salary and wages, work of guest attorneys, expert research costs, transportation, and medical treatment of victims. CAT received presidential funding distributed by the Civic Chamber which comprised approximately 2% of CAT's budget.

In 2015, the Ministry of Justice of the Russian Federation designated CAT as a foreign agent. The Ministry considered as foreign funding the fact that CAT's employees received salary in the Bureau of Public Investigations and paid membership fee in CAT.

As of 2022, including the period after the title changing, CAT operates as an unregistered public organisation without a legal entity and without a bank account and doesn't receive any funding.

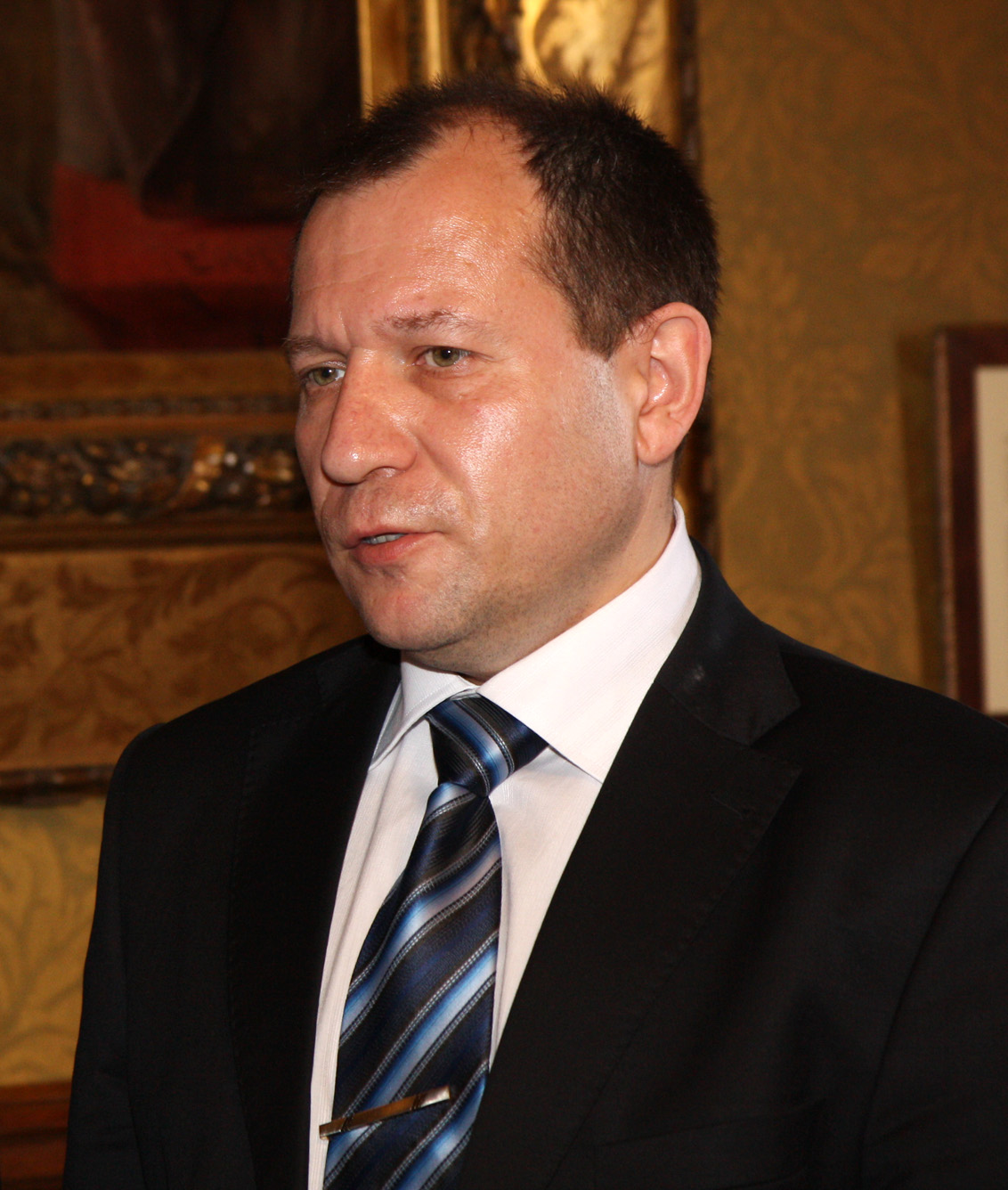
Igor Kalyapin in 2011

== Awards and recognition ==
The activity of Igor Kalyapin and of the Committee earned recognition from the international community. In 2011 the Human Rights Prize was awarded to the committee by the Parliamentary Assembly of the Council of Europe. During the ceremony Mevlüt Çavuşoğlu (the chairman of the PACE during the time) has underlined that this small NGO made a strong contribution in the human rights defence, especially in the Northern Caucasus due to the competence and bravery of its members. Same year Igor Kalyapin and the project of "Joint Mobile Groups" by the committee was awarded by Irish organisation Front Line Defenders. The same project received Martin Ennals Award. In 2018 Igor Kalyapin received Egor Gaidar Award in category "For actions on formation of Civil Society". Olga Sadovskaya, the vice-president of the committee, was nominated for a Nobel Peace Prize in 2018. In 2017 she and the journalist of Novaya Gazeta Elena Milashina were awarded Sakharov Prize by Norwegian Helsinki Committee. Agency of Social Information distinguishes the Committee among organisations pursuing the justice while remarking that torture by the police remains a severe problem in Russia. The director of the Europe and Central Asia programmes Tatiana Lokshina said: "Kalyapin and his group are practically the only ones who dare do human rights work in Chechnya despite vicious threats and brazen attacks".

== See also ==
- Agora (organisation)
