= TA-57 =

Soviet-era field telephone

TA-57 (Полевой Телефонный Аппарат)
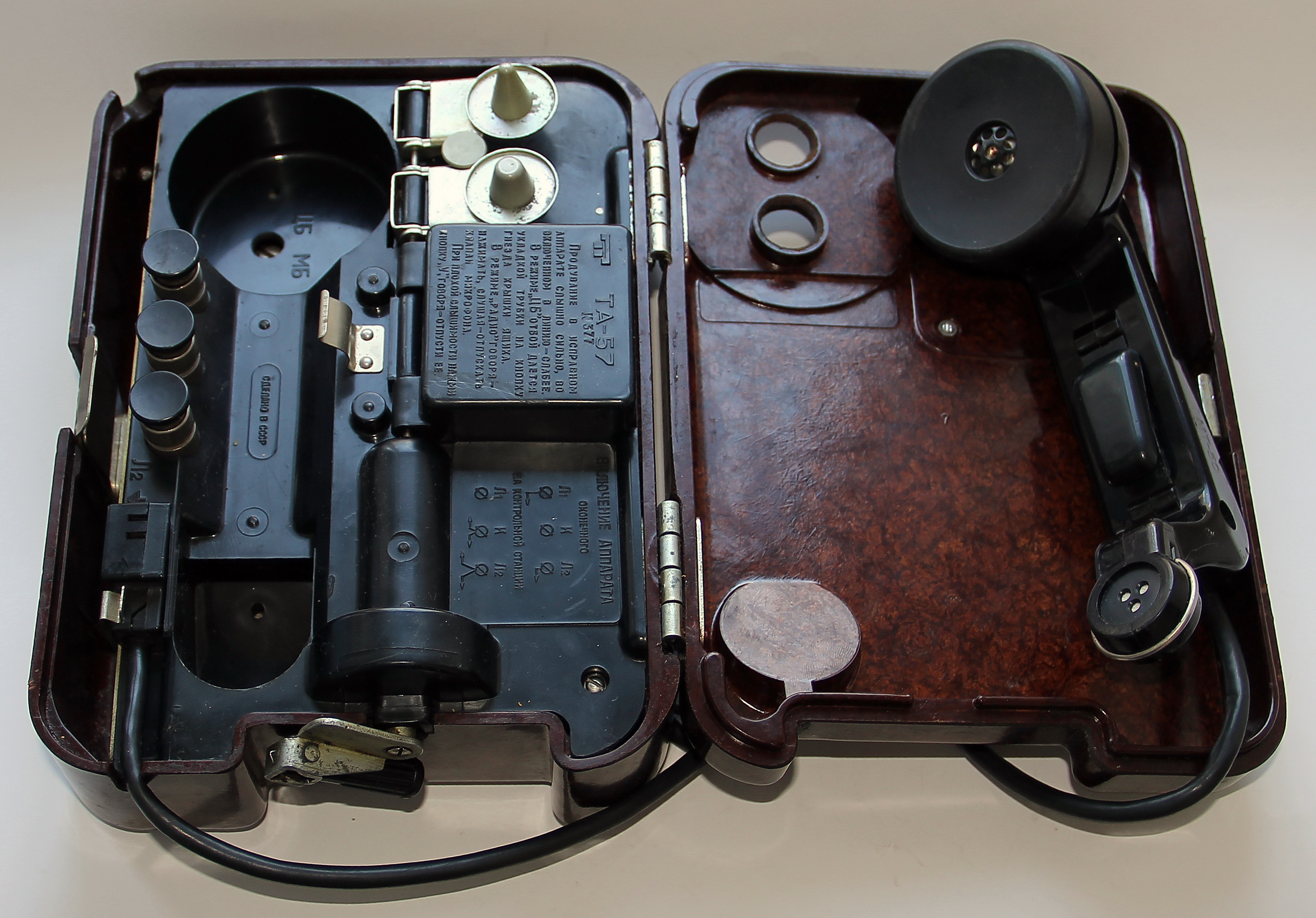
- TA-57
- Main technologies or sub-processes: Field telephone
- Year of invention: 1957

The TA-57 is a Soviet-era field telephone. It is a completely analog battery-powered wired system that is highly resistant to electronic interception and jamming.

== History ==
The first model of the TA-57 rolled out in 1957 for usage by the Soviet Armed Forces.

As of 2022, the TA-57 was reported to be in use by Russian forces in the Russo-Ukrainian War.

It has been documented in human rights reports as a torture device during the conflict, with euphemisms utilizing the TA-57 as a "phone call to Putin" or "call to Lenin". It was also used to torture a suspect of the Crocus City Hall attack.

== Description ==
The TA-57 can be used for induction calls working with 2-wire lines in an OB (local battery) or a ZB (central battery) operation. It can be used to transmit voice messaging in ranges between 0.3 and 3.4 kHz, with a calling frequency of 15 to 45 Hz. Absolute signal level at output of transmission path with a 600Ω load ranges between −3 and +3 dBu. It also a has a deployment time of 2 minutes.

Power is primarily drawn from a 10V lead–acid battery GB-U-1.3 (ГБ-10-У-1.3) with a capacity of 1.3 Ah, alternatively a 9V block battery can be utilized. In OB battery operation, a hand cranked magneto can be used to generate ringing.

The enclosing and body is made of Bakelite and its dimensions measure 22.2 x 16.5 x 7.9 cm, and weighs 2.8 kg.

There are multiple cables that are used, which can establish the range of the phone:

- Field cable P-275 (П-275); 20 km range
- Field cable P-274 (П-274); 40 km range
- Field cable P-268 (П-268); 40–45 km range
- Field cable P-271 (П-271); 125 km range
- Overhead line; up to 170 km range.

With a reception amplifier, the signal range of the phone can increase by 30-50%.

It is intended for operation ranging from -40 °C to 50 °C, and a max humidity of 98% at 25 °C.

A modernized variant of it is known as a TA-57U.

== Users ==
- Ukraine
- Russia

=== Former users ===
- Soviet Union
- Iraq – one specimen in the Imperial War Museum was acquired during Operation Granby.
