= Phone call to Putin =

Russian police euphemism for torture

The phone call to Putin (Russian: звонок Путину, romanized: zvonok Putinu) is a slang term used by some Russian police departments for a torture method which consists of administering electric shocks to the person's earlobes, nose, and/or genitals. According to Amnesty International, torture with electric shocks by security forces and prison, jail, and penal colony guards is common in Russia. An example of a device used for this purpose is a TA-57 telephone.

This method was profiled in publications describing the case of Aleksei Mikheyev who was falsely accused in 2006 of murder while his alleged victim was alive and well. After surviving the alleged "phone call" torture, he jumped out of a third-floor window to escape his tormentors. The fall resulted in a spinal cord injury that rendered Mikheyev a paraplegic. His case was taken to the European Court of Human Rights in Strasbourg, France and became notable as "the first serious victory in a case of torture" brought to the Court against the Russian government.

Since Russia launched a full-scale invasion of Ukraine on 24 February 2022 there have been many reports of torture by Russian forces with the use of electric shocks. A woman from Kherson reported that Russian soldiers tortured her with electric shocks and called the torture "a phone call to Zelenskyy".

== See also ==
- Tucker Telephone
