= Elena Milashina =

Russian journalist

- Елена Милашина
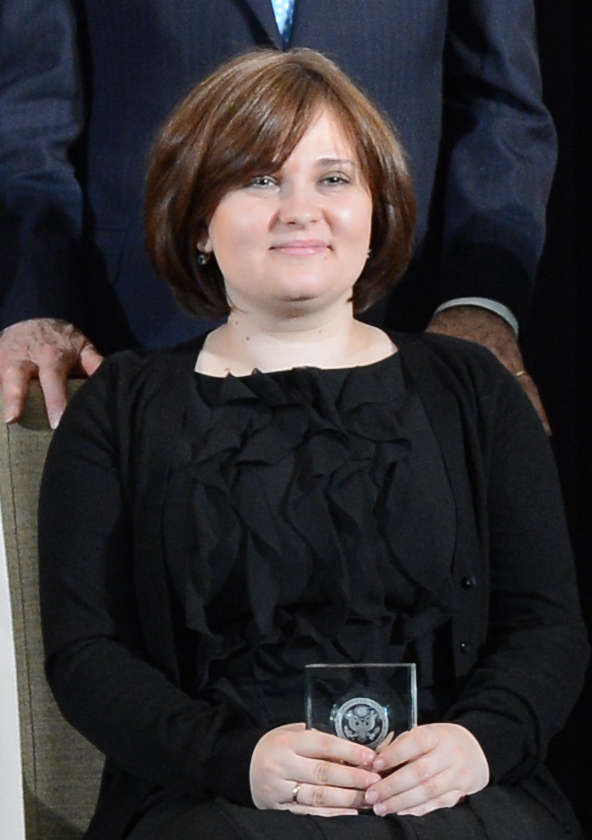
- Milashina in 2013
- Born: 1977 (age 48–49)
- Occupations: Journalist, human rights defender, writer, investigative journalist
- Awards: International Women of Courage Award (2013); Golden Pen of Russia (2001); Free Media Awards (2016); Redkollegia (2017); honorary doctorate of the Vrije Universiteit Brussel (2019); Journalism as a Profession (2017)

Elena Valeryevna Milashina (Russian: Елена Валерьевна Милашина, romanized: Yelena Valeryevna Milashina; born 1977) is a Russian investigative journalist for Novaya Gazeta. She has received multiple awards for her work.

Milashina has been threatened and attacked over her work multiple times over the course of more than a decade. In 2023, she was severely beaten while covering a trial in Chechnya.

== Early life and education ==
Elena Milashina was born in 1977. In 1994–95, she took part in the FLEX exchange program; this helped her to further enter the Moscow State University.

== Career ==
In 1997, Milashina began working as a reporter and journalist for Novaya Gazeta, while studying at the same time. One of her mentors was Anna Politkovskaya. In 2001 she graduated from the Faculty of Journalism of Moscow State University.

The areas of professional interest of Milashina include corruption, human rights violations in the North Caucasus and Chechnya, in particular, the investigation of the 2004 Beslan school siege, the 2006 assassination of Anna Politkovskaya, the 2008 conflict in South Ossetia, and the 2009 abduction and murder of Natalya Estemirova. She has also reported on anti-gay purges in Chechnya.

She continued investigations started by her colleague Anna Politkovskaya, who was assassinated in Moscow in 2006, and her own independent investigations into occurrences in the North Caucasus.

== Attacks and threats ==
In the early morning of April 5, 2012, Milashina, along with her friend Ella Asoyan, was attacked by two unknown assailants in the Balashikha neighborhood of Moscow.

While visiting Grozny, Chechnya on February 6, 2020, to attend a trial, Milashina and human rights lawyer Marina Dubrovina were attacked and beaten by unknown female assailants at the lobby of the Kontinental hotel.

Novaya Gazeta reported on February 8, 2022 that Milashina had been forced to leave Russia due to threats against her.

In July 2023, Milashina and Alexander Nemov, the lawyer for Zarema Musayeva, whose trial Milashina was covering, were hospitalised after reportedly being attacked by an armed group in Chechnya. The assailants also shaved Milashina's head and covered it in green dye, known as a Zelyonka attack, while telling her to leave and to not write any articles, according to the Memorial human rights organization. Milashina and Nemov were taken by plane to Moscow, where Milashina was hospitalized with a traumatic brain injury, numerous fractures of the hands and bruises.

== Awards and honors ==
- 2001 Golden Pen of Russia in the Investigative Journalism category for a series of materials about the Russian submarine Kursk (K-141)
- Human Rights Watch's Alison Des Forges Award for Extraordinary Activism (2009)
- Knight-Wallace Fellowship for Journalists (2009-2010)
- International Women of Courage Award (2013)
- Free Media Awards (2016)
