= Hero of the Chechen Republic =

Honorary title Hero of the Chechen Republic
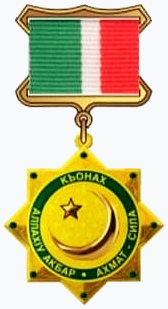
- Obverse of the Hero of the Chechen Republic
- Native name: Герой Чеченской Республики
- Type: Honorary title
- Presented by: the Chechen Republic
- Eligibility: Russian citizens and foreign nationals
- Status: Active
- Established: 31 October 2022
- First award: 26 December 2022
- Final award: 6 October 2023

Highlights
- Total: 42
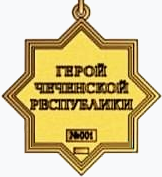
- Reverse
- Related: Hero of the Russian Federation; Hero of the Soviet Union; Hero of Labour of the Russian Federation; Hero of Ukraine; Hero of Belarus; Hero of Kazakhstan; Hero of the Donetsk People's Republic; Hero of the Luhansk People's Republic; Hero of Uzbekistan

The title of Hero of the Chechen Republic (Russian: Герой Чеченской Республики, romanized: Geroy Chechenskoy Respubliki) is the highest title of the Chechen Republic of the Russian Federation, awarded by the Head of the Chechen Republic for outstanding services to the Chechen Republic. The award was established by the head of the Chechen Republic Ramzan Kadyrov on October 31, 2022.

The "Hero of the Chechen Republic" medal is an eight-pointed gold star with convex faceted rays and a relief image of a Chechen ornament. The star is bordered by a convex rim 0.5 mm wide. The distance between the ends of the star's rays is 35 mm.

== Notable awardees ==
Among those awarded (partial list):

- Ramzan Kadyrov, head of the Chechen Republic (December 26, 2022)
- Adam Delimkhanov, member of the State Duma for Chechnya (April 17, 2023)
- Ruslan Alkhanov, minister of Internal Affairs of the Chechen Republic (April 17, 2023)
- Adam Kadyrov, son of Ramzan Kadyrov and secretary of the Republic's Security Council
- Magomed Daudov, prime minister of the Chechen Republic
- Apti Alaudinov, commander of the "Akhmat" Spetsnaz and deputy commander of the 2nd Army Corps
- Khas-Magomed Kadyrov, mayor of Grozny
- Anton Grunis, commander of the 4th Separate Guards Motor Rifle Brigade
- Viktor Zolotov, Director of the National Guard
