= Order of Kadyrov =

Order of Kadyrov (Орден Кадырова)
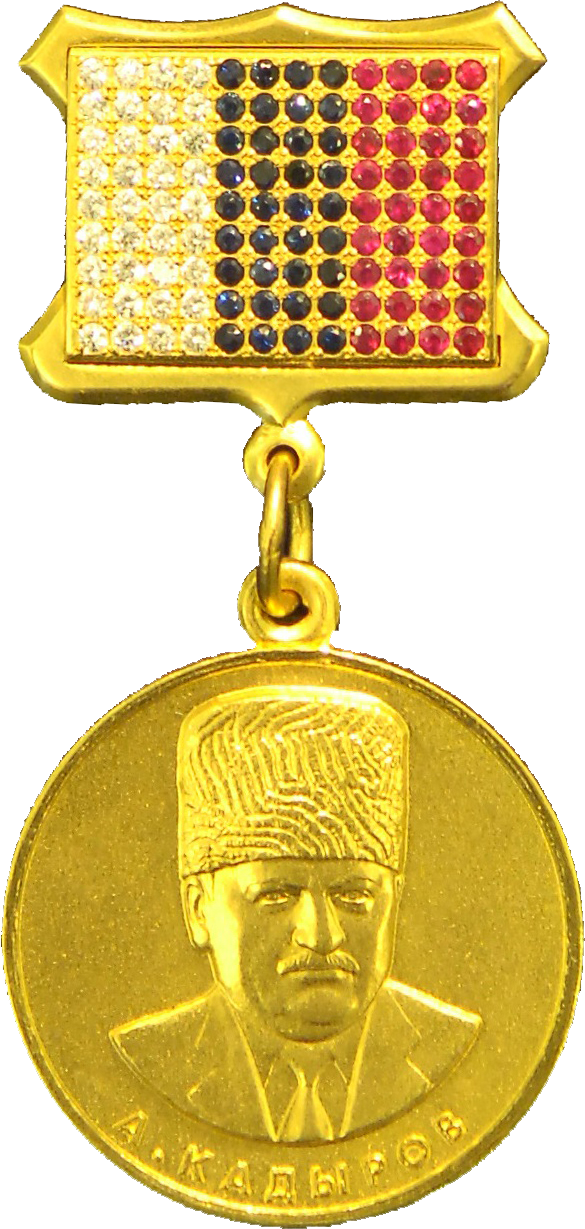
- Order of Kadyrov
- Type: Single grade order
- Presented by: Chechen Republic
- Eligibility: Russian and foreign citizens
- Status: Active
- Established: 19 August 2004

Order of Kadyrov (Russian: Орден Кадырова; is the highest state award of the Chechen Republic. It was established on August 19, 2004, in memory of Akhmat Kadyrov, President of the Chechen Republic, who was assassinated in a terrorist attack.

== History ==
The Order was established by Decree No. 208 of the president of the Chechen Republic of August 19, 2004, "On the Order of Kadyrov," which was repealed by Decree No. 212 of the head of the Chechen Republic of November 24, 2015, "On the Order of Kadyrov", which approved the new statute of the Order, provided its description, and provided a drawing of the Order.

The Order is awarded for outstanding service to the Chechen Republic.

== Statute ==
The Order of Kadyrov is awarded to outstanding statesmen and public figures, Chechen performers and dancers, citizens, and organizations for exceptional achievements in the development of statehood, labor achievements, and the strengthening of peace, friendship, and cooperation between peoples, contributing to the prosperity and glory of the Chechen Republic.

Recipients of the Order of Kadyrov are invited by the head of the Chechen Republic and the Government of the Chechen Republic to all events dedicated to state holidays and other important events in the Chechen Republic.

== Description ==
The Order of Kadyrov is made of 750-carat gold and is a circle with a convex border, 33 mm in diameter, weighing 55-60 grams.

The obverse depicts a portrait of the first president of the Chechen Republic, A. Kadyrov. On the reverse side, at the top of the order, is the inscription in raised letters "SON OF HIS PEOPLE" around the circumference. In the center of the order is a two-line inscription: "HE GONE" and "UNDEFEATED." Below is the order's serial number and a raised five-pointed star.

The order is attached to a rectangular gold bar by an eyelet and ring. The bar consists of two plates: the main (back) and the obverse (front).

The obverse (convex) bar is encrusted with precious stones: 36 rubies (1.8 carats), 36 sapphires (1.8 carats), and 36 diamonds (1.08 carats). The bar is 18 mm high and 23 mm wide.

The back of the block (flat) has two horizontal slits at the top and bottom, height 21 mm, width 23 mm, and a pin on the back. The gold standard is indicated on the pin mount at the bottom.

== Selected receipents ==
=== Foreign nationals ===
- Nursultan Nazarbayev, 2007
- Gaza Sherbini, 2007
- Kenes Rakishev, 2008
- Allahshukur Pashazade, 2009

=== Figures outside the Chechen Republic ===
- Dmitry Kozak
- Yuri Luzhkov
- Gennady Troshev
- Rashid Nurgaliyev
- Zurab Tsereteli
- Vladimir Putin, 2007 (delivered in 2023)
- Sergei Ivanov, 2007
- Leonid Slutsky, 2007
- Vyacheslav Lebedev
- Sergey Abramov
- Viktor Zolotov, 2016
- Vladimir Chub
- Buvaisar Saitiev
- Abubakar Arsamakov, 2010
- Adilgerei Magomedtagirov
- Gadzhi Makhachev
- Ismail Berdiyev
- Denis Pushilin, 2022
- Viktor Sadovnichiy, 2023
- Valentina Matvienko, 2024

=== Figures of the Chechen Republic ===
- Aimani Kadyrova
- Sulim Yamadayev
- Ramzan Kadyrov
- Muslim Khuchiev, 2007 - prime minister of Chechnya
- Magomed Daudov, 2006 - prime minister of Chechnya
- Alvi Karimov
- Zarubek Saidov - rector of the Chechen State University
- Dukuvakha Abdurakhmanov
- Dzhambulat Umarov
- Khadizhat Kadyrova
- Akhmat Ramzanovich Kadyrov
- Adam Kadyrov

=== Organizations ===
- State Dance Ensemble "Vainakh"

== See also ==
- Hero of the Chechen Republic
