= 2005 Chechen legislative election =

- 27 November 2005
- Turnout: 69.56%
Party	Leader	Seats
Council of the Republic
United Russia	Dukuvakha Abdurakhmanov	9
CPRF	Said-Khamzat Arsanov	3
Eurasian Union	Said Yusupov	1
Independents	n/a	5
People's Assembly
United Russia	Dukuvakha Abdurakhmanov	24
SPS	Zinaida Magomadova	4
CPRF	Said-Khamzat Arsanov	3
Independents	n/a	9
This lists parties that won seats. See the complete results below.

The 2005 Chechen legislative election was held on November 27 of that year. This was the first parliamentary election in the Chechen Republic since the constitutional referendum that took place in 2003 and resulted in the adoption of the Constitution of the Chechen Republic.

== Background ==
In August 2005 Russian president Vladimir Putin signed a presidential decree "On the election to Parliament of the Chechen Republic of the first convocation" announcing the election were to be held on November 27.

== Electoral system ==
The first Parliament of the Chechen Republic was a bicameral legislative body with Council of the Republic as its upper house and People's Assembly as lower house. 18 members of the Council were elected in municipality-based single-member districts. 40 members of the People's Assembly were elected via parallel voting (20 seats in a republic-wide party-list vote with 5% electoral threshold and 20 seats in single-member districts).

== Results ==
People's Assembly
Party	Proportional			District seats	Total seats
Party	Votes	%	Seats	District seats	Total seats
United Russia	251,737	60.65%	14	10	24
Union of Right Forces	51,419	12.39%	3	1	4
Communist Party	50,644	12.20%	3	0	3
Eurasian Union	15,973	3.85%	0	0	0
Yabloko	13,087	3.15%	0	0	0
Rodina	9,904	2.39%	0	0	0
Liberal Democratic Party	6,044	1.46%	0	0	0
People's Will	5,343	1.29%	0	0	0
Independent	–	–	0	9	9
Against all	6,274	1.51%			
Invalid ballots	4,606	1.10%			
Total	415,031	100%	20	20	40
Registered voters/turnout	596,567	69.56%			
