= 7th Guards Brigade =

7th Guards Brigade may refer to:

- 7th Guards Brigade (Croatia)
- 7th Separate Guards Motor Rifle Brigade, Russia
- 7th Separate Guards Tank Brigade, Russia

== See also ==
- 7th Brigade (disambiguation)
