= Grunis =

Grunis, is a Ashkenazi Jewish surname.

Notable people with the surname include:

- Anton Grunis (1979-2026), Russian Major general.
- Asher Grunis (born 1945), the President of the Supreme Court of Israel between 2012 and 2015.
