= Anton Grunis =

Russian military officer (1979–2026)

- Антон Грунис
- Grunis in 2026
- Born: 5 October 1979; Kazan, Tatar ASSR, Russian SFSR, Soviet Union
- Died: 13 September 2026 (aged 46); Horlivka, Russian occupation of Donetsk Oblast, Ukraine
- Military career
- Allegiance: Russia
- Branch: Russian Ground Forces
- Rank: Major general
- Nickname: Call sign "Grozny"
- Commands: 4th Separate Motor Rifle Brigade
- Conflicts: Second Chechen War; Russo-Georgian War; Syrian civil war; Russian intervention; 2022 Russian invasion of Ukraine
- Awards: Hero of the Russian Federation; Hero of the Donetsk People's Republic; Hero of the Chechen Republic; Order of Courage (3); Medal of the Order "For Merit to the Fatherland", 1st class; Medal of the Order "For Merit to the Fatherland", 2nd class; Medal "For Combat Distinction"; Medal "For Military Valor", 2nd class; Medal for Participation in the Special Military Operation

Anton Feliksovich Grunis (Russian: Антон Феликсович Грунис; 5 October 1979 – 13 September 2026) was a Russian military officer, who was commander of the 4th Separate Guards Motor Rifle Brigade, and a Major general (2024). He participated in the Russian intervention in the Syrian civil war and the 2022 Russian invasion of Ukraine. Hero of the Russian Federation (2026).

== Biography ==
Anton Grunis was born in Kazan in 1979. In 1996, he graduated from the Kazan Suvorov Military School and the Moscow Higher Combined Arms Command School.

He participated in the Second Chechen War, the Russo-Georgian War, the 2014 Russian annexation of Crimea, and the Russian intervention in the Syrian civil war. In 2021, Anton Grunis was discharged to the reserve.

In 2023, Grunis returned to the army and became chief of staff of the 123rd Separate Guards Motor Rifle Brigade, which, together with units of the Wagner Group, participated in the Battle of Bakhmut. Following the death of the 4th Separate Motor Rifle Brigade commander Vyacheslav Makarov, Grunis succeeded him.

By decree of the President of Russia dated 2 May 2024, Colonel Grunis was promoted to the military rank of Major general.

By the summer of 2026, he commanded the 4th Separate Guards Motor Rifle Brigade of the 3rd Guards Combined Arms Army of the Southern Military District. The brigade is part of the "South" Group of Forces. He distinguished himself in the Battle of Kostiantynivka. On 4 July, Anton Grunis reported to Vladimir Putin by video link on the details of the capture of Kostiantynivka.

In 2026, by decree of the President of the Russian Federation, Grunis was awarded the title Hero of the Russian Federation for heroism, courage and bravery displayed in the performance of military duty.

Grunis was killed on 13 September 2026, at the age of 46. Robert Brovdi, commander of the Unmanned Systems Forces of Ukraine, published a video showing a drone strike on a private house in which, according to Brovdi, Grunis was killed. The strike was geolocated in the occupied city of Horlivka.

== Awards ==
The Gold Star medal and a named weapon were presented to Grunis by the Minister of Defence of the Russian Federation Andrey Belousov on 28 August 2026.
