= Guerrilla phase of the Second Chechen War (2007) =

Part of a Russian war in the Caucasus

== Timeline ==
=== January ===
- January 11 - Security forces killed three alleged guerrillas in an apartment block in the Dagestani capital of Makhachkala.
- January 29 - Four reconnaissance unit soldiers from the battalion Vostok and one guerrilla were killed after a gunbattle in a forest near the city of Gudermes; the guerrilla who lost his life reportedly blew himself up to evade capture. A further two Russians were killed when they came under attack in the Shatoy region, high in the Caucasus mountains.

=== February ===
- February 2 - Chechen police killed four militants in a security operation in Kurchaloy, Chechnya Interior Minister Ruslan Alkhanov said. He said three militants were killed in the clash and that another was wounded before blowing himself up with a hand grenade.
- February 3 - Two guerrillas, including a woman, were killed in a security operation in the town of Malgobek, Ingushetia. Two policemen were killed during an unsuccessful attempt to assassinate Dagestani Interior Minister Adilgerei Magomedtagirov in Makhachkala; another policemen was shot dead in the same city earlier that day.
- February 7 - Mairbek Murdagaliyev, deputy head of the Vedensky District administration, was killed in a blast of an explosive device planted at the door of his house.
- February 13 - Four rebels and two policemen were killed in the village of Ishkoi-Yurt, eastern Chechnya. The rebels were said to be hiding out in a deserted house when they were located and killed by the security forces.
- February 23 - Five policemen were killed and two wounded by a blast during a mine disposal operation in the east Chechen village of Oyskhara.
- February 24 - Three guerrillas were killed in Dagestan's Kizlyarsky District. The owner of the house where the guerrillas hid was also killed.

=== March ===
- March 19 - Chechen president Ramzan Kadyrov vowed to put an end to all remaining guerrilla activity in Chechnya within two months.
- March 21 - Tahir Batayev, a Kumyk-Chechen commander of the northeastern front of the Chechen resistance forces, was killed in a shoot-out in Gudermes with federal forces.
- March 23 - Four guerrillas have been killed in a clash with federal troops near the village of Tazen-Kale in Chechnya's Vedensky District.
- March 24 - Soldiers from a reconnaissance sub-unit of the Internal Troops of the Russian Ministry of Internal Affairs under command of Lieutenant Colonel Alexei Korgun opened fire on three women-local residents who were gathering ramson in a large forest near Urdyukhoi village, Shatoi District. Later, the militaries declared that they had opened fire as took the women for militants. As a result of the shelling, Khaldat Mutakova, a teacher of the local school, was shot dead, and her sister Zalpa Mutakova and Zaira Kasumova were heavily wounded. The latter became invalid from the caused injury. In 2008 the Grozny Garrison Military Court sentenced Alexei Korgun, Lieutenant Colonel of Internal Troops of the Russian MIA, guilty of the death of a woman-resident of the Shatoy District of Chechnya, to three years of conditional imprisonment.
- March 25 - Rebels published a video of an APC attack near the village of Dargo (Vedensky District) in which they say four soldiers were killed. One soldier died and three were wounded by a roadside bomb outside Gekhi-Chu, Urus-Martan District.
- March 27 - A resident by the name of Radik Bapinaev was shot dead by police forces at an attempt to detain him. Officials asserted that the resident was guilty of crimes and refused to release the body to his relatives. His mother has since been campaigning to stop the criminal prosecution of her son which she calls unjustified, and to release his body to her.

=== April ===
- April 5 - Kadyrov government forces killed a top Chechen rebel commander Amir Khayrullah (Suleiman Imurzayev) suspected of assassinating President Akhmad Kadyrov. Khayrullah was named a rebel vice-premier on March 7, 2007.
- April 12 - Rebel sources claimed a victory in the several days of heavy fighting near the village of Bas-Gordali (Nozhai-Yurt district) and reported killing dozens of pro-Moscow Chechen soldiers and militiamen including three commanders. The website of Nezavisimaya Gazeta reported four days earlier that two Interior Ministry servicemen, including a commander of the elite Sever (North) battalion, were killed in the area.
- April 19 - Six Russian policemen from Karelia were injured during a night attack on a checkpoint on the outskirts of the Chechen capital Grozny.
- April 27 - Russian military Mi-8 helicopter with infantry was reported to be downed by automatic rifle fire in Chechnya, killing all 20 people abroad, among them 15 Spetsnaz GRU commandos and two army officers. It was one of three helicopters carrying special forces troops sent to reinforce the federal task force fighting the rebels near the village of Shatoy where at least three rebels and five federal troops died.

=== May ===
- May 7 - A Russian spokesman said three policemen and three militants were killed in a clash in Vedensky District, while four other servicemen were wounded. A police patrol commander was shot dead in Shalinsky District.
- May 14 - Police said three militants were killed and three police commandos injured in a fierce firefight on Sheikh Mansur Street in Khasavyurt, Dagestan.

=== June ===
- June 2 - Three suspected Chechen rebels and two policemen were killed in clashes in the forest in Dagestan near the border with Chechnya, officials said.
- June 15 - Magomedali Aliyev, head of the Untsukulsky District police department, was killed in Dagestan.
- June 19 - At least three policemen were wounded in the attack on the special-task force base in Karabulak, Ingushetia.
- June 21 - A gun battle between police forces and a Defense Ministry unit in Grozny left several people dead and wounded among the local policemen and soldiers. Later reports said five soldiers of the battalion Zapad were killed and three policemen wounded in the incident involving up to 200 armed soldiers and police officers. Several policemen were wounded in a rebel attack on OMON base in Karabulak, Ingushetia.

=== July ===
- July 1 - A mine detonation killed two Russian soldiers and wounded two others in Vedensky District of Chechnya. A drive-by attack on a truck carrying Russian soldiers in Shalinsky District killed one soldier and wounded two others and a civilian passerby.
- July 6 - Several dozen of rebels in Russia's North Caucasus region used firearms and grenade launchers to attack a Russian military base in Ingushetia. The number of casualties was disputed.
- July 8 - Suspected rebel commander Yunus Akhmadov killed Saipudi Lorsanov, a senior police officer, and was himself killed by the police during a shootout in Grozny. An ambush elsewhere in Chechnya left one Russian combat engineer dead and another one injured, while a police officer was injured in a car bombing in Kabardino-Balkaria.
- July 10 - Three Russian soldiers were killed and five others wounded in an ambush on a sapper convoy in southeastern Chechnya; among the casualties were three unit commanders. In another incident, 11 members of OMON from Samara Oblast were injured in a road accident in Chechnya. On the same day, Ramzan Kadyrov declared in his first State of the Nation address that the hostilities in Chechnya had "finally and irreversibly" ended; however, all Russian interior ministry units in Chechnya had been put on an increased state of alert.
- July 18 - A bomb blast in Dagestan killed four policemen and wounded up to eight during their morning physical exercises in the town of Kizilyurt. In Chechnya, a drunken Russian soldier shot dead his commanding officer and wounded three other soldiers and then himself. A bomb targeting a funeral procession of an ethnic Russian woman shot dead in Ingusehtia wounded at least 10 people, including four police officers.
- July 19 - Two policemen and were killed and two wounded during a gun attack on a police outpost near the village of Assinovskaya, Chechnya. Two militants were killed and six police officers wounded in a clash in Kurchaloi District of the republic.
- July 21 - Gunmen in Karabulak, Ingushetia, killed Vakha Vedzizhev, a well-known figure in the republic and an adviser to Ingushetia's president on religious matters.
- July 23 - Separatist website announced the death from wounds of the rebel commander identified as Amir Muslim. In Chechnya, at least 11 police officers and one soldier have been wounded in clashes and explosions, including five injured in an attack in Grozny, while one federal soldier was killed and one wounded in another skirmish near the village of Tazen-Kala, Interior Ministry said. In Ingushetia, one police officer was killed and one wounded when gunmen opened fire on their patrol vehicle, while a police major was fatally shot in Kabardino-Balkaria.
- July 26 - At least two people, including Khura-Magomed Ramazanov, a senior Islamic cleric in Dagestan, were killed by a radio-controlled bomb in Makhachkala. A massive security sweep operation was launched in Ingushetia, sparked by another assassination attempt on President Zyazikov. In the next few days hundreds of men have been rounded up in the sweeps, while several security officers were killed and wounded in the continued attacks in Ingushetia. Moscow sent in an additional 2,500 MVD troops, almost tripling the number of special forces in Ingushetia.

=== August ===
- August 3 - Five militants, one soldier, and the deputy chief of police in the city of Buinaksk were killed in Dagestan. Kadyrov announced "with all responsibility" that there will be no militants left in Chechnya by the end of 2007.
- August 8 - Two MVD servicemen were killed in a silenced sniper rifle attack in Grozny.
- August 23 - Two elite policemen and one soldier were killed and 17 troops wounded in two ambushes in Ingushetia and Dagestan, officials said. Two policemen and a Chechen gunman armed with a pistol were killed in a shootout in Grozny.
- August 30 - Two border troops were killed by gunmen near Nazran, Ingushetia, while a soldier was wounded in an attack on a convoy in Chechnya. A teenage suspected militant and three ethnic Russian civilians were shot dead in two separate incidents in Nazran.
- August 31 - Four policemen died and three to five other people were injured in the explosion of a car bomb in the center of Nazran.

=== September ===
- September 1 – Six pro-Russian Chechen troops were reported killed in the ambush near the mountain village of Sharo-Argun.
- September 2 – A violent confrontation between the FSB and the local police took place in Karabulak in Ingushetia after a suspected militant was killed by the federal agents.
- September 4 – Insurgent raid on a settlement of Glukhoi in Chechnya killed one and wounded four policemen, Interior Ministry spokesman said.
- September 5 - The FSB said two armed men, including a militant leader, were killed by its patrol while trying to cross the border to Karachayevo-Cherkessia from Georgia.
- September 6 - Two OMON policemen from the republic of Buryatia were shot and killed in the Chechen village of Alpatovo, Itar-Tass reported.
- September 8 - Alleged rebel commander Musa Mutiyev has been "liquidated" in Grozny, Chechen Interior Minister said. Two warrant officers were wounded in an attack on an army truck in Dagestan.
- September 9 – One serviceman died and two were wounded in an attack on Interior Ministry base in Malgobek, Ingushetia; two of the attackers were also killed, officials said. A local GRU serviceman and a militant suspect were killed on the outskirts of the village of Pervomayskoye in the Groznensky District of Chechnya.
- September 12 – Three servicemen were killed and two were wounded in two clashes in Chechnya; one rebel fighter also died. Another soldier was wounded by a booby trap while on reconnaissance mission.
- September 18 - Dagestani insurgent leader Rappani Khalilov and his deputy Nabi Nabiyev were surrounded and killed in Dagestan; at least two policemen were wounded in the overnight battle. Major Androkhman Meiriyev, chief investigator of western Ingushetia, was shot dead in the village of Ordzhonikidzevskaya.
- September 20 - Two OMON troopers from Rostov Oblast were killed and two wounded in a gun attack on a Lada Niva police vehicle in Nazran. Also in Ingushetia, a Ural truck was shot at on the Kavkaz highway near the village of Yandare, wounding two servicemen. In Dagestan, Omar Sheikhullayev and Ismail Akhmedov, two Dagestani militant leaders, and a Russian special forces officer were killed in the battle, police said.
- September 29 – Kavkaz Center claimed seven soldiers were killed during an ambush in Tazen-Gala under the command of Amir Aslambek. They released a video of the operation which circulates on the internet. According to the Jamestown Foundation, those who were ambushed were men of the Sever Spetsnaz unit, which is composed of Kadyrovtsy.

=== October ===
- October 5 - Fifteen men from Chechnya's Oil Regiment (Kadyrovtsy) were reportedly killed in fighting in the Shatoysky District.
- October 7 - At least four local troops killed and 16 hospitalized in the 2007 Zhani-Vedeno ambush. One militant died during the ambush.
- October 9 - Special forces killed two rebels and arrested another during a house siege in Makhachkala, Dagestan, the Interior Ministry said. Two militants and an Interior Troops officer were killed and another five soldiers and one fighter were wounded in three incidents in Chechnya, local law enforcements officials said. In Ingushetia gunmen opened fire on two policemen who stopped their car in Nazran, killing both.
- October 18 - Gunmen opened fire at a police car in Magas, capital of Ingushetia, killing four federal police officers, authorities said.
- October 21 - Two rebels were killed in the Urus Martan region of Chechnya, the Russian Interior Ministry said Monday. Rebel sources said the killed were the commander of the Shatoi sector,(Ramzan Saluyev), killed by a sniper bullet, and his assistant, who blew up himself 45 minutes later. Rebels claimed the assistant killed two Soldiers until his ammunition ran out.

=== November ===
- November 4 - The bodies of 9 hunters and huntsmen were found executed in the woods of Kabardino-Balkaria. The victims were deprived of their rifles, mobile phones and hunting knives. According to the FSB, the Yarmuk Jamaat was responsible for the killings. According to Valery Ustov, head of the Investigatory Committee (IC) of the Kabardino-Balkarian Republic (KBR), the killers could have taken the hunters for militiamen, since they were dressed in camouflage. Kavkaz Center published an interview of a leader of the Jamaat named "Amir Salih" who claimed the Jamaat was responsible for the killings and claimed the hunters and huntsmen were Russians related to the FSB and MVD.
- November 9 - A six-year-old boy was killed by security forces in Ingushetia inside a house in the village of Chemulga. According officials the boy, Rakhim Amriev, was accidentally shot during a special operation targeting a suspected militant who had allegedly taken refuge in the home of his father Ramzan Amriev. The parents and relatives of Rakhim Amriev said they were convinced that the six-year-old boy was killed by a deliberate gunshot to the head and not because of a ricocheting bullet. Kommersant reported on November 12 that the republic's law-enforcement structures in fact had no claims against Ramzan Amriev and had raided his house on November 9 in order to detain a certain "Makhauri" who was on the republic's wanted list for allegedly being a rebel. Ramzan Amriev told Kommersant: "Makhauri is our distant relative, but he lives in the village of Assinovskaya and has never stayed with us." Amriev said he believed someone slandered his family and that the federal security forces targeted his home without verifying the accusation.
- November 12 - Russian troops supported by armoured vehicles stormed a house in Makhachkala, killing 7 militants, including two women, police said. Meanwhile, police stormed an apartment building in another part of the city.
- November 15 - The head of the local transportation police has been killed in Ingushetia, while another police officer was killed in Dagestan. Two policemen from the Khanty–Mansi Autonomous Okrug were injured in an attack on their car in Chechnya.

=== December ===
- December 16 - Four Chechen fighters, including a woman, and one policeman were killed in a clash during a sweep operation in Grozny; three other policemen were wounded (according to Kavkaz Center, eight to 12 Chechen police were killed).
- December 27 - Several militants ambushed a border guards' vehicle, killing two officers and wounding two other servicemen, the Ingush Interior Ministry said. Unidentified gunmen shot and killed a local police officer in Grozny, the Chechen Interior Ministry said.

=== Overall ===
- 2007 - In November a newspaper published that at Least 150 Servicemen and Police were killed so far in Chechnya (excluding other republics) According to Ruslan Alkhanov, Interior Minister of Chechnya, 82 policemen died in 2007 during their service in Chechnya, with a large increase in the last two months. The Defense Ministry of Russia reported 442 servicemen died in the armed forces in 2007, including 180 deaths because of accidents and 224 suicides. 54 soldiers and officers died in Chechnya. Alkhanov also claimed 72 rebels were killed in Chechnya, 32 were arrested and 139 had surrendered. A total of 192 militants and armed rebels were killed and more than 700 arrested in operations in Russia's North Caucasus last year, a deputy interior minister Arkady Yedelev reported.
