= Isa Tumkhadzhiev =

Chechen politician (born 1981)

- Иса Тумхаджиев

First Deputy Prime Minister of Chechnya
- Incumbent
- Assumed office June 2018
- Prime Minister: Muslim Khuchiev himself (Acting); Magomed Daudov

Acting Prime Minister of the Chechen Republic
- In office 21 May 2024 – 25 May 2024
- Preceded by: Muslim Khuchiev
- Succeeded by: Magomed Daudov

Minister of Car roads of Chechnya
- In office 4 November 2023 – 21 May 2024
- Preceded by: Abubakar Tumkhadzhiev

Personal details
- Born: 1981 (age 44–45)
- Party: United Russia
- Parent: Abubakar Tumkhadzhiev (father)
- Education: Dagestan State University of National Economy; Russian Presidential Academy of National Economy and Public Administration

Isa Abubakarovich Tumkhadzhiev (Russian: Иса Абубакарович Тумхаджиев, born 1981) is a Russian politician, who is currently serving as the First Deputy Prime Minister of the Chechen Republic since June 2018. He also served as the acting Prime Minister in May 2024 and Minister of the Car Roads of Chechnya from 2023 to 2024.

Much like many of the other civil servants of the Chechen Republic, Tumkhadzhiev is related to the Head of the Republic, Ramzan Kadyrov, as he is married to a relative of Kadyrov and is, therefore, his son-in-law. Isa Tumkhadzhiev is also the son of Abubakar Tumkhadzhiev, former Minister of Car roads and Deputy Prime Minister of Chechnya.

== Biography ==
=== Early life and education ===
Isa Tumkhadzhiev was born in 1981. From 2001 to 2006, Tumkhadzhiev studied in the Dagestan State University of National Economy, specifically in the "organisation management" department.

Later, he also ended his education in the Russian Presidential Academy of National Economy and Public Administration and got the title of "manager specializing in state municipal management".

=== Career ===
Tumkhadzhiev started his career in January 2007 as Advisor to the Chairman of the Government of the Chechen Republic (also known as the Prime Minister). After that, from April 2007 until February 2009, he was Advisor of the President of the Chechen Republic.

From February 2009 to July 2010, he was appointed as Assistant to the President of Chechnya, and afterwards, until April 2011, he worked as the Deputy Head of the Administration of the President of the Chechen Republic.

From April 2011 to 17 May 2012, he was the Deputy Chairman of the Government of the Chechen Republic and afterwards. Afterwards, from 22 May 2012 to 24 May 2012 he was Acting Chairman of the Government of the Chechen Republic.

On 24 May 2012, he became First Deputy Chairman of the Chechen Government.

In November 2023, Tumkhadzhiev succeeded his father as Minister of Car roads of Chechnya, but continued his deputyship, making his full title "First Deputy Chairman of the Government of the Chechen Republic — Minister of Car roads".

On 21 May 2024, Tumkhadzhiev became Acting Prime Minister of the Republic after the resignation of Muslim Khuchiev. After the appointment of Magomed Daudov as Prime Minister that took three days, Tumkhadzhiev ended his role as Acting Prime Minister.

== Awards, titles and decorations ==
Isa Tumkhadzhiev's awards and titles include:

- II class Medal of the Order "For Merit to the Fatherland";
- IV class Medal of the Order "For Merit to the Fatherland";
- Order of Akhmad Kadyrov;
- Honoured Builder of Chechnya.
