= Apti Alaudinov =

Russian–Chechen military leader (born 1973)

- Апти Алаудинов
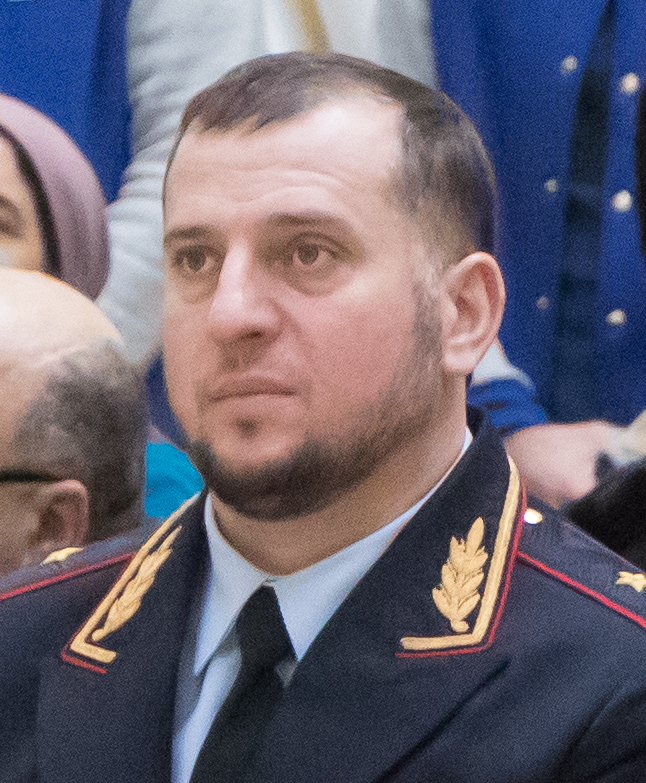
- Alaudinov in 2017

Deputy Minister of Internal Affairs for the Chechnya
- In office June 2002 – 18 March 2021
- President: Akhmad Kadyrov; Alu Alkhanov; Ramzan Kadyrov
- Succeeded by: Aslan Iraskhanov

Personal details
- Born: 5 October 1973 (age 53) Gorny, Stavropol Krai, Russian SFSR, Soviet Union
- Nickname: Yellow pants

Military service
- Allegiance: Russia
- Years of service: 2001–present
- Rank: Lieutenant General
- Battles/wars: Russo-Ukrainian war; Battle of Lysychansk; Kursk offensive (2024–2025)

Apti Aronovich Alaudinov (Russian: Апти Аронович Алаудинов; born 5 October 1973) is a Russian Lieutenant general, commander of the "Akhmat" Spetsnaz and deputy head of the Main Military-Political Directorate of the Russian Armed Forces.

== Early life ==
He was born into a Chechen family. His father was an officer in the Soviet Army.

During the Chechen civil war and the First Chechen War in the 1990s, Alaudinov lost around 20 close relatives, including his father, uncle, and older brother at the hands of Chechen separatist forces. Apti's family fought on the side of Russia in both Chechen wars. However, Apti did not participate in them.

In 2001, he graduated from the Chechen State University with a degree in jurisprudence.

In the Second Chechen War, Apti continued to support the federal forces, this time of Vladimir Putin.

== Career ==
=== Chechen Interior Ministry’s organised crime unit ===
Alaudinov started his career in the Chechen Interior Ministry's organised crime unit. He was seen at the Moscow assassination of special forces commander Movladi Baisarov in November 2006. The operation was led by Kadyrov lieutenant Adam Delimkhanov.

=== Deputy Interior Minister ===
A man who criticised local officials and Kadyrov in a YouTube appeal to the Russian President became a target of threats and had to flee to Dagestan. In May 2016, his house was burnt down by a group of masked men, and his family was dragged out, put in a car, and thrown under a bridge. His wife stated that they threatened the other residents if they reported the matter to anyone. Later, the Chechen police cordoned off his village to hunt him down. Kadyrov's spokesman denied these reports were true. The complainant later publicly apologised to Kadyrov and accused the media of distorting his remarks in his video complaint. He again fled to Dagestan in November 2016. According to human rights activist Svetlana Gannushkina, he had to flee after Alaudinov, who was then Chechnya's Deputy Interior Minister, threatened to kill him.

In 2019, Alaudinov was detained in a Kadyrov-administered purge of federalists associated with Ibragim Temirbaev, a now-deposed mayor of Argun, Chechen Republic who was killed in a car accident two years later. After August 2019, Alaudinov absented himself from the Ministry, although he was still paid his salary. He later fled to safety in Moscow until March 2022. On 17 March 2022, Ramzan Kadyrov announced he was sending 1,000 troops to fight in the 2022 Russian invasion of Ukraine, and that they would be led by Alaudinov.

In July 2022, Alaudinov was made secretary of the Chechen Security Council by Kadyrov.

In September 2022, Alaudinov was appointed commander of the Akhmat volunteer special forces unit.

On 13 February 2023, Alaudinov was reportedly poisoned by a letter laced with toxin. He was discharged from the hospital on 25 February 2023 and returned to the special operation zone in the Ukraine.

In April 2024, the Danish and Swedish governments published a report which listed Alaudinov as one of four leaders of the Chechens. On April 16, Russian President Vladimir Putin signed an order appointing Alaudinov as deputy head of the Main Directorate for Military-Political Work of the Defense Ministry, making him responsible for political obedience in the army.

In April 2024, it was claimed that Alaudinov had been for a time estranged from Kadyrov: "Alaudinov has managed to survive in Chechnya despite initially being on the opposing side to the Kadyrov clan, and even being banished from Chechnya five years ago. As war broke out in Ukraine, Alaudinov finally got a chance to atone for his sins and help Kadyrov save his private army from ruin." In May 2024, Radio Free Europe/Radio Liberty cited Russian opposition sources stating that Alaudinov had a good reputation within the Russian federal government after helping integrate former Wagner Group members into the Akhmat spetsaz following the Wagner Group rebellion, and was favored as a successor to Kadyrov by the defense establishment.

In June 2024, Alaudinov was deployed to the Kharkiv oblast.

On 20 June 2024, Alaudinov made an appearance on the national TV broadcast of Olga Skabeyeva, where he talked about the end of the SMO. He figures that the Ukrainian forces have been heavily drawn to Kharkiv Oblast where they will in 2024 be destroyed in a final battle.

On 9 August, Alaudinov said that Ukrainian forces had gained ground in an incursion into Kursk Oblast, where the Kadyrovites had been stationed since April 2024.

On 19 August, Alaudinov berated Russians who complained that conscripts were forced to defend Kursk Oblast. Conscripts had been exempted by Vladimir Putin from serving in the Russian invasion of Ukraine and he never expected the Ukrainians to attack Russia. Alaudinov promised those who were killed would go straight to heaven. A Moscologist said that whereas the FSB and Kadyrovites had been tasked with protecting the border, now that the Ukrainians had made progress in Russia, some conscripts from the Leningrad Military District and the Moscow Military District had been sent to Kursk as reinforcements, and the Daily Telegraph said Alaudinov mocked the mothers of the conscripts.

On 30 November 2025, he repeated many of his former claims and promises in a public speech at the Forum on Russian Identity.
