= Magomed Daudov =

Prime Minister of the Chechen Republic since 2024

- Магомед Даудов; Дауди Мохьмад
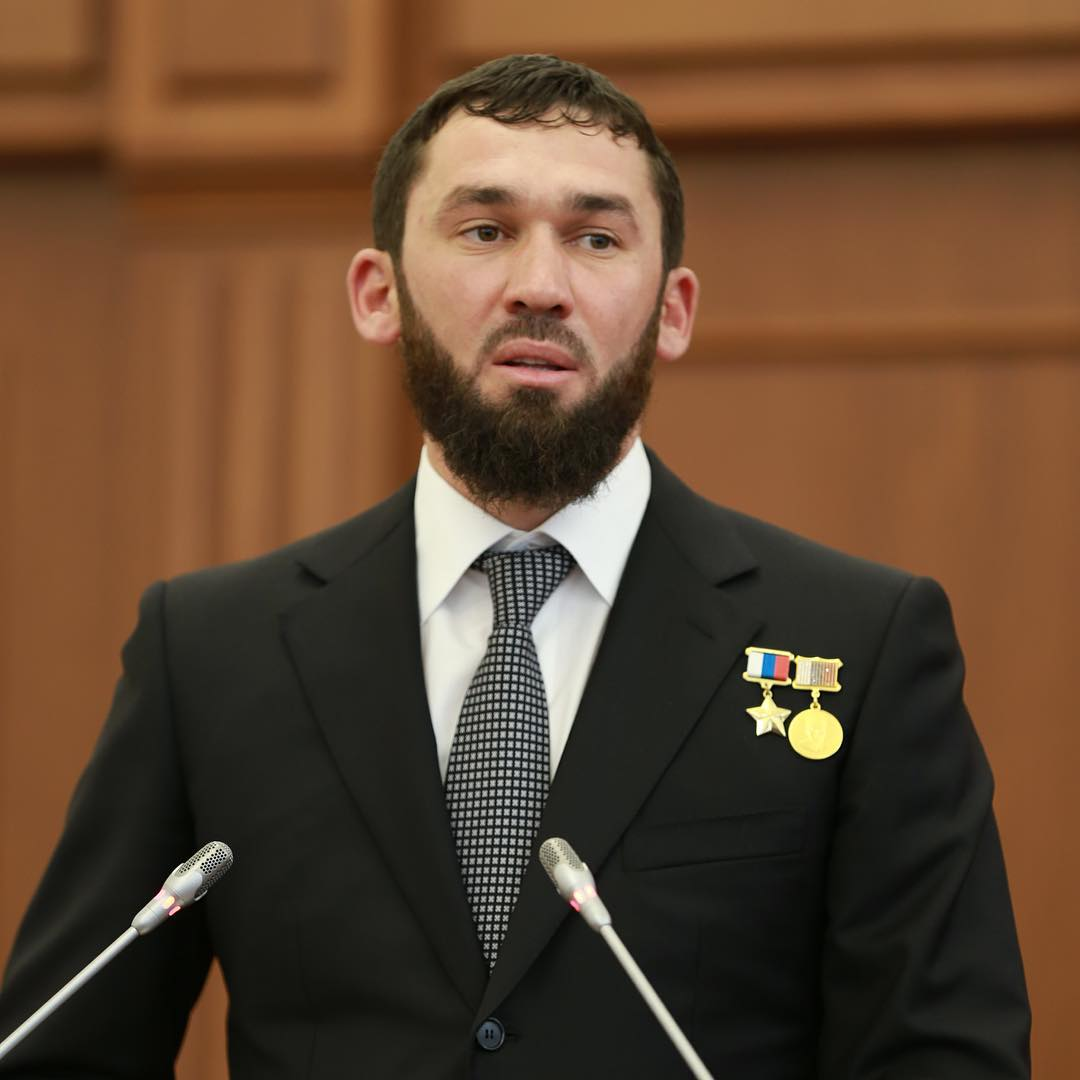
- Daudov in 2016

Prime Minister of the Chechen Republic
- Incumbent
- Assumed office 25 May 2024
- Head: Ramzan Kadyrov
- Preceded by: Isa Tumkhadzhiev (acting)

Chairman of the Parliament of the Chechen Republic
- In office 3 July 2015 – 15 May 2024
- Preceded by: Dukuvakha Abdurakhmanov
- Succeeded by: Shaid Zhamaldayev

Chief of Staff of the Chechen Government
- In office 21 May 2012 – 3 June 2015
- Preceded by: Magomed Selimkhanov
- Succeeded by: Islam Kadyrov

First Deputy Prime Minister of the Chechen Republic
- In office 10 March 2010 – 21 May 2012
- Preceded by: Khalid Vaykhanov
- Succeeded by: Isa Tumkhadzhiev

Personal details
- Born: 26 February 1980 (age 46) Shpakovskoye, Stavropol Krai, Russian SFSR, Soviet Union
- Party: United Russia
- Spouse: Aset Movlayevna Daudova
- Children: 10 children
- Parents: Hozhakhmed Abdulvakhabovich Daudov (father); Makka Uvaysovna Daudova (mother)
- Education: Makhachkala Institute of finance and law Academy of the Department of MIA of Russia
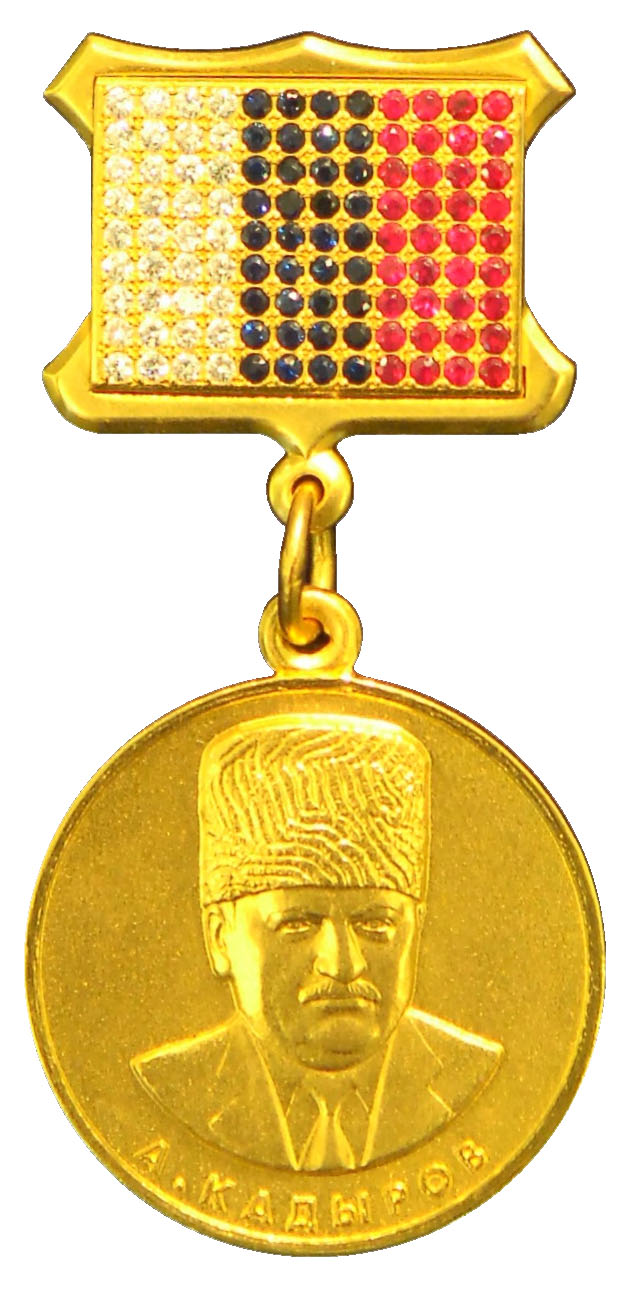
- Awards

Military service
- Allegiance: Chechen Republic of Ichkeria (1999–2001); Russia (since 2001)
- Branch/service: Armed Forces of the Chechen Republic of Ichkeria (1999—2002); Ministry of Internal Affairs (2001—2024); National Guard (since 2024)
- Years of service: 1999–present
- Rank: Lieutenant general (2025)

Magomed Hozhakhmedovich Daudov (Russian: Магомед Хожахмедович Даудов; Chechen: Дауди Хожахьмадан Мохьмад, romanized: Daudi Xoƶaẋmadan Moẋmad, nicknamed Lord, born 26 February 1980) is a Russian statesman, politician and military commander, who is currently serving as the prime minister of the Chechen Republic since May 2024.

Before his premiership, he was put as the Chairman of the Parliament from 2016 to 2024, First Deputy Chairman of the Chechen Government from 2010 until 2012, manager of administration of the Head and Government of the Chechen Republic from 2011 until 2015.

Daudov participated in both the First and Second Chechen Wars. During the latter, he switched sides to the side of the Russian government. He worked in the security service of Akhmad Kadyrov (2002–2004), commanded a police force battalion of the Ministry of Internal Affairs (2004–2005), was Chief of Staff for Republican OMON (2006–2007), and Chief of the Shalinsky District Department of Internal Affairs (2007–2010).

Journalists have called Daudov the second-most influential person in the Chechen Republic after Kadyrov and often carries out "special orders" of the Head of the Chechen Republic. He is a police colonel and a member of the Presidium of the regional political council for the party United Russia. He was awarded the Order of Courage twice (2005, 2006), the Order of Kadyrov (2006), the rank of "Honorary Citizen of the Chechen Republic" (2007) and Hero of the Russian Federation (2007).

== Early life ==
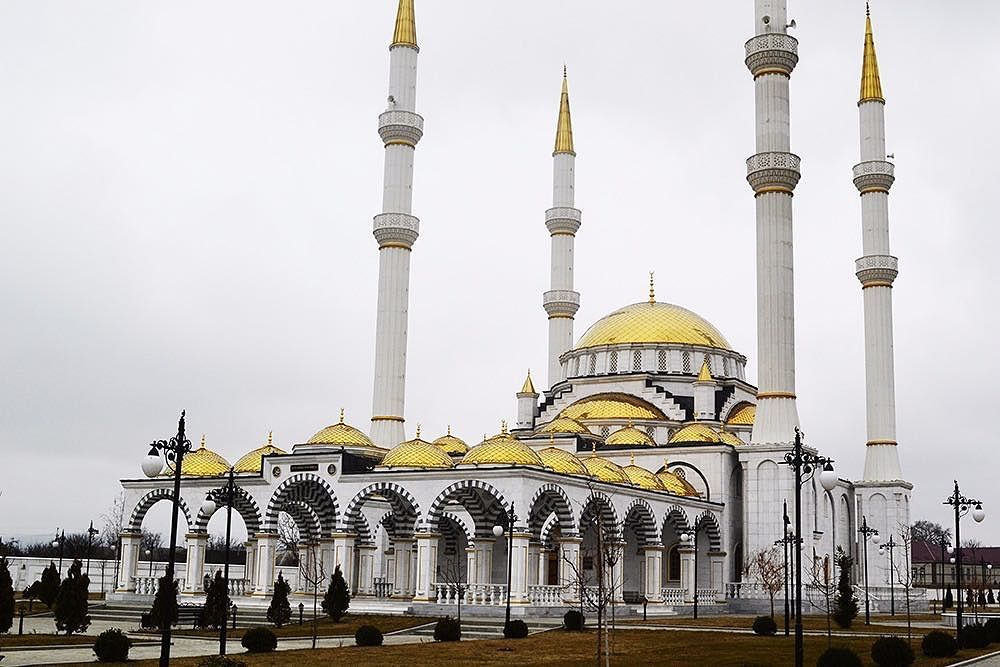
Mosque in Geldagan named after Makka Daudova

Daudov was born on 26 February 1980 in the village Shpakovskoe, Stavropolsky Region to Hozhakhmed Abdulvakhabovich Daudov and Makka Uvaysovna Daudova. His father was from the village of Geldagan in Kurchaloyevsky District. Daudov was the family's first child. His brother Sheykhmagomed was born in 1981 and his sister Milana was born in 1985.

=== Education ===
In 1997 he left Secondary School No. 1 in the village of Geldagan. Class teacher H.M. Abdurzakova recollects: "Magomed was intellectually inquisitive and gifted for his years as a boy. Despite his young age, he was very persistent and dedicated." From 1997 to 1999, he studied at the Gudermes Pedagogical Training School.

=== Participation in the military conflict ===
At the beginning of the First Chechen War, Daudov was 14. As with many other young Chechens, he was involved in armed conflicts with Russian troops. In an interview in 2010, Daudov stated his point of view about the reasons why Chechens were forced to participate in the war. One reason he called "tough cleaning of federal troops" — the Russian military saw the potential enemy in any young local resident. Some sources report that until 2002 he was in the ranks of illegal armed formations while, others claim that in 2000 he joined the forces of the Russian Federation and served there until 2002.

According to official sources, at the beginning of the Second Chechen War Daudov sided with the Kadyrov-led government forces.

Daudov recollects "when Akhmad-Hadji announced the amnesty, I hid at my aunt's. There was no blood on me and I came out of the wood at once, as did thousands of other guys. After a conversation with R.A. Kadyrov, I was amnestied."

During one of his speeches, Kadyrov spoke of Daudov as a positive example of an improved fighter. In 2002–2004, Daudov served as commander of a platoon in Kadyrov's security service.

== Military career ==
In June 2004, Daudov began to serve as commander of Troop Regiment No. 2 of a special purpose unit at the Ministry of Internal Affairs. In February 2005, he became the commander of a battalion of the security guard and patrol service of police for the Department of Internal Affairs across the Shalinsky district. In November 2006, he became a special investigative agent in the fight against kidnapping and human trafficking. Daudov organized special operations against groups of separatists and bands.

On 13 February 2006 he was involved in a special operation in Urus-Martan, where he killed the "emir of the village of Avtur," D. Abdurzakov. When Abdurzakov responded to the offer "hand over" with automatic fire, Daudov reportedly broke into a house and killed the fighter. In September 2006 he supervised and headed another special operation — the liquidation of the Muskiyev brothers. One brother, Isa, was considered to be a leader of armed separatist groups acting in the Argun, Shalinsky and Kurchaloyevsky districts.

In December 2006, Daudov was appointed deputy commander and chief of OMON staff of the Ministry of Internal Affairs. He personally participated in many fighting actions. Under his leadership OMON eliminated 46 notable criminals, blocked out 84 people and seized firearms, improvised explosive devices, electric detonators, artillery shells and mortar mines.

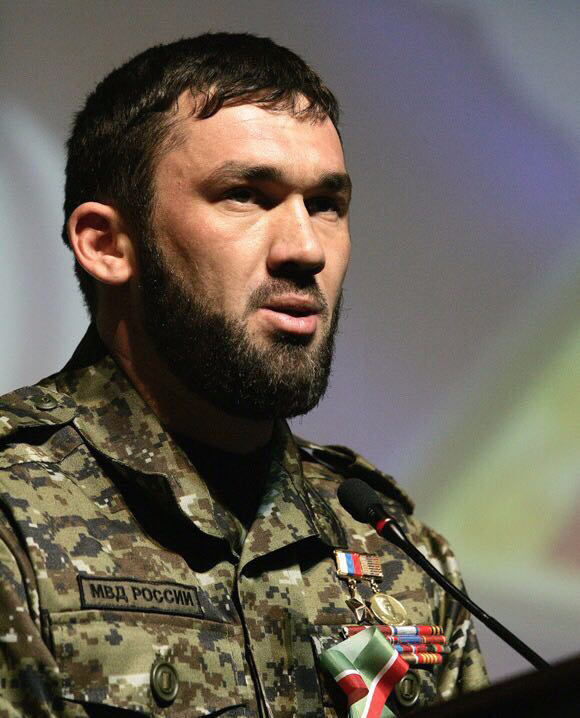
Daudov in uniform of the police colonel.

In April 2007, Daudov became the acting chief of the District Department of Internal Affairs (ROVD) in Shalinsky district and in September he officially became the chief. On 21 March 2007, Daudov organized liquidation of the brigade general in Gudermes, who commanded the Northeast front of Chechen Republic of Ichkeria.

Daudov killed the vice-premiere, S.E. Elmurzayev, who was responsible for the 9 May 2004 explosion in Grozny that killed Kadyrov, Chairman of the State Council of the Chechen Republic H. Isaev and four others. Daudov received operational information about Elmurzayev's location and organized an operation to eliminate him. On 4 April 2007, Elmurzayev was ambushed and killed by security officers in the village of Agishbatoy.

On 19 March 2009, Daudov was injured during a raid in Samashkinsky Street, Oktyabrsky District, Grozny.

On 3 August 2009, an attempt was made on Daudov's life. As his car left the village of Avtura, and an explosive detonated on the road. He was injured, but survived.

== Political activity ==
Daudov is an active government participant. Journalists call Daudov the "second person" in the Chechen Republic.

=== First Deputy Chairman ===
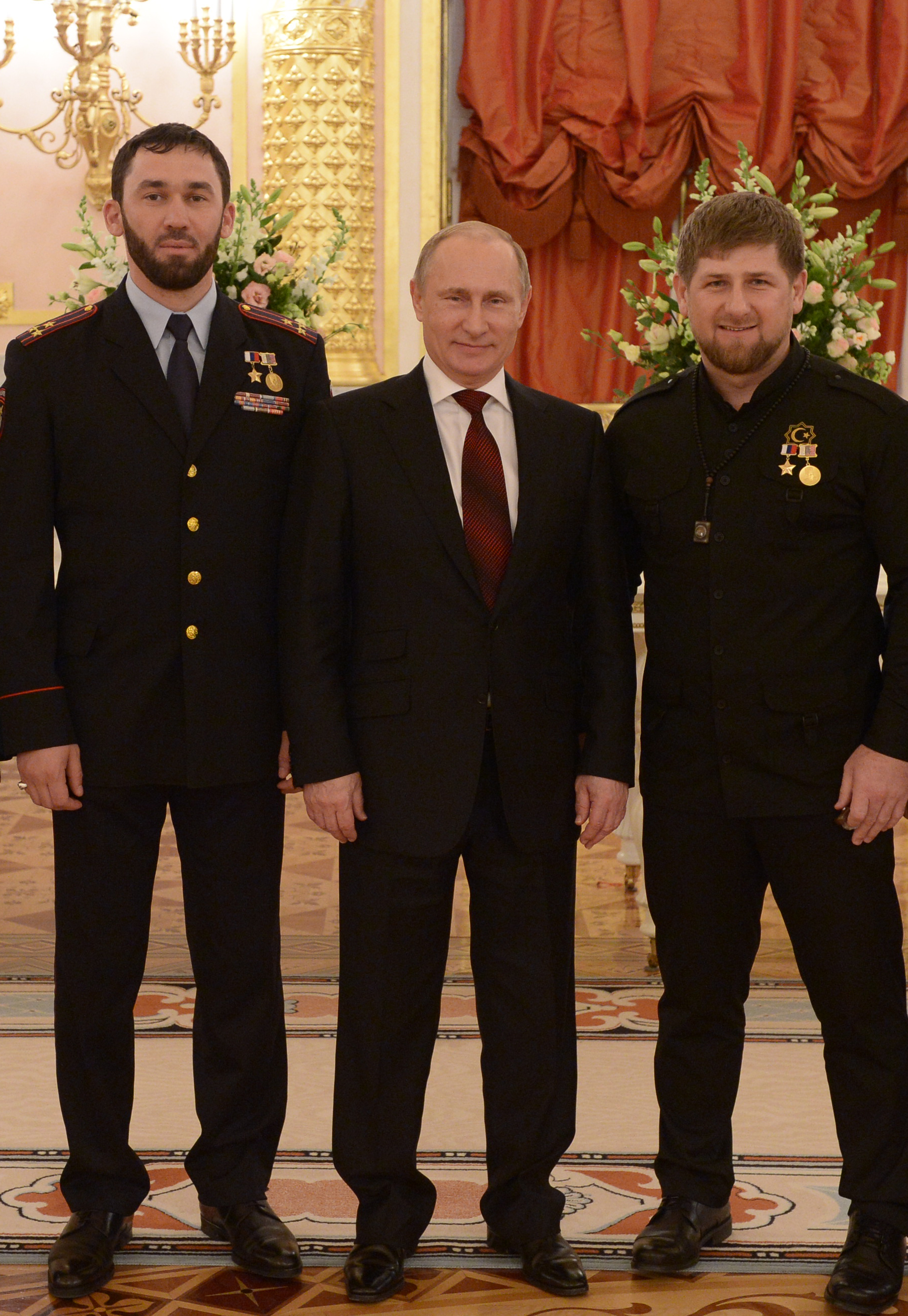
The ceremonial event devoted to celebration of the Heroes of the country. Daudov, Vladimir Putin, Ramzan Kadyrov (Moscow, Kremlin 2014)

On 10 March 2010, the Parliament of the Chechen Republic unanimously approved Daudov as First Deputy Chairman. In this position, he led commissions for issues in the republic including an interdepartmental commission on issues of Records and Registration of citizens in 2010. In November 2010, he led the reconstruction and development of Argun. In December 2011, Daudov led the special commission for organization of celebration of Ashura.

In 2011, Daudov graduated from the Federal State Educational Institution of Higher Professional Education MVD Administration Academy of Russia with a specialization in Jurisprudence.

=== First Assistant ===
In December 2011, Daudov's position was changed to "The first Assistant of the Chairman of Government of the Chechen Republic — the Manager of Administration of the Head and the Government of the Chechen Republic", and on 21 May 2012 to "The Manager of Administration of the Head and the Government of the Chechen Republic". On 26 April 2012, Daudov became a member of the United Russia Party and a member of the Presidium of the Regional political Council of the Party. Later in 2012 he led the republican interdepartmental commission for control of observance of land legislation. In 2014, United Russia recognized his work as the best among Russian subjects.

=== Chairman of the Parliament ===
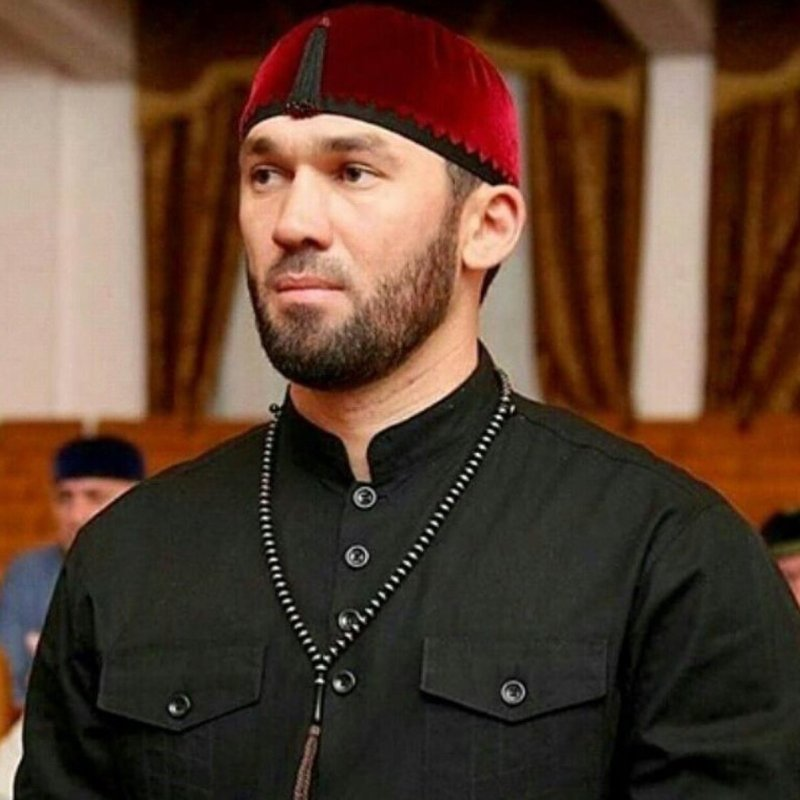
Daudov at intersessional meeting of the Parliament of the Chechen Republic on 3 July 2015.

On 3 July 2015, after the death of D. B. Abdurakhmano, the Speaker of the Parliament, Daudov was presented by the regional department of United Russia as a candidate for Chairman of the Parliament of the Chechen Republic of the III Convention. He was elected by secret vote. On 4 October 2016, he was elected Chairman of the Parliament of the Chechen Republic of the IV convention.

Under his leadership Parliament adopted laws concerning elections of the Head of the Chechen Republic, Development of a Small and Medium Entrepreneurship, Education, social service, mortgage housing lending, public order and others. In October 2016 he implemented a ban on the selling of alcoholic drinks in the republic.

Daudov is a member of the Council of Legislators of the Russian Federation at the Federal Assembly of the Russian Federation.

On 15 May 2024, Daudov resigned from his position as chairman.

=== Non-parliamentary activity ===
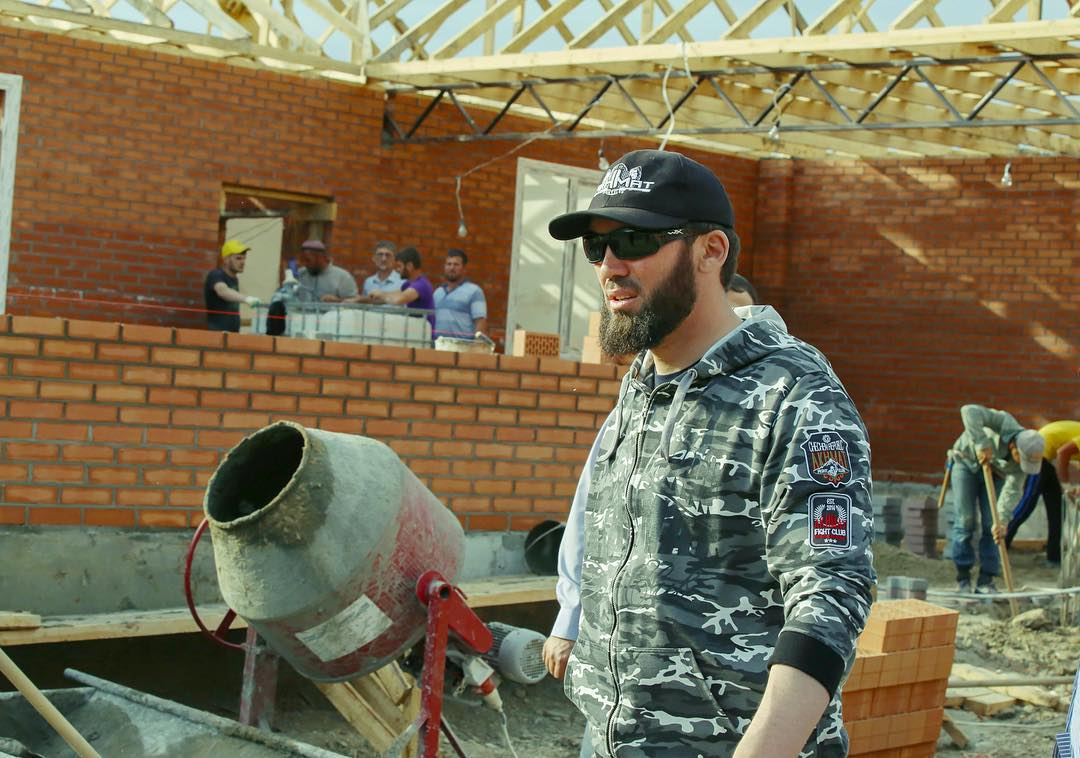
Daudov at a construction in the settlement Gush-Kert.

In 2016, Daudov supervised construction of the settlement Gush-Kert in Shatoysky District, which was destroyed by landslides. Since September 2016, he has directed the republican operational headquarters seeking to decrease the vehicle crash and death rates.

=== Prime minister ===
On 21 May 2024, Prime Minister of Chechnya Muslim Khuchiev announced his resignation and Isa Tumkhadzhiev was appointed as the Acting Prime Minister. On 24 May, President Ramzan Kadyrov proposed Daudov's candidacy to the position and Daudov was prematurely Kadyrov suggested the name of Daudov for the position of Prime Minister. Daudov was approved by the Chechen Parliament on the next day.

== Socio-political views ==
In 2010, Daudov was interviewed by TV reporter Pavel Sheremet. He said, "All of us are citizens of Russia and we want to live in a strong and peaceful state… We stand for the law, for strong and United Russia. Now we have more order and it is more peaceful in Chechnya than in many other Russian regions".

In 2015, various articles discussed comments of Daudov concerning the legalization of polygamy. Daudov had stated his opinion with reference to a scandal concerning N. Guchigov's and H. L. Goylabiyeva wedding, which he attended. Daudov said that polygamy is practiced so it would be a good idea to settle such cases, preferably on the basis of Sharia, but emphasized that he would not take initiative to legalize polygamy.

According to French news magazine Marianne, Magomed Daudov glorified the murderer of the French teacher Samuel Paty. On September 22, 2021, he affirmed, in a video broadcast live on his Instagram account, that the assassin of Samuel Paty, Abdoullakh Anzorov was a "young person, killed because he opposed the caricature of the Prophet" and "that he died in jihad".

== Criticisms ==
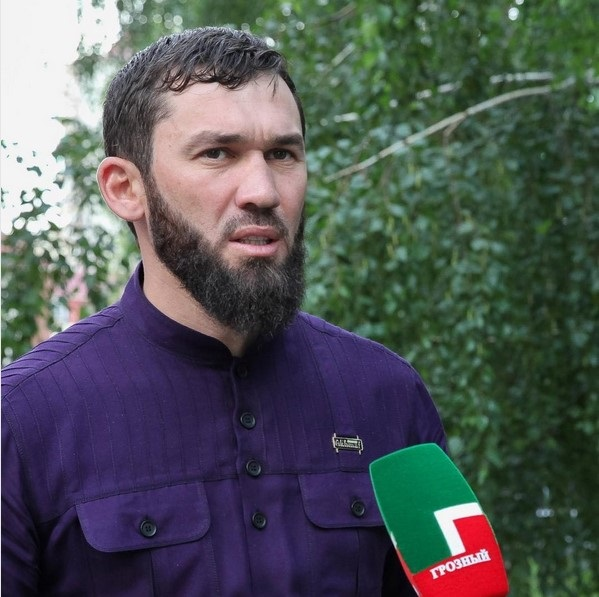
Daudov gives an interview to local television ChGTRK "Grozny".

According to investigations by Novaya Gazeta and human rights organization Human Rights Watch, as a person in the inner circle of Kadyrov, Daudov often carries out his "special instructions".

In 2014, according to a Novaya Gazeta investigation, Daudov participated in the torture and beating of detained president of Assembly of the Caucasian people, R. Kutayev.

In 2015, Novaya Gazeta reported that Chechen authorities were concerned about "true news" about the republic, claiming that bloggers writing about Chechnya in a manner viewed as "incorrect" by the authorities were illegally pressured and forced to apologise. Daudov was mentioned in this context.

On 16 and 17 January 2016, Daudov made posts on his Instagram account that contained insults and veiled threats against members of the Russian opposition, including journalists and right activists (Alexei Venediktov, I.A. Kalyapin, K.E. Merzlikin, A.A. Navalny, L.A. Ponomaryov, M.B. Khodorkovsky, V.I. Shenderovich and I.V. Yashin. Editor-in-chief of Echo of Moscow A.A. Venediktov said: "Magomed Daudov's statements addressing to opposition - is a serious threat and inadequate reaction to inconvenient issues of murder of Boris Nemtsov and a question to investigation and Chechen authorities".

In a 12 October 2016 Instagram post, Daudov again made veiled insults against I.A. Kalyapin, chairman of interregional public organization Committee Against Torture. Gregory Shvedov, editor-in-chief of Online newspaper Caucasian Knot submitted an application to the Investigative Committee of Russia, trying to bring Daudov's publication under corpus delicti under article 144, part 3 of the Criminal Code of Russia. The Investigative Committee of Russia investigated but chose not to open a criminal case against Daudov.

Press articles covered Daudov's conflict with the acting Chairman of the Supreme Court of Chechnya T.A. Murdalov.

According to some journalists, on 6 October 2016, Daudov came to the Supreme Court of Chechnya accompanied by security, entered the office of acting Chairman T. A. Murdalov and began to beat him, demanding that he write the resignation letter for health reasons. Murdalov refused.

According to media and human rights activists, Daudov participated in the prosecution of homosexuals in Chechnya and "played the key role in cleaning of the republic from gays, which was approved by republican management". Journalists provided evidence that Daudov personally went to secret prisons in Argun and Grozny and managed the transfer of detained gays to relatives.

== Personal life ==
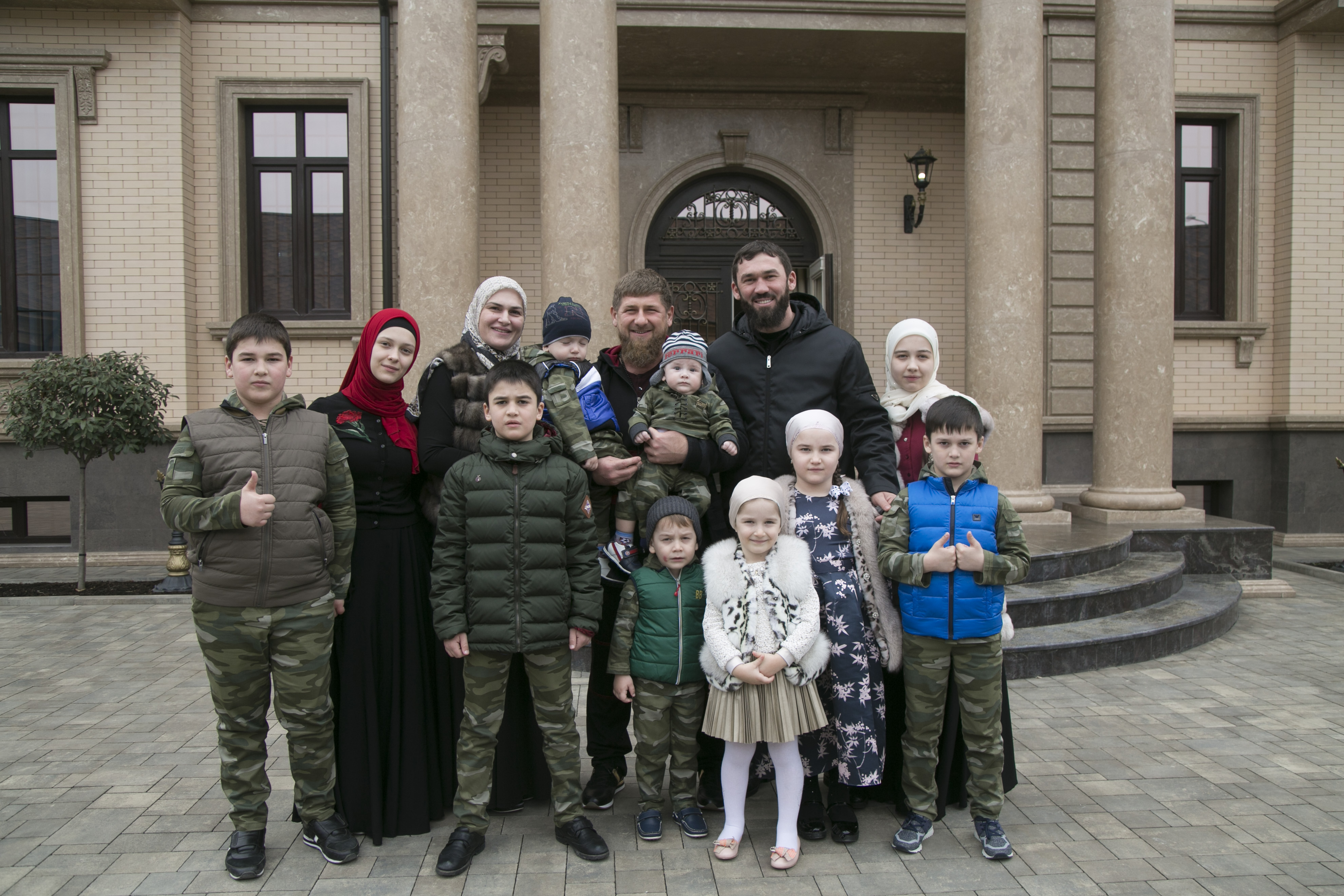
Ramzan Kadyrov with Daudov's family

In 2001, Daudov married a fellow villager from Geldagen and former classmate, Aset Movlayevna. They have ten children, six boys and four girls.

== Awards and honors ==
Daudov received multiple decorations of the Russian Federation and the Chechen Republic.

- Hero of the Russian Federation, 25 July 2007, for courage and heroism in the line of duty as captain of police
- Hero of the Luhansk People's Republic, September 2022
- Gold Star Medal of Hero of Russia. Multiple sources claim that he received this medal for elimination of Deputy Prime Minister S.E. Elmurzayev.

=== State decoration ===
| Russian Federation | | Chechen Republic | |
|---|---|---|---|
| 20.07.2007 | — Rank Hero of the Russian Federation, medal "Gold Star" | 31.05.2006 | — Order of Kadyrov |
| 25.07.2005 | — Order of Courage | 28.06.2011 | — Order "For growth of parliamentarism in Chechen Republic" |
| 04.04.2006 | — Order of Courage | 26.11.2015 | — Medal for Merit before Chechen Republic |
| | — Medal for Bravery | 16.06.2016 | — Guardian Medal of Chechen Republic |
| | — Medal of Zhukov | 26.07.2007 | — Title "Honorary citizen of Chechen Republic" |
| | | 01.07.2016 | — Title "Honored builder of Chechen Republic" |
| | | 11.08.2017 | — Title "Honorary Citizen of Grozny" |

=== Departmental and commemorative medals ===
| 2003 | — Medal "85 years to Criminal investigation department" |
| 24.11.2004 | — Medal "100 years to trade unions of Russia" |
| 10.02.2005 | — Medal "For Brotherhood in Arms" |
| 12.05.2005 | — Medal "For bravery in service" |
| 10.10.2005 | — Medal "Combatant in the north Caucasus 1994—2004" |
| 17.07.2006 | — Medal "For military bravery" |
| 2010 | — Medal "Medal for Merit in Service" III Class ( Interior Ministry of Russia) |
| 05.11.2010 | — Medal "Medal for Merit in Service" ( Interior Ministry of Russia across Chechen Republic, No. 3048) |
| 15.06.2011 | — Medal "For service in police" |
| 05.11.2012 | — Medal "60 years of Akhmad-Hadji Kadyrov" |
| 2013 | — Medal "Honor II Class" |
| 06.05.2015 | — Medal "70 years Victory in The Great Patriotic War 1941—1945" |
| 23.08.2015 | — Medal "For merit" |
| 28.08.2015 | — Medal "Loyalty to fatherland" |
| 08.10.2015 | — Medal "Honor I Class" |
| | — Medal "For service in the North Caucasus" |
| | — Medal «Military brotherhood» |
| 29.07.2016 | — Medal "Honor of Russia" |
| 23.08.2016 | — Medal "For help and assistance to the veteran movement" |
| 21.03.2017 | — Medal "For merits in law enforcement and order" |

=== Badge of achievement ===
| 11.09.2004 | — a badge "Сombatant" |
| 18.09.2004 | — a badge "Fidelity to duty" |
| 16.12.2009 | — a badge "Fidelity to duty" |
| | — a badge "15 years of Fund for Special Operations of Russia in the Chechen Republic" |
| 29.03.2005 | — a badge "The best performer of special forces of police" |
| 20.06.2006 | — a badge "The best performer of special forces of police" |
| 09.12.2012 | — a badge "Honourable Dynamo member" |
| 30.10.2015 | — a badge "For merit in fight against terrorism" (the Ministry of Internal Affairs across ChR, No. 004) |
| 20.06.2017 | — a badge "For merit" (Head department of military police of MD RF, No. 78) |

=== Awards of foreign countries ===
Kazakhstan:
| 04.11.2008 | — Medal «For development of cooperation» |

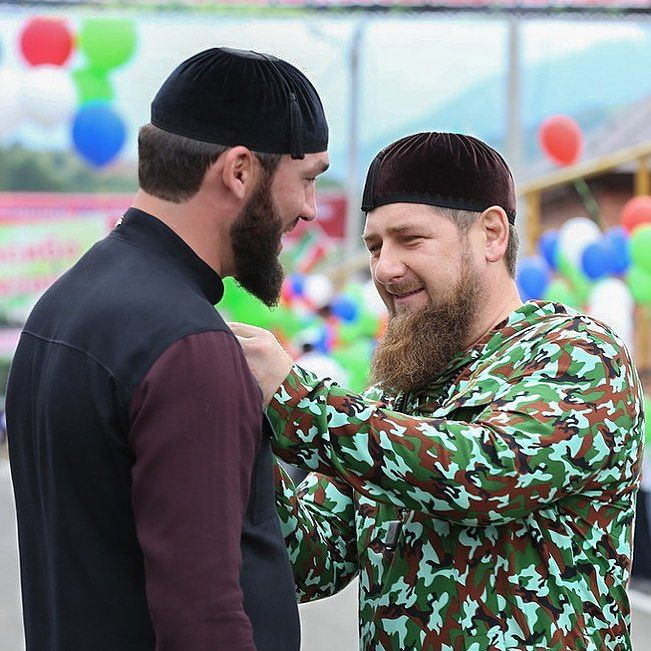
Receiving honorary title "Honored builder of the Chechen Republic".

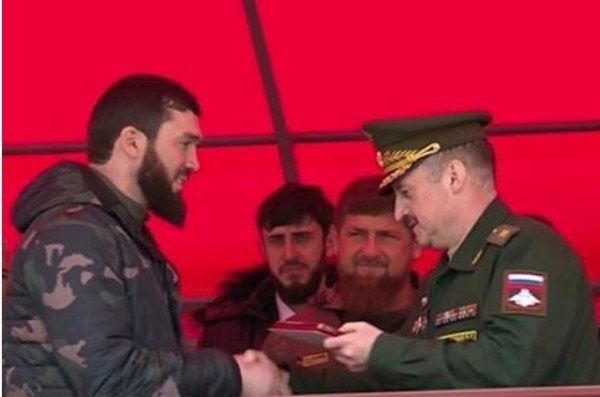
Receiving the highest award of military police of the Russian Federation.

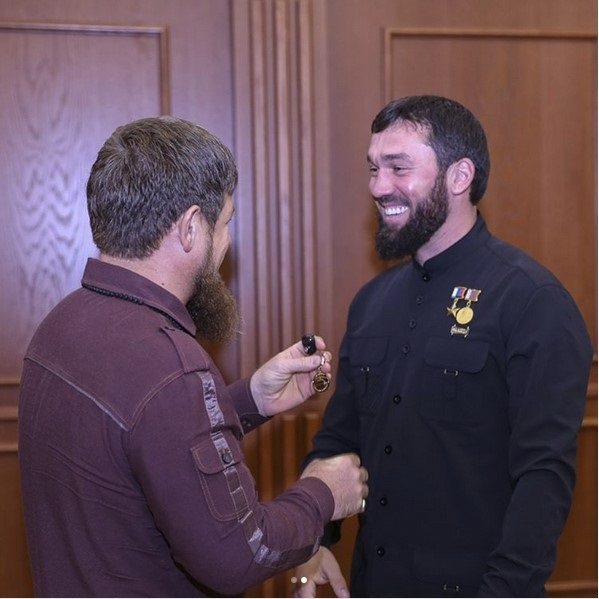
Receiving "Defender of the Chechen Republic".

=== Street and school ===
On 13 October 2007, by order of the head of administration of the village Geldagan, Titov Street was renamed into the Street of Hero of Russia M.H. Daudov. In March 2008 by Chechen Republic Presidential decree the secondary high school No. 1 of the village Geldagan, where Daudov studied, was named in his honor.

== See also ==
- List of Heroes of the Russian Federation
