= Muslim Khuchiev =

Russian politician

- Муслим Хучиев
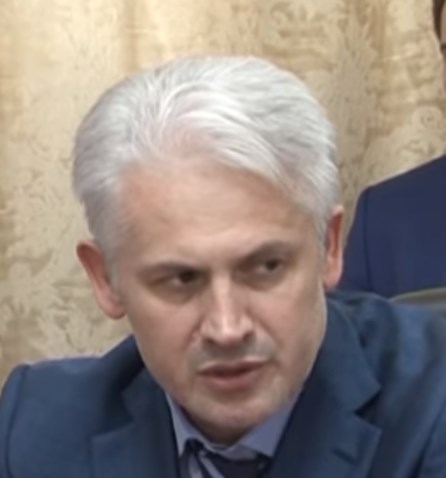
- Khuchiev in 2015

Aide to the Prime Minister of Russia
- Incumbent
- Assumed office 24 May 2024
- Prime Minister: Mikhail Mishustin

Prime Minister of the Chechen Republic
- In office 25 June 2018 – 21 May 2024
- Head: Ramzan Kadyrov
- Preceded by: Ruslan Edelgeriev
- Succeeded by: Isa Tumkhadzhiev (Acting); Magomed Daudov

Mayor of Grozny
- In office 11 August 2015 – 25 June 2018; Acting: 8 June – 11 August 2015
- Head: Ramzan Kadyrov
- Preceded by: Islam Kadyrov
- Succeeded by: Ibragim Zakriev
- In office 1 January 2010 – 8 October 2012
- Preceded by: Office established, himself as Head of the Grozny Administration
- Succeeded by: Ibragim Zakriev

Head of the Grozny Administration
- In office 7 March 2007 – 1 January 2010
- Head: Ramzan Kadyrov
- Preceded by: Movsar Temirbayev
- Succeeded by: Office disestablished, himself as Mayor of Grozny

Personal details
- Born: 5 August 1971 (age 54) Zakan-Yurt, Checheno-Ingush Autonomous Soviet Socialist Republic, Soviet Union

Muslim Magomedovich Khuchiev (Russian: Муслим Магомедович Хучиев; born 5 August 1971) is a Russian politician, who served as the Prime Minister of the Chechen Republic from June 2018 until his resignation in May 2024.

Khuchiev acted as Head of the Chechen Republic from 11 to 16 February 2019 and from 13 to 21 January 2020.

== Biography ==
Khuchiev was born 5 August 1971 in Zakan-Yurt, Checheno-Ingush Autonomous Soviet Socialist Republic.

=== Education ===
Between 1988 and 1991, Khuchiev studied at the Chechen State University in Grozny. In 1991, he transferred to the Faculty of Journalism, Lomonosov Moscow State University, graduating in 1994 with a degree in journalism.

In 2009, Khuchiev graduated from the Russian Academy of Public Administration with a degree in public and municipal administration.

In 2018, Khuchiev graduated from the Russian Presidential Academy of National Economy and Public Administration with a master's degree in economics.

=== Journalism and commerce ===
Khuchiev first worked as a journalist in Moscow between 1995 and 1997, as a correspondent for the Screen of Criminal Reports programme of the Russian Television and Radio Broadcasting Network.

From May 1998 to June 2004, he was an advertising manager at a manufacturing enterprise called Sokol RS LLC (Moscow).

=== State service ===
From July 2004 to December 2005, Khuchiev served as Head of the Press Service of the President of the Chechen Republic, before becoming First Deputy Chief of Staff to the President of Chechnya in March 2006.

From 7 March 2007 to 1 January 2010, Khuchiev served as Head of the Administration of Grozny, the Chechen capital, before serving as the city's mayor from 1 January 2010 to 8 October 2012. Khuchiev served as the mayor of Grozny again from 11 August 2015 to 25 June 2018.

Since 25 June 2018, Khuchiev has served as Chairman of the Government of the Chechen Republic – the Prime Minister of the Chechen Republic.

Khuchiev has acted as Head of the Chechen Republic twice, from 11 to 16 February 2019 and from 13 to 21 January 2020, during the absences of Ramzan Kadyrov.

On 21 May 2024, Khuchiev resigned from his post of Prime Minister, according to Ramzan Kadyrov, due to being appointed elsewhere. His acting successor is another Chechen Minister, Isa Tumkhadzhiev.
