= Khas-Magomed Kadyrov =

Mayor of Grozny

- Хас-Магомед Кадыров
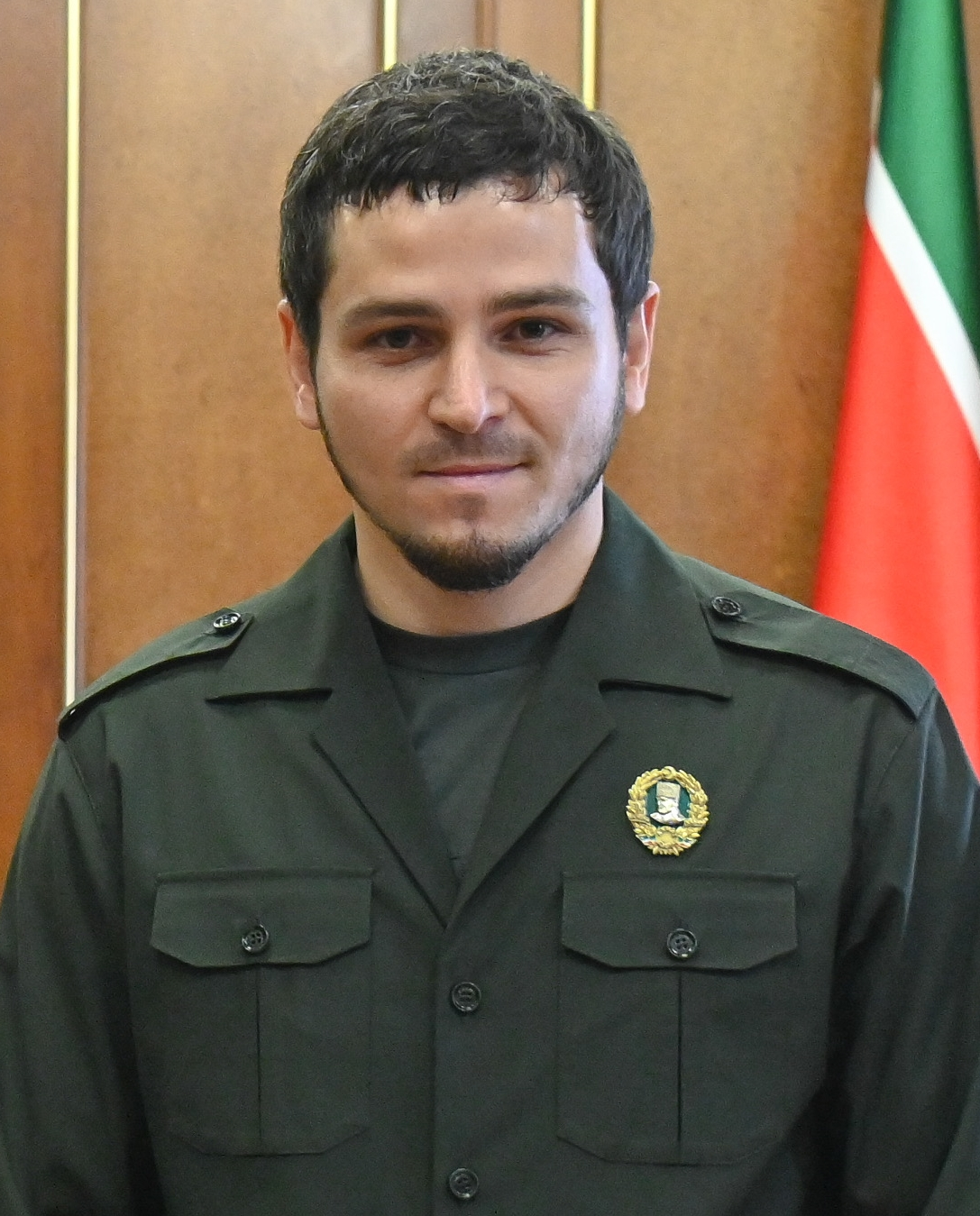

Mayor of Grozny
- Incumbent
- Assumed office 2 March 2021
- Preceded by: Isa Khadzhimuradov

Mayor of Argun (acting)
- In office 2019 – 2 March 2021

Personal details
- Born: Khas-Magomed Shakhmometovich Kadyrov; 12 January 1991 (age 35) Grozny, Soviet Union
- Party: United Russia
- Children: 2

Khas-Magomed Shakhmometovich Kadyrov (Russian: Хас-Магомед Шахмомедович Кадыров; born 12 January 1991), is a Russian politician of Chechen origin, who is the mayor of Grozny since 31 March 2021.

He had been the mayor of Argun from 2019 to 2021.

He is a relative of Ramzan Kadyrov, the Chechen Republic head.

== Biography ==
Khas-Magomed Kadyrov was born on 12 January 1991 in Grozny. He is the namesake of the head of Chechnya, Ramzan Kadyrov, and according to a number of media reports, he is in a relatively close relationship with him. According to the site "Kavkaz. Realii”, Khas-Magomed is Ramzan's fourth cousin, but according to BBC, he is his second cousin. The head of the republic himself, Ramzan, on social networks calls him a younger brother. Khas-Magomed's father, Shakhmomed, is the owner and general director of the largest shopping center in Berkat, in Chechnya.

Kadyrov quickly made a career in the civil service. In 2012, when he was only 21 years old, he became an assistant to the mayor of Grozny, in 2015 he was appointed assistant to the head of the administration of the head and government of Chechnya, and in 2017 he was appointed head of the department of the Ministry of Internal Affairs for the city of Grozny. At that time, Kadyrov was just a junior lieutenant of the Russian police. The head of Chechnya presented him as "an energetic and hardworking leader", who "in his previous positions ... has proven himself only from an excellent side". (in particular, according to him, the new head of the Ministry of Internal Affairs led the operation to rescue two Russian children in Syria), as "hard-working, energetic dear brother".

In 2019, Kadyrov became the mayor of the city of Argun. On 2 March 2021, on the recommendation of the head of Chechnya, he was appointed interim mayor of the Grozny (Formally, he was nominated by Magomed Daudov) Already on 31 March, Kadyrov was officially appointed mayor. He took part in the 2021 United Russia primaries, but took only sixth place.

== Personal life ==
In 2014, Kadyrov graduated from the Faculty of Law of the Chechen University, in 2017 he entered the correspondence department of the Faculty of Economics of the same university.

Kadyrov is married, and has two children.
