= 123rd Separate Guards Motor Rifle Brigade =

123rd Guards Motor Rifle Brigade named after the Hero of the Soviet Union Kliment Voroshilov (2023–present) 2nd Guards Motor Rifle Brigade named after the Hero of the Soviet Union Kliment Voroshilov (2014–2023)
- 123-я гвардейская мотострелковая бригада имени Героя Советского Союза Климента Ворошилова
- Unit patch sleeve
- Active: 1 November 2014 – present
- Allegiance: Luhansk People's Republic (2014–2022); Russia (2022–present)
- Branch: LPR People's Militia (2014–2022); Russian Ground Forces (2022–present)
- Role: Motorized infantry
- Part of: 3rd Guards Combined Arms Army
- Garrison/HQ: Luhansk
- Patron: Kliment Voroshilov
- Engagements: Russo-Ukrainian War; War in Donbas; Battle of Debaltseve; Invasion of Ukraine; Battle of Rubizhne; Battle of Sievierodonetsk; Battle of Lysychansk
- Decorations: Guards

Insignia
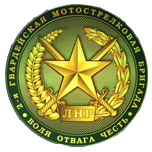
- Former insignia

The 123rd Guards Motor Rifle Brigade named after the Hero of the Soviet Union Kliment Voroshilov (Russian: 123-я гвардейская мотострелковая бригада имени Героя Советского Союза Климента Ворошилова, 123 oмсбр; MUN 73438) is a military unit of Russian Ground Forces. Until January 1, 2023, it was part of the Luhansk People's Militia. It is attached to the 3rd Guards Combined Arms Army.

== History ==
=== War in Donbas ===
The unit was first formed as the 2nd Motor Rifle Brigade on November 1, 2014. It was based on three early LPR battalions: "Zarya", which became the 1st Motor Rifle Battalion; "Don", which became the 2nd Motor Rifle Battalion; and "Hooligan", which became the 3rd.

Emblem of the Zarya battalion

"Zarya" ("Dawn") was originally formed in early 2014 as the 1st LNOB (Luhansk People's Liberation Battalion/Луганский Народно-освободительный батальон), part of the "Army of the South-East". It had been founded by Igor Plotnitsky, who later became the leader of the LPR, and as such, remained one of the LPR's most important battalions.

By mid-2015, the strength of the LPR 2nd Motor Rifle Brigade was thought to be around 4,500 personnel. Ukrainian analysts considered the LPR 2nd Motor Rifle Brigade to be one of the most powerful units in the DPR and LPR, partly because it consistently had the highest staffing level compared to other units.

On November 1, 2015, Plotnitsky awarded the brigade the "Guards" status, and on September 5, 2016, he named the brigade after the Hero of the Soviet Union Marshal Kliment Voroshilov.

=== Russian invasion of Ukraine ===
The brigade took part in battles of Rubizhne, Sievierodonetsk and Lysychansk.

In January 2023, after the 2nd Army Corps was incorporated into the Russian Armed Forces, the brigade was renamed the 123rd Separate Guards Motor Rifle Brigade.

On July 17, 2023, brigade commander Denis "Tashkent" Ivanov was killed by a Ukrainian FPV drone.

== Structure ==
- 1st Motor Rifle Battalion "Zarya"
- 2nd Motor Rifle Battalion "Don"
- 3rd Motor Rifle Battalion "Hooligan"
- Tank battalion
- Self-propelled artillery battalion
- Towed artillery battalion
- Rocket artillery battalion
