= Dukuvakha Abdurakhmanov =

Russian politician

- Дукуваха Абдурахманов
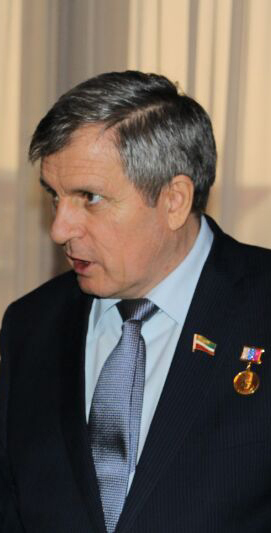
- Abdurakhmanov in June 2015

Chairman of Parliament of the Chechen Republic
- In office 30 October 2008 – 29 June 2015
- Preceded by: Position renamed
- Succeeded by: Magomed Daudov

Chairman of the People's Assembly of the Chechen Republic
- In office 12 December 2005 – 30 October 2008
- Preceded by: Taus Dzhabrailov
- Succeeded by: Position renamed

Personal details
- Born: Dukuvakha Bashtayevich Abdurakhmanov; 14 March 1956 Karaganda, Kazakh SSR, Soviet Union
- Died: 29 June 2015 (aged 59) Grozny, Chechen Republic, Russia
- Resting place: Dzhalka
- Party: United Russia
- Education: Chechen State University

Dukuvakha Bashtayevich Abdurakhmanov (Russian: Дукуваха Баштаевич Абдурахманов; March 14, 1956 — June 29, 2015) was a Russian politician of Chechen descent. He was Chairman of the Parliament of the Chechen Republic from 2005 to 2015.

== Biography ==
He was born in Karaganda. In 1974, he graduated from secondary school in the village of Dzhalka, Gudermes District. He graduated from the Chechen-Ingush State University with a degree in history teaching, as well as from the Chechen-Ingush Pedagogical Institute. He served in the Soviet Army in Mongolia. He worked as head of the Dzhalka village council, the Gudermes city executive committee, the administration of Gudermes, and as deputy head of the administration of Argun.

Since 2001, he served as Minister of Agriculture of Chechnya and Deputy Prime Minister of the government. In 2005, during local elections to the People’s Assembly, he headed the list of the United Russia party.

On 12 December 2005, he became Chairman of the People’s Assembly (the lower house of parliament) of the Chechen Republic. On 24 January 2006, he was appointed Chairman of the parliamentary commission for tracing abducted and missing citizens of the republic.

On 30 October 2008, he was elected Chairman of the Parliament of the Chechen Republic of the 2nd convocation. On 26 September 2013, he became Chairman of the Parliament of the Chechen Republic of the 3rd convocation.

Between 2008 and 2009, he also served as Chairman of the Union of Writers of the Chechen Republic.

He was married and had two children.

He died on 29 June 2015 after a serious illness. In connection with his death, a three-day mourning period was declared in Chechnya. On 30 June 2015, he was buried in the village of Dzhalka, Gudermes District.

== Awards ==
- Order of Friendship (Russia, 5 September 2002) — for achievements in agriculture and many years of conscientious work.
- Order of Honour (Russia, 8 September 2006) — for a significant contribution to legislative activity and many years of conscientious work.
- Commendation of the President of the Russian Federation (25 June 2008) — for merits in strengthening Russian statehood and developing interethnic relations in the Chechen Republic.
- Order of Friendship (South Ossetia, 20 September 2010) — for a major personal contribution to the development of friendly relations and cooperation between peoples, support of the Ossetian people, and in commemoration of the 20th anniversary of the Republic of South Ossetia.
- Honorary Citizen of the City of Grozny (20 March 2014) — for a major contribution to the revival and development of the Chechen capital.
