= 7th Separate Guards Motor Rifle Brigade =

7th Guards Motor Rifle "Chistyakov" Brigade
- 7-я отдельная гвардейская мотострелковая Чистяковская бригада
- Sleeve patch of the brigade
- Active: 8 November 2014 – present
- Allegiance: Luhansk People's Republic (2014–2022); Russia (2022–present)
- Branch: LPR People's Militia (2014–2022); Russian Ground Forces (2022–present)
- Role: Motorized infantry
- Part of: 3rd Guards Combined Arms Army
- Garrison/HQ: Brianka
- Engagements: Russo-Ukrainian War; War in Donbas; Battle of Debaltseve; Invasion of Ukraine; Battle of Lysychansk
- Decorations: Guards

Insignia
- Great emblem

- Former insignia

The 7th Guards Motor Rifle "Chistyakov" Brigade (Russian: 7-я отдельная гвардейская мотострелковая Чистяковская бригада, 7 oмсбр; MUN 08807) is a military unit of Russian Ground Forces. Until January 1, 2023, it was part of the Luhansk People's Militia. It is attached to the 3rd Guards Combined Arms Army.

== History ==
=== War in Donbas ===
The 7th Separate Guards Motor Rifle "Chistyakov" Brigade was formed in Torez, in Donetsk oblast, from part of the group of militants who had fought under Igor Girkin in Sloviansk and escaped from encirclement there.

For a short period of time in 2015, part of Girkin's Slavyansk Brigade was formed into the DPR 1st Army Corps 7th Slavyansk Motor Rifle Brigade. This brigade had at least one Motor rifle battalion. At an unknown date in late 2015, the 7th Slavyansk Motor Rifle Brigade was transferred to the LPR 2nd Army Corps, and disappeared from the DPR 1st Army Corps order of battle. Colonel Alexander Bushuev was the brigade's commander since September 2015 until his death on July 3, 2016.

The name "Chistyakov" was given to the brigade after the capture of Debaltseve by combined DPR, LPR and Russian forces, taking the name of a Soviet-era formation which took part in operations in Donbas during the Second World War.

In October 2018, the brigade was awarded the honorary title of "Guards" by the head of the LPR, Leonid Pasechnik.

The brigade is stationed in Brianka.

=== Russian invasion of Ukraine ===
It was reported in late May 2022 that the brigade had taken part in combat at Sievierodonetsk. The brigade also took part in the battle of Lysychansk.

== Structure ==
- 1st Motor Rifle Battalion
- 2nd Motor Rifle Battalion
- 3rd Motor Rifle Battalion
- Tank battalion
- Self-propelled artillery battalion
- Towed artillery battalion
- Rocket artillery battalion
