= Mayor of Grozny =

- Coat of arms of Grozny

- Flag of Grozny

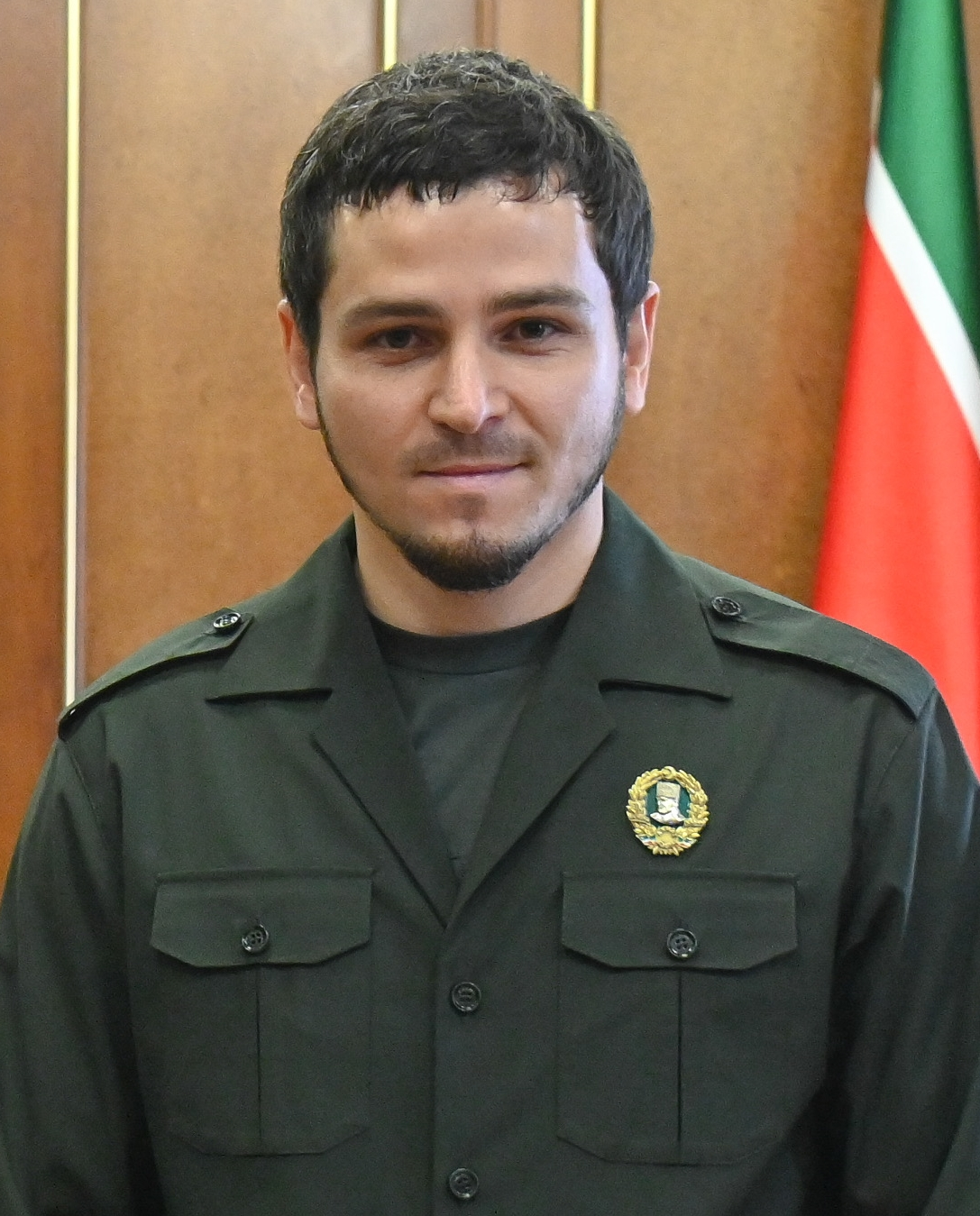
- Incumbent; Khas-Magomed Kadyrov since 2 March 2021
- Style: His Excellency; Mr. Mayor
- Seat: Grozny City Hall
- Appointer: Head of the Chechen Republic
- Term length: At the pleasure of the Head of the Chechen Republic
- Precursor: Commandant of Grozny Fortress
- Inaugural holder: Major von Kuhlman, Fenogin Samoilovich
- Formation: 1850 (historical); 1991 (modern)

The Mayor of Grozny (Chechen: Соьлж-ГӀалин мэр, romanized: Sölƶ-Ġalin mer; Russian: Мэр Грозного, romanized: Mer Groznogo) is the head and the highest-ranking official of Grozny, the capital city of Chechnya, Russia. They lead Grozny City Hall, the main executive body of the city. Its first commandant was Major General Nikolai Grekov, who held this position until 1825. Over time, the fortress lost its military significance and, by decree of the Governing Senate on December 30, 1869, it was renamed the city of Grozny. The current mayor of Grozny is Khas-Magomed Kadyrov.

== Commandants of Grozny Fortress ==
No.	Name	Period
1	Major General Nikolai Grekov	1818–1825
2	Colonel Sorochan, Terentiy Varlamovich	1825–1827
3	Major General Engelhardt V.F.	1827–1830
4	Major General Rosen, Alexander Grigorievich	1830–1834 (1835)
5	Major General Pullo, Alexander Pavlovich	1834 (1835) – 1840
6	Major General Vikenty Antonovich Grzhegorzhevsky	After 1840
7	Major von Kuhlman, Fenogin Samoilovich	1850
8	Major General Aleksandr Baryatinsky	1852

== Mayors ==
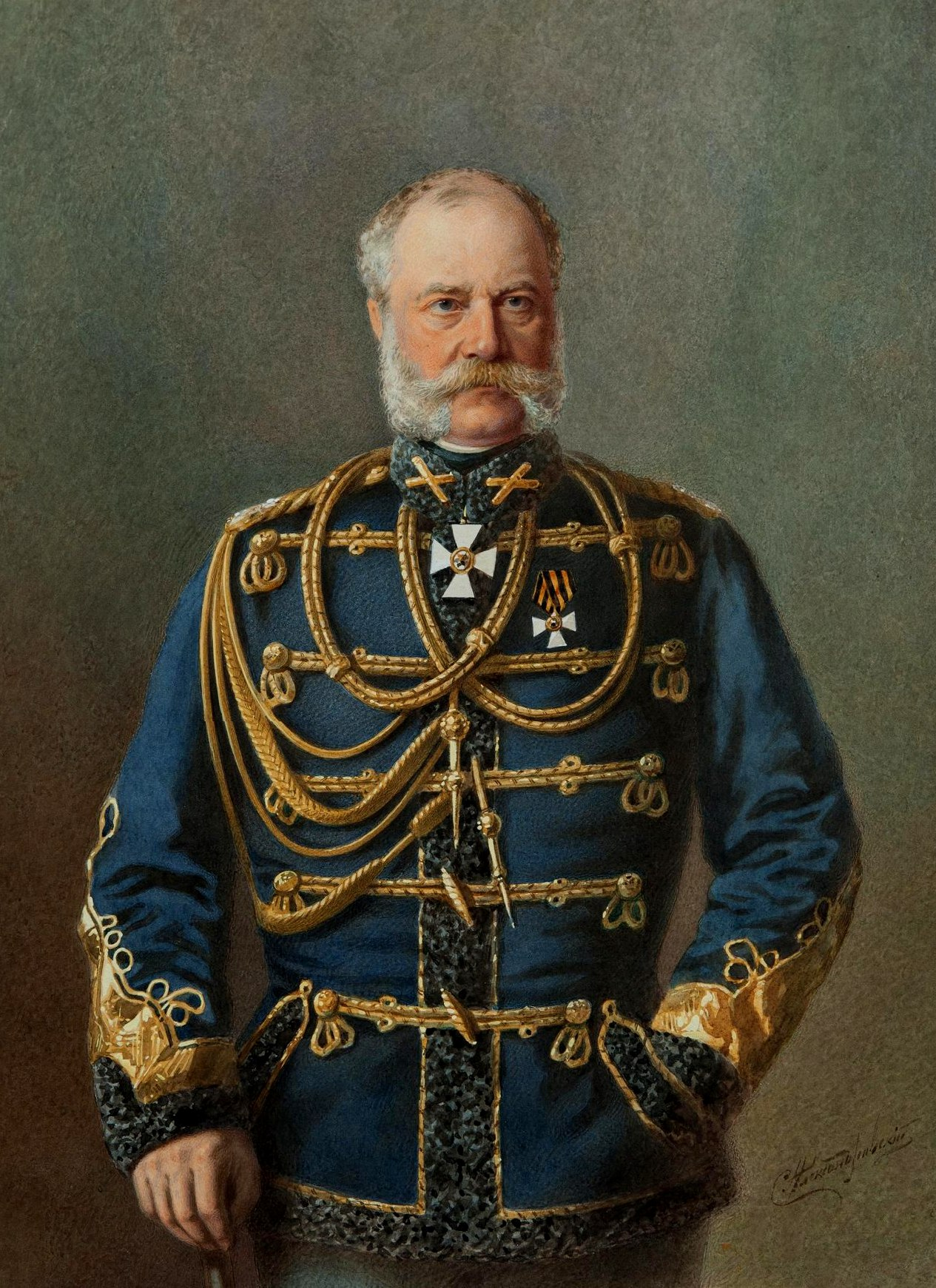
Commandant of the Grozny fortress Aleksandr Baryatinsky.

No.	Name	Period	Job title
1	Major von Kuhlman, Fenogin Samoilovich	1850	Commandant of Grozny Fortress
2	A. Isakovich	1870–1871	Grozny Zaslobsky elder
3	Kulikov, Niktopolion Matveevich	1871–1873	Mayor
4	Kotelnikov I. V.	1874–1877	Mayor
5	Sklyarov V. V.	1878–1880	Mayor
6	Kulikov, Niktopolion Matveevich	1880–1892	Mayor
7	Bellik, Pyotr Gavrilovich	1891–1892	Mayor
8	Loshkarev T. A.	1892–1896	Mayor
9	Dimitriev E. A.	1897	Mayor
10	Loshkarev T. A.	1896–1906	Mayor
11	Kotrov, Pavel Grigorievich	1907–1911	Mayor
12	Khrenov, Pyotr Ivanovich	1911	Mayor
13	Kotrov, Pavel Grigorievich	1911–1912	Mayor
14	Khrenov, Pyotr Ivanovich	1913	Acting Mayor
15	Chernyavsky, Vissarion Petrovich	1913–1915	Mayor
16	Erznikov, Georgy Avetovich	1915–1917	Mayor
17	Exarchopulo A. M.	1916	Mayor
18	Japaridze, Ivan Davydovich	1914–1916	Head of the Grozny District of the Terek Region
19	Agapov F. D.	1917	Chairman of the Council of Workers' and Soldiers' Deputies
20	Ioannisiani, Grigory Zinovievich	1917–1918	Chairman of the Grozny Revolutionary Committee
21	Gikalo, Nikolai Fedorovich	1918–1927	From March 1918 - Chairman of the Central Council of Grozny; from April 1918 - Chairman of the Grozny Council of Workers' and Soldiers' Deputies
22	Chernokozov, Khrisanf Pavlovich	1920	Chairman of the Executive Committee of the Grozny City Council
23	Ivanov	1924	Chairman of the Grozny Provincial Executive Committee
24	Kin, Pavel Andreevich	1924–1925	Chairman of the Executive Committee of the Grozny City Council
25	Butenko, Vasily Stepanovich	1925–1926	Chairman of the Executive Committee of the Grozny City Council
26	Kolbus, Mikhail Ivanovich	1934–1935	Chairman of the Grozny City Council
27	Sytnikov V. G.	1941–1943	Commandant of Grozny
28	Matishev A. G.	1943	Chairman of the Executive Committee of the Grozny City Council of Workers' Deputies
29	Starchak, Ivan Nikolaevich	1944–1949	Chairman of the Executive Committee of the Grozny Regional Council
30	Kovalenko, Georgy Efremovich	1949–1952	Chairman of the Executive Committee of the Grozny Regional Council
31	Evgeniy Bryksin	1952–1960	Chairman of the Grozny City Executive Committee
32	Alexander Pokhvishchev	1960–1967	Chairman of the Grozny City Executive Committee
33	Pyotr Istomin	1967–1973	Chairman of the Grozny City Executive Committee
34	Vladislav Shamardin	1974–1985	Chairman of the Grozny City Executive Committee
35	Vitaly Kutsenko	1985–1991	Chairman of the Grozny City Executive Committee

== Mayors of Grozny since 1991 ==
No.	Mayor	Period of leadership	
1	Mairbek Baymuradov	1991	
2	Bislan Gantamirov	November 1, 1991	April 17, 1993
3	Kyuri Muzaev	1993	1994
4	Bislan Gantamirov	Spring 1995	November 1, 1995
5	Yakub Deniev	November 1, 1995	May 1996
6	Lechi Dudayev	May 1996	January 30, 2000
7	Supyan Makhchaev	February 2000	July 2000
8	Bislan Gantamirov	October 18, 2000	May 17, 2001
9	Oleg Zhidkov	July 21, 2001	June 3, 2003
10	Khozh-Akhmed Arsanov	June 3, 2003	December 17, 2003
11	Movsar Temirbaev	December 17, 2003	March 7, 2007
12	Muslim Khuchiev	March 7, 2007	October 8, 2012
13	Islam Kadyrov	November 9, 2012	July 8, 2015
14	Muslim Khuchiev	August 11, 2015	June 25, 2018
15	Ibragim Zakriev	July 26, 2018	February 10, 2020
16	Isa Khadzhimuradov	March 16, 2020	March 1, 2021
17	Khas-Magomed Kadyrov	March 2, 2021	Present
