= Islam Kadyrov =

Russia's youngest mayor

- Ислам Кадыров

Mayor of Grozny
- In office 9 November 2012 – 8 July 2015
- Preceded by: Muslim Khuchiev
- Succeeded by: Muslim Khuchiev

Mayor of Grozny (acting)
- In office 8 October 2012 – 9 November 2012

First Deputy Mayor of Grozny
- In office January 2012 – 8 October 2012

Personal details
- Born: 18 July 1987 (age 38) Tsentaroy, Russia, Soviet Union
- Party: United Russia

Islam Vakhayevich Kadyrov (Russian: Ислам Вахаевич Кадыров; born on 18 July 1987) is a Russian politician who had served as the mayor of Grozny from 2012 to 2015, and was the youngest mayor in the history of Russia.

In the past, he had served as the Deputy Chairman of the Government of the Chechen Republic, as the Minister of Property and Land Relations of the Chechen Republic, and was the former head of the Administration of the Head and Government of the Chechen Republic.

He is the nephew of Ramzan Kadyrov.

== Biography ==
Islam Kadyrov was born on 18 July 1987 in the village of Tsentaroy, Shalinsky district (now the village of Akhmat-Yurt, Kurchaloyevsky district) of the Chechen-Ingush Autonomous Soviet Socialist Republic. In 2003, he graduated from a local high school, and in 2010 he received a diploma in economics from the Makhachkala Institute of Finance and Law with a degree in Finance and Credit.

From 2006 to 2012, Kadyrov served in the Terek SOBR unit of the internal affairs bodies of the Chechen Republic. On 16 February 2009, at the age of 22, he became an assistant to the head of Chechnya until November 2012. In January 2012, he was appointed the first deputy mayor of the city of Grozny. Since 28 May 2012, he was the Deputy Prime Minister and Minister of Property and Land Relations of Chechnya.

On 8 October 2012, at the age of 25, he was appointed as the acting Mayor of Grozny, and on 9 November, he was officially approved in office, becoming the youngest mayor in the history of Russia.

From 8 July 2015 to 1 November 2016, he became the head of the administration of the head and government of the Chechen Republic.

Since 1 November 2016, Kadyrov became the Deputy Prime Minister of Chechnya.

In April 2017, Kadyrov was removed from all his posts, and for some time was kept under house arrest. He continued to work in law enforcement agencies.

On 25 October 2019, an investigation began against him after the appearance of a scandalous video provided by the journalists of the Grozny TV channel. According to the authors of the plot, the materials were recorded by the personal press service of the former official, and the total timing of the shooting is about eight hours. The footage shows that Kadyrov speaks rudely with local residents detained on suspicion of fraud, beats and humiliates them, uses a stun gun, and also threatens to be falsely accused of financing terrorism.

== Family ==
Kadyrov is married to Ramzan's niece, Medni, and raises four children.
