= 4th Separate Guards Motor Rifle Brigade =

Unit of the Russian Ground Forces

4th Guards Motor Rifle Brigade
- 4-я отдельная гвардейская мотострелковая бригада
- Sleeve patch of the unit
- Active: 2014–present
- Allegiance: Luhansk People's Republic (2014–2022); Russia (2022–present)
- Branch: LPR People's Militia (2014–2022); Russian Ground Forces (2022–present)
- Role: Motorized Brigade
- Part of: 3rd Guards Combined Arms Army
- Garrison/HQ: Alchevsk
- Engagements: Russo-Ukrainian War; War in Donbas; Invasion of Ukraine; Battle of Lysychansk; Battle of Bakhmut; Battle of Chasiv Yar; Battle of Kostiantynivka
- Battle honours: Guards

Commanders
- Current commander: Major General Anton Feliksovich Grunis †

Insignia
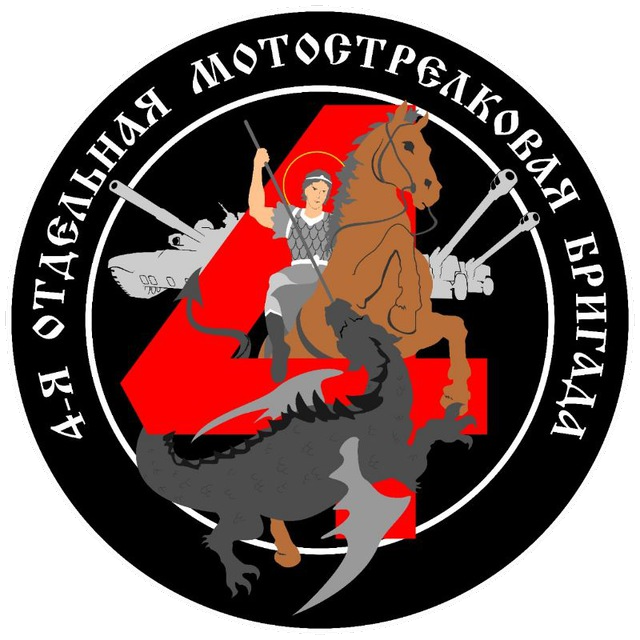
- Unofficial unit insignia

The 4th Guards Motor Rifle Brigade (Russian: 4-я отдельная гвардейская мотострелковая бригада, 4 омсбр; Military Unit Number 74347) is a military unit of the Russian Ground Forces. Until 1 January 2023, it was part of the Luhansk People's Militia. It is attached to the 3rd Guards Combined Arms Army.

== History ==
=== War in Donbas ===
The brigade was formed on 12 December 2014 in Khrustalnyi, Luhansk Oblast. The brigade's garrison was in Alchevsk.

Like most brigades of the 2nd Army Corps, the 4th Brigade lacked a distinct unit symbology, which was only prevalent among various independent battalions. The brigade incorporated the most famous ones, which included:

- 1st Motor Rifle Battalion "Leshiy", originally formed from the residents of Kadiivka led by Alexei Pavlov, who seized the Security Service of Ukraine building in Luhansk on 6 April 2014.
- 2nd Motor Rifle Battalion "Batman", originally formed in April 2014 by Aleksandr Bednov as the "Batman" Rapid Response Group, with the unit name derived from Bednov's nom-de-guerre. He played a crucial role in forming various disparate battalions into the unified 2nd Army Corps and served as the brigade's chief of staff until his death on 1 January 2015.
- 3rd Motor Rifle Battalion "Vityaz". It maintained a very low profile online and was allegedly mostly staffed by members of the Russian 15th Separate Motor Rifle Brigade.

In January 2016, the Prizrak brigade was incorporated into the 4th Motor Rifle Brigade as the 14th Separate Motor Rifle Battalion.

=== Russian invasion of Ukraine ===
In January 2023, the brigade joined the Russian Armed Forces as part of the 2nd Army Corps.

In May 2023, the brigade took part in the battle of Bakhmut, where it replaced the Wagner group in the Klishchiivka sector and suffered heavy casualties, including the brigade's commander Colonel Vyacheslav Makarov. On 10 May 2024, the Institute for the Study of War reported that the brigade is operating near the village of Ivanivske. The brigade is currently involved in the battle of Chasiv Yar.

In late 2024, the Wagner Legion, a unit formed by the former Wagner group commanders, reportedly joined the 4th Brigade as the 1st Motor Rifle Battalion.

On 15 September 2026, commanding officer Major General Anton Feliksovich Grunis was reported to have died.
