= 3rd Guards Combined Arms Army =

Russian Ground Forces formation

3rd Guards Lugansk-Severodonetsk Combined Arms Army (2024–present) 2nd Army Corps (2014–2024)
- 3-я гвардейская Луганско-Северодонецкая общевойсковая армия
- Active: 7 October 2014 – 31 December 2022 (as part of a breakaway state); 31 December 2022 – present (as part of Russia)
- Country: Russia
- Branch: Russian Ground Forces
- Type: Combined arms
- Size: Army
- Part of: Southern Military District
- Garrison/HQ: Lugansk
- Decorations: Guards
- Battle honours: Lugansk-Severodonetsk

Commanders
- Current commander: Lieutenant general Igor Kuzmenkov

Insignia
- Sleeve patch

- Flag

The 3rd Guards Lugansk-Severodonetsk Combined Arms Army (Russian: 3-я гвардейская Луганско-Северодонецкая общевойсковая армия) is a military formation in the Russian Ground Forces as part of the Southern Military District. Formerly the 2nd Army Corps of the Luhansk People's Republic, it was officially incorporated into the Russian Federation on 31 December 2022, after the Russian annexation of the Luhansk Oblast, and then reformed into a Combined Arms Army in 2024.

== History ==
=== War in Donbas ===
The 2nd Army Corps was formed on 7 October 2014 as an effort to unite numerous volunteer units under one command. Considered by Ukrainian and Western analysts as a formal part of the Russian 8th Combined Arms Army, it nevertheless had a certain degree of autonomy.

The Corps was deployed along the contact line that stretched from the Russian border to the DPR border north of Debaltseve, where it met with the 1st Army Corps.

=== Russian invasion of Ukraine ===
In January 2023, it was officially incorporated into the Russian Armed Forces and became part of the 8th Combined Arms Army.

In the summer of 2024, the 2nd Army Corps was reorganised into the 3rd Guards Combined Arms Army. As of August 2024, commander of the army was Major General Dmitry Ovcharov.

== Structure ==
- 84th Guards Motor Rifle Division
  - Leshiy Battalion
  - 14th Territorial Defense Battalion "Prizrak"
  - 2nd Motor Rifle Territorial Defense Battalion
    - "Akhmat" Spetsnaz group
      - "Shustry" detachment
- 6th Separate Guards Cossack Motor Rifle Brigade
- 7th Separate Motor Rifle Brigade
- 85th Separate Motor Rifle Brigade
- 88th Separate Motor Rifle Brigade
- 123rd Separate Guards Motor Rifle Brigade (formerly 2nd Guards Motor Rifle Brigade)
  - Zarya Battalion
- 2nd Guards Artillery Brigade (formerly 10th Guards Artillery Brigade)
- 12th Territorial Defense Battalion "Rome"
- 13th Territorial Defense Battalion "Kulkin"
- 15th Territorial Defense Battalion "USSR Bryanka"
- 201st Motor Rifle Regiment
- 39th Radiation, Chemical, and Biological Defense Regiment
- Separate Commandant's Regiment
- 4th Separate Tank Battalion (formerly Separate Mechanised Battalion "August")
- Separate Anti-aircraft Missile Defense Artillery Battalion
- Separate Repair and Recovery Battalion
- Separate Command and Security Battalion
- Separate Material Support Battalion
- Separate Reconnaissance Battalion
- Special Purpose Battalion
- 204th "Akhmat" Spetsnaz Regiment
  - "Okhotnik" Detachment
    - Chechen "Canada" group
- Reserve units:
  - ~~202nd Motor Rifle Regiment~~ (disbanded September 2022)
  - ~~204th Motor Rifle Regiment~~ (disbanded September 2022)
  - 206th Motor Rifle Regiment
  - 208th Motor Rifle Regiment
  - 254th Motor Rifle Regiment

== See also ==
- 51st Guards Combined Arms Army, formerly the 1st Donetsk Army Corps
