= Chechen State University =

University in Chechnya, Russia

- Чеченский государственный университет
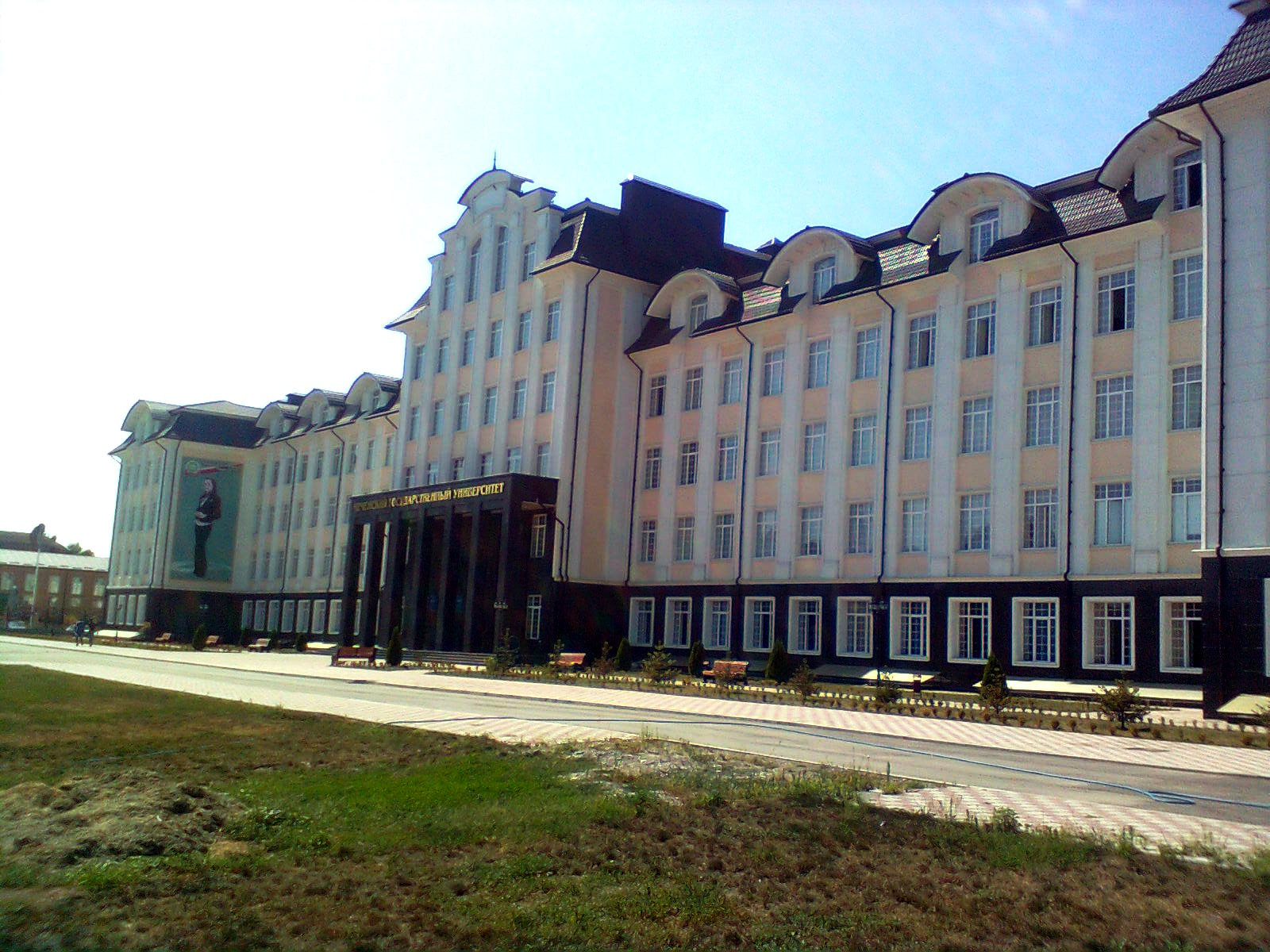
- University building constructed in 1946
- Established: 1938
- Rector: Saidov Zaurbek Aslanbekovich
- Location: Grozny, Chechen Republic; 43°18′42″N 45°42′10″E

Chechen State University (Chechen: Нохчийн пачхьалкхан университет, romanized: Noxçiyn paçẋalqan universitet; Russian: Чеченский государственный университет) is a university located in Grozny, Chechnya, Russia. The school is home to the North Caucasian Centre of Pedagogics. The university traces its roots back to 1938.

== History ==
=== Soviet period ===
Chechen State University, formerly Grozny University and Chechen-Ingush State University, saw a surge of development between 1970 and 1980.

=== After the Chechen War ===
Military activity in the Chechen Republic during the Second Chechen War interrupted the development of Grozny University and destroyed several buildings. The university began restoration soon after the end of military operations and classes resumed in April 2000.

Over 800 instructors currently work at the school's campus. Chechen State University is a scientific and educational centre for the Chechen Republic.

== Notable alumni ==
- Apti Alaudinov (Law Faculty) - major general
- Magomed Bibulatov (Law Faculty) - professional MMA contender for the UFC
- Khas-Magomed Kadyrov (Economics Faculty) - Mayor of Grozny
- Abubakar Yangulbaev (Law Faculty) – human rights lawyer.
