= Ministry of Internal Affairs (Chechnya) =

Министерство внутренних дел по Чеченской Республике Chechen Republic's Interior Ministry
- Abbreviation: МВД по ЧР
- Motto: Служа закону, служим народу By serving the law, we serve the people

Agency overview
- Formed: 1991
- Employees: 9,000

Jurisdictional structure
- Operations jurisdiction: Chechnya, Russia
- General nature: Local civilian police

Operational structure
- Headquarters: 21 Isaev Prospect, Grozny
- Agency executive: Aslan Iraskhanov, Interior Minister
- Parent agency: MVD

Website
- Official Site

Ministry for Internal Affairs of Chechnya (Министерство внутренних дел по Чеченской Республике) is the local law enforcement agency of Chechnya. The Ministry is subordinated directly to the Russian Interior Ministry and the President of Chechnya.

The Main Headquarters is in Grozny, Chechen Republic, Russia.

== History ==
The Chechen police was formed in November 1917 when the first proletarian militia forces were established.

In November 1920, the Congress of Terek region was proclaimed the Mountain Autonomous Soviet Socialist Republic, and the first People's Commissar of Internal Affairs (MVD) was Idris Zyazikov. The police force was renamed General Directorate of Police.

=== World War II ===
At the beginning of World War II, many police officers voluntarily went to the front. The fight against crime, especially in the first months of the war, was complicated by large crowds of people arriving from areas near the front at the railway stations of Grozny, Gudermes and other places. During the war, the police monitored the observance of blackouts, strengthened the passport regime, and caught deserters and enemy spies.

=== 1960s ===
In the postwar period, in the 1960s, the policing activities of all police services (criminal investigation, the administrative divisions of the service, traffic police, etc.) had increased. There was a new system for the protection of public order in a single dislocation, increasing the contribution to the protection of public order, making the night police and police mobile group. Organizing and coordinating the role of the operational-duty unit increased with the creation of mobile police teams. The effectiveness of the disclosure of crimes to a great extent dependent on the precise exchange of information on organized crime, suspects, and stolen merchandise.

=== After the collapse of the Soviet Union ===
The police force had many difficulties after the collapse of the Soviet Union, including the growth of sociopolitical tensions in the community, ethnic conflicts, and a worsening economic situation. The law enforcement agencies, as an important instrument of the state, were given the task of protecting the citizens from criminal law enforcement. In the early 1990s, the sociopolitical and criminal situation in the Chechen Republic became extremely difficult. Periods of law "outrage" were followed by periods of prolonged fighting and, at times, anarchy.

=== 1990s ===
At the end of 1999, during the Second Chechen War, due to the question of the reconstruction of the Ministry of Interior, the leadership of the Russian Interior Ministry decided to establish an Office of Internal Affairs, Ministry of Internal Affairs for the Chechen Republic.

In order to restore the state bodies of executive power, personal security, human rights and freedoms in the Chechen Republic, the Russian Interior Ministry in December 1999 established the Office of Internal Affairs, Ministry of Internal Affairs for the Chechen Republic.

The Department of Internal Affairs, Ministry of Internal Affairs of the Chechen Republic with a small number of staff, consisting of units of the criminal police, police, public safety, logistics and staff divisions began their work in Mozdok, Republic of North Ossetia–Alania.

=== 2000s ===
In April 2000, the stationed Department of Internal Affairs, with a staff of over 1,000 police officers, became the town of Gudermes. That was the beginning of the formation of organs and bodies of the future of the Chechen MVD.

In order to improve the management of agencies and departments of the Interior, improve efficiency in fighting crime and maintain law and order in the Chechen Republic, on November 10, 2002, under the order of the Ministry of Internal Affairs of Russian Federation No. 1088 the Internal Affairs Ministry of Internal Affairs of the Chechen Republic was reorganized into the Ministry of Internal Affairs of the Chechen Republic.

In 2000, the special police squad was one of the first frontline units that participated in special and combat operations. The number of riot police stood at about 300 fighters.

The Office of the Private Security was formed in 2001 to protect the oil and gas industry, as oil business-related crime, responsible for economic and environmental damage, was widespread at that time, and oil processing plants existed in almost every village. Currently, police regiments perform tasks not only for the protection of oil complexes, but also with other parts of the Chechen police on operational, preventive and special events.

Regiment patrol police in the Ministry of Internal Affairs of the Chechen Republic were formed in 2003. The main objective of police is to protect public order and the prevention of crimes and administrative offenses.

A year later, in 2004 the Ministry of Chechen Republic created the patrol special police of Kadyrov. Today, the regiment is a very combat-ready mobile unit in the interior of the Chechen Republic. This unit is tasked to perform difficult and dangerous jobs, including operations to free hostages, remove illegal armed groups, and seize weapons and ammunition.

The bodies of internal affairs were formed in difficult conditions, such as the continued terrorist attacks by members of the underworld gangs, which were very high, and the level of crimes related to kidnapping.

In order to intensify the fight against banditry and kidnapping, in August 2005 the structure of the republican Ministry of Interior established the Office for Combating Organized Crime, to which is assigned, among other functions, to counter terrorism, fighting against banditry and kidnapping.

== Structure ==
- Russian MIA Administration for the City of Grozny
- Management
- Office Management and Regime
- Legal Department
- Duty Unit
- Department of Information and Public Relations
- Operational Search Section
- Center for Licensing
- Rear
- Department of Private Security
- Information Center
- Traffic police department
- Investigative Department
- Criminal Investigation Department
- Office of Economic Security and Anti-Corruption
- Center for Countering Extremism
- Personnel Department
- Forensic Center

Today, the Ministry of Interior of the Chechen Republic, is staffed with all the basic service units, including 20 municipal and district departments of Interior, riot police, the Office for Combating Organized Crime, the Kadyrov regiment patrol special police, the police regiment for the protection of objects petrocomplex in the Chechen Republic, and the Office of Traffic Police.

== Ministers ==
=== Head of the Chechen Interior Department ===
- Sergey Arenin (2000–2001)
- Said-Selim Peshkhoyev (2001–2002)

=== Minister of the Interior ===
- Ruslan Tsakaev (December 2002-April 2003)
- Alu Alkhanov (April 2003-27 December 2004)
- Police Lieutenant-General Ruslan Alkhanov (27 December 2004 - 2023)
- Police Lieutenant-General Aslan Iraskhanov
