= Ruslan Alkhanov =

Russian politician and Police Colonel General

- Руслан Алханов
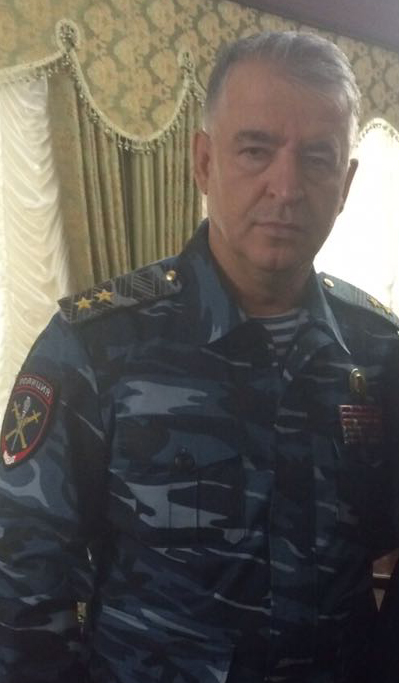

Minister of Internal Affairs of the Chechen Republic
- In office 27 December 2004 – 7 September 2023
- Preceded by: Alu Alkhanov
- Succeeded by: Aslan Iraskhanov

Personal details
- Born: Ruslan Shakhayevich Alkhanov; 27 April 1962 (age 63) Tsentaroy, Russia, Soviet Union

Ruslan Shakhayevich Alkhanov (Russian: Руслан Шахаевич Алханов; born on 27 April 1962), is a Russian politician and Police Colonel General as of 2022 who is currently the Minister of Internal Affairs of the Chechen Republic since 27 December 2004.

In June 2004, Alkhanov became Acting Minister, and on 27 December, he was officially sworn into office as the Minister of Internal Affairs of Chechnya.

He repeatedly spoke negatively and promised to punish one of the leaders of the terrorists, Doku Umarov.

== Awards ==
In September 2022, Alkhanov was awarded a Russian occupation forces' title Hero of the Luhansk People's Republic by Leonid Pasechnik.

== Family ==
He is married to his wife Tamara Borisovna, and has three sons, four daughters, and eight grandchildren.

His son, Artur, is the head of the Argun police department. His other son, Bislan, is the head of the Department of Internal Affairs for the Grozny region of the Chechen Republic.
