= Benoy (teip) =

Largest Chechen teip

Regions with significant populations
- Russia: 100,000 (as of 1980s)
- Chechnya: ?

Languages
- Chechen

Religion
- Sunni Islam

Related ethnic groups
- Tsontaroy

Benoy (Russian: Беной; Chechen: Беной, romanized: Benoy) is a teip in Chechnya. It has historically been the largest by size and one of the most influential politically.

== Classification ==
Benoy has been grouped to the tukkhum Nokhchmahkakhoy (Russian: Нохчмахкахой).

=== Branches ===
Nine branches (Nek'e) of the Benoy teip include:

- Edi
- Ati
- Zhobi
- Chopal

== History ==
Its name is derived from the eponymous place name Benoy, itself coming perhaps from the Urartian endonym Biaina (cognate to the place names Lake Van, Van, Yerevan). It is viewed as the teip's ancestral aul (village), located nowadays in Nozhay-Yurtovsky District, in the Chechen highlands. Due to being resettled at multiple points in history, members of the Benoy teip nowadays reside in most of Chechnya.

=== Caucasian war ===
During the Caucasian War, via Benoyn Boyshar, Benoy hosted Ghazi Muhammad and Imam Shamil, the first and third imams respectively of the Caucasian Imamate. On 29 January 1861, due to the worsened relations with the Russian Tsarist regime, 50 families from Benoy were forcibly deported and resettled in surrounding places. In 1877, after being resettled by its inhabitants and attempted peaceful negotiations with the Tsarist regime, the village was destroyed and burned down.

=== Soviet era ===
In 1944, during the Soviet era, the selo was renamed Ichichali as part of the forced deportation of the Chechen and Ingush populations, and was repopulated with people from neighboring Dagestan.

However, in 1958, after the restoration of the Chechen-Ingush Autonomous Soviet Socialist Republic, the village was returned to its original name of Benoy and the Dagestani residents were resettled back to Dagestan.

== Notable members ==
=== Historical ===
- Benoyn Boyshar, Chechen general in the early 1800s

=== In modern times ===
- Kadyrov family
  - Akhmad Kadyrov, head of the Chechen Republic from 2000 to 2004
  - Ramzan Kadyrov, head of the Chechen Republic since 2007
- Yamadayev family, Chechen warlords
  - Sulim Yamadayev
  - Ruslan Yamadayev
  - Dzhabrail Yamadayev
- Odes Baysultanov, Chechen politician
- Adam Delimkhanov, Chechen politician
- Apti Alaudinov, Chechen military

== Sources ==
- Suleymanov, A. S. (1997). Топонимия Чечни [Toponymy of Chechnya]. Nalchik: El-Fa. ISBN 5-88195-263-4. Archived from the original on 2014-11-07.
