= 487th Separate Helicopter Regiment =

Russian military grouping

The 487th Separate Helicopter Regiment (487 ovp) (Russian: 487-й отдельный вертолётный полк (487 овп); Military Unit Number 44936) is a helicopter regiment of the Russian Aerospace Forces. Based at Budyonnovsk, the regiment is part of the 4th Air and Air Defense Forces Army.

== History ==
The 487th Separate Helicopter Regiment was formed in 1989 at Prenzlau, East Germany as part of the Western Group of Forces. The regiment included the former separate divisional helicopter squadrons of the 20th Guards Combined Arms Army, consolidating control of them at the army level. According to 19 November 1990 data released under the Treaty on Conventional Armed Forces in Europe, the regiment included 25 Mil Mi-24 attack helicopters and seventeen Mil Mi-8 transport helicopters. It was relocated to Werneuchen airfield on 30 April 1991.

The regiment was relocated to Budyonnovsk, Stavropol Krai in the North Caucasus Military District on 1 September 1993 as Russian forces withdrew from Germany. It fought in the East Prigorodny conflict, the 1991–1992 South Ossetia War, and the war in Abkhazia. The regiment lost 26 personnel during the First Chechen War and the Second Chechen War. Seven servicemen were made Hero of Russia, including two posthumously. An Mi-24 of the regiment was shot down near Nozhay-Yurt in August 2002 with both pilots killed. An Mil Mi-26 transport helicopter of the regiment was shot down on 26 August 2002 with the loss of 127 soldiers aboard, the deadliest loss of a Russian military aircraft at the time. As a result of the incident, the commander of Russian Army Aviation was relieved of his post. Regimental commander Lieutenant Colonel Anatoly Kudyakov was convicted of negligence for allowing the helicopter to be overloaded but ultimately acquitted.

In 2006, part of the regiment was still permanently deployed to Khankala against the continuing Chechen insurgency. Officers of the regiment served on UN peacekeeping missions in Sierra Leone, Angola, and Sudan. The 487th was involved in the Russo-Georgian War of 2008.

The regiment received its first six new Mil Mi-28N attack helicopters in April 2009. It became the first operational unit to field the Mi-28N, which replaced its Mi-24Ps. Under the 2009 Russian military reform, the regiment was reorganized as the 387th Army Aviation Base.
