= Zamid Chalaev =

Russian Colonel and Hero of the Russian Federation

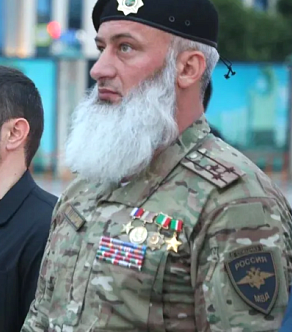
- Zamid Chalaev in 2026
- Native name: Замид Алиевич Чалаев
- Born: August 19, 1981 (age 45); Benoy, Nozhay-Yurtovsky District, Chechen-Ingush ASSR
- Allegiance: Russia (2004-present)
- Service years: 2004 — present
- Rank: Police Colonel
- Conflicts: Russian invasion of Ukraine (since 2022); Siege of Mariupol (2022)

Zamid Alievich Chalaev (Russian: Замид Алиевич Чалаев; born August 19, 1981, Benoy, Chechen-Ingush ASSR, Soviet Union) is a military officer of the Russian Federation who currently holds the rank of Police Colonel. He was awarded the Hero of the Russian Federation in May 2021. He is under sanctions from more than 30 countries for participating in the 2022 Russo-Ukrainian war.

== Early life and career ==
Chalaev was born on August 19, 1981, in the village of Benoy, Nozhai-Yurtovsky District, Chechen-Ingush ASSR, Soviet Union. He has 4 brothers - Murad, Iskhak, Bekkhan and Takhir.

Chalaev joined the Ministry of Internal Affairs of Russia in 2004 and served in law-enforcement units in Chechnya. He became commander of the Akhmad Kadyrov Regiment in July 2019.

Chalaev is the commander of the Second Special Purpose Police Regiment of the Ministry of Internal Affairs of the Russian Federation in the Chechen Republic.

In March 2022, He participated in the 2022 Russo-Ukrainian war and fought in the Siege of Mariupol, and in other regions such as Lysychansk, Sievierodonetsk, etc.

== Sanctions ==
On June 23, 2023, Chalaev was included in the sanctions list of all EU countries for participating in the 2022 Russo-Ukrainian war and his involvement in the deportation of Ukrainian children and the forced re-education and military training of Ukrainian children.

On August 24, 2023, Chalaev was added to the Specially Designated Nationals sanctions list for his involvement in the forced removal of Ukrainian children to Russia. He is also under sanctions from Switzerland, Ukraine and Japan.

== Awards and titles ==
- Hero of the Russian Federation (May 2021)
- Hero of the Chechen Republic
- Hero of the Luhansk People's Republic (2022)
- Honorary Citizen of the Chechen Republic (July 6, 2022)
- Order of Kadyrov

== See also ==
- List of Heroes of the Russian Federation
- Sergey Rudskoy
