= Meskety =

Village in Nozhay-Yurtovsky District, Russia

- Interactive map of Meskety
- Location of Meskety
- Coordinates: 43°09′34″N 46°21′37″E
- Country: Russia
- Federal subject: Chechnya
- Elevation: 315 m (1,033 ft)

Population
  - Estimate (2021): 4,507 )
- Time zone: UTC+3 (MSK)
- Postal code: 366221
- OKTMO ID: 96625425101

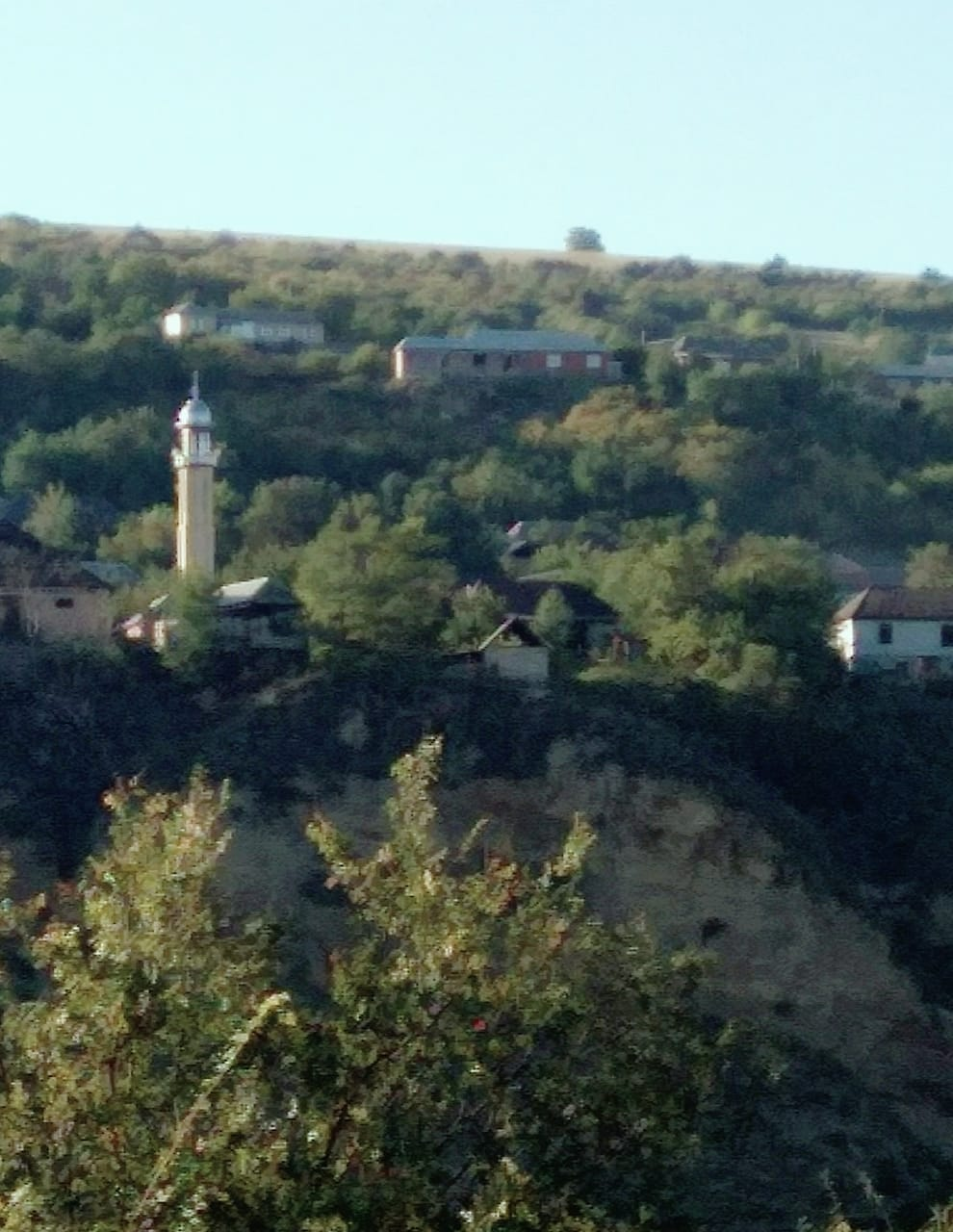
Meskety

Meskety (Russian: Мескеты; Chechen: Мескита, Meskita) is a rural locality (a selo) in Nozhay-Yurtovsky District of the Chechen Republic, Russia, located on the Aksay river. As of the 2021 Census, its population was 4,507.

== Notable people ==
- Abuzar Aydamirov author of Anthem of the Chechen Republic of Ichkeria.
