= Umar Israilov =

Chechen warlord

Umar Sharpuddievich Israilov (Russian: Умар Шарпуддиевич Исраилов; c. 1982 – January 13, 2009) was a former bodyguard of Chechen President Ramzan Kadyrov who became a critic of the Chechen government. He was shot and killed in exile in Vienna, Austria on January 13, 2009.

== Biography and murder ==
Israilov fought against Russian forces during the Second Chechen War, but was captured in 2003. He began serving as Ramzan Kadyrov's bodyguard in a militia that was led by Ramzan Kadyrov, the son of Chechen President Akhmad Kadyrov. Israilov claimed to have witnessed killings, torture, and other crimes by Kadyrovites including Ramzan Kadyrov and Adam Delimkhanov, who went on to serve in the Russian Parliament.

In 2006 Israilov and his father, Sharpuddi Israilov, each filed complaints in the European Court of Human Rights against the Russian and Chechen governments. The case was dropped after the court sought more information but could not locate the Israilovs, who had gone into hiding.

Stratfor quoted claims by unnamed sources that Israilov was murdered "by organized criminal assets in Vienna at the behest of Chechen President Ramzan Kadyrov and with Kremlin approval."

After the killing, Austrian police arrested and questioned eight Chechen men who had either received or applied for asylum in Austria. In February 2009 police in Poland arrested a man identified as Turpal Ali J. whom they described as an "accomplice" to Israilov's murderer.

=== Prosecution ===
An Austrian court sentenced three individuals to prison for Israilov's murder on June 1, 2011. Otto Kaltenbrunner, Suleiman Dadayev and Turpal-Ali Yesherkayev received sentences of life, 19 years, and 16 years, respectively. Austrian police believe Chechen President Kadyrov ordered Israilov's abduction, an action that later ended in murder. Lecha Bogatirov, the man suspected of firing the fatal shots, remained at large.

== Controversy over "List of sentenced to death" ==
As reported by C.J. Chivers, a journalist for the International Herald Tribune, in August 2008 Austrian authorities interviewed a Chechen man who said he had been sent to find Umar Israilov, and that Israilov was on a list of enemies whom Kadyrov allegedly intended to have killed. The man asked Israilov "to withdraw his complaints or risk being killed and having his family killed." However the Austrians did not detain the man and did not provide protection for Israilov.

The summary of Arthur Kurmakayev's (the man previously mentioned) interrogation by the Austrian police was published by The New York Times, Le Monde and Novaya Gazeta.

In a February 3, 2009 exclusive interview with the independent Internet media Caucasian Knot (a media project related to the Memorial society), Chivers stated that "authenticity of the list of 300 natives from Chechnya, sentenced to death by President Kadyrov, which was published in the western press, has not been proved yet". He said, "I have not seen this list, so I don't know details of its contents, and this is obviously a rich area for follow-on reporting. However, I can't guarantee its authenticity" and stated that it's very easy to compose a false list, while sites of Chechen separatists very often publish propaganda among the actual information.

On February 9, 2009, Arthur Kurmakayev, who was questioned by Austrian police about Israilov's killing, told the Russian newspaper Novaya Gazeta that Austrian police had libeled him with a false report. Kurmakayev denied any connection with Kadyrov or the security services.

== Official responses ==
The day after the murder, The Moscow Times interviewed Timur Aliyev, an adviser to Kadyrov and a former journalist who covered the First and Second Chechen Wars extensively:

Timur Aliyev ... said by telephone from Grozny that he had never heard of Israilov. He also expressed doubt that the murder could be an act of revenge by the Chechen leadership. "There are other Chechens, more important, known and influential, who file complaints against Russia in Europe and criticize Kadyrov, but they still walk around safe and sound," Aliyev said.

On January 23, 2009, Lema Gudayev, Kadyrov's press secretary, alleged that the media had "launched a massive and deliberate campaign aimed at discrediting the leadership and the president of the Chechen Republic." According to Gudayev, "Having lost all their positions in the armed resistance to the authorities, the so-called ideologues of terrorism have launched a massive information war against Chechnya and its president, Kadyrov."
