= 2002 Khankala Mi-26 crash =

Shootdown of a Russian helicopter in the Second Chechen War

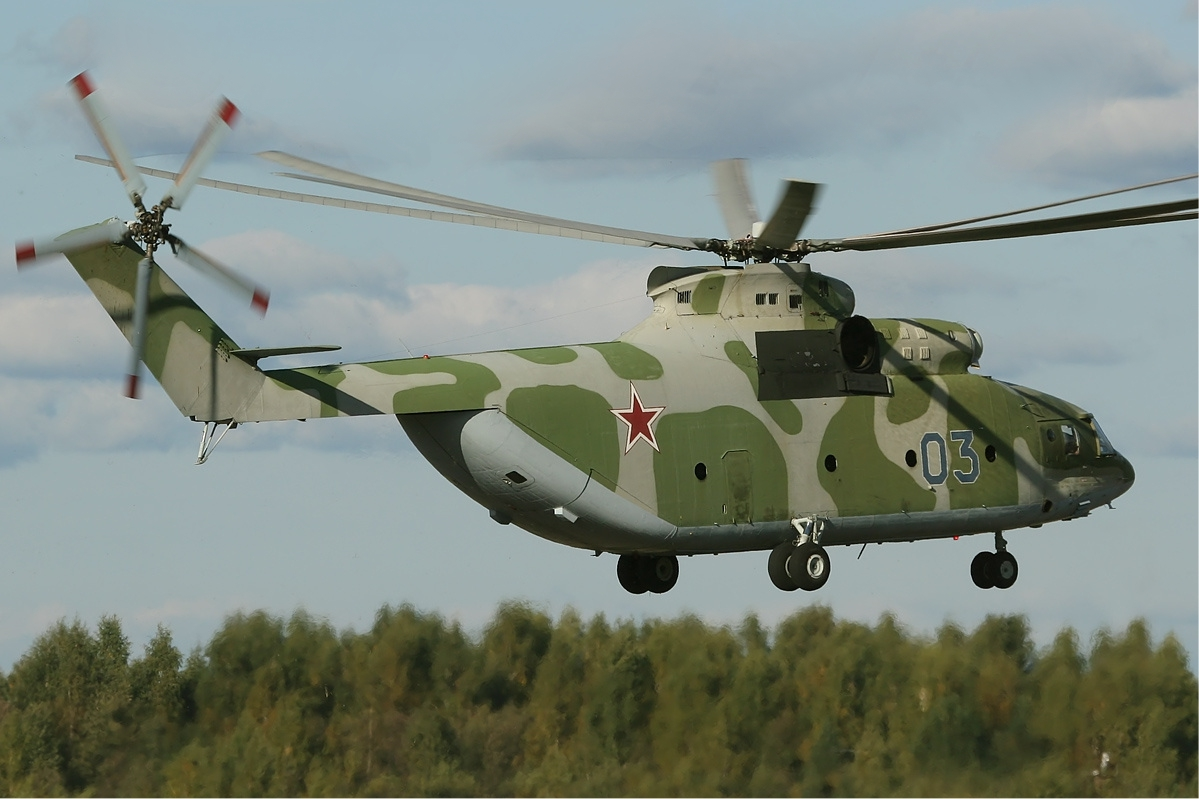
- A Russian Air Force Mil Mi-26 similar to the helicopter that was shot down.

Incident
- Date: 19 August 2002
- Summary: Shot down by Chechen separatists with 9K38 Igla
- Site: Khankala, Chechnya, Russia; 43°17′49″N 45°46′12″E

Aircraft
- Aircraft type: Mil Mi-26
- Operator: Russian Air Force
- Registration: 89 Red
- Occupants: 147
- Passengers: 142
- Crew: 5
- Fatalities: 127
- Injuries: 20
- Survivors: 20

On 19 August 2002, a group of Chechen separatists armed with a man-portable air-defense system brought down a Russian Mil Mi-26 helicopter in a minefield, which resulted in the death of 127 Russian soldiers in the greatest loss of life in the history of helicopter aviation. It is also the deadliest aviation disaster ever suffered by the Russian Armed Forces.

== Attack ==
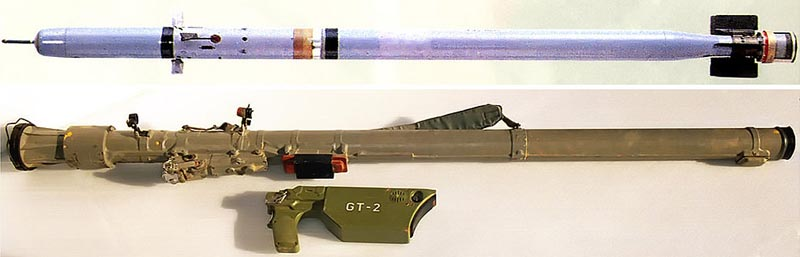
A 9K38 Igla launcher and missile

On 19 August 2002 during the insurgency phase of the Second Chechen War, Chechen separatist fighters launched a Russian-made 9K38 Igla shoulder-fired, heat-seeking surface-to-air missile which hit an overloaded Mil Mi-26 heavy transport helicopter of the 487th Separate Helicopter Regiment, causing it to crash-land and burn at Khankala military air base near Chechnya's capital city of Grozny. The helicopter was ferrying 142 soldiers and officers belonging to various units, mostly from the 20th Guards Motor Rifle Division, from the Russian Air Force base at Mozdok, Republic of North Ossetia–Alania.

According to Russian military analyst Pavel Felgenhauer:

The missile hit one of the engines as the Mi-26 was approaching Khankala, and the helicopter crash-landed in a minefield that made up part of the federal military headquarters' perimeter defenses. Some of the survivors, attempting to abandon the wrecked Mi-26, are reported to have been killed by 'friendly' anti-personnel mine explosions.

The interior of the helicopter flooded with fuel and its jammed doors could not be opened. Only the crew of 5 and 29 passengers managed to escape through the small cockpit exit hatch. Fourteen of the survivors died over the next few days from severe burns.

Russian forces from Khankala launched a search for the attackers immediately after the crash, but only managed to recover the spent tube that had contained the Igla missile.

== Aftermath ==
On 21 August 2002, a national day of mourning was declared for the following day by Russian President Vladimir Putin in connection with the catastrophe, which the media called "the second Kursk". The separatist news agency Kavkaz Center described the crash as the "greatest act of sabotage by Chechen fighters in two years". Some Russian media, including Izvestiya, voiced anger at an apparent cover-up attempt, accusing the military of "as usual" trying to conceal the casualties. The crash led to the suspension of the Russian army's Aviation commander, Colonel-General Vitaly Pavlov, who later resigned from his post in September. The regimental commander of the 487th, Lieutenant Colonel Anatoly Kudyakov, was convicted of negligence of allowing the helicopter to be overloaded but ultimately acquitted of the charges.

On 24 September, footage of the helicopter downing was obtained by the Associated Press from a Turkish news agency along with a statement by separatist Chechen President Aslan Maskhadov announcing: "Here is a helicopter that is on fire and falling near Khankala. It was hit by our Igla anti-aircraft missile." It was also the first video that showed Maskhadov using Islamic insignia and flag, instead of Chechen ones, and referring to the fighters around him as "our mujahideen", in what was seen as his apparent and abrupt turn towards Islamism.

In an undated tape, Maskhadov recalls the Russian investigators' early official version that the helicopter crashed because of technical difficulties before announcing that it was shot down; he then presents a handgun to the fighter said to have downed the helicopter. The tape was also aired on television in Chechnya when the separatists used the REN TV frequency to broadcast it locally during that same month.

It was believed that the missile that destroyed the helicopter was launched from one of the many battle-damaged five-story apartment blocks on the outskirts of Grozny. The Russian military responded to the loss of the Mi-26 by demolishing several blocks in the already half-destroyed Khankala residential area adjoining the base in November, in spite of protests from the pro-Russian Chechen administration. It was initially flatly denied by Colonel Boris Podoprigora, but later admitted by the Russian military spokesman Major-General Ilya Shabalkin, who said that the action was carried out with the goal of preventing the fighters from using the area to lay ambushes close to the base.

As a result, around 100 families were left homeless and NTV reported they were given barely any time to leave and could take only some personal belongings. Regarding this, General Shabalkin commented that the local residents "had been watching the bandits preparing terror attacks and failed to inform law enforcers of their plans" which "is considered to be abetting illegal armed formations, and complicity in a criminal plot".

In response, the Russian State Duma deputy for Chechnya, Aslambek Aslakhanov, demanded an explanation from the top military command in Chechnya. The area had been also shelled in August following an unrelated crash of a Mil Mi-8 helicopter carrying two high-ranking Russian military officials, killing everyone on board, which was allegedly caused by a missile launched from the Oktyabrsky district of Grozny.

The Mi-26 helicopter was designed to carry 80 troops, while the one that was destroyed was loaded with 142 passengers (according to Timur Aliyev, "an indication in itself that the Russian military is reluctant to travel by road, even in areas like northern Chechnya far from the rebel heartlands"). According to the BBC, citing Kommersant, "The Mi-26 often flies to Khankala with 100–110 people on board, plus a huge amount of cargo, including cheap Ossetian vodka."

Felgenhauer wrote: "I once had a ride on a Mi-26 from Mozdok to Grozny, together with some 50 service personnel and journalists on top of a stockpile of crates with tons of artillery shells and other munitions." In 2003, the Russian officer in charge of dispatching the helicopter, Lieutenant-Colonel Alexander Kudyakov, was charged and convicted of negligence and violating flight regulations. Pravda commented that he "had to become a scapegoat" and according to Kudyakov himself the judge told him that he should have refused to go to Chechnya in the first place.

A Chechen accused of transporting the missile, preparing it for launching, and filming the attack, 27-year-old Grozny resident Doku Dzhantemirov, was found guilty of planning and carrying out "an act of terror" in April 2004. He was sentenced to life imprisonment for "terrorism, premeditated murder with special cruelty, banditry, and attempted murder of servicemen", and was also ordered to pay 100,000 rubles ($3,500) to the relatives of each victim and 50,000 rubles ($1,720) to each of the survivors. At his trial, Dzhantemirov maintained that he was not a terrorist but a soldier of the state of Ichkeria. Four other Chechens accused of taking part in the attack were still being sought.
