= Timur Mutsurayev =

Chechen singer and bard (born 1976)

Timur Mutsurayev Муцурай ХӀамзат-кӀант Темур (Chechen) Тимур Хамзатович Муцураев (Russian)
- Also known as: Tимерболат
- Born: Timur Mutsurayev; 25 July 1976 (age 50)
- Origin: Grozny, Chechen-Ingush ASSR, Soviet Union
- Genres: Music of Chechnya, Bard (Soviet Union), Nasheed
- Occupations: Singer, soldier
- Instruments: Voice, guitar
- Years active: 1991—2008

Timur Khamzatovich Mutsurayev (Chechen: Муцурай ХӀамзат-кӀант Темур; Russian: Тимур Хамзатович Муцураев; born 25 July 1976), also spelled Mucuraev or Mutsuraev, is a Chechen singer-songwriter or bard who sang in Russian and, rarely, in Chechen. A majority of his songs are about the conflict in Chechnya.

== Biography ==
Mutsurayev was born in Grozny on 25 July 1976. In 1991, he became the champion of the Chechen-Ingush ASSR in karate. Mutsurayev's most famous song, titled "Jerusalem", gained airplay during the 1999–2000 Battle of Grozny. It appears in Alexander Balabanov's 2002 War. He participated in the Chechen Wars under the command of Ruslan Gelayev. Many of Mutsurayev's songs are intensely supportive of Chechen independence, and he personally believed that peace negotiations would eventually end the Second Chechen War. As a curiosity, western rock music of the 90's, particularly Metallica and Nirvana, were his greatest inspiration. He also has many songs on Islamic themes. After the end of the Second Chechen War in 2000, he left Chechnya and lived in Azerbaijan and Turkey. In the period from 2000 to 2008, he visited Ukraine several times. More than 30 of his songs were banned by the Russian government as they were labeled "extremist". From May to June 2008, Mutsurayev made two audio recordings in the Chechen language, in which he addressed the “people of Khamzat” (meaning Ruslan “Khamzat” Gelayev) He no longer writes or performs music.

== Music ==
=== Welcome to Hell (1995) ===
Mutsurayev's debut album, Welcome to Hell, was recorded in 1995, when he was 19 years old. The title of the album, and the song of the same name within it, is a reference to an inscription left by the Chechens for Russian soldiers on the walls in Grozny during the first assault on the city, which began on 31 December 1994.

=== Gelaevsky Special Forces (1996) ===
Galaevsky Special Forces, Mutsurayev's second album, Written during his service in the Borz battalion of Ruslan Gelayev. Compared to the previous one, this album contains more songs, many of them are dedicated to those killed in the war. The song "Serzhen-Yurt," is dedicated to Mutsurayev's deceased friend Aslan Yakhyaev, with whom Mutsurayev has professionally engaged in karate since the late 1980s. In 1994, they decided to take part in the war. Despite the fact that the song was released on the second album of Mutsurayev, according to him, it was from this song that his musical career began.

=== Paradise under the shadow of sabers (1997) ===
The song "Russian soldier" also known as "City of death" and "Mom, come and take me away" was allegedly inspired by an unsent letter found on a dead Russian serviceman. The song was very popular among the Russian military. The federal command tried to impose a ban on the distribution of Mutsurayev's songs, but this did not have much success due to the great popularity of these songs.

=== Jerusalem (1998) ===
The album and its title track are considered the most famous of Mutsurayev's works. The album is dedicated to the war in the Holy Land, life, love and anti-Israel themes. The song "Jerusalem" was played at the beginning of Alexei Balabanov's film War. Publicist Avraham Shmulevich regards the song as "blatantly anti-Israel", citing excerpts from an interview with Mutsurayev, where the singer emphasizes the need to "conquer" Jerusalem. The song is on a list of extremist materials, and, despite the free distribution of the film War, the distribution of the song itself in Russia can be regarded as "mass distribution of extremist materials", which is an administrative offense. The theme of Jerusalem is found in other songs of Mutsurayev.

=== Insha'Allah, the gardens are waiting for us (2001) ===
The title of the album contains a ritual prayer exclamation used in Muslim countries as a sign of a Muslim's humility before the will of Allah. The song "Our Sisters" is dedicated to 17-year-old Khava Barayeva, who blew herself up in a truck with explosives near a Russian checkpoint.

=== Russian bans ===
The case on the recognition of Mutsurayev's songs as extremist was submitted to the Yurginsky City Court of the Kemerovo Region in December 2008, but the decision to ban 20 songs was made only on 14 April 2010. It was initially unknown how many songs were considered in court, but according to the Sova Analytical Center, the prosecutor's office tried to ban about 100 songs. Most of Mutsurayev's songs are still available for listening, but the songs included in the Federal List of Extremist Materials are banned. For example, on 25 January 2013 the magistrate of precinct No. 37 of the Maloyaroslavets district of the Kaluga region brought to administrative responsibility and fined a resident of the district who posted the song "Chechens" on his VKontakte page.

Other songs of Mutsurayev do not cause complaints from the Russian authorities, and other artists even perform them in public. On 28 December 2020, on the basis of the decision of the Sovetsky District Court of Bryansk on 7 September 2020, the compositions "Gelaevsky Special Forces" and "Shamil Leads a Detachment" were added to the list of extremist materials on the territory of the Russian Federation.

==== Welcome to Hell - (3 songs banned) ====
- "The city lives"

- "Peacekeepers"

- "Pervomaiskoe"

==== Gelayevsky special forces - (2 songs banned) ====
- "Allahu Akbar"

- "Oppositionist" (Anti -Kadyrovite song)

==== Chechnya on Fire - (1 song banned) ====
- "Chechens"

==== Paradise in the Shadow of Sabers - (3 songs banned) ====
- "Paradise in the Shadow of Sabers"

- "Get up Chechnya"

- "Avar village"

==== Jerusalem - (2 songs banned) ====
- "Gunib"

- "Jerusalem"

==== You're Muslim - (2 songs banned) ====
- "Army of freedom" ("Army of Dzhokhara")

- "Oh Rus! Forget your former glory"

==== Great Jihad - (3 songs banned) ====
- "Great Jihad"

- "Fog rises over the mountains"

- "The World Shudders"

==== Twelve-Thousand Mujahideen - (2 songs banned) ====
- "Twelve-Thousand Mujahideen"

- "Quran"

==== Insha'Allah, the gardens are waiting - (8 songs banned) ====
- "Our sisters" (Dedicated to Khava Barayeva)

- "A Mujahid's Prayer"

- "Chechen Carthage"

- "Islamic Ummah"

- "Islamic Reconquista"

- "Insha'Allah, the gardens are waiting"

- "Sold wings of a Jihad"

- "Gallery of memories" ("Shahids on Judgement Day")("They left")

=== Discography ===
==== Welcome to Hell (1995) ====
1. "Welcome to Hell!"
2. "Bloody horizon" ("We'll be back, Grozny")
3. "Years fly by" ("Wind of Freedom")
4. "Peacekeepers"
5. "Chechen, I"
6. "Grozny, you held the Enemy"
7. "My Father's Land"
8. "Night longing"
9. "My city"
10. "Pervomaiskoe"
11. "Chechen special forces"
12. "Chechnya - the groan of the Departed Sons"
13. "What the Mountains Say"

==== Gelayevsky Special Forces (1996) ====
1. "Allahu Akbar"
2. "Gelayevsky Special Forces"
3. "The fire is burning"
4. "The city lives"
5. "Cherish your friends"
6. "Your name is Grozny"
7. "The king and the shepherd"
8. "Blood for love, or witch mother"
9. "I'm in pain, I'm tired" ("Night again")
10. "Oppositionist" (Anti -Kadyrovite song)
11. "Dedicated to Aslan Yakhyaev"
12. "Dedicated to Magomed Khachukaev"
13. "Serzhen-Yurt"
14. "Fate does not spoil"
15. "Price of freedom"
16. "Pervomaiskoe"

==== Chechnya on Fire (1996) ====
1. "Chechnya on Fire"
2. "Samashki"
3. "Chechens"
4. "Shamil leads a detachment"

==== Paradise in the Shadow of Sabers (1997) ====
1. "For the Motherland, for faith, for freedom"
2. "Daymokhk" (sung in Chechen)
3. "Baysangur" (dedicated to Baysangur of Benoa)
4. "Paradise under the shadow of sabers"
5. "War"
6. "Dzhokhar" (dedicated to Dzhokhar Dudayev)
7. "Holy warriors of Chechnya"
8. "Get up, Chechnya!"
9. "Avar village"
10. "Russian soldier" ("City of death") ("Mom, come and take me away")
11. "Ghazotekh' khelkhina k'enti" (sung in Chechen)
12. "Tears of sadness"

==== Jerusalem (1998) ====
1. "Anthem"
2. "Day of retribution"
3. "Gunib "
4. "Solomon"
5. "If you're weak in spirit"
6. "Life is vanity"
7. "No path of return"
8. "Wind"
9. "Given the vast"
10. "Jerusalem"
11. "I'm leaving"
12. "Extinguished Candle"

==== You're Muslim (1998) ====
1. "Night"
2. "The spirit will enter the throat"
3. "Monotheism" ("You're Muslim")
4. "End war"
5. "Army of Freedom" ("Army of Dzhokhara")
6. "Don't call"
7. "O mercy giver"
8. "O Rus! forget your former glory"
9. "Milky Way"
10. "Goodbye"
11. "Son of Adam"

==== Great Jihad (1999) ====
1. "Us Nakh are people of Nuh"
2. "Life past by"
3. "My Grozny"
4. "Hey, Shahid"
5. "Great Jihad"
6. "Hadith of a Prophet"
7. "Fog rises over the mountains"
8. "String Link"
9. "The world shudders"
10. "Sheikh Mansur"

==== Twelve-Thousand Mujahideen (2000) ====
1. "Prophet Musa"
2. "Twelve-Thousand Mujahideen"
3. "Sacred Jihad" ("Rise Muslims")
4. "Allah, freedom and Jihad"
5. "Quran"
6. "Know that the Heaven gardens are eternal"

==== Insha'Allah, the gardens are waiting (2001) ====
1. "Our sisters" (Dedicated to Khava Barayeva)
2. "A Mujahid's prayer"
3. "Chechen Carthage"
4. "Curse you, Stalin" (based on the mass Chechen deportation and genocide during Operation Lentil in the Second World War)
5. "Islamic Ummah"
6. "Islamic Reconquista"
7. "Insha'Allah, the gardens are waiting"
8. "Sold wings of a Jihad"
9. "Gallery of memories" ("Shahids on Judgement Day")("They left")
