= Benoy, Nozhay-Yurtovsky District, Chechen Republic =

Benoy Беной Бена
- Selo
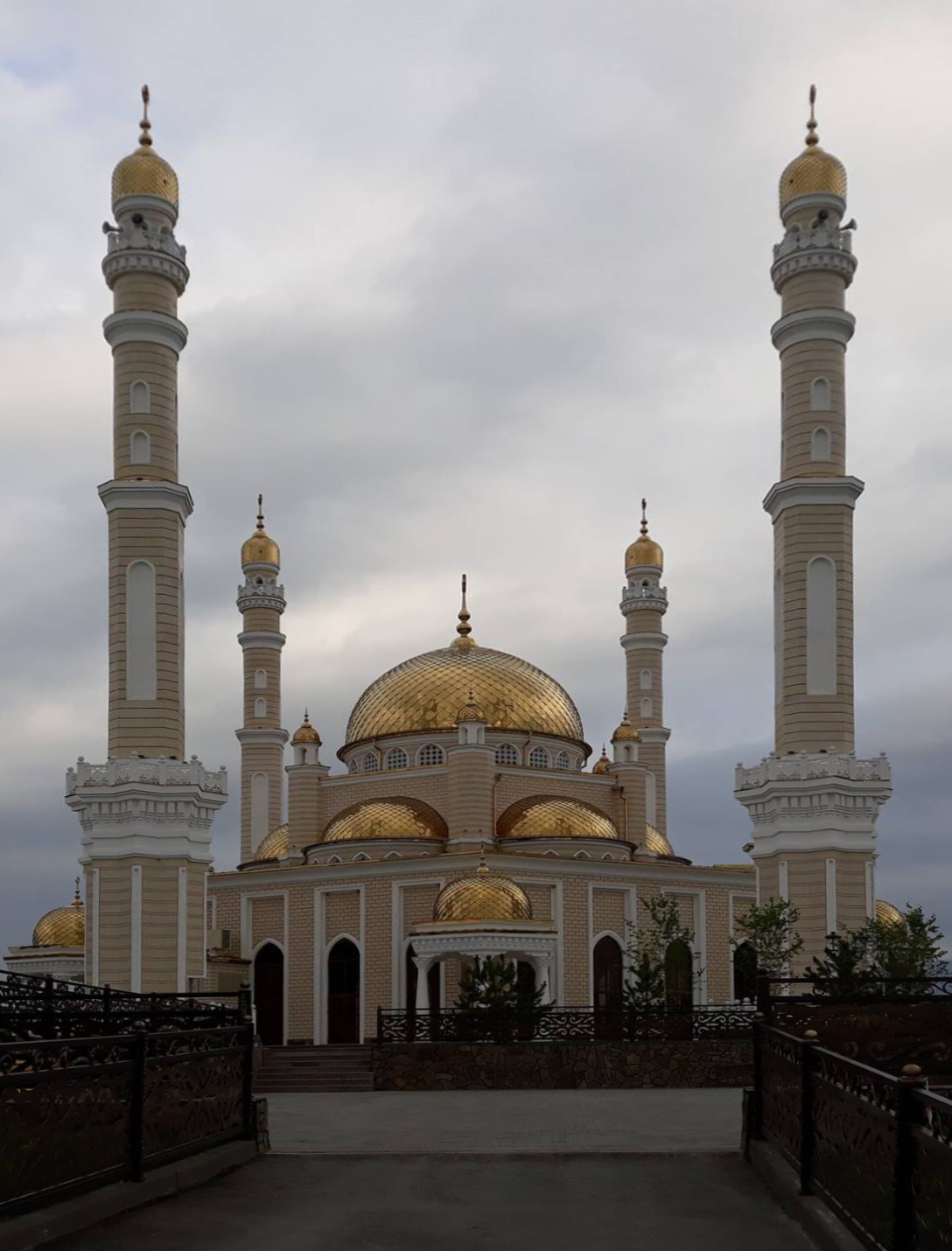
- Mosque in Benoy

- Location within Chechnya Location within Russia
- Coordinates: 42°58′55″N 46°18′25″E
- Country: Russia
- Region: Chechnya
- District: Nozhay-Yurtovsky District
- Time zone: UTC+3:00

Benoy (Russian: Беной; Chechen: Бена, romanized: Bena) is a rural locality (a selo) and the administrative centre of Benoyskoye Rural Settlement in Nozhay-Yurtovsky District, in Chechnya, Russia. Population: 1,216 (2010 census); 2,389 (2002 census).

== History ==
In 1944, during the Soviet era, the selo was renamed Ichichali as part of the forced deportation of the Chechen and Ingush populations, and was repopulated with people from neighboring Dagestan.

However, in 1958, after the restoration of the Chechen-Ingush Autonomous Soviet Socialist Republic, the village was returned to its original name of Benoy and the Dagestani residents were resettled back to Dagestan.

== Geography ==
Benoy is located in the Chechen Republic, Russia. It is situated on the right bank of the Benoyassi River and is approximately 23 km southwest of the district center, Nozhai-Yurt and 90 km southeast of the city of Grozny. The village has neighboring settlements, including Gurzhi-Mokhk to the north, Dengi-Yurt to the northeast, Ozhi-Yurt to the east, Koren-Benoi to the south, Benoi-Vedeno to the southwest, and Pachu to the west. A notable landmark in the village is the Benoi Central Mosque.

== Demography ==
Historical population
Year	Pop.	±%
1990	1,527	—
2002	2,389	+56.5%
2010	1,216	−49.1%

=== Notable residents ===
- Baysangur of Benoy (1794 – 1861), rebel commander
- Adam Delimkhanov (born 1969), politician
- Sulim Yamadayev (1973 – 2009), rebel and military commander
