= Abuzar Aydamirov =

Chechen writer (1933–2005)

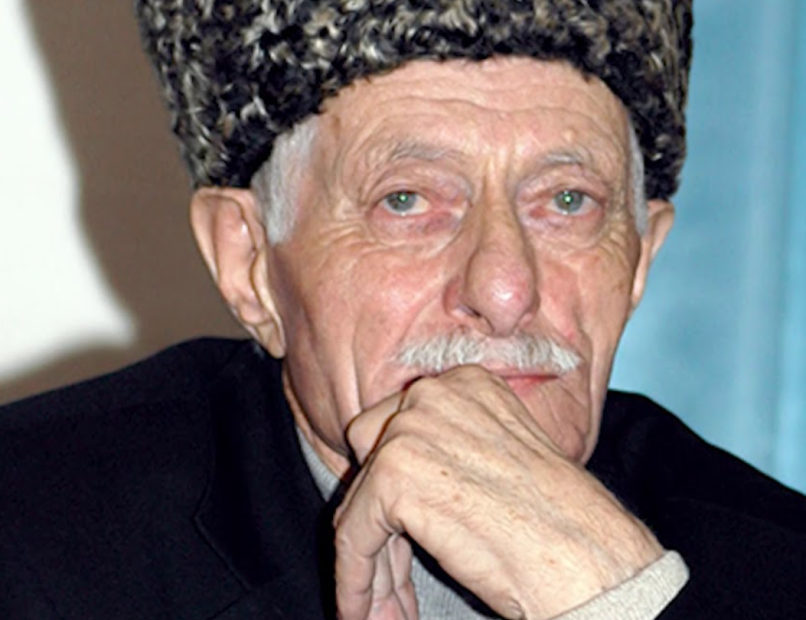
- Born: Abuzar Abdulkhakimovich Aydamirov; 29 October 1933; Meskety, Chechen Autonomous Oblast, Soviet Union
- Died: 27 May 2005 (aged 75); Meskety, Chechnya, Russia
- Occupations: Poet, novelist
- Writing career
- Language: Russian and Chechen
- Notable awards: Order of the Red Banner of Labour; Order of Friendship of Peoples

Abuzar Abdulkhakimovich Aydamirov (Russian: Абузар Абдулхакимович Айдамиров; 29 October 1933 – 27 May 2005) was a Soviet and Chechen novelist and poet. He is the author of a historical trilogy dedicated to the Caucasian Wars, and of the Anthem of the Chechen Republic of Ichkeria.

== Biography ==
Aydamirov was born on 29 October 1933, in the village Meskety of Nozhay-Yurtovsky district. Abuzar was from the Alaroy teip (Kusha-Bukhoy branch) and spent his early childhood in his home village with his father Abdul-Khakim, mother Mukhazar and his several siblings. He was faced with tragic events during the early childhood when his father was arrested and exiled to Siberia which left the family in poverty. Misfortune haunted their family as the family twin children died and their oldest son was arrested because of some shortage of collective farm corn at the warehouse where he worked, and exiled to Siberia. Zainabi, the soul of their family and sister of Abuzar, suddenly died. The death of her daughter finally crippled the health of the unfortunate mother. In February, after eight years of exile, Abdul-Khakim returned home. It was through his father Abdul-Khakim that Abuzar learned the history of the Chechen people. Abuzar and his entire people were deported to Central Asia during the Deportation of the Chechens and Ingush. It was there where his father died in 1949. He grew up and studied there for a big part of his life until he, along with the rest of the Chechen people, moved back to their homeland.

Father did not recover from the last illness. He died on April 14, 1949 in the village of Uspenovka, Karavan region. I lived with my father for eight years, from 1941 to 1949. I saw him both in sorrow and in joy, he served me as a model of high morality, courage, and dignity. And if I retained in myself kindness, patience, mercy, courage — all this I inherited from my father.

— Abuzar Aydamirov, Memoirs. Roads of my life.

The first story of Abuzar Aydamirov was published in 1957. As one of the oldest teachers and mentors in Chechnya, he devoted more than half a century to the education and training of the younger generation in the Chechen language. In 1963, A. Aydamirov graduated from the correspondence department of the Faculty of History and Philology of ChIGPI. In 1967–1969, he passed the Higher Literary Courses at the Literary Institute. M. Gorky. He was awarded the honorary badges "Excellence in Education of the RSFSR" (1997), "Excellence in Education in the USSR" (1985), and in 2002 he was awarded the title "People's Teacher of the Chechen Republic". In addition, he is a People's Writer of Chechen-Ingushetia (1977), Honorary Professor of the Chechen State University (1993), Honorary Academician of the Academy of Sciences of the Chechen Republic (1993). In 1976 he was awarded the Order of the Red Banner of Labor. For thirty years he was a permanent deputy of the Nozhay-Yurt district council, and in 1989-1991 he was a deputy of the Supreme Soviet of the USSR. In 2004, he was elected as the chairman of the Writers' Union of the Chechen Republic.

The 60s became fruitful for Abuzar. One after another his books are published: "Mother's Heart", "In the Native Mountains", "Light in the Mountains", "The Exploits of Genarsolta", "In the Hive", and "In the Name of Freedom". His poems and stories became known to a wide range of readers. Abuzar is credited by many as having reinvigorated interest in Chechen language novels with such novels as his trilogy books on the Caucasian War "Long Nights", "Lightning in the Mountains" and "The Tempest" which have been translated into Arabic, Turkish, French and other European languages. The first book of the trilogy "Long Nights" sold over 5000 copies in just 2 months No other novel in the Chechen language sold this many copies and hundreds of people have specifically learned to read Chechen in order to read this novel. The novel "Long Nights", was in Abuzar's desk for ten years because he refused to make small changes in accordance with the instructions of the officials of the regional committee of the CPSU. But all the same, the novel was released, it was published in 1972 and for a long time was under an unspoken ban. It was translated into Russian only in 1996, and in 1998 it was published in Arabic.

The trilogy and his other two novels describe the history of Chechnya during the Caucasian War in the 19th century until the October Revolution of 1917. Among the heroes of his novels are dozens of ordinary people, peasants, national heroes, as well as Abrek Zelimkhan, Naib Baysangur of Benoa and other leaders of the uprisings of the mountaineers.

Abuzar died in 2005 after a long battle with an illness.

== Legacy ==
- In 2006 the A. Aydamirov Literary-Memorial Museum was opened in Meskety.
- A Biography of Abuzar Aydamirov's life was released in 2007 by his daughter Mashar Aydamirova.
- In 2008, B. Khmelnitsky Street in Grozny was renamed into A. A. Aydamirov Street.
- On October 30, 2013, on the occasion of the 80th anniversary of the birth of A. A. Aidamirov, the National Library of the Chechen Republic was renamed after him.
- In November 2018, a bust of Abuzar Aydamirov was installed on the Writers' Alley of the cultural and historical complex "Courtyard of the Cyrillic alphabet" in Bulgaria.

== Awards and Titles ==
- Order of the Red Banner of Labor (06/17/1981);
- Order of Friendship of Peoples (15.08.1991);
- People's Writer of Checheno-Ingushetia (1977);
- "Excellence in Education of the USSR" (1985);
- Honorary Professor of the Chechen State University (1993);
- Honorary Academician of the Academy of Sciences of the Chechen Republic (1993);
- "Excellence in Education of the RSFSR" (1997);
- "People's Teacher of the Chechen Republic";
