= Adam Delimkhanov =

Russian politician of Chechen descent

- Адам Делимханов
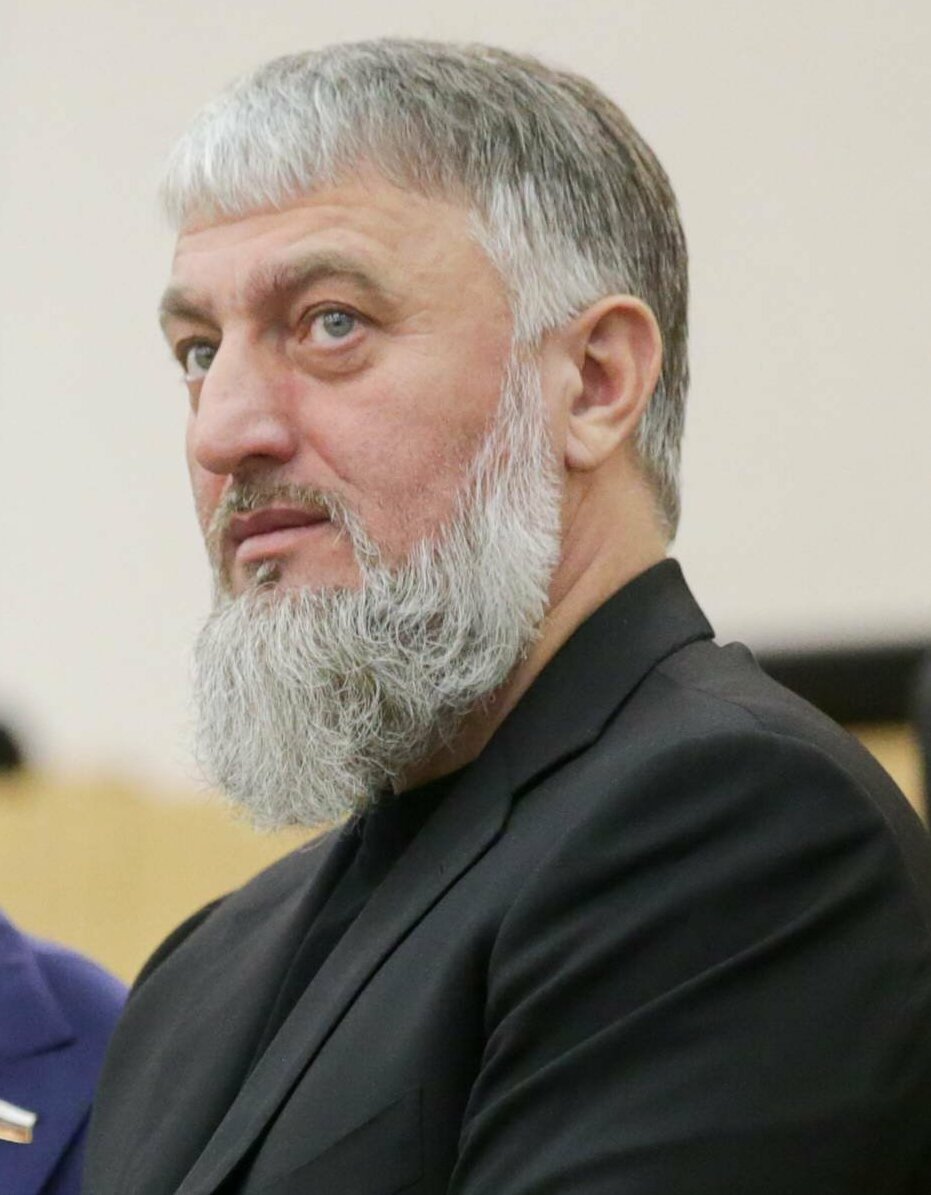
- Delimkhanov in 2018

Member of the State Duma for Chechnya
- Incumbent
- Assumed office 5 October 2016
- Preceded by: Constituency Re-established
- Constituency: Chechnya-at-large (No. 36)

Personal details
- Born: 25 September 1969 (age 57) Benoy, Checheno-Ingush ASSR, RSFSR, Soviet Union
- Party: United Russia
- Education: Chechen State University
- Religion: Islam

Military service
- Allegiance: Soviet Union (1987–1989); Chechnya (1994–2000); Russia (2000–present)
- Branch/service: Russian National Guard
- Rank: Major General
- Unit: Kadyrovites
- Battles/wars: First Chechen War; Second Chechen War; Russo-Ukrainian War; Russian invasion of Ukraine; Siege of Mariupol

Adam Sultanovich Delimkhanov (Russian: Адам Султанович Делимханов; born 25 September 1969) is a Russian politician who has been a member of the State Duma since 2007. He is a member of the ruling United Russia party.

Delimkhanov is an ally of Chechen leader Ramzan Kadyrov.

== Early life and career ==
Adam Delimkhanov was born on 25 September 1969 in Benoy, in the Chechen-Ingush ASSR of the Soviet Union. His family is originally from the town of Dzhalka. From 1987 to 1989, he was conscripted into the Soviet Armed Forces. In 1994, he graduated from Chechen State University in Grozny and was employed as ironworker, supplier, and used car trader. During the First Chechen War, he was the personal driver of Chechen military commander Salman Raduyev. Shortly after Raduyev's arrest on 12 March 2000, Delimkhanov found employment in the security service of pro-Russian Chechen leader Akhmad Kadyrov.

A close associate and cousin of Chechen leader Ramzan Kadyrov, Delimkhanov headed the police division that protected Chechen oil facilities from 2003 to 2006. He was appointed deputy prime minister overseeing security forces in 2006. The next year he was elected to the Russian State Duma on a Vladimir Putin-led United Russia party ticket.

A Chechen exile, Umar Israilov, murdered in Vienna in January 2009, had accused Delimkhanov of beating him in Kadyrov's presence. Delimkhanov declined requests for comment on the allegation. In April 2009, the Dubai police blamed Delimkhanov for having ordered the assassination of the former Chechen warlord and Russian military commander Sulim Yamadayev. Delimkhanov denied the accusation, saying it was a provocation directed to destabilize Chechnya and that he is preparing to sue Dubai police for libel.

As of April 2009, Delimkhanov—along with six other Russian citizens—is wanted by Dubai, one of the emirates of the UAE, in connection with the murder of Sulim Yamadayev, via Interpol.

In 2020, BBC News reported on Delimkhanov in relation to the murder of Imran Aliev.

Delimkhanov shared a video on Instagram on 1 February 2022 threatening human rights lawyer Abubakar Yangulbaev and his family with death. "We will pursue you until we cut off your heads and kill you," he said in the video that was denounced by Amnesty International. In January, Yangulbaev's mother was abducted by Kadyrov's forces.

According to Kadyrov, Delimkhanov participated in the Siege of Mariupol during the 2022 Russian invasion of Ukraine as commander of the Chechen forces in the engagement. On the 26th of April 2022, it was announced by Kadyrov that Delimkhanov has received the Hero of the Russian Federation honorary award by decree of the President, Vladimir Putin. He was awarded the title the same day.

Delimkhanov was also awarded the title Hero of the Luhansk People's Republic on 28 September 2022.

On 1 June 2023, Delimkhanov criticised Yevgeny Prigozhin saying: "If you don't understand, then you can contact us and tell us the place and the time, we will explain to you what you don't understand. You have become a blogger who screams and shouts off to the whole world about all the problems, Stop shouting, yelling and screaming."

Adam Delimkhanov was reported to be "missing" in the occupied Zaporizhzhia Oblast on 14 June 2023. Russian sources claimed he had been wounded, while Ukrainian sources reported that he had been killed by an artillery strike in Prymorsk. Kadyrov later claimed said Delimkhanov was alive and "not even wounded", and that Delimkhanov's alleged disappearance was a hoax designed to troll Ukrainian media. On 2 July 2023, he reappeared in an Instagram video where he shows the current date on his phone, with no visible injuries.

On 30 January 2024, he was elevated to the rank of major general in the Russian Armed Forces. As of 2024, he is viewed as one of the possible successors of Kadyrov.

== Awards ==
- Hero of the Chechen Republic (April 16, 2023) — for outstanding services to the Chechen Republic and its people, courage, heroism, and selflessness demonstrated in defending the interests of the Fatherland
- Order "For Merit to the Fatherland," 4th class (November 7, 2024) — for contribution to the development of parliamentarism, active legislative activity, and many years of conscientious work
- Medal "For the Liberation of Mariupol" (Donetsk People's Republic, 2022)
- Gratitude of the President of the Russian Federation (June 25, 2008) — for merits in strengthening Russian statehood and developing interethnic relations in the Chechen Republic
- Gratitude of the Government of the Russian Federation (December 16, 2019) — for significant contribution to the development of Russian parliamentarism and active legislative activity

== Personal life ==
=== Sanctions ===
In July 2014, the U.S. Treasury Department imposed sanctions on Delimkhanov. These sanctions include freezing of assets in the United States and a ban on commercial transactions.

In July 2022, the European Union imposed sanctions on Delimkhanov in relation to the Russian invasion of Ukraine during his participation in the Siege of Mariupol. He is also sanctioned by Canada under the Special Economic Measures Act (S.C. 1992, c. 17) in relation to the Russian invasion of Ukraine for Grave Breach of International Peace and Security.

=== Wealth ===
In the ranking of 500 Russian billionaires compiled by Finans. magazine in early 2011, Adam Delimkhanov took 314th place. His capital was estimated at 300 million dollars or 9.1 billion rubles. According to official figures for 2011, Delimkhanov received an income of 1.9 million rubles, and his wife 187,000 rubles.
