= Uma Duyev =

Chechen military leader

- Дуин Iума
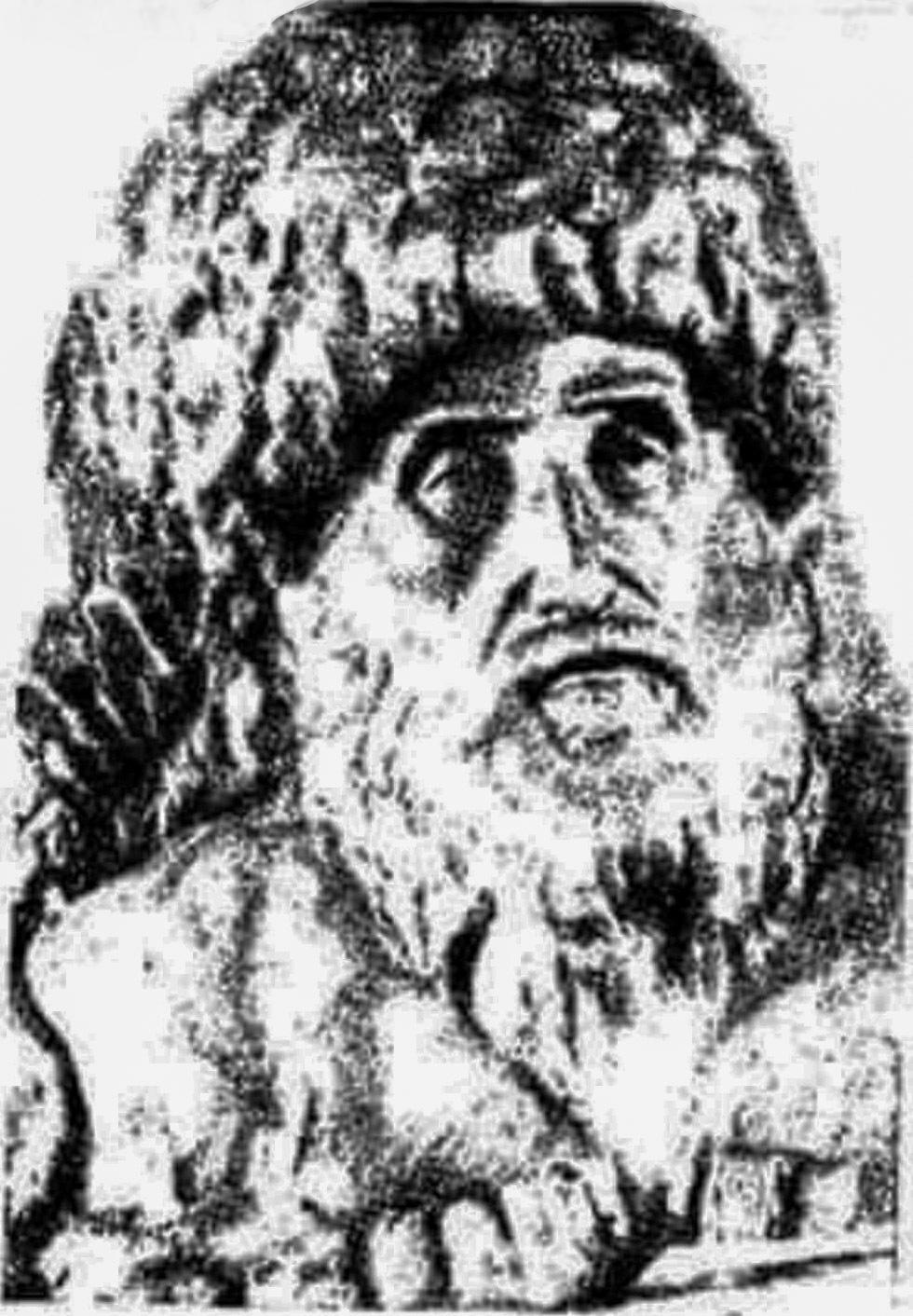
- Bust of Uma Duyev (Russian Museum of Ethnography)
- Born: 1809; Zumsoy, Chechnya
- Died: 6 March 1878 (aged 68–69); Grozny, Chechnya
- Military career
- Allegiance: Caucasian Imamate
- Branch: Army
- Rank: General (1840–1859)
- Conflicts: Caucasian War; Revolt in Chechnya (1860–1861); Revolt in Chechnya and Dagestan (1877)

Uma Duyev (Chechen: Дуин Iума, romanized: Duin 'Uma; 1809 – 18 March [O.S. 6 March] 1878) was a Chechen military leader, mudir and naib of Imam Shamil. He later was naib of Kiyalala and other nearby Dagestani villages, as well as Zumsoy, a representative of the Zumsoy clan, and a participant in the Caucasian War of 1817–1864 as a naib and commander. He was a leader in the uprisings in Chechnya in 1860–1861 and 1877 and Chechen national hero.

== Biography ==
Born in the village of Zumsoy. After the fall of the Imamate in 1859, he hid in the forests and periodically staged sorties and continued to fight until the end of 1861. The sword and seal given to him by Shamil were in the Chechen National Museum, but were lost due to hostilities in 1994.

Abdurrahman Kazikumukh in his essays especially notes some of the naibs:

"I have seen the naibs, whom I have listed here, with my own eyes several times and I myself knew about their position ... Among these naibs there were those who were sincerely devoted to the imam and for the sake of the cause did not spare either their property or themselves among the people subject to them, justice... The most just naibs in Chechnya were: Shuayb, Sukhaib, Akhberdil Mohammed from Khunzakh, Talkhik, Osman, Umma from Zumsa".

In a letter to Naib Aldam, Imam Shamil wrote:

"…I convincingly cut off a piece of land to one person. And this person is my right hand, who considers himself to be half the strength of my Army — Umma Duev. He comes from the highest people by father and mother. The cut-off area is called 'Hanza' and is bordered by water currents in the Chantin borders. Therefore, I give Umma Duev the designated land, and so that none of the naibdom entrusted to you and the inhabitants of Zumsoy do not prevent him from owning the land"

== Insurrections ==
In mid-May 1860, unrest began among the inhabitants of the upper reaches of the Argun. The Georgian military commander Prince Grigol Orbeliani, who temporarily acted as commander of the Caucasian army, reported to Petersburg:

"Uma Duev is highly respected by the population, and in many of his qualities can become the head of a popular uprising"

In 1860, a detachment of Baysangur and Soltamurad began to operate in the district of Ichkeria. In June of that year, Uma Duev and Atabay Ataev angered the Argun society with Zumsoy. Spreading westward, embracing the Shatoi and Chanti communities, passing into the upper reaches of the Little Chechen rivers Martan, Gekhi, then raised the Ackin society near the Georgian Military Highway. Already in November, the uprising acquired a wide scope. The rebellion continued for several months with varying success. A number of Argun and Akinsky villages were burned, and their inhabitants were exiled to the plain. The last battle took place near the Andean Ridge, where Uma tried to break into Dagestan.

After the suppression of the Uma uprising, Duyev hid with his family in a cave. Abdurrahman's essays state that they nearly died of thirst and hunger. The head of the region decided to lure Uma out by the method of "repression of relatives." There followed the arrest of dozens of relatives and putting pressure on the inhabitants of the Argun district, so they have already captured Atabai Ataev. On 15 December 1861, Uma Duev came to Mirsky in the fortification of Shatoi, asking for pardon for the innocent and those whom he had involved in an armed uprising. Later exiled to Smolensk.

After four years, at the numerous requests of the Zumsoy people, he was returned and elected the elder of the village. On the way home he also visited Imam Shamil in Kaluga. In addition, the regional administration took hostage his youngest seven-year-old son Dada and sent him to Russia to raise him as an officer.

=== Uprising in Chechnya and Dagestan (1877–1878) ===
70-year-old Uma-Khadzhi Duev, who in appearance evoked the feeling of a humble old man, during his pilgrimage to Mecca, in parallel communicated with Gazi-Magomed to support the rebellion. In April 1877, Alibek-Khadzhi Aldamov, the elected imam, led an anti-Russian uprising, and Uma appeared among the rebels in Cheberloi. After the brutal suppression of the rebellion, there was a slight lull. Then Uma raised an uprising in another place — in Zumsoy. Lokhvitsky opposed him in Zumsa with six companies of infantry, 100 Cossacks, hunters and artillery. Alibek tried to block his way, but he broke through. Uma managed to fight back, but was wounded.

On 17–18 August, Uma with 300 rebels advanced to the villages on the Bass River. On 25–27 August, with his rebels, he took part in the battles on the Bass River with the detachments of Ataman Smekalov, who subordinated two battalions of the Kurins and Apsherons infantry regiments, three hundreds of the Sunzhens Cossack regiment, seven mountain guns, Ingush hundred, and three hundreds of Dagestan mounted police and foot squads. On 28 August, together with Lorsa-Khadzhi, he participated in the battles near the village of Elistanzhi.

With Uma-Khadzhi was his eldest son Tutakay, while the younger Dada was among the officers, but then he went over to the side of the rebels when he realized that his father and brother were not going to retreat. In early October, in Chechnya, the army was getting closer and closer to the instigators of the rebellion. The uprising continued already in Dagestan, Alibek-Khadzhi, Uma-Khadzhi and their associates moved there. Uma-Khadzhi takes part in the battles near the villages of Gogotl and Agvali. At the end, the rebels took refuge in the fortress of the village of Sogratl.

"Uma showed himself to be a real king — a lord during the battles, a person so reliable for the participants of the battles, as if he were a real castle; a person with a firm hand in battles and wars"

— Chronicler Abdurazak Sogratlinsky. 19th century

== Death ==
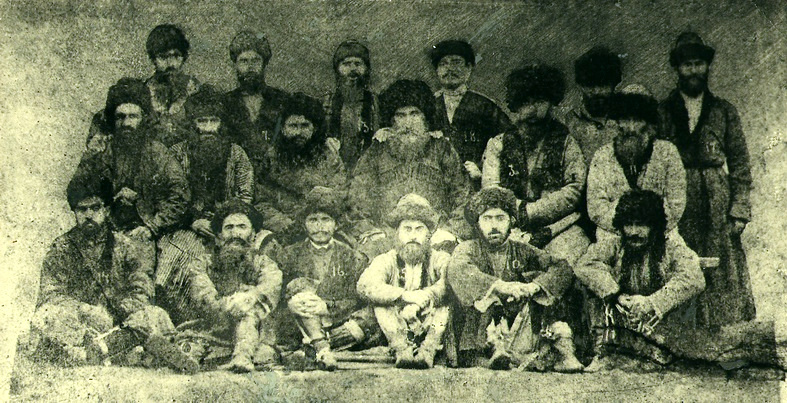
Photo taken in the Groznaya fortress after the verdict read out by the court-martial in December 1877. In the center is Uma-Khadzhi, to the right of him is Alibek-Khadzhi

During the assault on the fortress, Uma was badly wounded in the shoulder, as well as his son Tutakai, who would later die. After a second assault, on 3 November at 8 o'clock in the morning, the Sogratli collaborators arrived at the Russians with an expression of humility. They seized and handed over their leaders to the Russians: Muhammad-Khadzhi Sogratli, his father Sheikh Abdurakhman-Khadzhi, Abdul-Mejid Kumukh, Abbas Pasha, Umma-Khadzhi Duev, Dada Umaev, Dada Zalmaev. Alibek-Khadzhi managed to escape from the encirclement and return to Chechnya.

On 4–6 March 1878, a court-martial was held in Grozny. Twelve out of 17 people were sentenced to death by hanging: imam Alibek-Khadzhi Aldamov, Nurkhadi, Kosum, Hussein-Khadzhi from Aiti-Mokhk, Gazurko, Guba-khan, Kurko, Lorsa-Khadzhi, Mitta, Dada Zalmaev, Umma-Khadzhi Duev and his son Dada.
