= Roman Kutuzov (general) =

Russian major general (1969–2022)

- Роман Владимирович Кутузов
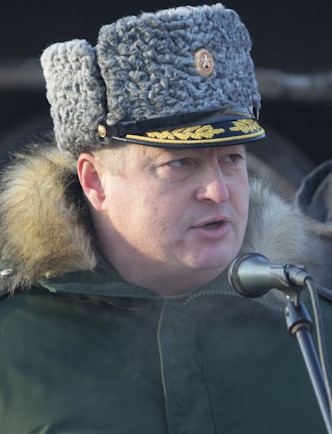
- Kutuzov in Chita, Zabaykalsky Krai, 2019
- Born: Roman Vladimirovich Kutuzov; 16 February 1969; Vladimir, Vladimir Oblast, Soviet Union
- Died: 5 June 2022 (aged 53); Mykolaivka, Luhansk Oblast, Ukraine
- Burial place: Federal Military Memorial Cemetery
- Military career
- Allegiance: Russia
- Service years: 1990–2022
- Rank: Lieutenant general
- Commands: Acting commander of the 5th Combined Arms Army (2017); Interim commander of the 29th Combined Arms Army (2019)
- Conflicts: Russo-Ukrainian War; Russian invasion of Ukraine; Eastern Ukraine offensive; Battle of Sievierodonetsk †
- Awards: Hero of the Russian Federation

Roman Vladimirovich Kutuzov (Russian: Роман Владимирович Кутузов; 16 February 1969 – 5 June 2022) was a Russian lieutenant general who was killed during the Russian invasion of Ukraine.

== Biography ==
When Kutuzov was a colonel, he commanded the 38th Separate Communications Regiment of the Russian Airborne Forces (military unit 54164).

In 2017, Kutuzov was the acting commander of the 5th Combined Arms Army. In 2019, he was interim commander of the 29th Combined Arms Army. In 2020, Kutuzov was the chief of staff of the 29th Combined Arms Army.

In early 2022, he was appointed Chief of Staff and First Deputy Commander of the 8th Combined Arms Army of the Southern Military District.

Kutuzov was killed on 5 June 2022 in the village of Mykolaivka, during the battle for Sievierodonetsk–Lysychansk near Lysychansk, Ukraine, while commanding the 1st Army Corps of the Donetsk People's Republic. Reports of his death originated on Russian milblogger Telegram channels and were later confirmed by Russian state media. He was buried in the Federal Military Memorial Cemetery on 7 June 2022.

Kutuzov's promotion to lieutenant general was announced posthumously.

== Awards and Decorations ==
- Hero of the Russian Federation
- Order "For Merit to the Fatherland"
- Order of Honour
- Order of Kutuzov
- Order of Courage
- Order of Military Merit
- Medal "For Courage"

== See also ==
- List of Russian generals killed during the Russian invasion of Ukraine

Military offices
Unknown	Commander of the Donetsk 1st Army Corps ?–2022	Unknown
Preceded by Valery Asapov	Commander of the 5th Combined Arms Army; 2017–2018	Succeeded by Oleg Tsekov
Preceded by Valery Nikolaevich Sineshchekov	Commander of the 38th Guards Communications Brigade; 2002–2010	Succeeded by Alexander Vladimirovich Grechkov
