= Benoyn Boyshar =

North Caucasian general (1794–1861)

Boysghar Beno
- Бенойн БойсгӀар, Benoyŋ Boysġar
- Born: 1794; Benoy, Chechnya
- Died: March 3, 1861 (aged 66–67); Khasavyurt, Russian Empire
- Burial place: Yaryksu-Auh
- Military career
- Allegiance: Caucasian Imamate; Chechnya
- Branch: Army
- Service years: 1817–1861
- Rank: Marshal General (1840–1859); Imam of Chechnya (1859–1861)
- Nickname: "Tash Stag" (Man of Stone)
- Conflicts: Caucasian War: Revolt in Chechnya (1860–1861)

Boysghar Beno, also known as Baysangur of Beno or simply Baysangur (Chechen: Бенойн Бойсгlар, Benoyŋ Boysġar; 1794 – 3 March 1861), was a 19th-century North Caucasian commander of Chechen origin. He was one of the naibs (deputies) of Imam Shamil. Baysangur participated in the Caucasian War of 1817–1861.

== Biography ==
Boyshar Benoev (born c. 1794) was a Chechen leader from the Benoy teip of the Edi Nek’e clan. He was born in the aul of Benoy and played a role in the resistance against Russian expansion in the North Caucasus. In 1825–1826, Boyshar participated in the uprising led by Beibulat Taimiev against Russian forces. In 1828, following the proclamation of Ghazi Muhammad as the first imam of the Caucasian Imamate, Boyshar joined his movement. His native Benoy became a stronghold for Ghazi Muhammad in Chechnya. In 1839, after the siege of Akhoulgo, Boyshar’s family provided refuge to Imam Shamil and his murids, who had escaped the battle.

== Naib of Imam Shamil ==
By 1846, during a battle with the Russian troops of Count Mikhail Vorontsov, Boyshar lost an arm and an eye, and in 1847, in the battle for Gergebil, his leg was blown off by a cannonball. As a result of this serious injury, he was captured by the tsarist troops, although he was rescued by Shamil's murids, who attacked the convoy that was transporting Baysungur to the fortress of Grozny. According to popular legends, he was tied to a horse so that he could stay in the saddle.

On May 8, 1860, Boyshar and former naibs of Shamil Uma Duyev and Atabi Atayev raised a new uprising in Chechnya. In June of the same year Boyshar's men defeated Russian forces led by General Musa Kundukhov near the town Fachu. Atabi Atayev's rebels thwarted attempts to strengthen the forces of Russian commander Nikolay Yevdokimov, and Duyev's forces freed the villages of the Argun Gorge from Russian control. The total strength of the rebel forces at that time reached 1,500. In November, they fought against eight hundred cossacks, 9 infantry battalions, and four rifle companies.

Boyshar's zeal and courage was noted by Imam Shamil in the diary of his bailiff Colonel A. I. Runovsky:

After a good dinner, when the younger members of the imam's large family left the dining room, the eldest of Shamil's sons, Gazi-Muhammad, who had recently returned from Temir-Khan-Shura, began to tell the latest news from the Caucasus. At the end of the conversation, Gazi-Muhammad mentioned a small episode related to the indomitable Chechen naib Boyshar from Benoi, who, even after the surrender of Imam Shamil, did not stop resistance and did not lay down his arms, continuing the fight along with his other brothers in arms, now former Chechen naibs of Shamil — Uma Duyev and Atabi Atayev.

Adjutant wing Colonel Chertkov sent negotiators on behalf of the Russian command to Boyshar with a proposal to surrender, - said Gazi-Muhammad. Boyshar met the negotiators in the woods near the old cemetery. In response to a tempting offer to save his life, the one-eyed, one-armed and one-legged sixty-six-year-old warrior pointed to the nearest graves in the cemetery and said with a grin: "Talk to them about your case - they will hear you better than me."

Shamil, who was attentively listening to his son's story, said thoughtfully: "Yes, this is such a person, I know him well, he would never change his word ..." For a moment, the former imam thought he heard the howling of wolves from the very depths of the dense Chechen forests. And as if shaking off this obsession, he resolutely added: "But, however, he wants nothing more than to die fighting against the infidels."

— Andrey Zakharovich Runovskiy, Diary of Colonel Runovsky

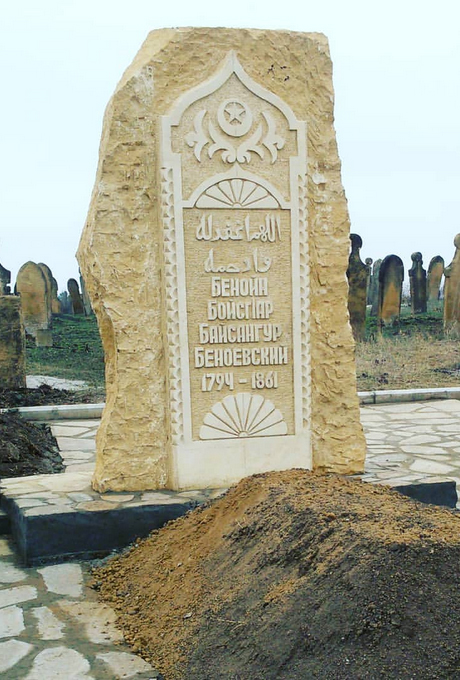
The tomb of Boyshar

== Death ==
Alarmed by the uprising of Boyshar, the Russian Army decided to take immediate action. With assistance from Musa Kundukhov, Nikolai Kolovachyov and Artsu Chermoyev, the Russian Army started to round up around the village of Belgatoy thanks for earlier intelligence information of Boyshar's location. Kundukhov used brute force and extreme brutality to crush every Chechen villages remaining, destroying 15 villages in total. Losing their hideout, Boyshar and his men returned to Benoy and tried to continue the resistance, but it was eventually crushed and they were captured.

Boyshar was imprisoned in Khasavyurt and was later sentenced to death by hanging by authority of Major General Pavel Kempert. He was hanged on March 1, 1861.

Since his death, the story of his famed last stand against Russian Army has been popular among Chechens as an example of Chechen heroism.

== Memory and image in popular culture ==
- There are streets named after Boyshar Benoyn in a number of settlements of the Chechen Republic and Dagestan.
- Boyshar is a character in the 1972 historical novel by Abuzar Aydamirov "Long Nights".
- The song "Gunib" (1991) by Imam Alimsultanov is dedicated to the defense of Gunib and the participation of Boyshar Benoyn in these events.
- Chechen bard Timur Mutsurayev dedicated his 1997 song "Boyshar" to the Chechen commander, as well as the song "Gunib" (1998) about the defense of Gunib, in which Boyshar appears.
- In October 2023, the head of Chechnya, Ramzan Kadyrov, announced the creation of a battalion named after Boyshar Benoyn within the structure of the Russian Guard. The number of units is 300 people.
