= Hero of the Russian Federation =

Highest honorary title of Russia

Honorary title Hero of the Russian Federation
- Obverse of the Gold Hero of the Russian Federation
- Type: Honorary title
- Awarded for: Extraordinary service to the state
- Presented by: the Russian Federation
- Eligibility: Russian citizens and foreign nationals
- Status: Active
- Established: 20 March 1992
- First award: 11 April 1992

Precedence
- Next (lower): Order of St Andrew
- Related: Order of the Red Star; Hero of the Soviet Union; Hero of Labour of the Russian Federation; Hero of Ukraine; Hero of Belarus; Hero of Kazakhstan; Hero of the Chechen Republic; Hero of the Donetsk People's Republic; Hero of the Luhansk People's Republic; Hero of Uzbekistan

Hero of the Russian Federation (Russian: Герой Российской Федерации, romanized: Geroy Rossiyskoy Federatsii, Russian pronunciation: [ɡʲɪˈroj rɐˈsʲijskəj fʲɪdʲɪˈratsɨɪ]), also unofficially called Hero of Russia (Russian: Герой России, romanized: Geroy Rossii, Russian pronunciation: [ɡʲɪˈroj rɐˈsʲiɪ]), is the highest honorary title of the Russian Federation. The title has a Gold Star medal, an insignia of honour that identifies recipients.

The title is awarded to persons for "service to the Russian state and nation, usually connected with a heroic feat of valour". The title is bestowed by decree of the president of the Russian Federation. Russian citizenship or being in the service of the Russian state is not obligatory.

The title was established in 1992 and, as of 2015, was awarded more than 970 times, of which more than 440 were posthumously.

== History ==
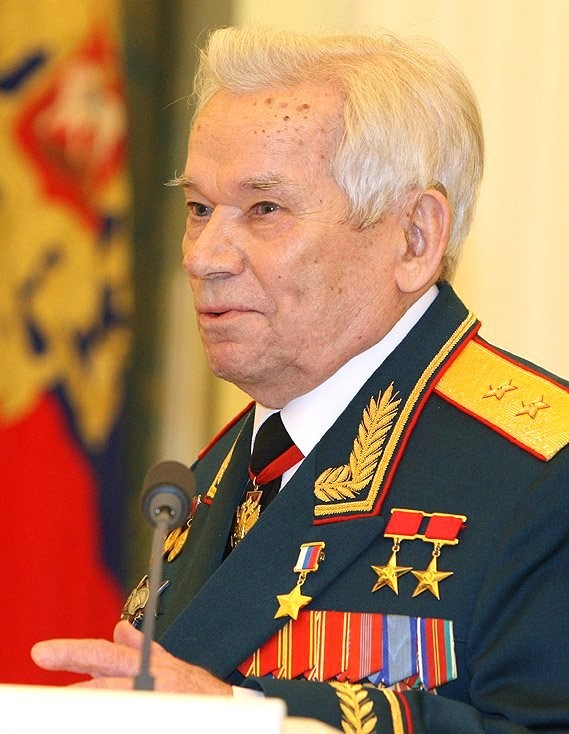
Mikhail Kalashnikov, World War II veteran and designer of Kalashnikov rifles, wears the Gold Star of Hero of the Russian Federation and two Stars of Hero of Socialist Labour

The title "Hero of Russia" is a successor to Hero of the Soviet Union (Russian: Герой Советского Союза, romanized: Geroy Sovetskogo Soyuza), which was established by Resolution of the Central Executive Committee of the Soviet Union of 5 May 1934. The corresponding Gold Star is derived from the Soviet design, created by architect Miron Merzhanov and approved by Decree of the Presidium of the Supreme Soviet of 1 August 1939, and the ribbon was updated from the Soviet flag colors to the colors of the Russian flag.

Following the dissolution of the Soviet Union in 1991, Russian Federation under president Boris Yeltsin retained a modified award by Law of the Russian Federation No. 2553-1 20 March 1992. Article 71 of the Constitution of Russia permits titles, orders and medals to be presented by the government, and Article 89 gives the Russian president power to create state awards. This is the highest honour that can be presented by the Russian president to a citizen.

== Statute ==
The title of Hero of the Russian Federation can be awarded for a heroic deed in the service of the state. It can be awarded to both civilian and military personnel. The title can also be awarded posthumously if the heroic act costs the recipient his or her life. The President of the Russian Federation is the main conferring authority of the award.

== Description ==
The insignia of the title of "Hero of the Russian Federation" is also called the "Gold Star" medal (Russian: медаль "Золотая Звезда", romanized: medal "Zolotaya zvezda"), its design is similar to the Soviet variant.

The "Gold Star" medal is a gold five-pointed star with smooth 15mm dihedral rays on the obverse. The otherwise plain reverse bears the prominent relief inscription in 2mm high letters "HERO OF RUSSIA" (Russian: "ГЕРОЙ РОССИИ") at its centre, in the upper portion, the award serial number in 1mm high numbers.

The insignia is secured to a standard Russian square mount by a ring through the suspension loop. The mount is covered by a silk moiré tricolour ribbon of white, blue, and red.

The insignia of Hero of the Russian Federation is worn on the left side of the chest above all other medals and decorations. It is always worn in full size; there is no ribbon bar or rosette that can be worn in lieu of the medal. When worn together with Soviet-era hero titles (Hero of the Soviet Union, Hero of Socialist Labour), the Russian title has precedence.

== Recipients ==
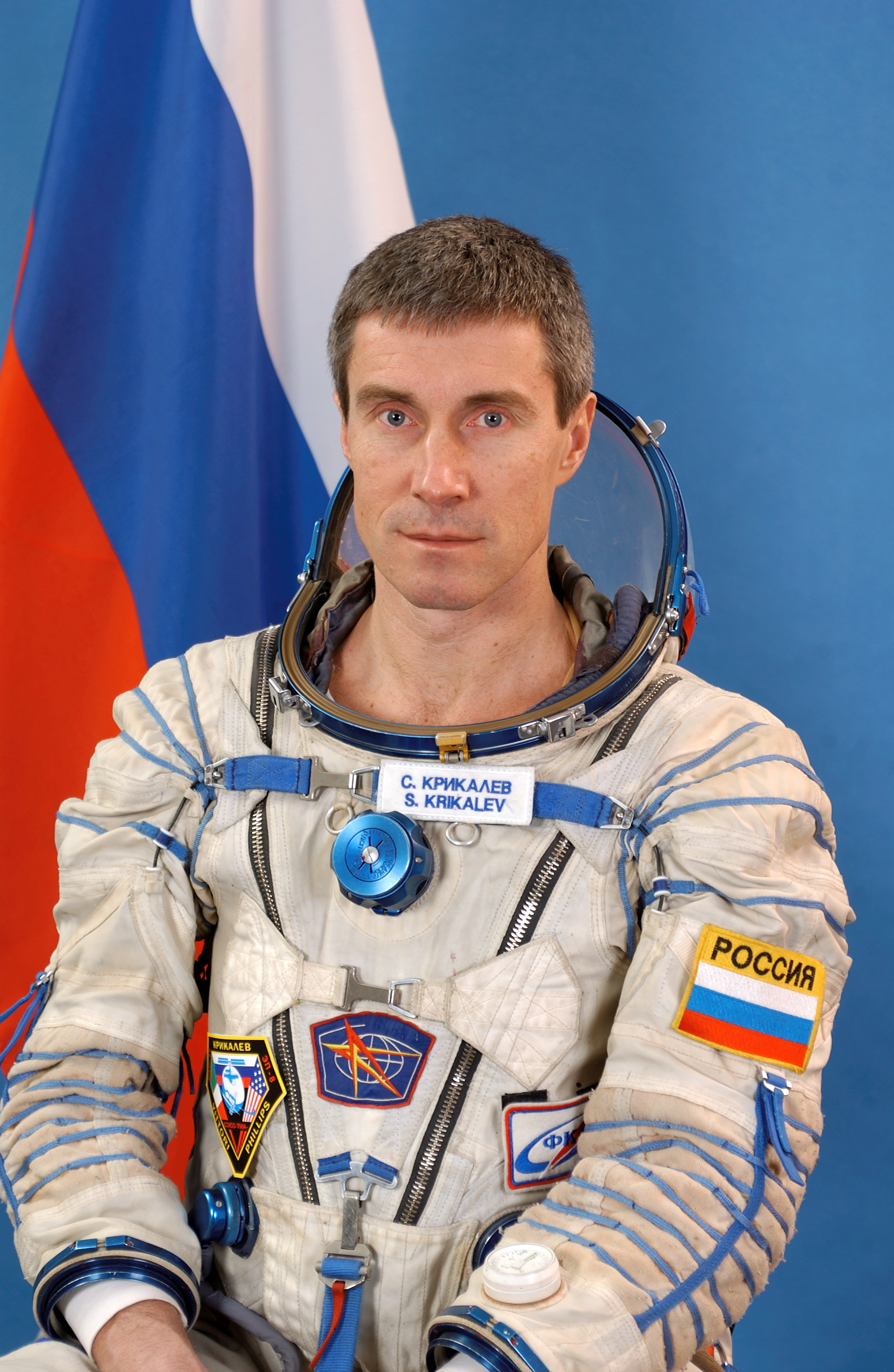
Cosmonaut Sergei Krikalev in 1992 became the first recipient of the title for outstanding service at the Mir space station

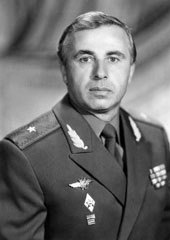
Major-General Sulom-Bek Oskanov became the first posthumous recipient of the title in 1992

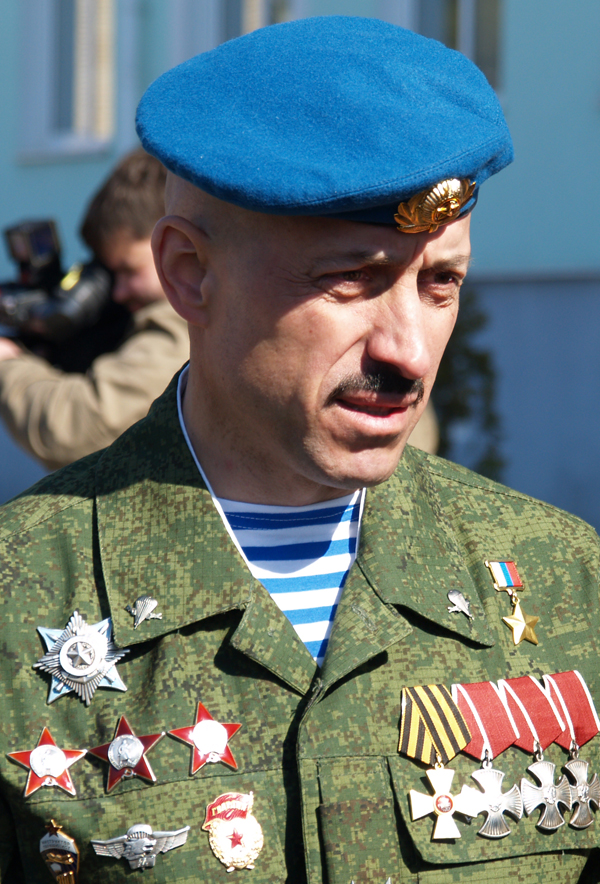
Guards Lieutenant Colonel Anatoly Lebed, awarded in 2005 "for courage and heroism in the performance of military duties in the North Caucasus".

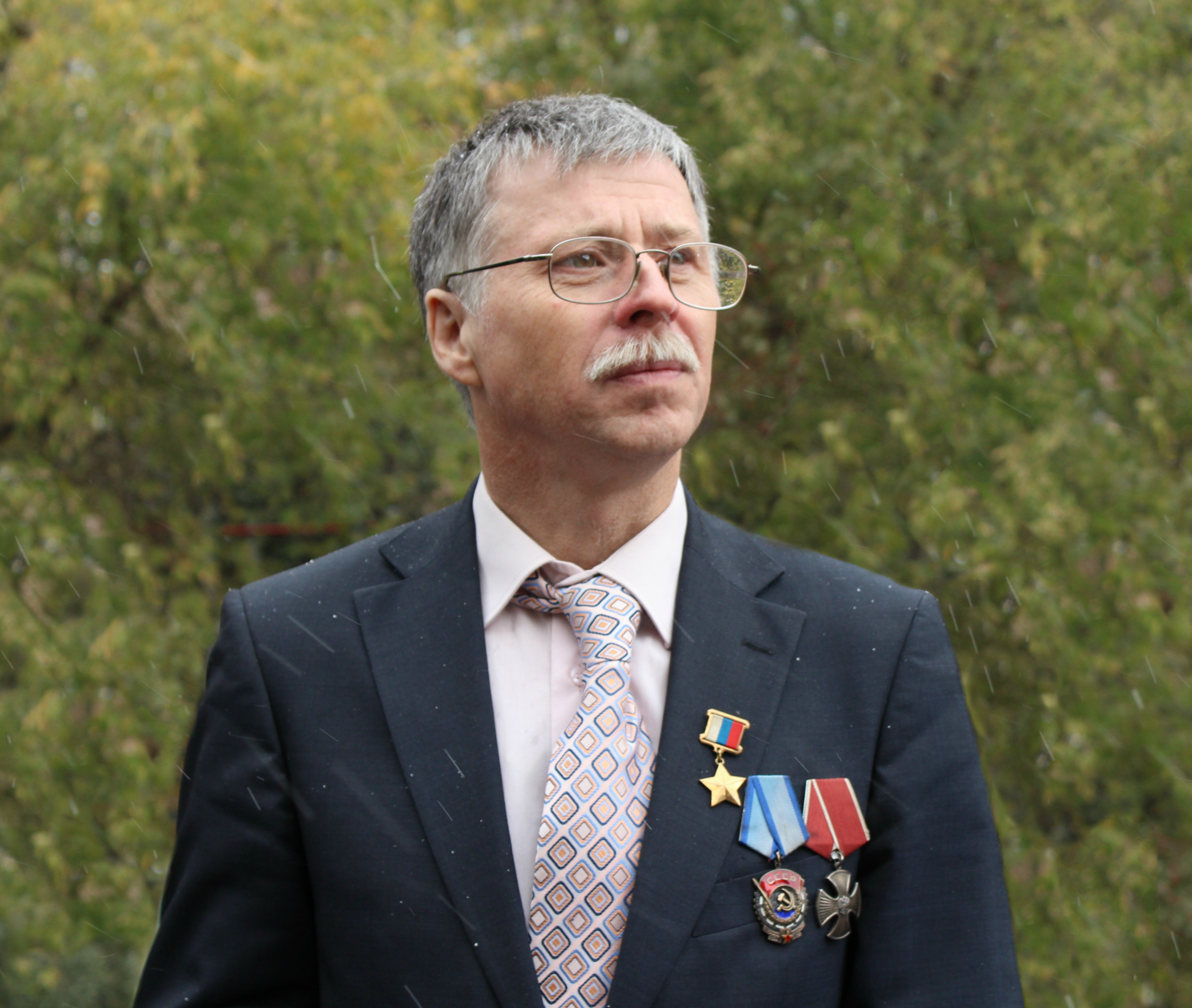
Arktika 2007 expedition member Yevgeny Chernyaev

The majority of the early recipients of the title fell into two categories: participants in the Chechnya conflicts or cosmonauts. On some occasions, the person who was awarded the title was killed while in the course of duty, such as Major Denis Vetchinov, who was killed early in the 2008 South Ossetia War. This includes those killed in battle as well as assassinated government officials. An example of such a recipient was Akhmad Kadyrov, the former governor of Chechnya. The pro-Moscow leader was killed in a bomb attack during the 2004 Victory Day parade in the Chechen capital of Grozny. Several days after Akhmad was killed, President Vladimir Putin awarded him the title. Some time after the incident, Putin awarded Kadyrov's son, Ramzan, the same title for his work in Chechnya.

All Russian cosmonauts are awarded the title of Hero of the Russian Federation following their voyage into space; some may already have earned it, for example for long service as a test pilot. Cosmonauts are also awarded the title Pilot-Cosmonaut of the Russian Federation. Some recipients of the title, such as Sergei Krikalev, had also received the Soviet hero title, along with the Order of Lenin. Most of the cosmonaut double heroes were awarded the Hero of the Soviet Union and Hero of Russia titles "for successful realization of flight and the courage and heroism shown."

Outside those two groups, athletes and other civilian and military officials have also received the title. Notable examples include:

- Submarine captain Gennady Lyachin, of the Kursk, which sank after an explosion in 2000. Due to his heroism during the explosion and his attempts at preserving the lives of the crew, Lyachin was posthumously awarded the title, and the members of his crew were awarded the Order of Courage.
- Athlete Larisa Lazutina was presented with the title for various medals won at the 1998 Winter Olympics in Nagano, Japan.
- Alexander Karelin was awarded for his recognition as the greatest wrestler of all time (from antiquity to the present day). He was a Greco-Roman wrestler in the Olympics, and in his career he won 887 bouts and lost only 2 times. His losses are controversial because commentators believe they were caused by trivial rule changes, not a bona fide athletic defeat.
- Arktika 2007 expedition members Anatoly Sagalevich, Yevgeny Chernyaev and Artur Chilingarov, who on 10 January 2008, performed the first ever descent to the ocean bottom at the North Pole. Awarded the title "for courage and heroism showed in extreme conditions and successful completion of high-latitude Arctic deep-water expedition."
- Weapons designer Mikhail T. Kalashnikov, designer of the AK-47 assault rifle and PK machine gun. He received the honour on his 90th birthday, 10 November 2009.

On 16 August 2009, the Russian Air Force's aerobatics demonstration team, Russian Knights' commander, Guard Colonel Igor Tkachenko was killed when his Sukhoi Su-27 collided in mid-air with another Sukhoi Su-27 whilst practicing for the 2009 MAKS Airshow. He was awarded the title of Hero of the Russian Federation posthumously on 22 August 2009.

The medal has been awarded posthumously approximately 340 times, primarily to people involved in the first and second wars in Chechnya. In 2010 a posthumous award was made by President Dmitry Medvedev to Evgeny Chernyshov, the chief of the Moscow fire department on 24 March 2010. Chernyshov died on 20 March 2010 saving others' lives.

On 28 March 2012, during a training exercise at a Far Eastern military base near the town of Belogorsk, Major Sergei Solnechnikov pushed a soldier away from an unsuccessfully thrown grenade and covered the grenade with his own body after it bounced back into the trench they were in with dozens of soldiers standing nearby. He was awarded the title of Hero of the Russian Federation posthumously the following day on 29 March.

In February 2014, Colonel Alexander Popov who was commander of a detachment of Russian Spetsnaz took part in the annexation of Crimea by the Russian Federation. On 4 April 2014 in a ("closed") decree of the President of the Russian Federation, he was awarded the title of Hero of the Russian Federation for "courage and heroism displayed in the performance of military duty."

On 24 November 2015, a Turkish Air Force F-16 shot down a Sukhoi Su-24 which Turkey claimed had violated its airspace. Lieutenant Colonel Oleg Peshkov and Major Konstantin Murakhtin ejected successfully from the aircraft but they were exposed to ground fire and Peshkov died as a result. Murakhtin was rescued safely later. On 25 November, President Vladimir Putin awarded the Hero of Russia posthumously to Peshkov and Murakhtin was awarded with the Order of Courage.

On 17 March 2016, Senior Lieutenant Alexander Prokhorenko was the pilot of a Sukhoi Su-25 ground attack aircraft shot down during Palmyra offensive of the Syrian Civil War. During his last moments, he was allegedly surrounded on all sides by ISIS fighters and he decided to order an airstrike at his own position, killing himself and all of the approaching fighters. Before he died, he called the commander: "They are outside, conduct the airstrike now please hurry, this is the end, tell my family I love them and I died fighting for my motherland. Unable command, I am surrounded, they are outside, I don't want them to take me and parade me, conduct the airstrike, they will make a mockery of me and this uniform. I want to die with dignity and take all these bastards with me. Please my last wish, conduct the airstrike, they will kill me either way. They [are] outside, this is the end commander, thank you, tell my family and my country I love them. Tell them I was brave and I fought until I could no longer. Please take care of my family, avenge my death, good bye commander, tell my family I love them!". On 11 April 2016, President Vladimir Putin declared Prokhorenko a Hero of the Russian Federation, the highest Russian honor.

On 10 July 2016, Police Lieutenant Magomed Nurbagandov from Dagestan was captured by Islamic militants. With the whole incident videotaped by the militants, they demanded that Nurbagandov and his colleagues resign from the police force, but he defied them and said to the camera "Keep on working, brothers!" before being shot dead. On 22 September 2016, President Putin praised the officer as a model for others and awarded the Hero of Russia posthumously to Nurbagandov which was handed to his parents.

On 10 May 2017, Russian President Vladimir Putin personally awarded medals to four officers of the Special Operations Forces for showing extraordinary courage combating terrorists in Syria. They were part of a 16-man special forces detachment unit which managed to successfully repulse attacks conducted by over 300 jihadists without any losses. The commander of the unit, Lieutenant Colonel Danilo was awarded the honorary title of Hero of the Russian Federation.

On 3 February 2018, Major Roman Filipov was the pilot of a Sukhoi Su-25 ground attack aircraft that was shot down by Syrian militants belonging to the al-Nusra Front. Filipov successfully ejected but landed in a rebel-controlled area and fought a gun battle against militants. He shouted "This is for our guys!" and set off a hand grenade as 10 militants approached him. On 6 February 2018, President Vladimir Putin signed an executive order awarding Major Roman Filipov the title of Hero of the Russian Federation.

On 15 August 2019, Ural Airlines Flight 178 crash landed in a cornfield shortly after takeoff. With the successful emergency landing, the airline praised the professionalism of the pilots. The pilot in command Damir Yusupov and the first officer Georgy Murzin were awarded the honorary title of Hero of the Russian Federation; the rest of the crew were decorated with the Order of Courage.

In December 2020, according to the Russian Defense Ministry, 1st Captain Dmitry Maslov of the Russian Navy's Northern Fleet was awarded the title of Hero of the Russian Federation "for the performance of special tasks associated with the risk to life during one of the long voyages."

In May 2021, by a "closed" decree of the President of the Russian Federation, Police Lieutenant Colonel Zamid Chalaev of the Ministry of Internal Affairs of Chechnya was awarded the title of Hero of the Russian Federation for courage and heroism shown in the line of duty.

On 5 June 2022, Roman Kutuzov was killed in the village of Mykolaivka, during the battle for Sievierodonetsk–Lysychansk near Lysychansk, Ukraine, while commanding the 1st Army Corps of the Donetsk People's Republic. Reports of his death originated on Russian milblogger Telegram channels and were later confirmed by Russian state media. He was buried in the Federal Military Memorial Cemetery on 7 June 2022. Kutuzov's promotion to lieutenant general was announced posthumously, and he was awarded the Hero of the Russian Federation award alongside his other medals.

== See also ==
- Honorary titles of Russia
- Awards and decorations of the Russian Federation
- Awards and Emblems of the Ministry of Defense of the Russian Federation
- Awards of the Ministry of Internal Affairs of Russia
- Awards of the Federal Security Service of the Russian Federation
- Awards of the Federal Protective Service of the Russian Federation
- Awards of the Ministry for Emergency Situations of Russia
- Ministerial Awards of the Russian Federation
