= Mykolaivka, Sievierodonetsk Raion, Luhansk Oblast =

Mykolaivka Миколаївка
- Rural settlement
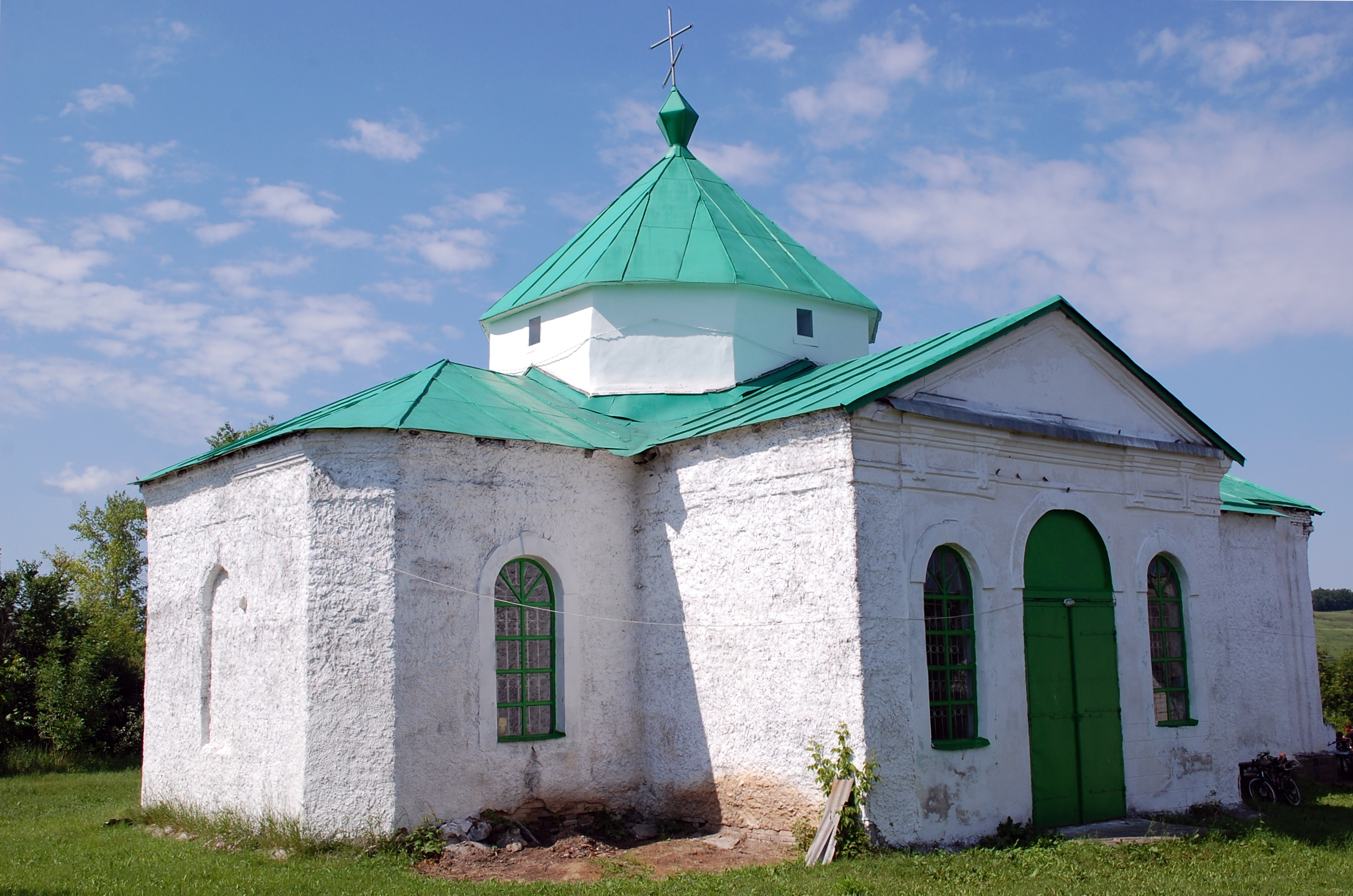
- Church of St. Nicholas
- Interactive map of Mykolaivka
- Location of Mykolaivka within Luhansk Oblast Location of Mukolaivka within Ukraine
- Coordinates: 48.771944°N 38.336389°E
- Country: Ukraine
- Oblast: Luhansk Oblast
- Raion: Sievierodonetsk Raion
- Hromada: Popasna urban hromada
- Founded: 1768

Area
  - Total: 4.906 km^{2} (1.894 sq mi)
- Elevation: 129 m (423 ft)

Population (2001 census)
  - Total: 403
  - Density: 82.1/km^{2} (213/sq mi)
- Time zone: UTC+2 (EET)
  - Summer (DST): UTC+3 (EEST)
- Postal code: 93330
- Area code: +380 6474

Mykolaivka (Ukrainian: Миколаївка, Russian: Николаевка) is a rural settlement in Sievierodonetsk Raion (district) in Luhansk Oblast of eastern Ukraine.

== Geography ==
Mykolaivka located at about 76 kilometres (47 mi) WNW from the centre of Luhansk city, at about 21 kilometres (13 mi) SW from Sievierodonetsk.

== Demographics ==
As of 2001 it had a population of 403 people. Native language as of the Ukrainian Census of 2001:

- Ukrainian — 87,1%
- Russian — 12,41%
- Other language — 0,49%

== Russo-Ukrainian War ==
The settlement came under attack by Russian forces during the Russian invasion of Ukraine in 2022. On 5 June of that year, the Russian general Roman Kutuzov was killed in Mykolaivka by Ukrainian forces.
