= June 2000 Chechnya suicide bombings =

2000 incident in Chechnya

- Part of Second Chechen War
- Location of Chechnya in Russia
- Location: Alkhan-Yurt, Chechnya, North Caucasian Federal District, Russia
- Date: 6 June 2000
- Attack type: suicide attack
- Weapon: car bomb
- Deaths: 2 – Russia claimed 27 – rebels claimed
- Injuries: 5

The June 2000 Chechnya suicide bombings were Chechnya's first suicide attacks with car bombs.

On 6 June 2000, the 17-year-old Khava Barayeva (relative of Arbi Barayev), accompanied by 16-year-old Luiza Magomadova, drove a truck loaded with explosives through a checkpoint of an OMON base at Alkhan-Yurt in Chechnya. Barayeva detonated her bomb outside the barracks, killing a number of paramilitary police troops (rebels claimed up to 27 were killed, but the Russians claimed only two were killed and five were injured).

Another suicide bombing, which killed two OMON troops at a checkpoint leading to the Khankala base, was carried five days later on June 11 by a former Russian prisoner of war Sergey Dimitriyev who had converted to Islam and joined the rebels while in captivity.

== Sources ==
- "Suicide Operations in Chechnya: An Escalation of the Islamist Struggle". Archived from the original on 3 February 2003.
