= Timur Aliev =

Chcechen journalist

- Born: September 18, 1973 (age 51); Grozny, Chechen-Ingush ASSR, Soviet Union
- Occupation(s): Journalist, editor-in-chief of The Chechen Society

Tamerlan Magomedovich Aliev, better known as Timur Aliev (Aliyev), (Chechen: Тамерлан Магомедович Алиев) (born September 18, 1973, in Grozny, Chechnya) is a prominent Chechen journalist and the former editor-in-chief of the Grozny-based publication The Chechen Society.

Aliev graduated from Grozny State Oil Institute in 1995.

He has written extensively on the First and Second Chechen Wars and the political situation in the North Caucasus, and has been published in newspaper of records such as Financial Times, The Moscow Times, The Daily Telegraph, and People magazine.

In 2008, Aliev left his job as a journalist to become employed as an assistant of the president of Chechnya Ramzan Kadyrov.
