= Nozhay-Yurt =

Village in Nozhay-Yurtovsky District, Russia

Coordinates: 43°06′N 46°23′E

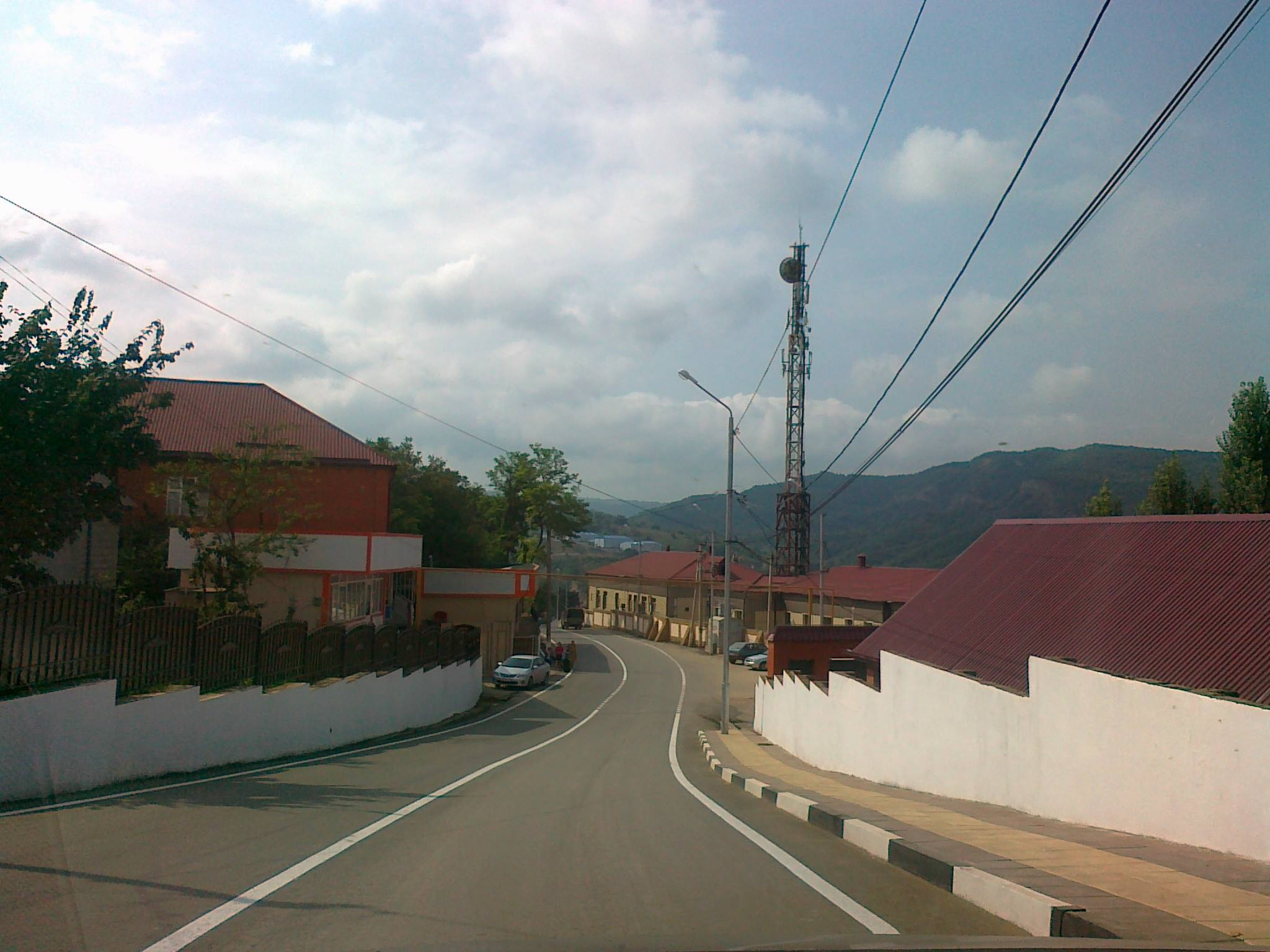
In Nozhay-Yurt

Nozhay-Yurt (Russian: Ножай-Юрт; Chechen: Нажи-Йурт, Naƶi-Yurt) is a rural locality (a selo) and the administrative center of Nozhay-Yurtovsky District of the Chechen Republic, Russia. Population: 6,744 (2010 census); 5,062 (2002 census); 4,388 (1989 Soviet census).
