= Nozhay-Yurtovsky District =

Nozhay-Yurtovsky District Ножай-Юртовский район (Russian)
- District

Other transcription(s)
  - Chechen: Нажи-Йуьртан кӀошт
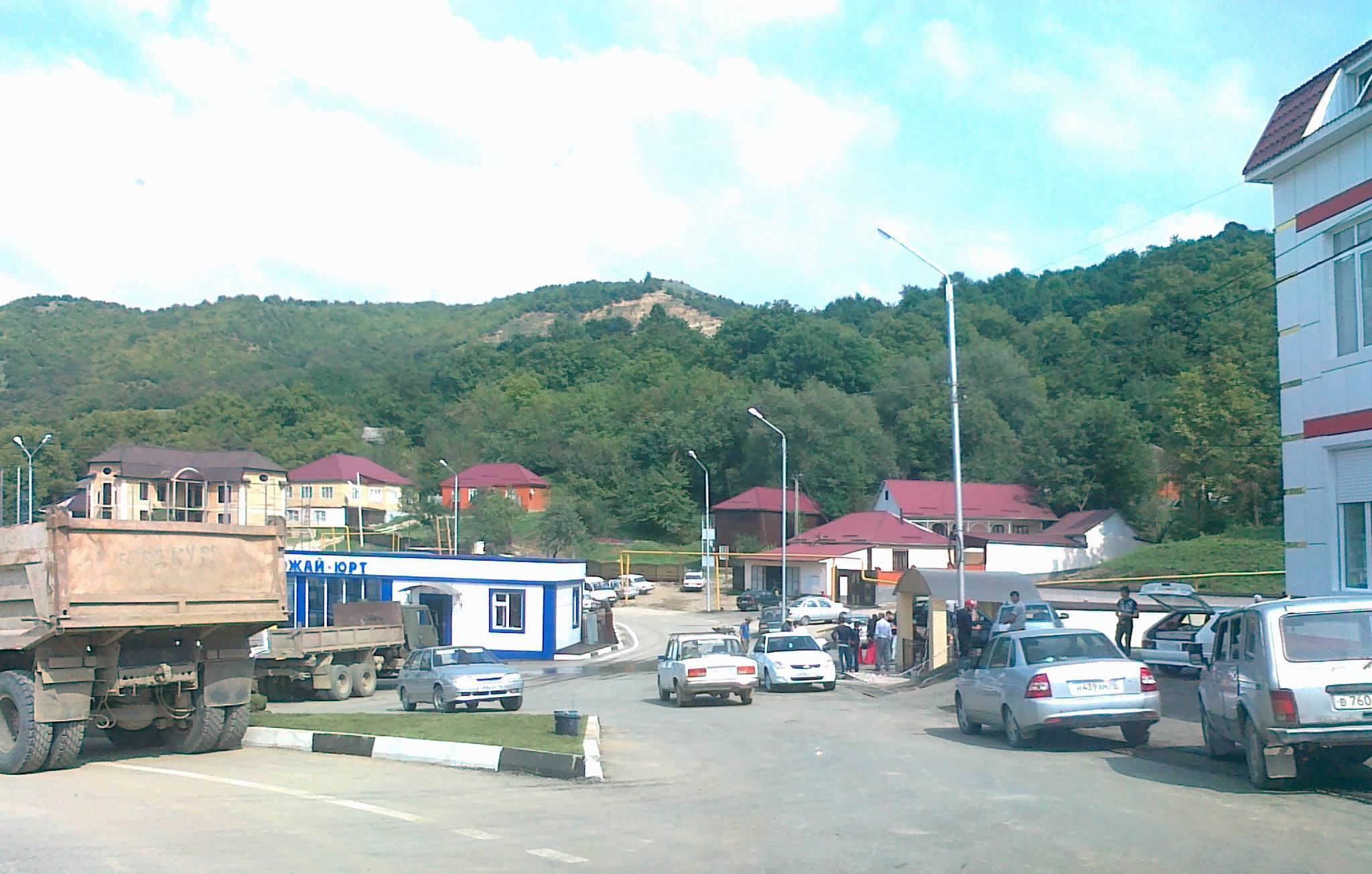
- Scene in Nozhay-Yurtovsky

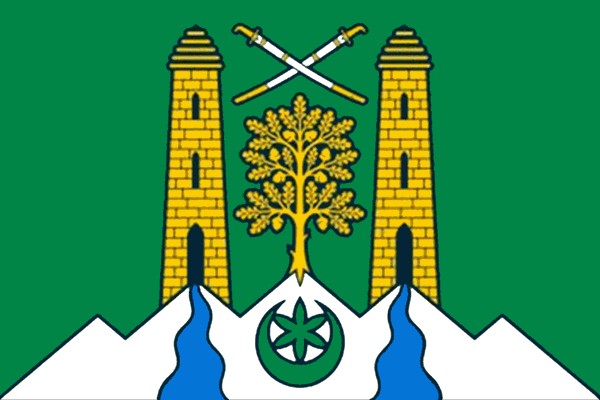
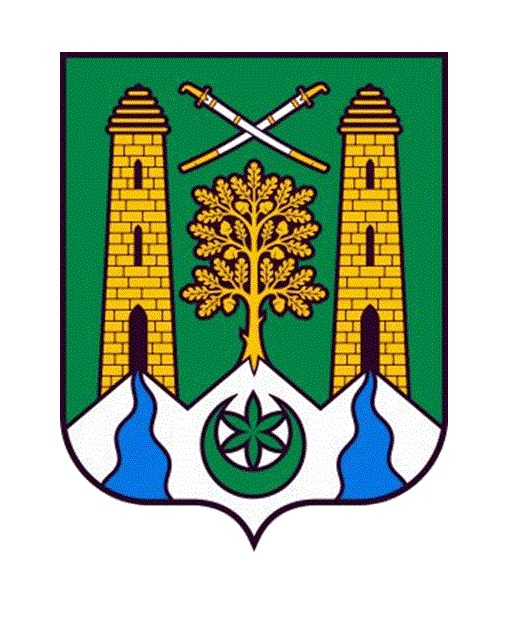
- Flag Coat of arms
- Location of Nozhay-Yurtovsky District in the Chechen Republic
- Coordinates: 43°05′45″N 46°22′35″E
- Country: Russia
- Federal subject: Chechen Republic
- Established: 30 March 1923
- Administrative center: Nozhay-Yurt

Area
  - Total: 629 km^{2} (243 sq mi)

Population (2010 Census)
  - Total: 49,445
  - Density: 78.6/km^{2} (204/sq mi)
  - Urban: 0%
  - Rural: 100%

Administrative structure
  - Administrative divisions: 22 rural administration
  - Inhabited localities: 53 rural localities

Municipal structure
  - Municipally incorporated as: Nozhay-Yurtovsky Municipal District
  - Municipal divisions: 0 urban settlements, 22 rural settlements
- Time zone: UTC+3 (MSK)
- OKTMO ID: 96625000
- Website: http://www.nojay-urt.ru/

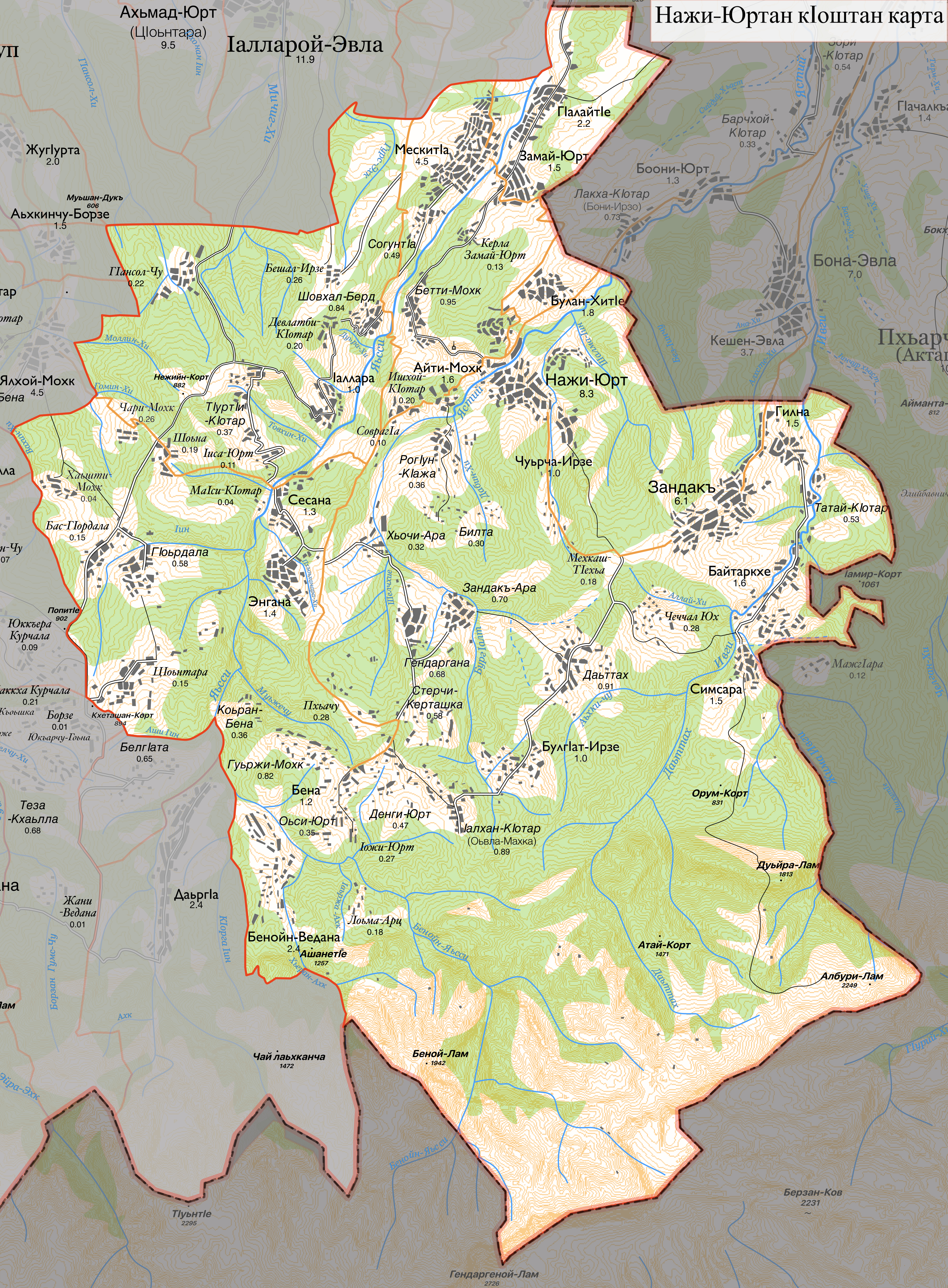
Map of the Nozhai-Yurt district (in Chechen)

Nozhay-Yurtovsky District (Russian: Ножа́й-Ю́ртовский райо́н; Chechen: Нажи-Йуьртан кӀошт, Naƶi-Yürtan khoşt) is an administrative and municipal district (raion), one of the fifteen in the Chechen Republic, Russia. It is located in the east of the republic. The area of the district is 629 square kilometers (243 sq mi). Its administrative center is the rural locality (a selo) of Nozhay-Yurt. Population: 49,445 (2010 census); 40,542 (2002 Census); 48,770 (1989 Soviet census). The population of Nozhay-Yurt accounts for 13.6% of the district's total population.

== Healthcare ==
Overall health performance indicators of the district are much worse than officially reflected, considering the remote geographic location of the district and that most of its populace has limited access to state health care. As of 2004, the mortality rates were among the highest in the republic.
