= Kurchaloy (teip) =

Chechen clan

Kurchaloy Курчалой
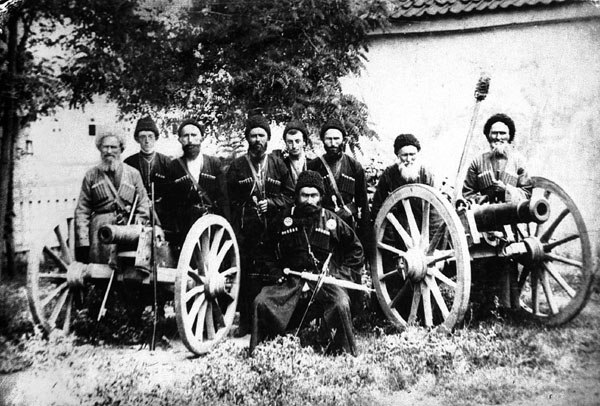
- Men of the teip Kurchaloy 19th-century

Total population
- 70,000

Regions with significant populations
- Russia: 60,000
- Chechnya: 50,000

Languages
- Chechen (Nokhchmakhkakhoy)

Religion
- Suni Islam

Kurchaloy (Chechen: Курчалой) is a Chechen teip (clan) from the historic region of Ichkeria and belongs to the tukkhum Nokhchmakhkakhoy, also called Ichkerians. The centre of the teip is the village Verkhny Kurchali, which is located in the Vedensky District.

== Geography ==
Members of the teip live all across the Chechen Republic and the Aukh region of today’s Dagestan. Some live in Jordan where the city of Zarqa was founded.

- Kurchaloy
- Shali
- Starye Atagi
- Novye Atagi
- Alkhan-Yurt
- Sredny Kurchali
- Nizhny Kurchali

== History ==
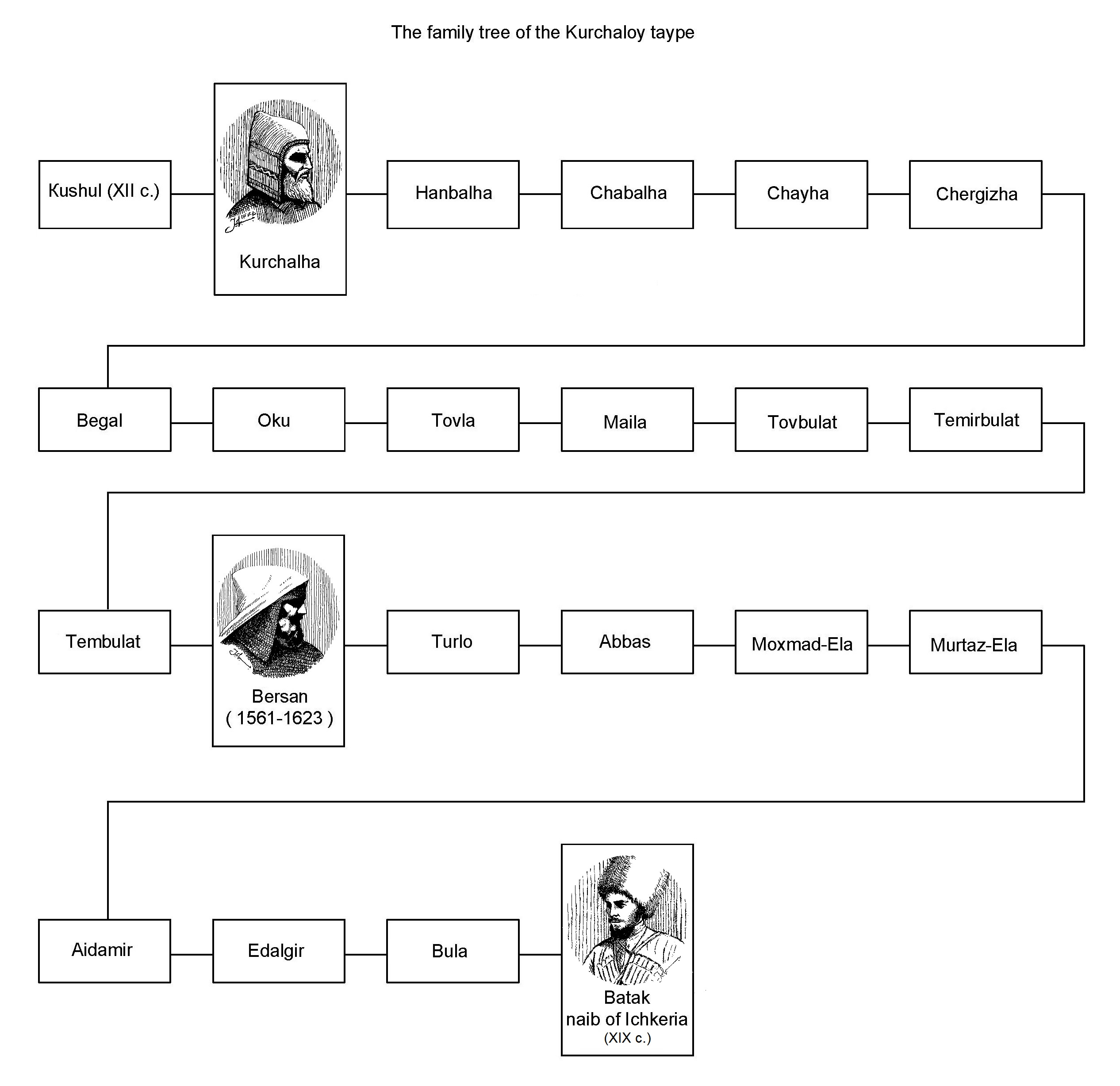
Family tree of Kurchaloy clan

The ancient village of Kurchal is located in the mountains of the Vedeno region, founded in the 13th century. The name of the Chechen teip Kurchaloy (teip) laid the basis for the name of the city of Kurchaloy and Kurchaloyevsky District.

In the Vedensky district there is a mountain peak Kurchaloy

== The family tree ==
Genealogical tree of the Kurchaloyans from Nashkh came Kushul. Kushul — Kurchalha (12th century) — Khanbilha — Chabalkha — Chaykha — Chergishkha — Begal — Oku — Tovla — Maila (Maig) — Tovbolat — Tembolat — Timirbolat — Bersa (the first preacher of Islam — 1561.) — Turlo — Abbas — Mokhmad-ela — Murtaz-ela — Aidamir — Edalgir — Bulun Botakh (naib in Ichkeria — 1858).

== Notable Kurchaloy ==
- Bersa Sheikh — preacher, religious figure sheikh.
- Talkhig of Shali — naib Imam Shamil.
- Tovbolat Kurchaloevsky — was a Chechen outlaw (abrek) and military figure who participated in the Caucasian War.
- Magomed Shataev — was a Chechen public figure of the Soviet period.

== Sources ==
- Suleimanov A. S. Toponymy of Chechnya / Ed. T. I. Buraeva. — Grozny: State Unitary Enterprise «Book Publishing House», 2006 — 711 p. — 5000 copies. — ISBN 5-98896-002-2
- Попко И. Д. Терские казаки со стародавних времён (Исторический очерк). — Вып. 1 — СПб.: Тип. Кулиша, 1880 — 518 с.
- Попов И. М. Предисловие // Сборник сведений о кавказских горцах: [рус. дореф.] = Сборникъ свѣдѣній о Кавказскихъ горцахъ : сб. в 4 вып. — Издаваемый с соизволения Е.И.В. Главнокомандующего Кавказскою Армией при Кавказском Горском Управлении. — Тифлис : Тип. Главного Управления Наместника Кавказского, 1870 — Вып. IV. — С. 13–14.
- Головлёв А. А. Очерки о Чечне (природа, население, новейшая история) : моногр. / Рецензент С. А. Прокопенко. — Ульяновск : Вектор-С, 2007 — 296 с. — 100 экз. — ББК 84-Ч. — УДК 911.2.551.4: 914.706(G). — ISBN 978-5-91308-014-1.
- Анзор Давлетукаев. Район, которым гордимся // Вести Республики. — 2014 — 02 19 (№ 32 (2215)).
- Усаев А-А. Историческое общество Курчалой // Вестник Академии наук Чеченской Республики. — 2020 — № 4 (51). — С. 46—50.
