= Regita =

Village in Kurchaloyevsky District, Russia

Coordinates: 43°05′45″N 46°07′40″E

Regita (Russian: Регита, Chechen: РегӀатӀа, Reġatha) is a village (selo) in Kurchaloyevsky District, Chechnya.

== Administrative and municipal status ==
Municipally, Regita is incorporated as Regitinskoye rural settlement. It is the administrative center of the municipality and is one of four settlements included in it.

== Geography ==
Map of Kurchaloyevsky District. Regita ("Регита") is in the south-west

Regita is located in the upper reaches of the Khumys River. It is 15 kilometres (9.3 mi) south-east of the town of Kurchaloy and is 55 kilometres (34 mi) south-east of the city of Grozny.

The nearest settlements to Regita are Belty and Khidi-Khutor in the north-east, Koren-Benoy in the east, Achereshki in the south-east, Guni in the south, Marzoy-Mokhk in the south-west, and Dzhaglargi in the north-west.

== History ==
In 1944, after the genocide and deportation of the Chechen and Ingush people and the Chechen-Ingush ASSR was abolished, the village of Regita was renamed, and settled by people from the neighbouring republic of Dagestan.

In 1958, after the Vaynakh people returned and the Chechen-Ingush ASSR was restored, the village regained its old Chechen name, Regita.

== Population ==
- 2002 Census: 685
- 2010 Census: 783
- 2018 estimate: ?

According to the 2010 Census, the majority of residents of Regita were ethnic Chechens.
