= Enikali =

Village in Kurchaloyevsky District, Russia

Coordinates: 43°04′25″N 46°09′20″E

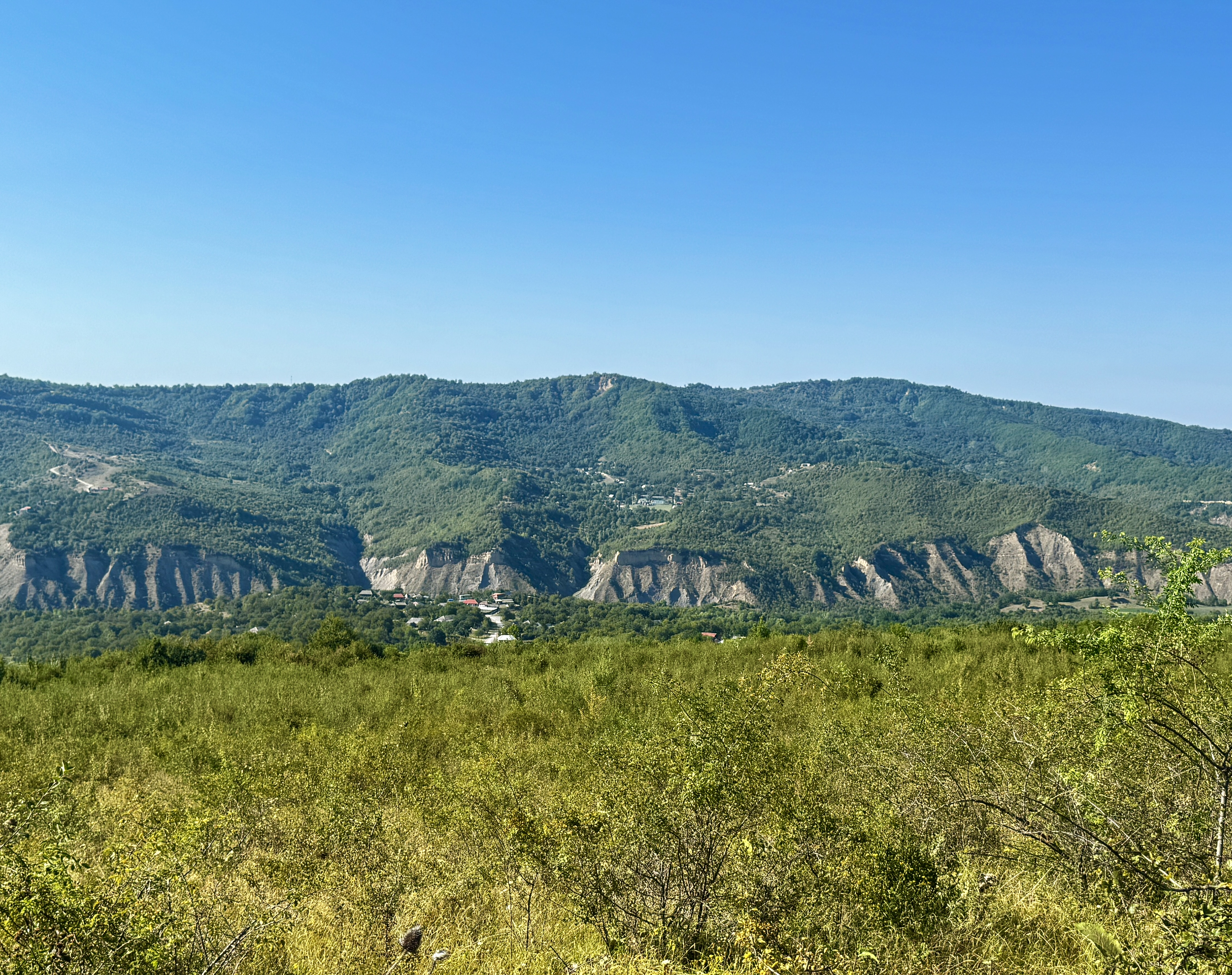
Enikali

Enikali (Russian: Эникали, Chechen: Энакхаьлла, Enaqälla) is a village (selo) in Kurchaloyevsky District, Chechnya.

== Administrative and municipal status ==
Municipally, Enikali is incorporated as Enikalinskoye rural settlement. It is the administrative center of the municipality and is one of the two settlements, and the only inhabited one, included in it.

== Geography ==
Map of Kurchaloyevsky District. Enikali ("Эникали") is in the south

Enikali is located on the right bank of the Gums River. It is 15 kilometres (9.3 mi) south-east of the town of Kurchaloy and is 47 kilometres (29 mi) south-east of the city of Grozny.

The nearest settlements to Enikali are Achereshki in the north-west, Koren-Benoy in the north, Yalkhoy-Mokhk and Belty in the north-east, Khashki-Mokhk in the east, Gezinchu and Sherdy-Mokhk in the south-east, and Guni in the south-west.

== History ==
In 1944, after the genocide and deportation of the Chechen and Ingush people and the Chechen-Ingush ASSR was abolished, the village of Enikali was renamed to Bezhta, and settled by people from the village of Bezhta in the neighbouring republic of Dagestan.

In 1958, after the Vaynakh people returned and the Chechen-Ingush ASSR was restored, the village regained its old Chechen name, Enikali.

== Population ==
- 2002 Census: 1,022
- 2010 Census: 1,130

According to the 2010 Census, the majority of residents of Enikali were ethnic Chechens.

The teip composition of the village includes the Enakaloy, Tsontaroy and Ersenoy.
