= Koren-Benoy, Kurchaloyevsky District =

Village in Kurchaloyevsky District, Russia

Coordinates: 43°05′24″N 46°08′46″E

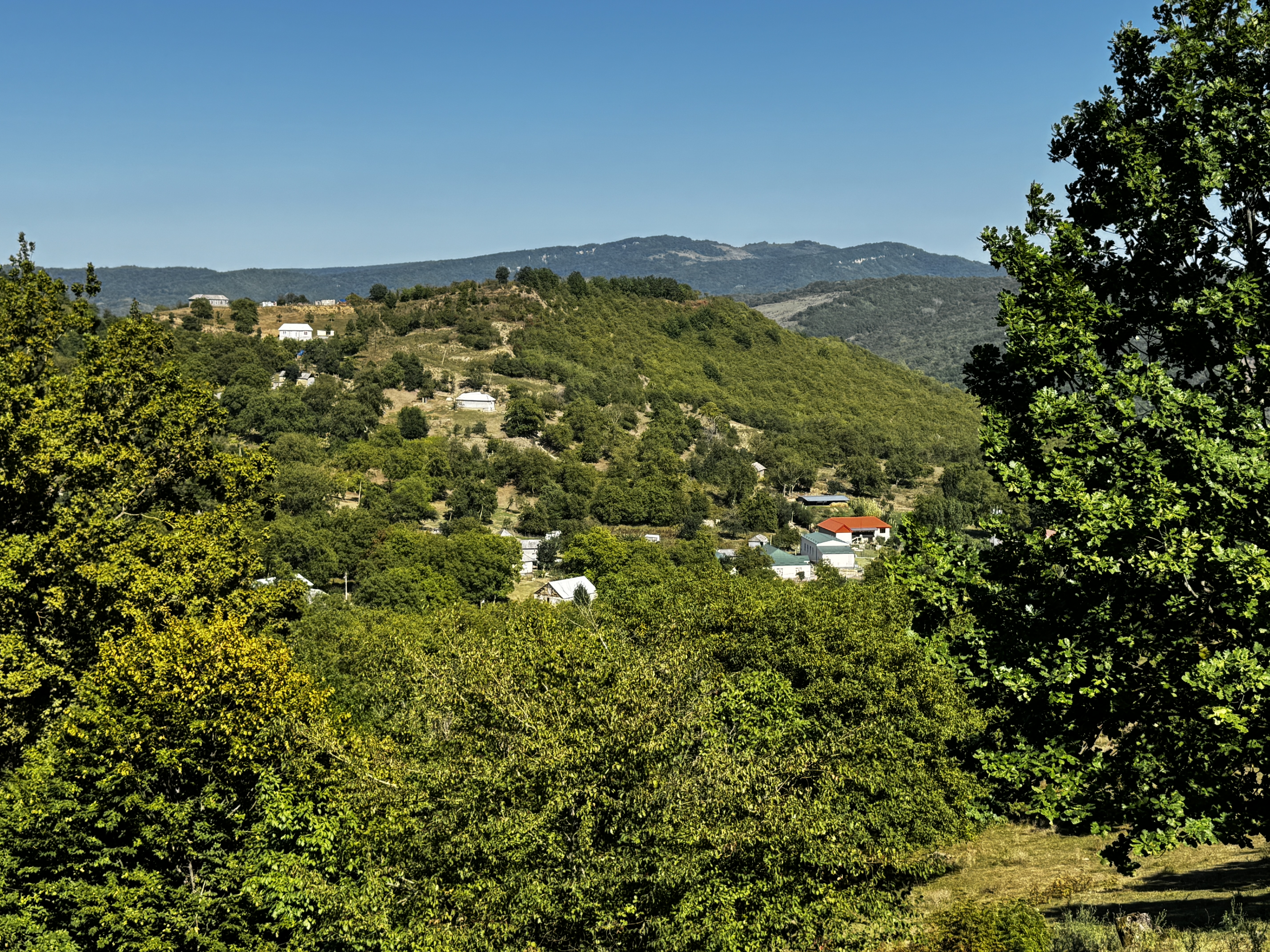
Koren-Benoy

Koren-Benoy (Russian: Корен-Беной, Chechen: Коьран-Бена, Köran-Bena) is a village (selo) in Kurchaloyevsky District, Chechnya.

== Administrative and municipal status ==
Municipally, Koren-Benoy is incorporated into Khidi-Khutorskoye rural settlement. It is one of two settlements included in it.

== Geography ==
Map of Kurchaloyevsky District. Koren-Benoy is in the Khidi-Khutor ("Хиди-Хутор") rural settlement

Koren-Benoy is located on the left bank of the Gums River. It is 13 kilometres (8.1 mi) south-east of the town of Kurchaloy and is 45 kilometres (28 mi) south-east of the city of Grozny.

The nearest settlements to Koren-Benoy are Khidi-Khutor in the north, Belty and Yalkhoy-Mokhk in the north-east, Malye Shuani in the east, Achereshki in the south-east, Enikali in the south, and Regita in the west.

== History ==
In 1944, after the genocide and deportation of the Chechen and Ingush people and the Chechen-Ingush ASSR was abolished, the village of Koren-Benoy was renamed, and settled by people from the neighbouring republic of Dagestan. From 1944 until 1957, the village was a part of the Shuragatsky District of the Dagestan ASSR.

In 1958, after the Vaynakh people returned and the Chechen-Ingush ASSR was restored, the village regained its old Chechen name, Kuran-Bena.

== Population ==
- 1990 Census: 279
- 2002 Census: 149
- 2010 Census: 413
- 2019 estimate: ?

According to the results of the 2010 Census, the majority of residents of Koren-Benoy were ethnic Chechens.
