= Bachi-Yurt =

Rural locality in Kurchaloyevsky District, Chechnya, Russia

Coordinates: 43°12′59″N 46°11′38″E

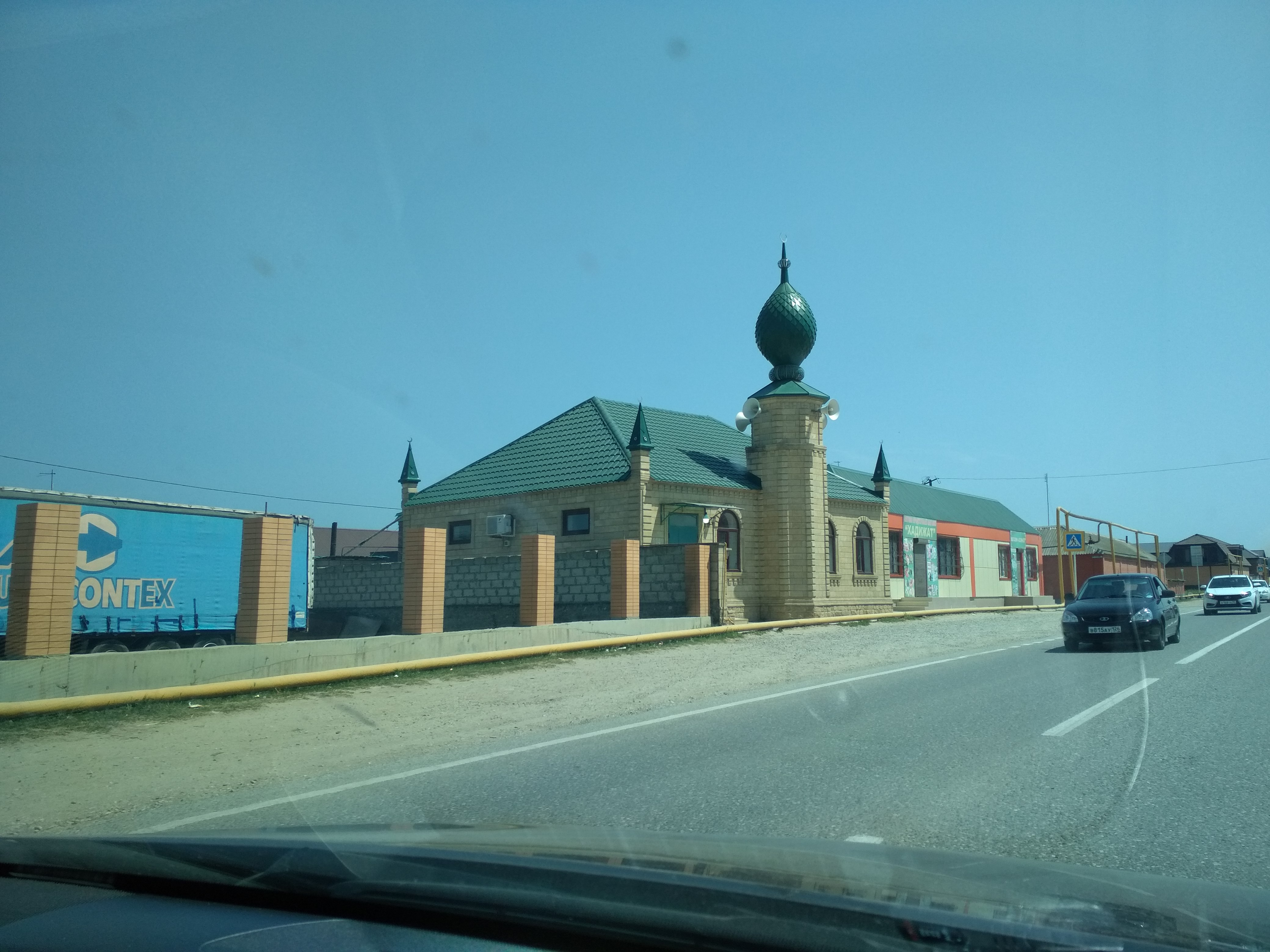
Street of Bachi-Yurt

Bachi-Yurt (Russian: Бачи-Юрт, Chechen: БӀачи-Йурт, Bjaçi-Yurt) is a rural locality (a selo) in Kurchaloyevsky District, Chechnya.

== Administrative and municipal status ==
Municipally, Bachi-Yurt is incorporated as Bachi-Yurtovskoye rural settlement. It is the administrative center of the municipality and the only settlement included in it.

== Geography ==
Map of Kurchaloyevsky District. Bachi-Yurt ("Бачи-Юрт") is in the center

Bachi-Yurt is located on both banks of the Gansol River. It is 7 kilometres (4.3 mi) north-east of Kurchaloy and 48 kilometres (30 mi) south-east of the city of Grozny.

The nearest settlements to Bachi-Yurt are Melchki in the north, Oyskhara and Verkhny Noyber in the north-east, Akhmat-Yurt in the east, Dzhigurty in the south, Mayrtup in the south-west, and Ilaskhan-Yurt in the north-west.

== History ==
In 1944, after the genocide and deportation of the Chechen and Ingush people and the Chechen-Ingush ASSR was abolished, the village of Bachi-Yurt was renamed to Pervomayskoye, and settled by people from the neighbouring republic of Dagestan.

In 1957, when the Vaynakh people returned and the Chechen-Ingush ASSR was restored, the village regained its old Chechen name, Bachi-Yurt.

== Population ==
- 1979 Census: 6,296
- 1990 Census: 7,342
- 2002 Census: 14,756
- 2010 Census: 16,485
- 2019 estimate: 19,350

According to the results of the 2010 Census, the majority of residents of Bachi-Yurt (16,431) were ethnic Chechens, with 54 people from other ethnic backgrounds.

== Infrastructure ==
Bachi-Yurt hosts a sports center, named after Akhmad Kadyrov, and a local mosque.
