= Achereshki =

Village in Kurchaloyevsky District, Russia

Coordinates: 43°04′50″N 46°08′11″E

Achereshki (Russian: Ачерешки, Chechen: Ачаршка, Açarşka), also spelled as Achireshki, is a rural locality (a selo) in Kurchaloyevsky District, Chechnya.

== Administrative and municipal status ==
Municipally, Achereshki is incorporated into Regitinskoye rural settlement. It is one of four settlements included in it.

== Geography ==
Map of Kurchaloyevsky District. Achereshki (not shown) is near to Regita ("Регита")

Achereshki is located on the left bank of the Gums River. It is 17 kilometres (11 mi) south-east of the town of Kurchaloy and is 57 kilometres (35 mi) south-east of the city of Grozny.

The nearest settlements to Achireshki are Khidi-Khutor in the north, Koren-Benoy in the north-east, Enikali in the south-east, Guni in the south-west, Marzoy-Mokhk in the west, and Regita in the north-west.

== History ==
The exact date of Achereshki being founded is unknown, but it is presumed that it was approximately in 1810.

In 1944, after the genocide and deportation of the Chechen and Ingush people and the Chechen-Ingush ASSR was abolished, the village of Regita was renamed to Antsukh, and settled by Avars from the Georgian SSR.

In 1958, after the Vaynakh people returned and the Chechen-Ingush ASSR was restored, the village regained its old Chechen name, Achereshki. The Avar people were resettled back to the Georgian SSR, in the village of Tivi (Gurgin-Rosu).

== Population ==
- 1990 Census: 242
- 2002 Census: 482
- 2010 Census: 252
- 2019 estimate: ?

According to the results of the 2010 Census, the majority of residents of Achereshki were ethnic Chechens.
