= Akhmat-Yurt =

Akhmat-Yurt Ахмат-Юрт
- Selo

Other transcription(s)
  - Chechen: Ахьмад-Йурт
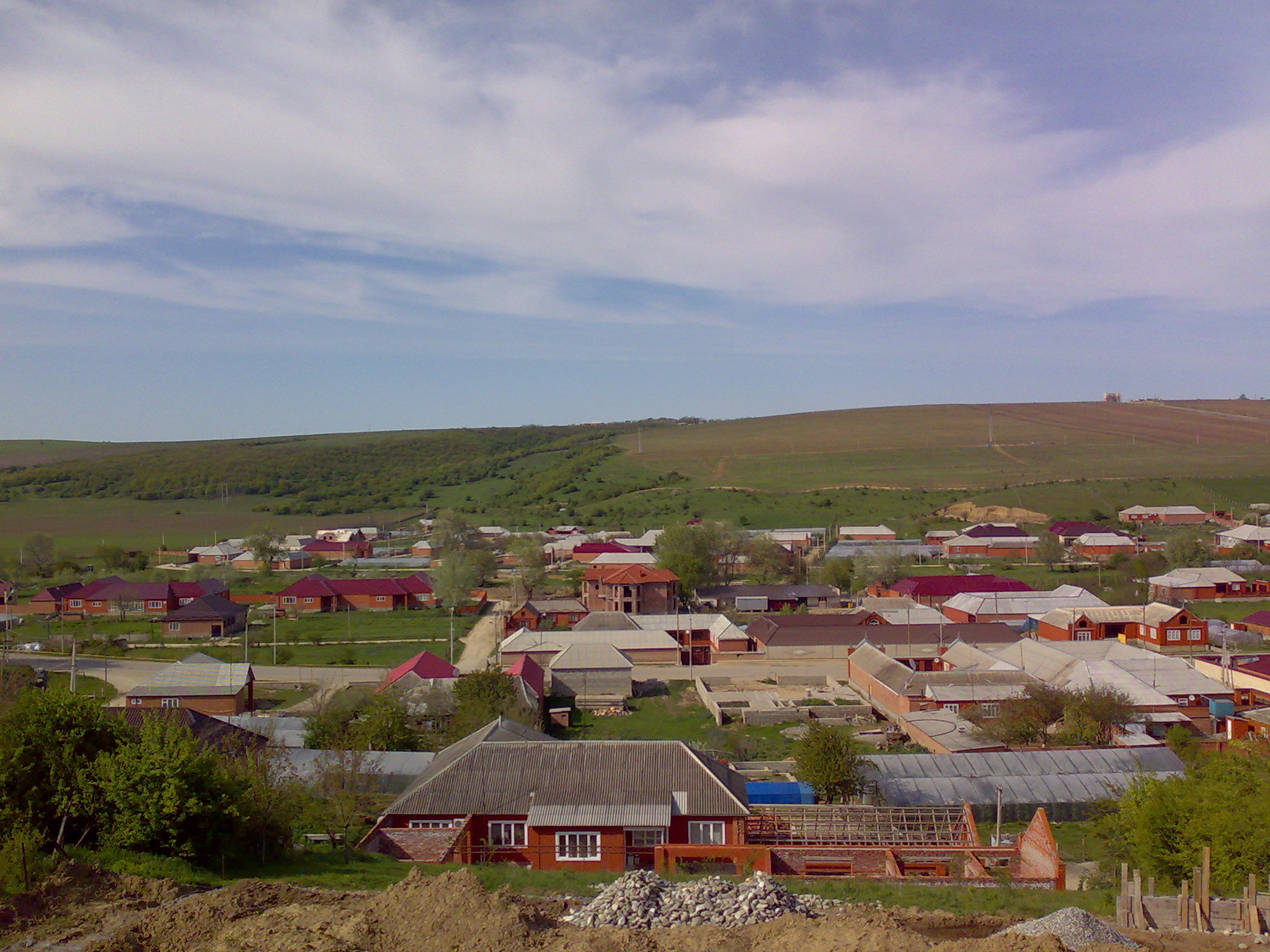
- View of Akhmat-Yurt
- Interactive map of Akhmat-Yurt
- Location of Akhmat-Yurt Akhmat-Yurt (Chechnya)
- Coordinates: 43°13′24″N 46°15′02″E
- Country: Russia
- Federal subject: Chechnya
- Administrative district: Kurchaloyevsky District
- Founded: 1850
- Elevation: 862 m (2,828 ft)

Population (2010 Census)
  - Total: 7,115
  - Estimate (2024): 9,206 (+29.4%)
- Time zone: UTC+3 (MSK)
- Postal code: 366318
- OKTMO ID: 96612440101

Akhmat-Yurt (Russian: Ахмат-Юрт; Chechen: Ахьмад-Йурт, romanized: Aẋmad-Yurt), formerly known as Tsentaroy or Tsentoroy in Russian (Центарой or Центорой) and Khosi-Yurt in Chechen (Хоси-Юрт), is a rural locality (a selo) in Kurchaloyevsky District of the Chechen Republic, Russia.

== Administrative and municipal status ==
Municipally, Akhmat-Yurt is incorporated as Akhmat-Yurtovskoye rural settlement. It is the administrative center of the municipality and the only settlement included in it.

== Geography ==
Map of Kurchaloyevsky District. Akhmat-Yurt (shown by its old name Tsentaroy, "Центарой") is in the east

Akhmat-Yurt is located on both banks of the Michik River. It is 12 kilometres (7.5 mi) north-east of Kurchaloy and 52 kilometres (32 mi) south-east of the city of Grozny.

The nearest settlements to Akhmat-Yurt are Oyskhara and Verkhny Noyber in the north, Alleroy in the east, Gansolchu in the south, Dzhigurty in the south-west, Bachi-Yurt in the west, and Ilaskhan-Yurt in the north-west.

== History ==
=== Foundation ===
The founder of the settlement was Khosa Umakhanov, a member of the teip "Tontaroy", the same teip who founded the village of Oyskhara in the 18th century, according to writer A. P. Berzhye.

=== Caucasian War ===
In 1840, during an uprising by the Chechens, under the leadership of Imam Shamil, displaced Chechens settled in villages located along the left bank of the Michik River. As a result, Akhmat-Yurt was founded, then called Khosi-Yurt.

In 1842, Khosa Umakhanov, the founder of the village, moved to Oki-Yurt (now a part of the village of Bachi-Yurt). He later moved to a gorge just south of Khosi-Yurt. He, with close friend Shuaib Mullah, took part in a famous campaign on Kizlyar, according to writer A. P. Berzhye.

After the occupation of Chechnya by the tsarist troops, Russian authorities began the process of enlarging settlements. This involved uniting small auls, as well as resettling the inhabitants of small farms to larger villages and then liquidating the farms. This was done to ease management, as it was almost impossible to manage all of the farms, which had become scattered throughout Chechnya due to the wars. To prevent a farm from being liquidated, at least 60 families needed to live on it. As a result, Khosa invited many of his family and friends to Khosi-Yurt, therefore, the settlement remained. Sheikh Kunta-Haji visited Khosa during a visit to Khosi-Yurt.

=== 1944–1958 ===
In 1944, after the genocide and deportation of the Chechen and Ingush people and the Chechen-Ingush ASSR was abolished, the village of Tsentaroy (Khosi-Yurt) was renamed to Krasnoarmeiskoye, and settled by people from the Levashinsky District of Dagestan.

In 1958, after the Vaynakh people returned and the Chechen-Ingush ASSR was restored, the village regained its old names, Tsentaroy in Russian, and Khosi-Yurt in Chechen.

=== Militant attacks on Tsentaroy ===
In May 2005, a group of militants attacked Tsentaroy. The village was attacked a second time on August 29, 2010.

=== Renaming ===
On May 21, 2019, the local residents in the village made a decision to rename the village to Akhmat-Yurt, in honour of the first President of the Chechen Republic, Akhmad Kadyrov. However, for the name change to become official, the Chechen authorities had to decide to approve it. The decision was made to approve the change on July 12, 2019. The name change of this settlement from Tsentaroy to Akhmat-Yurt became official on August 26, 2019.

== Population ==
Population: 8,549 (2018 Census); 7,115 (2010 census); 5,658 (2002 census).
