= Akhkinchu-Borzoy =

Rural locality in Chechnya

Coordinates: 43°08′02″N 46°11′46″E

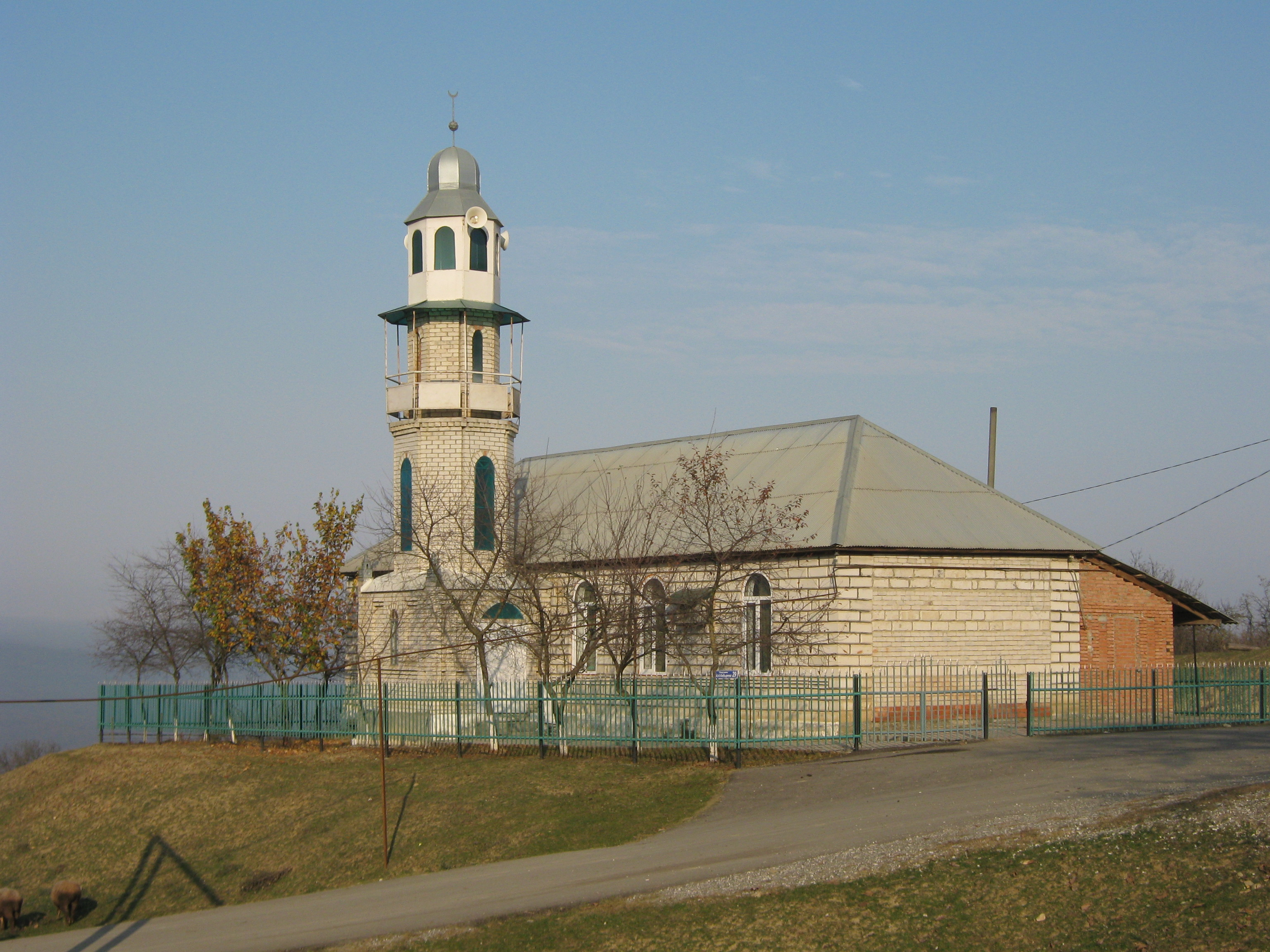
Mosque in the village of Akhkinchu-Borzoi

Akhkinchu-Borzoy (Russian: Ахкинчу-Борзой, Chechen: Аьхкинчу-Борзе, Äxkinçu-Borze), also spelled as Akhkinchu-Borzoi, is a rural locality (a selo) in Kurchaloyevsky District, Chechnya.

== Administrative and municipal status ==
Municipally, Akhkinchu-Borzoy is incorporated as Akhkinchu-Borzoyskoye rural settlement. It is the administrative center of the municipality and the only settlement included in it.

== Geography ==
Map of Kurchaloyevsky District. Akhkinchu-Borzoy ("Ахкинчу-Борзой") is in the center

Akhkinchu-Borzoy is located on the left bank of the Gums River in a mountainous area. It is located 15 kilometres (9.3 mi) south-east of the city of Kurchaloy and 57 kilometres (35 mi) south-east of the city of Grozny.

The nearest settlements to Akhkinchu-Borzoy are Dzhigurty in the north, Gansolchu in the east, Yalkhoy-Mokhk in the south, and Khidi-Khutor in the south-west.

== History ==
In 1944, after the genocide and deportation of the Chechen and Ingush people and the Chechen-Ingush ASSR was abolished, the village of Akhkinchu-Borzoy was renamed to Novo-Ritlyab, and was settled by Avar people from the village of Ritlyab in the neighboring republic of Dagestan.

In 1957, when the Vaynakh people returned and the Chechen-Ingush ASSR was restored, the village regained its old Chechen name, Akhkinchu-Borze.

On 12 January 2002, during a special operation, Salman Basayev, the father of Shamil Basayev, was apparently killed in the village.

== Population ==
- 1990 Census: 858
- 2002 Census: 1,282
- 2010 Census: 1,889
- 2019 estimate: 2,046

According to the results of the 2010 Census, the majority of residents of Akhkinchu-Borzoy (1,887) were ethnic Chechens, with 2 people from other ethnic backgrounds.

== Infrastructure ==
Akhkinchu-Borzoy hosts a mosque and one secondary school.
