= Khidi-Khutor =

Village in Kurchaloyevsky District, Russia

Coordinates: 43°06′54″N 46°08′49″E

Khidi-Khutor (Russian: Хиди-Хутор, Chechen: Хьиди-КӀотар, Ẋidi-Khotar) is a rural locality (a selo) in Kurchaloyevsky District, Chechnya.

== Administrative and municipal status ==
Municipally, Khidi-Khutor is incorporated as Khidi-Khutorskoye rural settlement. It is the administrative center of the municipality and one of two settlements included in it.

== Geography ==
Map of Kurchaloyevsky District. Khidi-Khutor ("Хиди-Хутор") is in the south

Khidi-Khutor is located on the right bank of the Gums River. It is 14 kilometres (8.7 mi) south-east of Kurchaloy and 43 kilometres (27 mi) south-east of the city of Grozny.

The nearest settlements to Khidi-Khutor are Mayrtup in the north, Dzhigurty and Akhkinchu-Borzoy in the north-east, Belty and Yalkhoy-Mokhk in the east, Koren-Benoy and Achereshki in the south, Regita in the south-west, Dzhaglargi in the west, and Avtury in the north-west.

== Name ==
The name of the village translates roughly as "Hidi's farm" - with "Hidi" being the name of the founder.

== History ==
In 1944, after the genocide and deportation of the Chechen and Ingush people and the Chechen-Ingush ASSR was abolished, the village of Khidi-Khutor was renamed to Gunzi, and settled by people from the neighbouring republic of Dagestan.

In 1957, when the Vaynakh people returned and the Chechen-Ingush ASSR was restored, the village regained its old Chechen name, Khidi-Khutor.

== Population ==
- 1990 Census: 819
- 2002 Census: 600
- 2010 Census: 1,093
- 2019 estimate: ?

According to the results of the 2010 Census, the majority of residents of Khidi-Khutor were ethnic Chechens.

== Famous Natives ==
Said Shaipov, a Chechen artist, was born in Khidi-Khutor.
