= Mayrtup =

Rural locality in Chechnya, Russia

Coordinates: 43°12′N 46°08′E

Mayrtup (Russian: Майртуп, Chechen: Майртуп) is a village (selo) in Kurchaloyevsky District, Chechnya.

== Administrative and municipal status ==
Municipally, Mayrtup is incorporated as Mayrtupskoye rural settlement. It is the administrative center of the municipality and the only settlement included in it.

== Geography ==
Map of Kurchaloyevsky District. Mayrtup ("Майртуп") is in the center

Mayrtup is located on the left bank of the Gums River, at the confluence of the Isnerk River. It is on the outskirts of the town of Kurchaloy and is 42 kilometres (26 mi) south-east of the city of Grozny.

The nearest settlements to Mayrtup are Ilaskhan-Yurt in the north-west, Bachi-Yurt in the north-east, Dzhigurty in the south-east, Khidi-Khutor in the south, and the town of Kurchaloy in the west.

== History ==
Between 1818 and 1826, Mayrtup was the center of an uprising led by a resident of the village, named Beybulat Taimiev. The village also became a social and political center where the national council, "Mekhk-Khel" occurred.

On May 24, 1821, an announcement took place at the national convention in the mosque of Mayrtup. At that time, the mosque was a spiritual center of Chechnya.

On May 25, 1825, the All-Chechen congress gathered in the village. An election was made at the congress by the Imam of Chechnya of Magoma Kuduklinsky.

In 1834, at the next All-Chechen congress in the village of Mayrtup, Tashav-Khadzhi was elected as the leader of Chechnya, as an imam.

The village suffered greatly in the Caucasian War and was often ravaged by Russian invaders. One notable incident occurred in November of 1840, when the villages of Mayrtup and Aki-Yurt were heavily raided. After the war ended, the farms around Mayrtup were liquidated and their populations were resettled to Mayrtup, under Tsarist policies.

In 1877, during the "Alibek-Haji Uprising", the first major battle of the uprising occurred near the northern outskirts of Mayrtup. As a result, the village was partially destroyed.

In 1944, after the genocide and deportation of the Chechen and Ingush people and the Chechen-Ingush ASSR was abolished, the village of Mayrtup was renamed to Sulebkent, and settled by people from the neighbouring republic of Dagestan, particularly, by ethnic Dargins.

In 1957, when the Vaynakh people returned and the Chechen-Ingush ASSR was restored, the village regained its old Chechen name, Mayrtup.

== Population ==
- 2002 Census: 10,754
- 2010 Census: 11,838
- 2018 estimate: 13,391

According to the 2010 Census, the majority of residents of Mayrtup (11,777) were ethnic Chechens, with 61 people from other ethnic backgrounds.
