= Dzhigurty =

Village in Chechnya, Russia

Coordinates: 43°09′50″N 46°10′45″E

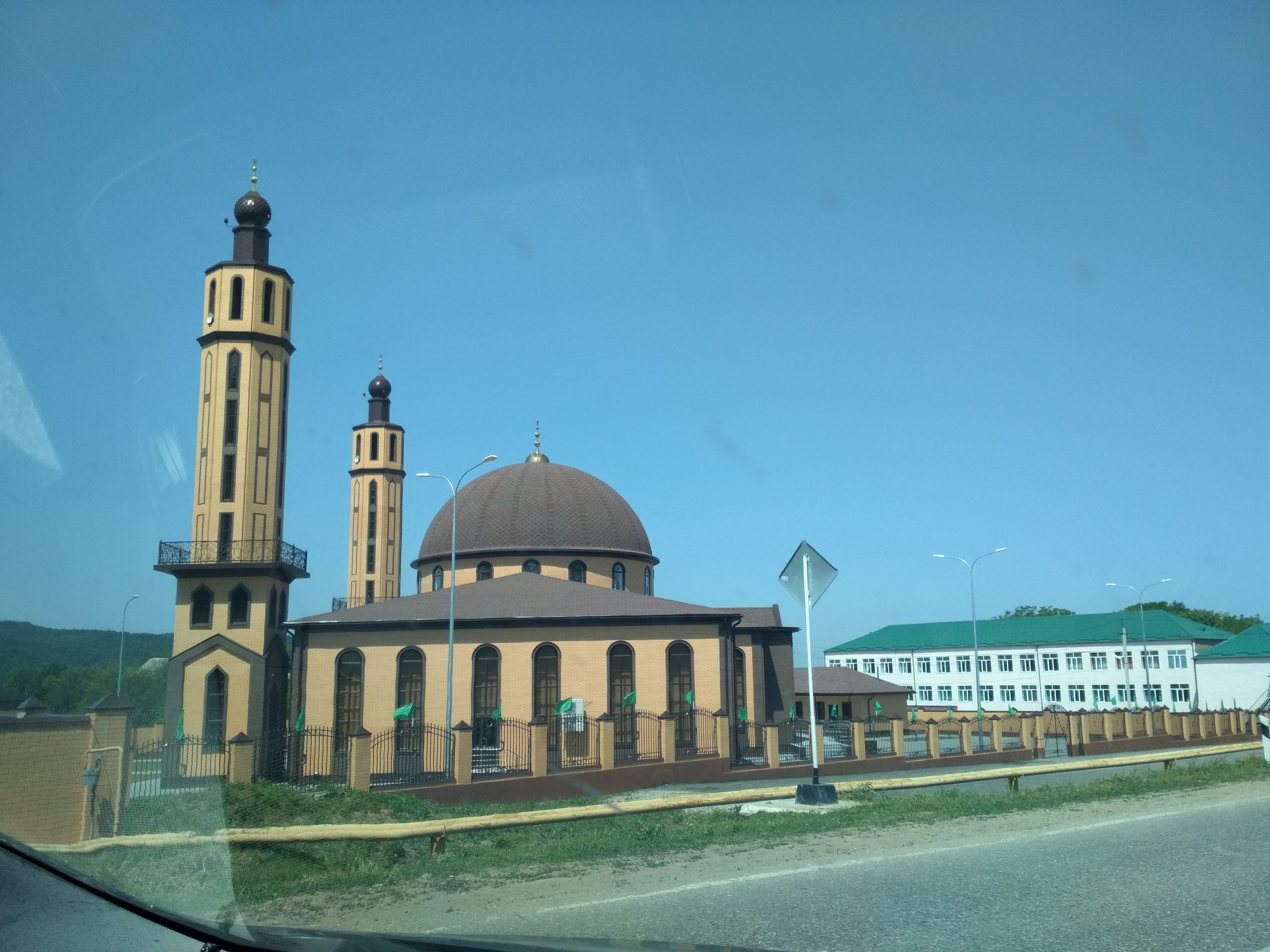
Dzhigurty

Dzhigurty (Russian: Джигурты, Chechen: ЖугӀурта, Ƶuġurta) is a village (selo) in Kurchaloyevsky District, Chechnya.

== Administrative and municipal status ==
Municipally, Dzhigurty is incorporated as Dzhigurtinskoye rural settlement. It is the administrative center of the municipality and the only settlement included in it.

== Geography ==
Map of Kurchaloyevsky District. Dzhigurty ("Джигурты") is in the center

Dzhigurty is located on the right bank of the Gums River. It is 12 kilometres (7.5 mi) south-east of the town of Kurchaloy and is 53 kilometres (33 mi) south-east of the city of Grozny.

The nearest settlements to Dzhigurty are Bachi-Yurt and Akhmat-Yurt in the north-east, Gansolchu in the south-east, Akhkinchu-Borzoy and Yalkhoy-Mokhk in the south, Khidi-Khutor in the south-west, and Mayrtup in the north-west.

== History ==
The name Dzhigurty originates from the Chechen: жагӏа ара тӏе, translating roughly as "gravel meadow". Weapons such as daggers and blades were made in the village. Due to this, during the 18th and 19th centuries, Dzhigurty became a center for the production of such weapons in the north-eastern Caucasus.

In 1944, after the genocide and deportation of the Chechen and Ingush people and the Chechen-Ingush ASSR was abolished, the village of Dzhigurty was renamed to Mulebki, and settled by people from the neighbouring republic of Dagestan.

In 1958, after the Vaynakh people returned and the Chechen-Ingush ASSR was restored, the village regained its old Chechen name, Dzhigurty.

== Population ==
- 2002 Census: 1,752
- 2010 Census: 1,967
- 2018 estimate: 2,178

According to the 2010 Census, the majority of residents of Dzhigurty were ethnic Chechens.

== Education ==
The village hosts the Dzhigurty Municipal Secondary School.
