= Alleroy, Kurchaloyevsky District, Chechen Republic =

Rural locality of the Chechen Republic, Russia

Coordinates: 43.087°N 46.302°E

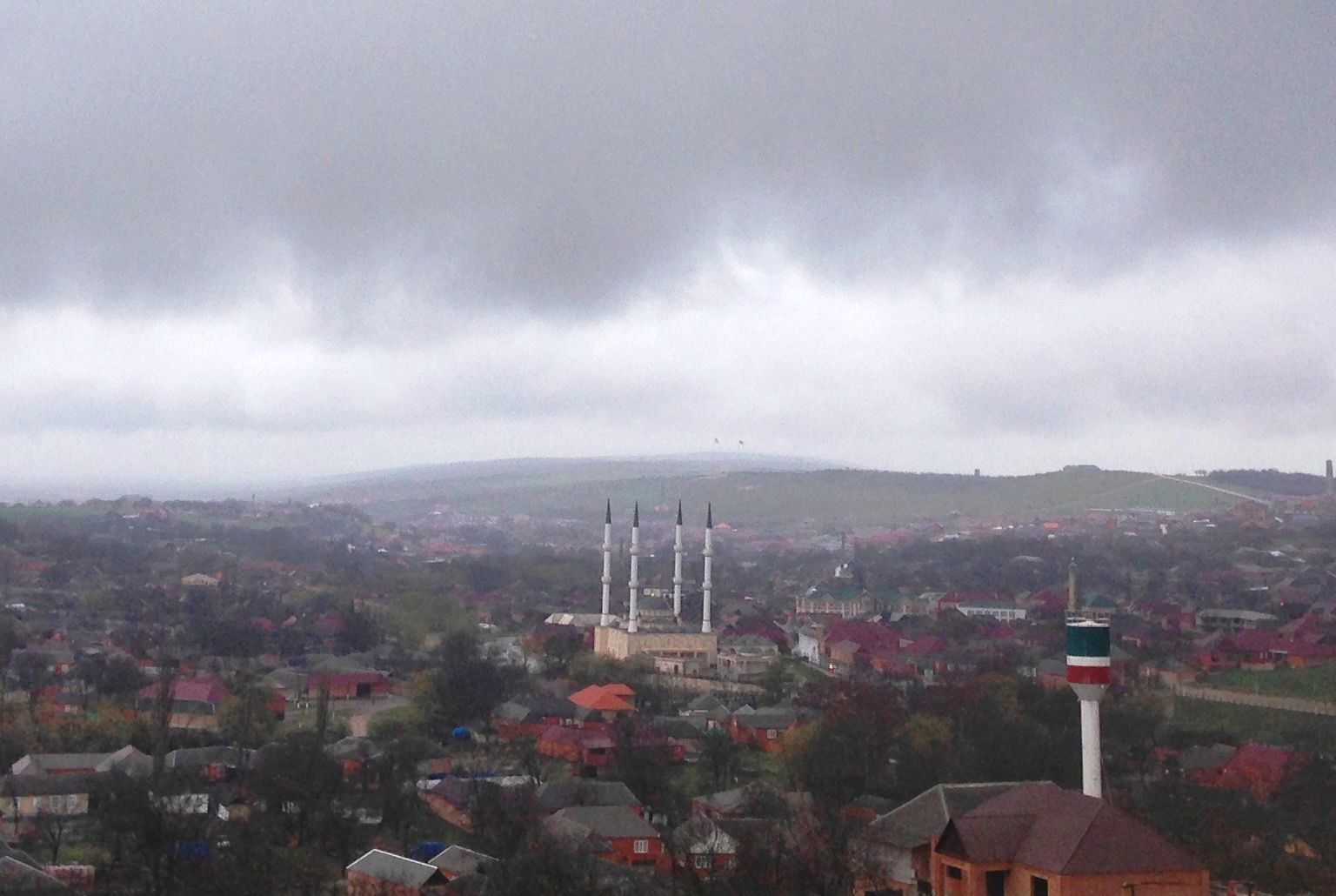
Alleroy

Alleroy (Russian: Аллерой; Chechen: Ӏаларой-Эвла, Jalaroy-Evla) is a rural locality (a selo) in Kurchaloyevsky District of the Chechen Republic, Russia.

== Administrative and municipal status ==
Municipally, Alleroy is incorporated into Alleroyskoye rural settlement. It is the administrative center of the municipality and is the only settlement included in it.

== Geography ==
Map of Kurchaloyevsky District. Alleroy ("Аллерой") is in the east

Alleroy is located on both banks of the Michik River at the confluence of the Maly Michik tributary. It is located 17 kilometres (11 mi) north-east of the town of Kurchaloy and 60 kilometres (37 mi) south-east of the city of Grozny.

The nearest settlements to Alleroy are Verkhny Noyber in the north, Koshkeldy in the north-east, Ishkhoy-Yurt in the east, Galayty and Meskety in the south-east, and Akhmat-Yurt in the west.

== History ==
In 1944, after the genocide and deportation of the Chechen and Ingush people and the Chechen-Ingush ASSR was abolished, the village of Alleroy was renamed to Shuragat, and settled by people from the neighboring republic of Dagestan. From 1944 to 1957, it was the administrative center of the Shuragatsky District of the Dagestan ASSR.

In 1958, after the Vaynakh people returned and the Chechen-Ingush ASSR was restored, the village regained its old Chechen name, Alleroy.

== Post-war insurgency in Chechnya ==
On January 28–29, 2004, a force of Akhmad Kadyrov's Security Service and police carried out a mass cleansing operation in Alleroy. Two days later Sultan Dadayev, who led the operation, and four of his men were shot dead in Aleroy by pro-Maskhadov fighters.

On May 1, 2004, Alleroy was invaded by fighters from the Akhmed Avdarkhanov group. The combatants went to the home of the Abuyev family, whose son Suleiman worked for Kadyrov Security Service. Suleiman was not at home and the fighters kidnapped Yusup Abuyev, Abukar Abuyev, and Isa Ousmayev. The hostages' relatives were told the men were kidnapped in retaliation for the murder of Ruslan Dalkhanov, who had been kidnapped from his house by Kadyrov's Security Service under command of Suleiman Abuyev and tortured to death. On November 9, 2004, a grave was discovered in the proximity of Aleroy, which contained the bodies of the three men, kidnapped by the Chechen fighters on May 1.

On July 12, 2004, guerrillas entered Alleroy. The fighters first blocked all entrances to the village and then in the videotaped attack seized the buildings of the security forces, inflicting heavy casualties and capturing twelve members of pro-Moscow Chechen militia. A small relief force composed of a carload of paramilitaries was ambushed and destroyed, according to villagers.

== Population ==
- 1874 Census: 998
- 2002 Census: 10,225
- 2010 Census: 11,132
- 2018 Census: 13,151

According to the 2010 Census, the majority of residents of Alleroy (11,099) were ethnic Chechens, with 33 people from other ethnic backgrounds.

The absolute majority of the village's population are from the Alleroy teip (clan). To the south of this village lies the clan's ancestral village of the same name, Alleroy.

== Infrastructure ==
Alleroy hosts three secondary schools, a mosque, and a kindergarten.

== Famous natives ==
- Akhmed Avdorkhanov - Commander of the Presidential Guard of the Chechen Republic of Ichkeria, head of security for Aslan Maskhadov.
- Zaurbek Avdorkhanov - Field commander of armed units of the Caucasus Emirate. Brother of Akhmed Avdorkhanov.
- Khunkar-Pasha Israpilov - Active participant in the Chechen conflict in the 1990s to 2000s as a field commander.

== Sources ==
- Institute for War & Peace Reporting, 2004
