= Akhmed Avdorkhanov =

Chechen warlord (1971–2005)

Akhmad Avdorkhanov
- Avdorkhanov in Washington

Head of security for President Aslan Maskhadov
- In office 1996–2000

Personal details
- Born: 1971 Alleroy, Checheno-Ingush ASSR, Soviet Union
- Died: 12 September 2005 (aged 33–34) Chechen Republic of Ichkeria
- Awards: Qoman siy

Military service
- Allegiance: Chechen Republic of Ichkeria
- Years of service: 1994–2005
- Rank: Brigadier general
- Commands: Eastern front (2005)
- Battles/wars: First Chechen War; Second Chechen War

Akhmad Avdorkhanov (Russian: Ахмад Зелимханович Авдорханов; 1971 — 12 September 2005) was a former head of security for Ichkerian President Aslan Maskhadov.

== Biography ==
Officially the Russian state suggested he was killed by Shamil Basayev in a dispute over money or due to ideology, as he opposed the militant Islam of Basayev and his followers, while the Chechen insurgents claim he was killed by Russian forces.

President Vladimir Putin called Avdorkhanov's death "a turning point", since according to him Avdorkhanov was the last nationalist leader, and the remaining leaders of the Chechen resistance are radical Islamists who will not receive as much support among the local people.

His younger brother Zaurbek served as a field commander in the Caucasus Emirate, and most notably was one of the leaders of the August 2010 raid on Chechen President Ramzan Kadyrov's home village of Tsentoroy. Zaurbek was killed in what is believed to be an accidental explosion in Galashki, Ingushetia on 31 July 2012.
