= Dzhaglargi =

Village in Kurchaloyevsky District, Russia

Coordinates: 43°07′N 46°06′E

Dzhaglargi (Russian: Джагларги, Chechen: ЖагӀларги, Ƶaġlargi) is a village (selo) in Kurchaloyevsky District, Chechnya.

== Administrative and municipal status ==
Municipally, Dzhaglargi is incorporated into Regitinskoye rural settlement. It is one of four settlements included in it.

== Geography ==
Map of Kurchaloyevsky District. Dzhaglargi (not shown) is near to Regita ("Регита")

Dzhaglargi is located in the upper reaches of the Khumys and Morzhaterling rivers. It is located 9 kilometres (5.6 mi) south-east of the town of Kurchaloy and 57 kilometres (35 mi) south-east of the city of Grozny.

The nearest settlements to Dzhaglargi are the city of Kurchaloy in the north, Khidi-Khutor in the east, Regita in the south-east, Marzoy-Mokhk in the south, and Niki-Khita in the west.

== History ==
In 1944, after the genocide and deportation of the Chechen and Ingush people and the Chechen-Ingush ASSR was abolished, the village of Dzhaglargi was renamed and settled by people from the neighbouring republic of Dagestan.

In 1958, after the Vaynakh people returned and the Chechen-Ingush ASSR was restored, the village regained its old Chechen name, Dzhaglargi.

== Population ==
- 2002 Census: 280
- 2010 Census: 511

According to the 2010 Census, the majority of residents of Dzhaglargi were ethnic Chechens.
