= Belty, Kurchaloyevsky District =

Village in Kurchaloyevsky District, Russia

Coordinates: 43°06′15″N 46°10′08″E

Belty (Russian: Бельты, Chechen: Белта, Belta) is a rural locality (a selo) in Kurchaloyevsky District, Chechnya.

== Administrative and municipal status ==
Municipally, Belty is incorporated into Yalkhoy-Mokhkskoye rural settlement. It is one of three settlements included in it.

== Geography ==
Map of Kurchaloyevsky District. Belty (not shown) is in the Yalkhoy-Mokhk ("Ялхой-Мохк") rural settlement

Belty is located on the left bank of the Gums River. It is 14 kilometres (8.7 mi) south-east of Kurchaloy and 45 kilometres (28 mi) south-east of the city of Grozny.

The nearest settlements to Belty are Akhkinchu-Borzoy in the north-east, Yalkhoy-Mokhk in the east, Koren-Benoy in the south-west, and Khidi-Khutor in the west.

== History ==
In 1944, after the genocide and deportation of the Chechen and Ingush people and the Chechen-Ingush ASSR was abolished, the village of Belty was renamed to Sagada, and settled by people from the neighbouring republic of Dagestan.

In 1957, when the Vaynakh people returned and the Chechen-Ingush ASSR was restored, the village regained its old Chechen name, Belta.

== Population ==
- 2010 Census: 943
- 2019 estimate: ?

According to the results of the 2010 Census, the majority of residents of Belta were ethnic Chechens.

== Education ==
Belty hosts one secondary school.
