= Yalkhoy-Mokhk =

Village in Kurchaloyevsky District, Russia

Coordinates: 43°06′20″N 46°11′20″E

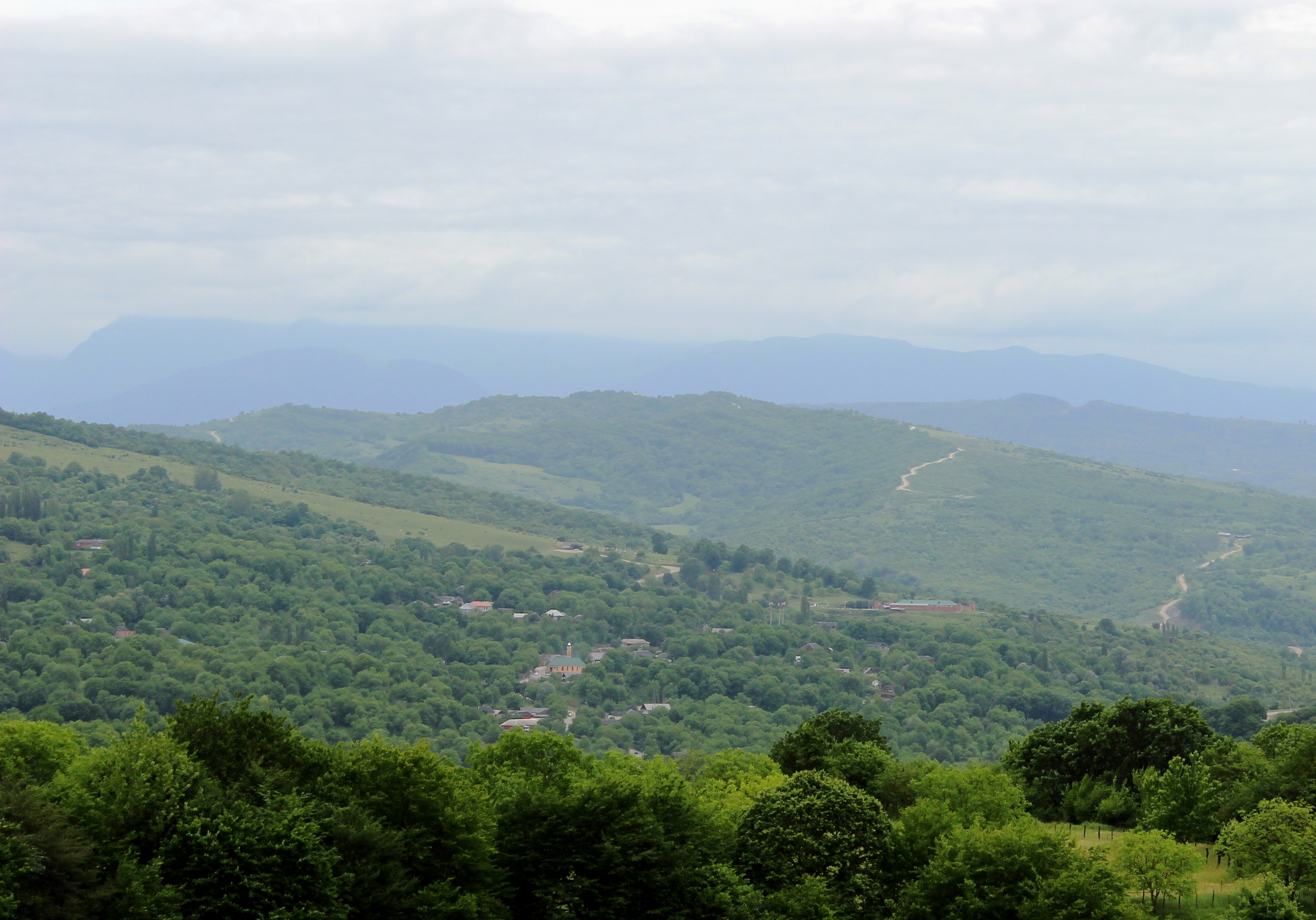
Yalkhoy-Mokhk

Yalkhoy-Mokhk (Russian: Ялхой-Мохк, Chechen: Ялхой-Мохк, Yalxoy-Moxk) is a village (selo) in Kurchaloyevsky District, Chechnya.

== Administrative and municipal status ==
Municipally, Yalkhoy-Mokhk is incorporated as Yalkhoy-Mokhkskoye rural settlement. It is the administrative center of the municipality and one of three settlements included in it.

== Geography ==
Map of Kurchaloyevsky District. Yalkhoy-Mokhk ("Ялхой-Мохк") is in the south

Yalkhoy-Mokhk is located on the right bank of the Gums River. It is 20 kilometres (12 mi) south-east of Kurchaloy and 60 kilometres (37 mi) south-east of the city of Grozny.

The nearest settlements to Yalkhoy-Mokhk are Akhkinchu-Borzoy in the north, Gansolchu in the north-east, Turty-Khutor in the east, Malye Shuani in the south-east, Khashki-Mokhk in the south, Enikali and Koren-Benoy in the south-west, Belty in the west, and Khidi-Khutor in the north-west.

== Name ==
There is a legend that Yalkhoy-Mokhk was founded by a group of six warriors. The name comes from Chechen "ялх" (six), "хой" (warrior), "мохк" (country).

== History ==
In 1944, after the genocide and deportation of the Chechen and Ingush people and the Chechen-Ingush ASSR was abolished, the village of Yalkhoy-Mokhk was renamed to Tlyadal, and settled by people from the neighbouring republic of Dagestan.

In 1957, when the Vaynakh people returned and the Chechen-Ingush ASSR was restored, the village regained its old Chechen name, Yalkhoy-Mokhk.

== Population ==
- 2002 Census: 4,049
- 2010 Census: 4,452
- 2018 estimate: unknown

According to the 2010 Census, the majority of residents of Yalkhoy-Mokhk were ethnic Chechens.
