= Tovbolat Kurchaloevsky =

Chechen military figure

Tovbolat Hajji
- Сулим кIант Товболт
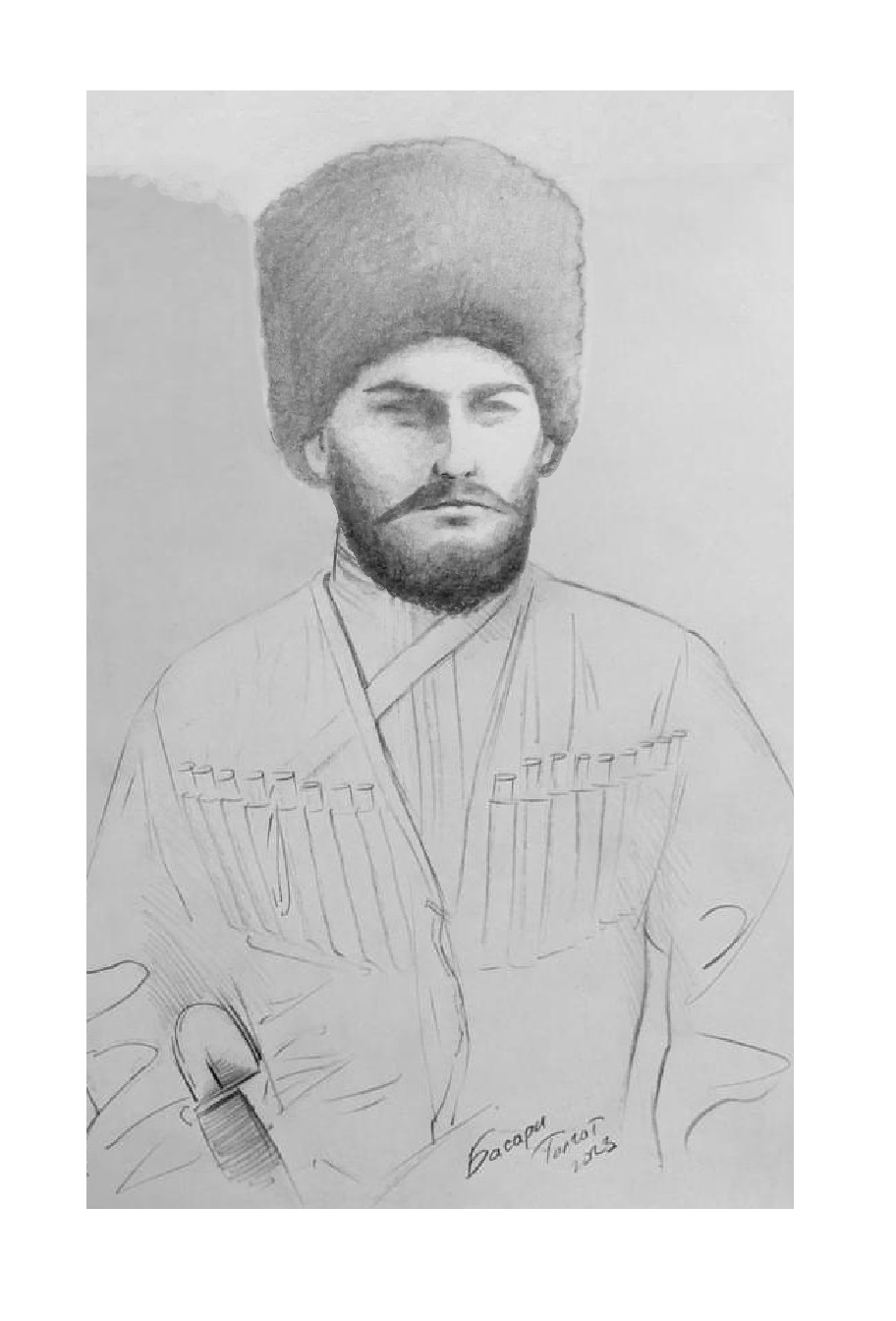
- Tovbolat Kurchaloevsky
- Born: Tovbolt; 1830; Kurchaloy, Caucasian Imamate
- Died: 1898 (aged 67–68); Kurchaloy, Terek Oblast, Russian Empire
- Other name: Tovbolat Kurchaloevsky
- Military career
- Branch: Partisan
- Service years: 1850–1861
- Conflicts: Caucasian War

Tovbolat Kurchaloevsky (Russian: Товболат Курчалоевский) also known as Tovbolat-Hajji (Chechen: Сулим кӀант Товболт-Хьаж, romanized: Sulim k'ant Tovbolt-H'äzh; c. 1830s – 1898) was a Chechen outlaw (abrek) and military figure who participated in the Caucasian War.

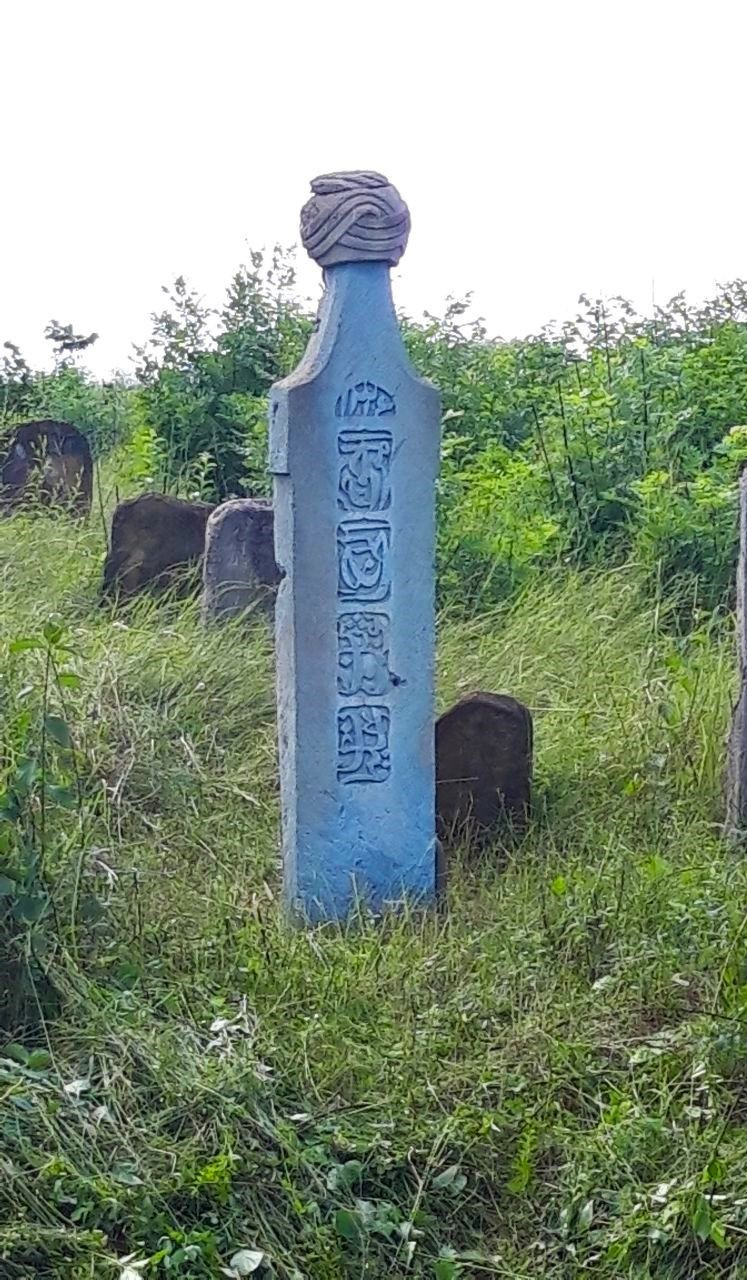
Tovbolat-Hajji's grave in Kurchaloy

== Biography ==
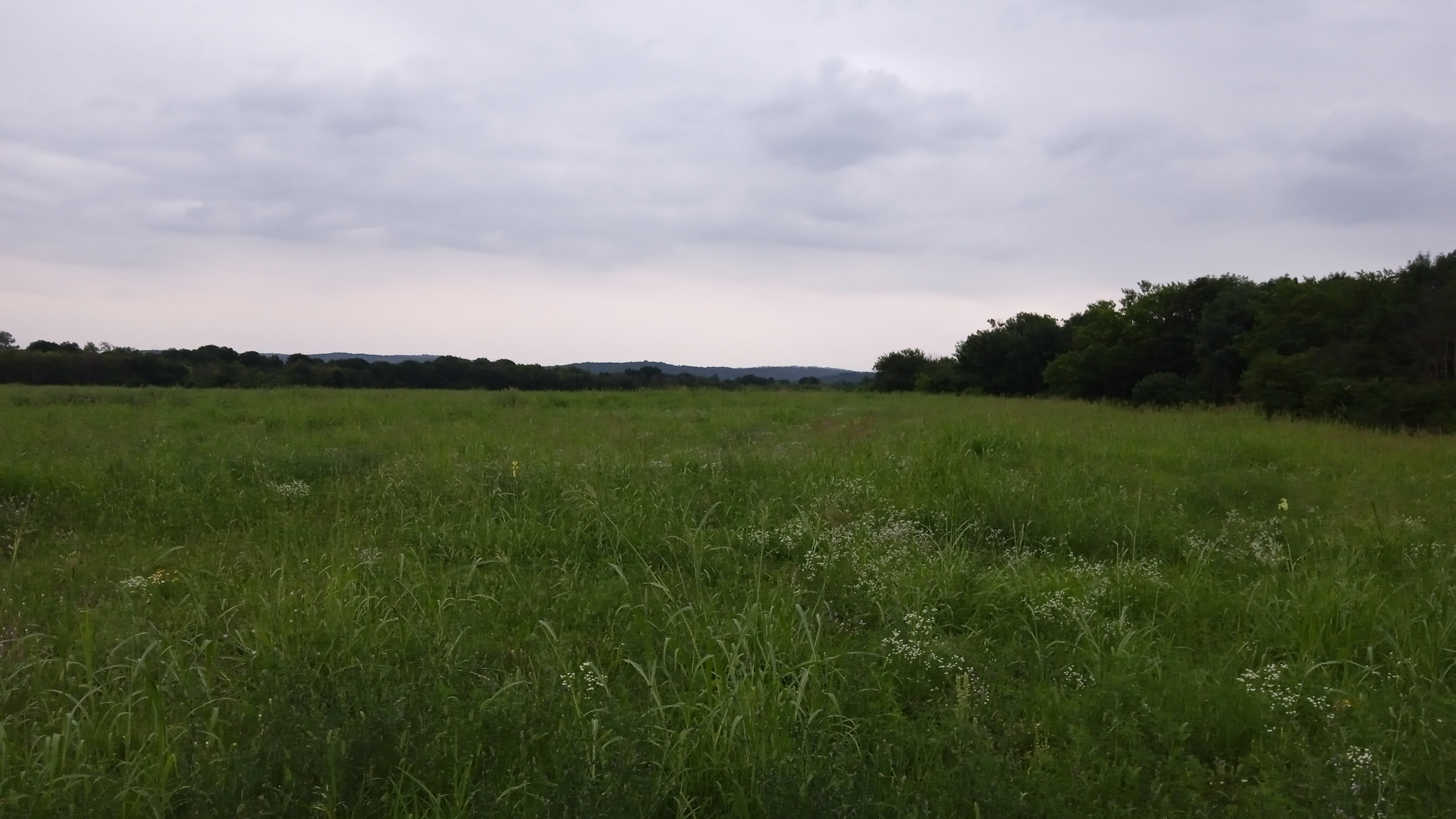
Tovbolata Ridge

Born into a Chechen family of the Kurchaloy clan (teip) in Kurchaloy around the 1830s, Tovbolat was a descendant of Bersa Sheikh. His father Sulim was a participant of the Caucasian War on the side of Imam Shamil and took an active part in the founding of Kurchaloy. He died in battle with the Russian forces. Tovbolat was engaged in farming at his farm before leaving for abrechestvo, at the same time he drove herds of horses to the high-mountain Georgian village Shatili, he was the first Kurchaloevtsy who used this route through the mountain passes, through which later there were regular trade campaigns. In Shatili he established friendly relations with the Khevsurs. Soon he himself began breeding thoroughbred horses for sale in Georgia. He became a murid of the Chechen Sufi Bamat-Girey-Hajji Mitaev of Avtura.

Because of the imperial policy of military and economic blockade, Chechens began to assemble mounted detachments to raid Cossack villages, one of which included Tovbolat. The raid was the main test of Tovbolat's personal merits. Successful raids over the Terek affected his popularity among the people. During the Conquest of the Caucasus by the Russian Empire, the Russians called abreks any unfriendly highlanders who, alone or in small groups, waged partisan warfare against the conquerors. Historian Sh. A. Gapurov notes:

Apart from raids for the sake of booty, there were also those in which the highlanders regarded any action on the Russian side either as revenge for their kin killed during punitive campaigns of Cossacks and tsarist troops on the highland lands, or as a struggle for freedom.

In one of the Zaterechny raids he was seriously wounded and lost an arm in a skirmish with the Cossacks. He managed to escape from pursuit with a severed hand, which he preserved in melted wax to be buried with him after his death.

In his old age he made Hajj to Mecca on horseback. He died in 1898 and was buried in the cemetery in Kurchaloy.

== Family ==
In Shatili he was friends with a Khevsur named Shota, after whom Tovbolat named his son. Son Shota married a avturinka, their descendants under the surname Shataevs live in the town of Kurchaloy. Grandson is a public figure Magomed Shataev.

== Memory ==
The Tovbolat Ridge (Chechen: ТӀоболт дукъ, romanized: T'obolt duqh) is located in the vicinity of the town of Kurchaloy. A place where horses were kept, a tract in the south. Its name is also attributed to Tovbolat.

== Bibliography ==
=== Russian sources ===
- Isaev (2023-05-19). "Абрек из Курчалоя: Товболат-хаджи" [Abrek from Kurchaloy: Tovbolat-Hadji]. Gums (in Russian). No. 21–22. Gudermes.
- Katsaev, S.-Kh. (2023-07-07). "Товболат-Хаджи Курчаловский" [Tovbolat-Hajji Kurchalovskiy]. Rodina Geroya (in Russian). No. 27–28. p. 5.
- Padarov, A. (2023-05-19). "Абрек Товболат" [Abrek Tovbolat]. Gums (in Russian). No. 21–22. p. 3.
