= Magomed Shataev =

Chechen politician

- ШотӀи-КӀант Мохьмад
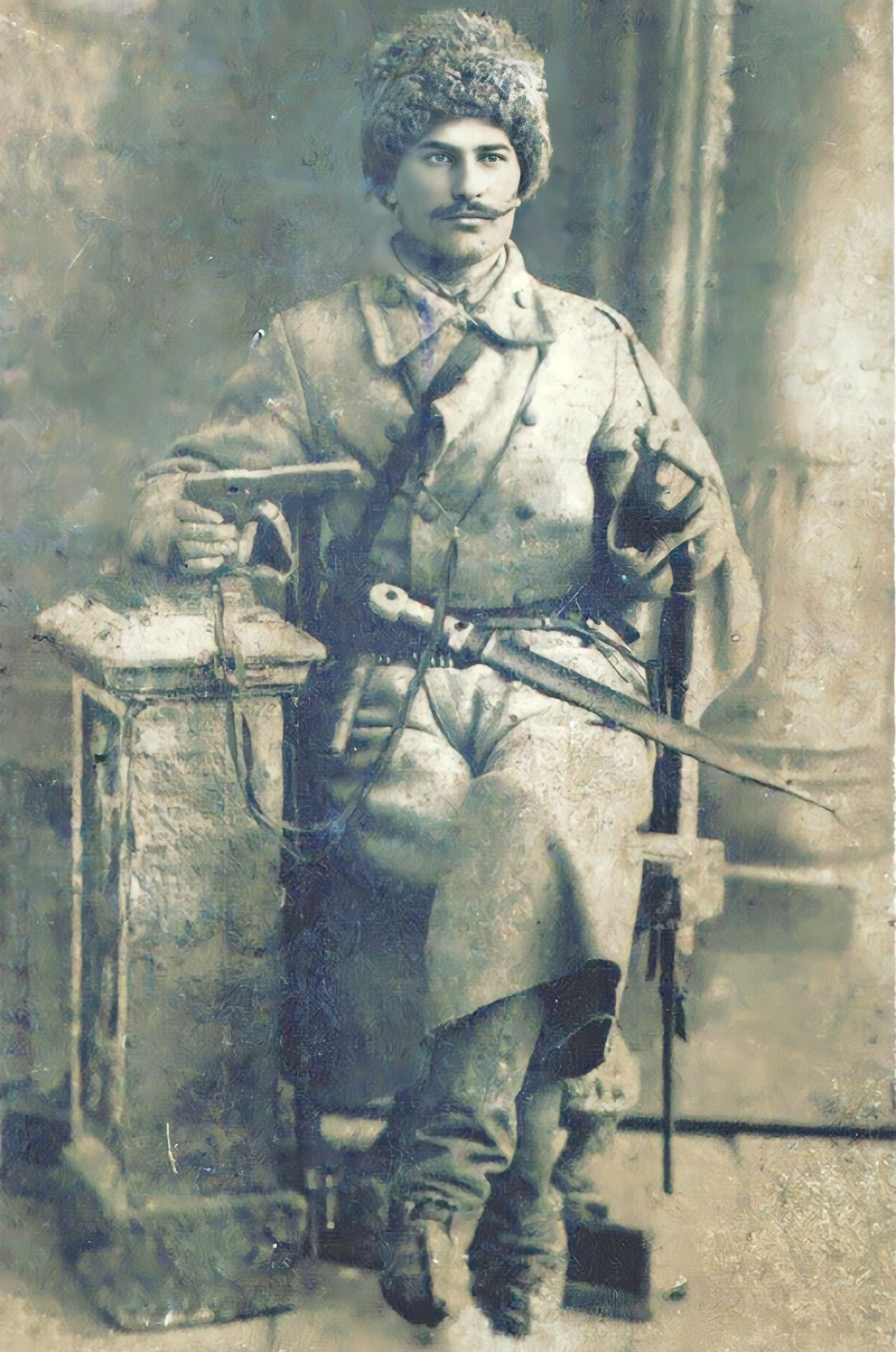
- Shataev in 1918
- Born: 1896; Kurchaloy, Terek Oblast, Russian Empire
- Died: 13 September 1965 (aged 68–69); Kurchaloy Checheno-Ingush ASSR, RSFSR, USSR
- Occupations: Politician, public figure, statesman
- Years active: 1918 - early 1962
- Awards: Badge for the Hundred-day battles for the city of Grozny (40 years old)

Magomed Shotaevich Shataev (Note: Russian: Магомед Шотаевич Шатаев; Chechen: ШотӀи-КӀант Мохьмад) (c. 1896 − 1965) was a Chechen public figure of the Soviet period.

== Biography ==
In the Civil War of 1917-1923, Shataev took part in the hundred-day battles for Grozny and the capture of the Vedeno fortress. He later was involved in administrative and political work in the ChAO, ChI AO, and ChI ASSR. During the Great Purge, he was accused of organizing an armed uprising, was sentenced to death. The sentence was eventually commuted to imprisonment and Shataev was sent to the Gulag and tortured. In 1944, he was deported from the Caucasus.

In the period of the Khrushchev Thaw, he advocated for the rehabilitation of the Vainakhs, their return from deportation, and the restoration of Checheno-Ingushetia. Together with Ingush writer Idris Bazorkin and Chechen linguist Iunus Desheriev, Shataev was a member of the Vainakh delegation that met with Anastas Mikoyan in the Kremlin in June 1956. The meeting with Mikoyan eventually resulted in the creation by the government of the commission for the restoration of the Checheno-Ingush ASSR. Shataev became the first of the Chechens to achieve a mandate allowing him to visit his homeland after deportation. In his youth, he was friends with Abdurakhman Avtorkhanov and was his colleague. After the dissolution of the Soviet Union in 1991, Avtorkhanov often mentioned Magomed in his radio interviews as his friend.

== Legacy ==
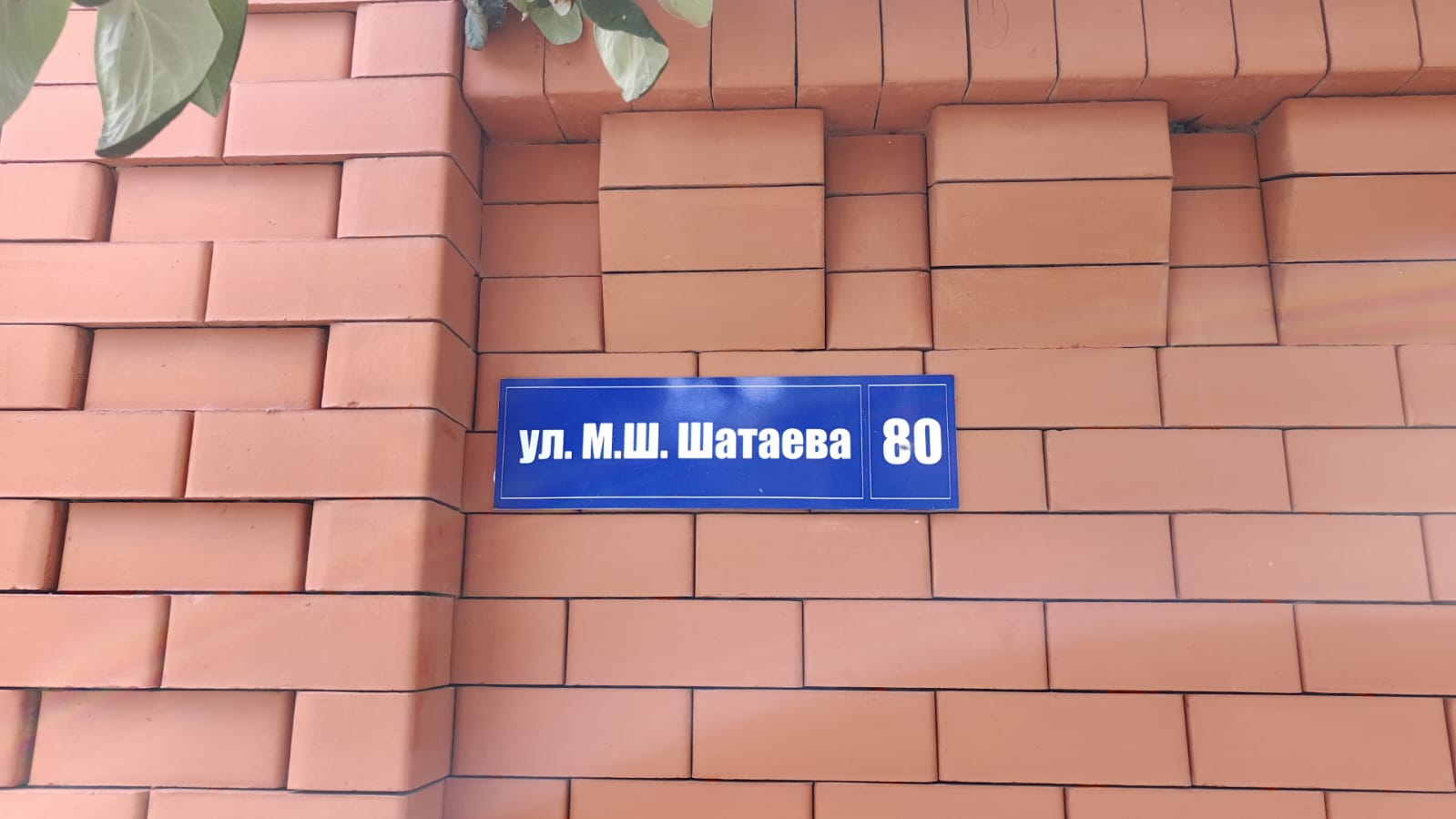
Shataev street in Grozny.

A street in the city of Kurchaloy was named after Shataev. In December 2022 his name was assigned to one of the streets of Grozny (former Chernoglaz street).

== See also ==
- Tovbolat Kurchaloevsky
