= Bersa Sheikh =

Chechen sheikh (1561–1623)

Sheikh Bersa Sheikh (Ducha)
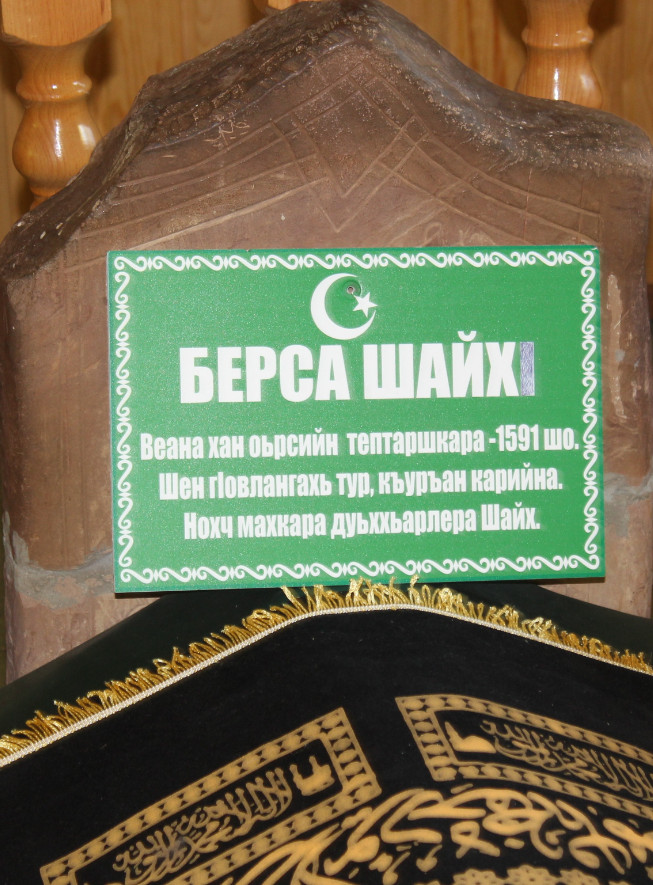
- Grave of Bersa-Sheikh
- Title: Sheikh

Personal life
- Born: Ducha; 1561 Guni/Guni, Vedensky District, Chechnya
- Died: 1623 (aged 61–62) Nizhny Kurchali, Vedensky District, Chechnya
- Resting place: Ziyarat of Bersa Sheikh, Nizhny Kurchali, Chechnya
- Home town: Nizhny Kurchali
- Parents: Timirbulat (father); Chilla (mother)
- Era: Modern
- Education: Unknown

Religious life
- Religion: Islam
- Denomination: Sunni
- Lineage: Kurchaloy

Bersa-Sheikh (born Ducha; Chechen: Берса-Шайх; (Note: Full name: Курчалой Тимарболтин Берса-Шайх, romanized: Kurchaloy Timarboltin Bersa-Sheikh.) c. 1561 – 1623) was a Chechen sheikh and one of the first Islamic preachers in Chechnya who played a major role in the Islamisation of the Chechens of Nakhch-Mokhk (Ichkeria). Bersa-Sheikh was a friend and associate of Termaol Shaykh, one of the preachers of Islam in Chechnya around 1607 (according to another version in 1590).

== The family tree ==
Genealogical tree of the Kurchaloyans from Nashkh came Kushul. Kushul — Kurchalha (12th century) — Khanbilha — Chabalkha — Chaykha — Chergishkha — Begal — Oku — Tovla — Maila (Maig) — Tovbolat — Tembolat — Timirbolat — Bersa (the first preacher of Islam — 1561.) — Turlo — Abbas — Mokhmad-ela — Murtaz-ela — Aidamir — Edalgir — Bulun Botakh (naib in Ichkeria — 1858).

== Background ==
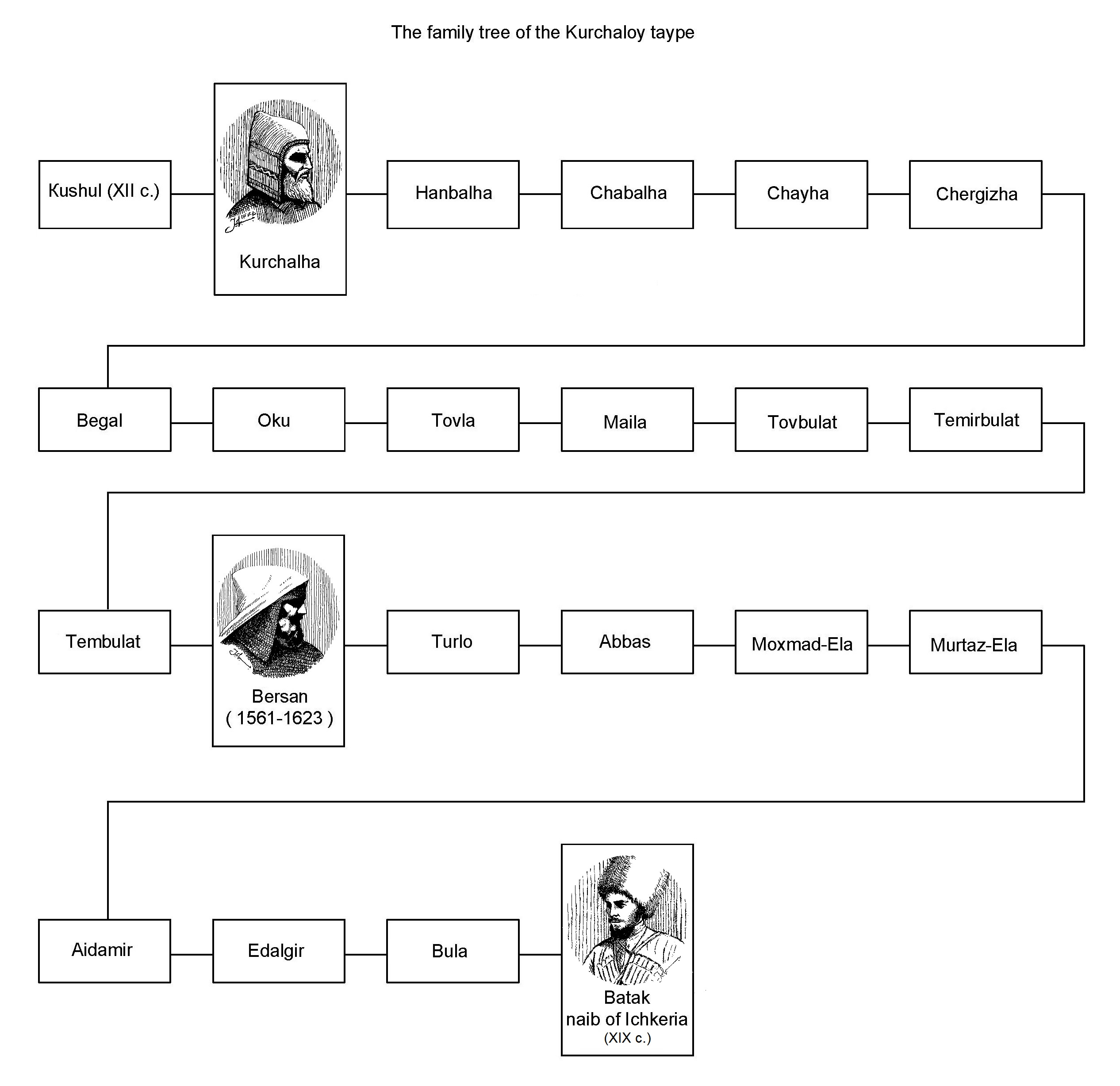
Family tree of Kurchaloy clan

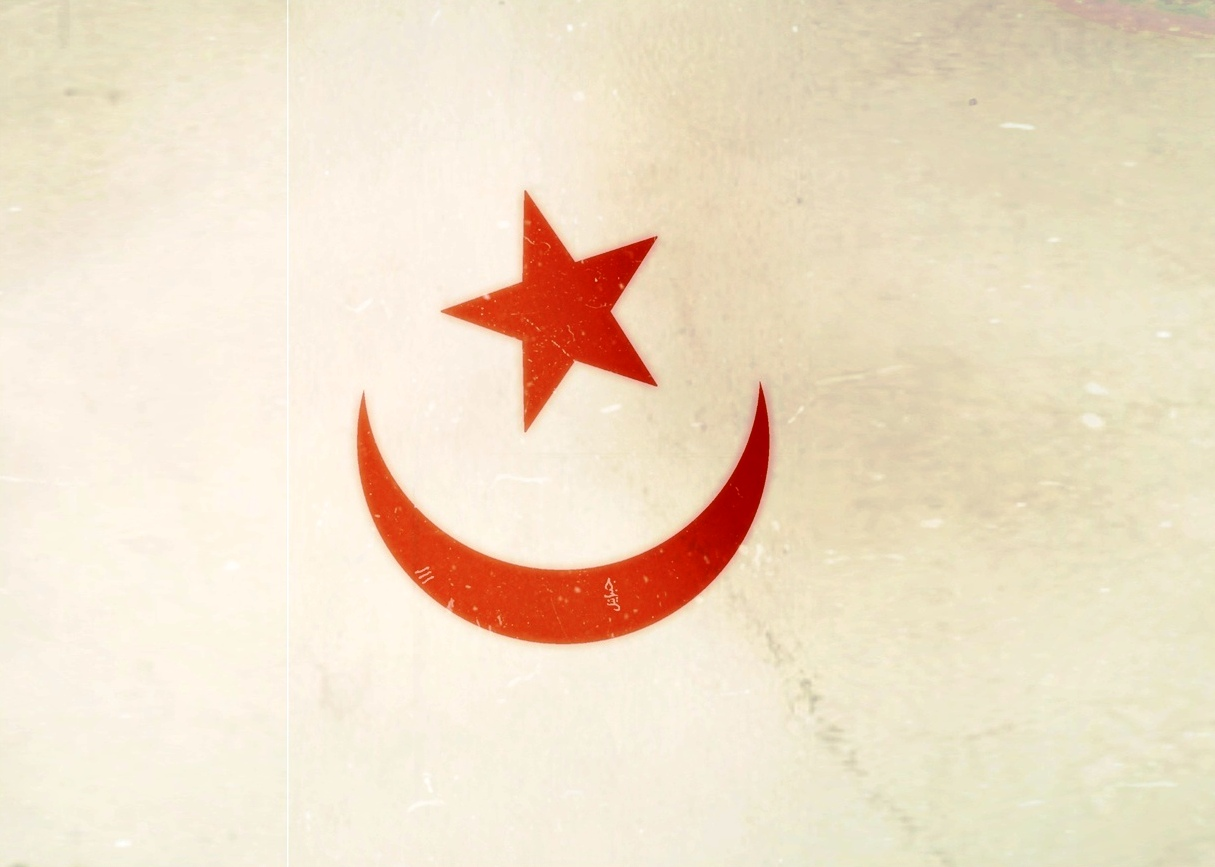
The Banner in the ziyarat of Bersa-Sheikh before 1996

Bersa-Sheikh was born as Duchi into Chechen family of the Kurchaloy clan (teip) in the village of Guni (located in present-day Vedensky District, Chechenya) in 1561. His father Timirbulat died before he born while his mother Chill was a Gunoi toastmaster. Until the age of fifteen, Bersa-Sheikh grew up in the home of Orza, his uncle from the mother's side. He was left fatherless early on, brought up by his mother at her in-laws in the village of Guni, where his mother had gone after the death of her husband. When Bersa was fifteen, he returned to his father's home. Bersa was married to a girl from his native aul, but the mother of his sons was a native of the village of Benoy.

== Conversion to Islam ==
Bersa-Sheikh, being still young, went to Dagestan to the aul Kazi-Kumukh, with the purpose of learning Arabic grammar; after a short time, having made great progress, he returned home and lived without distinguishing himself in any particular way. According to other sources, he accepted Islam and the grace of a sheikh at the request of a dying Dagestani sheikh who led a Gazi raid on his native village of Bersan and fell by his hand.

== Islamization of Chechnya ==
The first aul in Ichkeria to convert to Islam was Kurchali, Bersan's hometown; then little by little other surrounding auls began to follow this doctrine, in which the new sheikh began to teach the people who, like Bersan himself, had been without faith, without law.»

According to military historian И. D. Popko:

Sheikh-Bersan's name lives in Chechen memory as a zealous preacher of the Koran, a natural Chechen, of the Nakhche or Nokhchi tribe. He received his religious education from the ulema at the tomb of Abu Muslim, who brought the religion (prophet) to Dagestan from Arabia in the eighth or ninth century and was honoured as a saint. Armed with theological scholarship and adorned with the title of sheikh, the Chechen Bersan returned to his homeland and became a preacher of the new faith. The influence of Sheikh Bersan was so strong that the Chechens themselves threw those who did not submit to his teachings and did not want the luxuries of the other world down from the high cliff near the village of Gunoy into the deep gorge of Djordje Bero, from where they had to plunge deeper into dzhegennem (hell).

Umalat Laudayev, wrote «when Islamism was finally established among the Chechens, a certain Bersa (Bersan) of the Kirchala family stood at the head of the people; he had influence among the people and was called imam and sheikh».

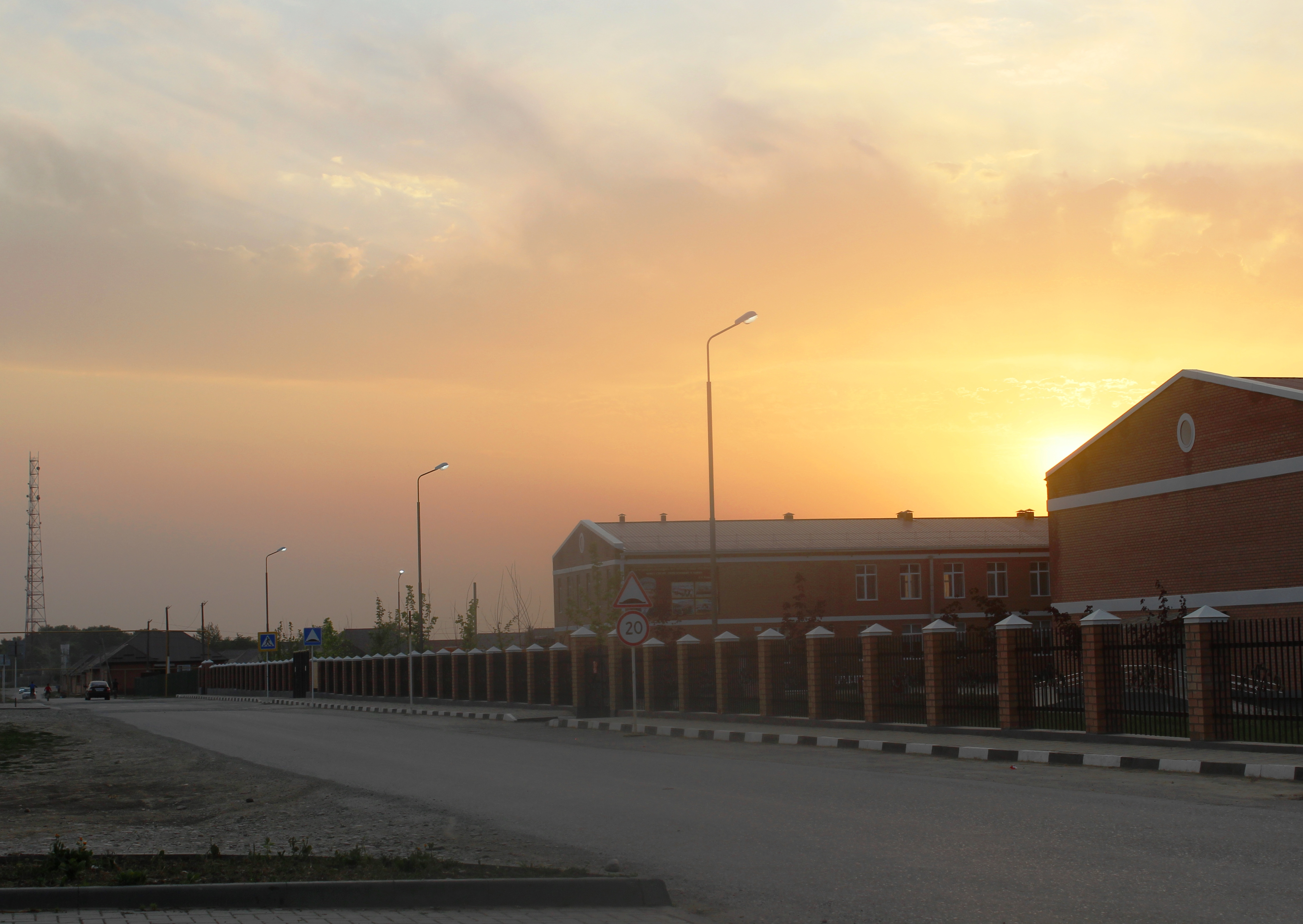
Bersa-Sheikh Street in the town of Kurchaloy.

The Chechen historian Yavus Zaindievich Akhmadov notes that in the immediate neighbourhood of Nakhch-Mokhk beyond the Aksai River was the Okotsk land (possession of the Isherimovs in the 16th century, the Aukhov society), whose population was the first of all Nakhs to embrace Islam. Thus, Muslim burials in one of the villages of the society, Gachalk, are confidently dated to the 16th century. Shikh-Murza Isherimov, the ruler of the Okotsk possession, used to make a «shert» (i.e. an oath on the Koran) to the Moscow tsar.

According to Ya. Akhmadov, there is ambiguity as to whether his activities were related to the actual adoption of Islam, or to its establishment in Nakhch-Mokhk in the Sufi interpretation. He also reports that according to I. M. Popov, Bersa received the sheikh's right of grace from the hands of a Dagestani sheikh named Gad, whom he had killed, who «in the name of Allah bequeathed to him the power of … [ his] word …».

== Death ==
He is buried in his native village of Nizhniye Kurchali, on his homestead. His brother's wife and children are buried with him. Not far from his grave are the burial places of Mustap-Sheikh and Zhansari, wife of Kunta-Khadji. Ya. Akhmadov reports an Arabic-language inscription on the stone, which is 17th century-style, stating, «Here [rests] Bersan».

== Family ==
His wife was from Benoy, belonging to the Benoy teip. She bore Bersa sons Thurlo and Ärsamak.

== Legacy ==
- A street in the village of Nizhny Kurchali
- A street in the town of Kurchaloi
- In Nozhai-Yurtovsky District, the mountain Bersan-Lam
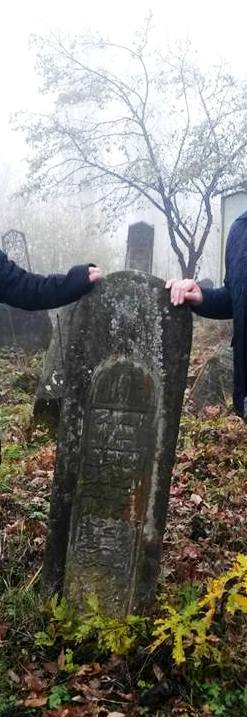
A 19th-century grave monument in the mountainous Kurchali, with Bersa Sheikh's family tree inscribed on the stone.

== Bibliography ==
=== Russian sources ===
- Ахмадов Я. З. Очерк исторической географии и этнополитического развития Чечни в XVI—XVIII веках. — АН Чеченской Республики. — М.: Благотворительный фонд поддержки чеченской литературы, 2009. Архивная копия от 12 августа 2017 на Wayback Machine
- Aytberov, T. M.; Khapizov, Sh. M. (2016). "Эпиграфические источники по истории распространения ислама в Чечне (XVI XIX вв.)". Izvestiya SOIGSI (in Russian) (20 (59)). Vladikavkaz: SOIGSI: 15–24.
- Попко И. Д. Терские казаки со стародавних времён (Исторический очерк). — Вып. 1. — СПб.: Тип. Кулиша, 1880. — 518 с.
- Попов И. М. Предисловие // Сборник сведений о кавказских горцах : [рус. дореф.] = Сборникъ свѣдѣній о Кавказскихъ горцахъ : сб. в 4 вып. — Издаваемый с соизволения Е.И.В. Главнокомандующего Кавказскою Армией при Кавказском Горском Управлении. — Тифлис : Тип. Главного Управления Наместника Кавказского, 1870. — Вып. IV. — С. 13–14.
- Тесаев З. А. Институт «Мехк-Дай» в истории Чечни (Х\ I — 1-и треть XIX в.). — Грозный: Академия наук Чеченской Республики; ФГУП Издательско-полиграфический комплекс «Грозненский рабочий», 2019. — 688 с. — 1000 экз. — ISBN 978-5-4314-0386-6.
