= Goab =

Goab Гоаб
- Selo
- Location within Republic of Dagestan Location within Russia
- Coordinates: 42°05′N 46°44′E
- Country: Russia
- Region: Republic of Dagestan
- District: Charodinsky District
- Time zone: UTC+3:00

Goab (Russian: Гоаб) is a rural locality (a selo) in Charodinsky District, Republic of Dagestan, Russia. Population: 242 (2021 census); 203 (2002 census); 222 (1989 Soviet census). There is 1 street in this selo.

== Geography ==
Selo is located 17 km from Tsurib (the district's administrative centre), 116 km from Makhachkala (capital of Dagestan) and 1,695 km from Moscow. Gilib is the nearest rural locality.
