= Ilaskhan-Yurt =

Ilaskhan-Yurt Иласхан-Юрт
- Selo
- Location within Chechnya Location within Russia
- Coordinates: 43°16′44″N 46°05′54″E
- Country: Russia
- Region: Chechen Republic
- District: Kurchaloyevsky District

Population (2010)
  - Total: 5,041
- Time zone: UTC+3:00

Ilaskhan-Yurt (Russian: Иласхан-Юрт; Chechen: Илсхан-Йурт, Ilsxan-Yurt) is a rural locality (a selo) in the Kurchaloyevsky District in the Chechen Republic, Russia. Population: 5,041 (2010 census); 4,486 (2002 census);
