= Kurchaloy =

Kurchaloy Курчалой
- Town

Other transcription(s)
  - Chechen: Курчалой
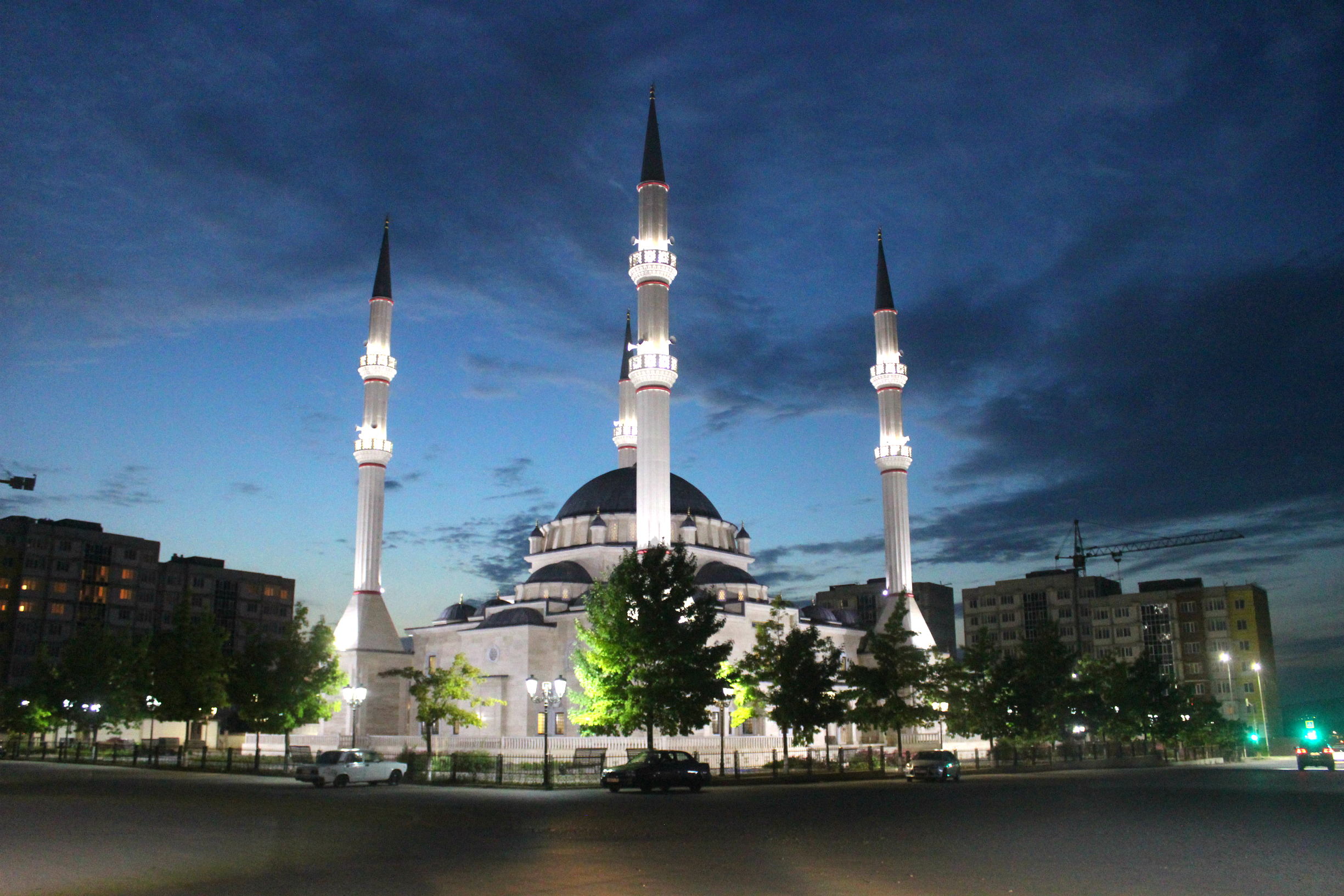
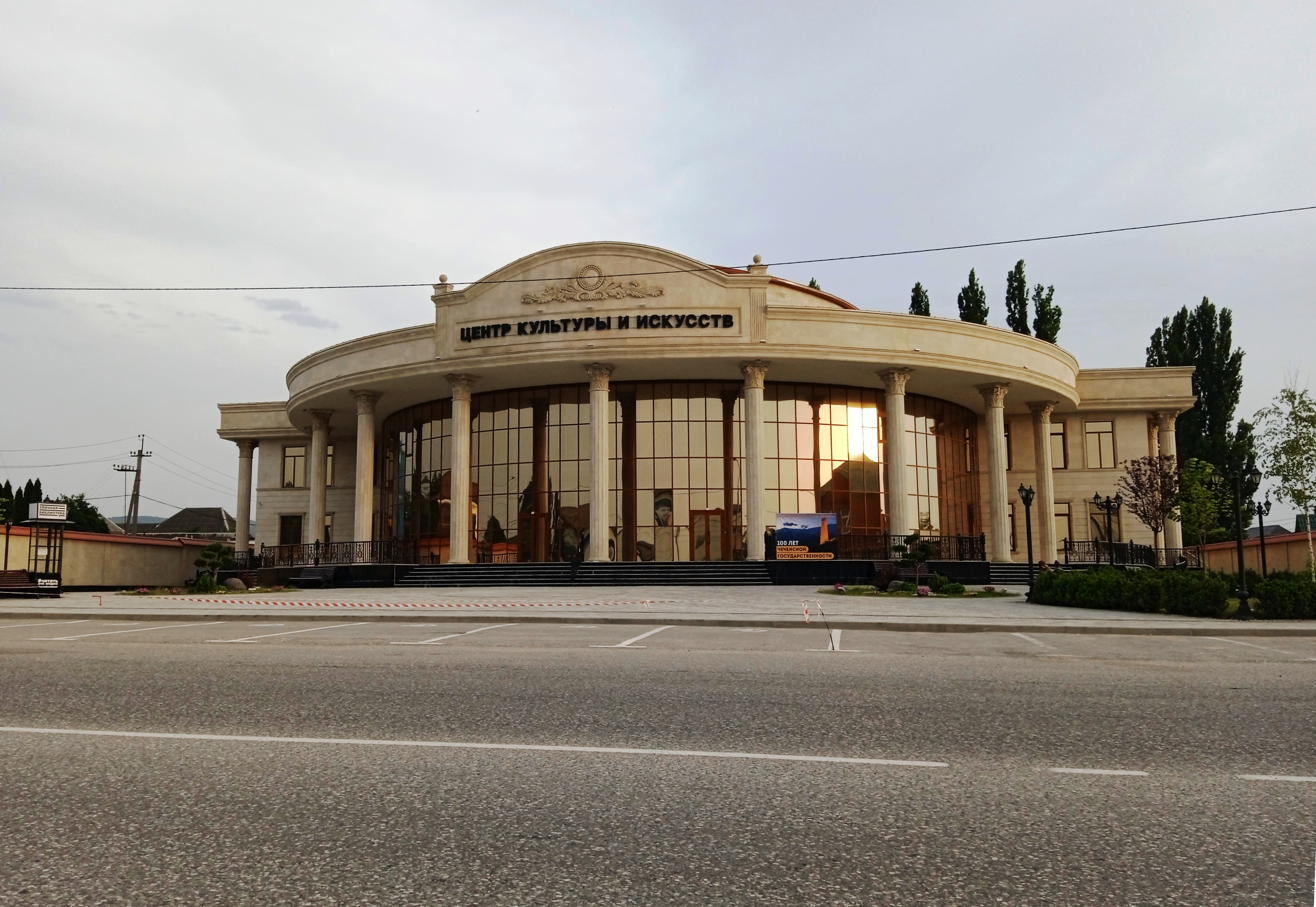
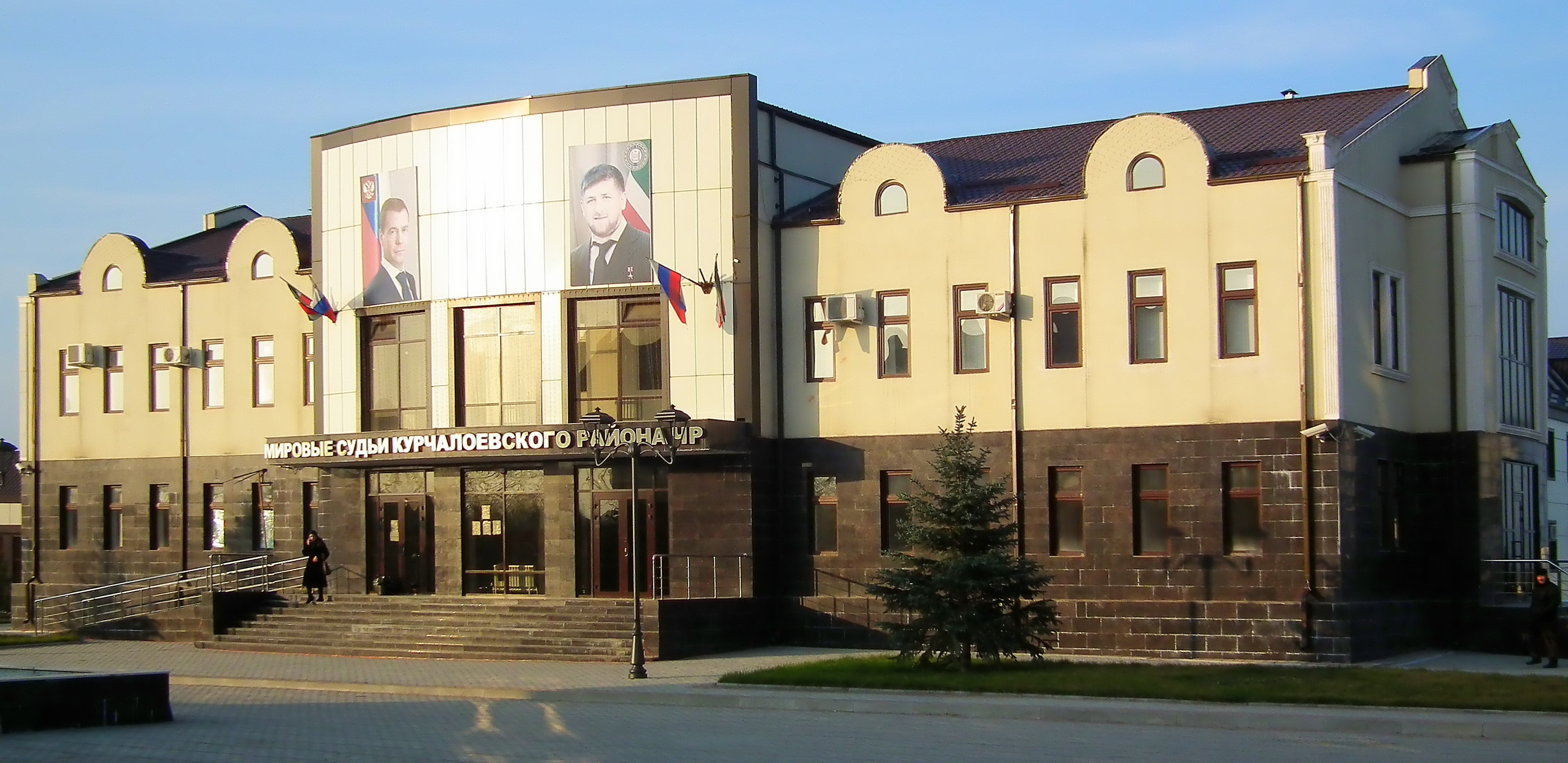
- From the top, Kurchaloy Mosque, Kurchaloyevsky District House of Culture, Centre of Justice & Peace
- Interactive map of Kurchaloy
- Location of Kurchaloy Kurchaloy (Chechnya)
- Country: Russia
- Federal subject: Chechnya
- Administrative district: Kurchaloyevsky District
- Town administrationSelsoviet: Kurchaloy
- Elevation: 169 m (554 ft)

Population (2010 Census)
  - Total: 22,723
  - Estimate (2025): 24,271 (+6.8%)

Administrative status
  - Capital of: Kurchaloyevsky District, Kurchaloyevsky Town Administration

Municipal status
  - Municipal district: Kurchaloyevsky Municipal District
  - Urban settlement: Kurchaloyevskoye Urban Settlement
  - Capital of: Kurchaloyevsky Municipal District, Kurchaloyevskoye Urban Settlement
- Time zone: UTC+3 (MSK)
- Postal code: 366314
- OKTMO ID: 96612101001

Kurchaloy (Chechen: Курчалой-ГӀала, Kurçaloy-Ġala; Russian: Курчало́й) is a town and the administrative center of Kurchaloyevsky District, Chechnya. Population: 22,723 (2010 census); 20,857 (2002 census);

== Administrative and municipal status ==
Municipally, Kurchaloy is incorporated as Kurchaloyevsky urban settlement. It is the administrative center of the municipality and is the only settlement included in it. Kurchaloy is also the administrative center of Kurchaloyevsky District.

== Geography ==
Map of Kurchaloyevsky District with Kurchaloy highlighted

The town of Kurchaloy is located in the foothill plains, on the right bank of the Gumsa, a tributary of the Sunzha. It is located 12 kilometres (7.5 mi) south of the town of Gudermes and 32 kilometres (20 mi) south-east of the city of Grozny.

The nearest settlements to Kurchaloy are Ilaskhan-Yurt to the north, Mayrtup to the east, Dzhigurty to the south-east, Niki-Khita and Dzhaglargi to the south, Avtury to the south-west, and Geldagana to the west.

== History ==
The name of the Chechen teip "Kurchaloy" laid the basis for the name of the city of Kurchaloy.

The ancient village of Kurchal is located in the mountains of the Vedeno region, founded in the 13th century.

Also, the village of Kurchaloy was located on the Gekhi River, which flows into the Sunzha, just north of the village of Alkhan-Yurt. The old village of Kurchaloy was destroyed during the Caucasian War, on 12 April 1826.

According to A. P. Berger for 1850, Kurchaloy is a large settlement.

In 1944, after the genocide and deportation of the Chechen and Ingush people and the Chechen-Ingush ASSR was abolished, the village of Kurchaloy was renamed to Chkalovo, after Valery Chkalov, and settled by people from other ethnic groups. From 1944 to 1957, it was a part of the Grozny Oblast.

In 1957, when the Vaynakh people returned and the Chechen-Ingush ASSR was restored, the village regained its old name, Kurchaloy.

=== City status ===
Until gaining city status in January 2019, Kurchaloy was the largest rural settlement in Chechnya.

On 13 February 2018, it was reported that the Chechen government intended to give the village of Kurchaloy the status of a town, and to include the nearby settlement of Mayrtup in it.

On 4 October 2018, the process of converting the village of Kurchaloy into a town began. However, Mayrtup was not to be included into Kurchaloy.

On 29 December 2018, the law was passed which confirmed that Kurchaloy would become a town. The law came into force on 9 January 2019.

== Population ==
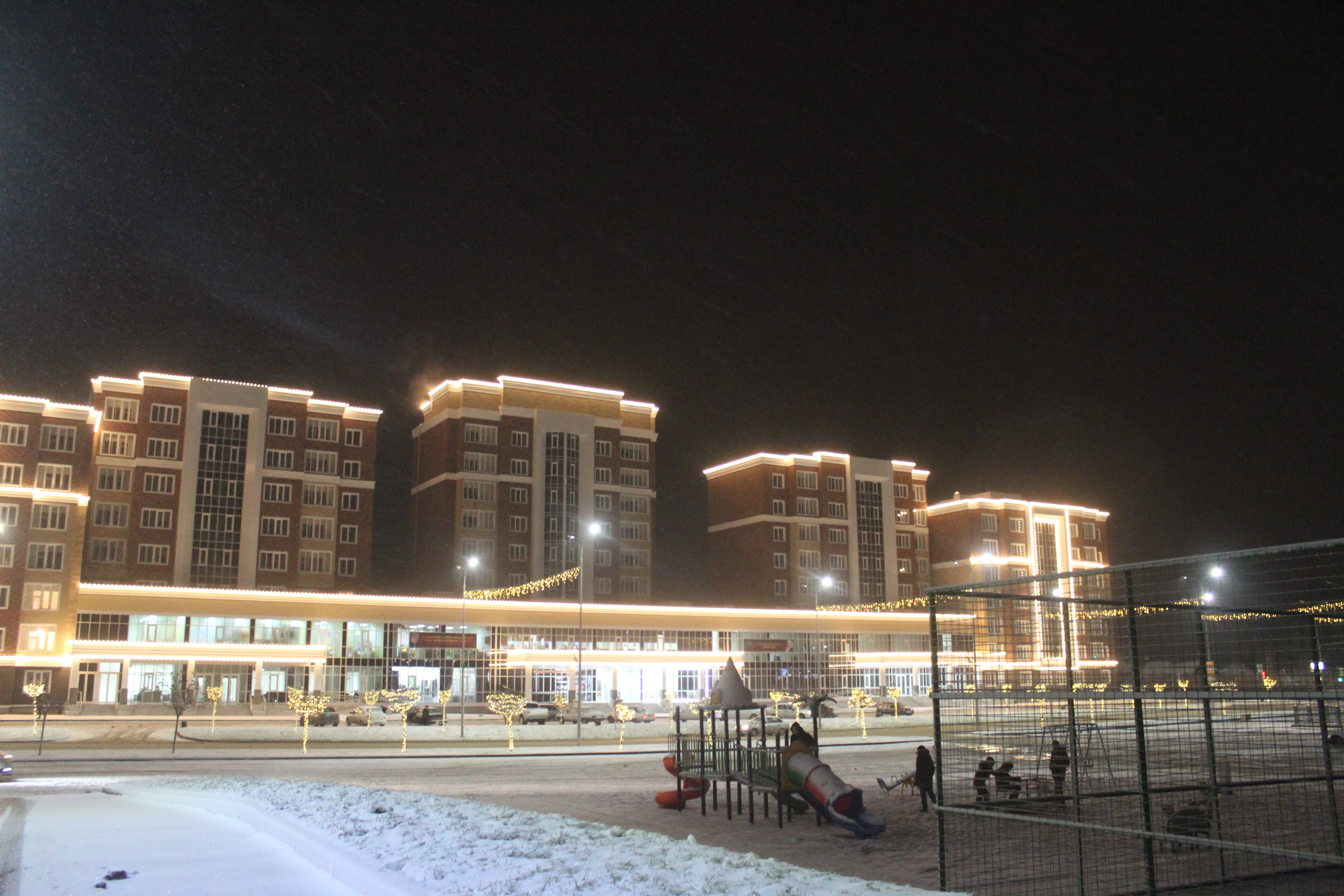
New residential complex in Kurchaloy, 2020

- 1939 Census: 3,643
- 1959 Census: 5,104
- 1970 Census: 7,317
- 1979 Census: 8,437
- 1989 Census: 9,906
- 2002 Census: 20,857
- 2010 Census: 22,723
- 2020 estimate: 26,581

According to the results of the 2010 Census, the majority of residents of Kurchaloy (22,669 or 99,76%) were ethnic Chechens.

== Economy ==
The economy of Kurchaloy is dominated by agriculture, mostly the cultivation of crops and sugar beets. Most of the existing agricultural processing enterprises were damaged or destroyed during the Chechen Wars.

There is one electro-mechanical plant in Kurchaloy, which produces energy-saving lighting equipment. The plant started its operations on 1 January 2013 and produces universal LED lights.

== Education ==
- Kurchaloy Islamic Institute

== Notable people ==
- Tovbolat Kurchaloevsky, was a Chechen outlaw (abrek) and military figure who participated in the Caucasian War.
- Magomed Shataev, public figure
