= Kurchaloyevsky District =

Kurchaloyevsky District Курчалоевский район (Russian)
- District

Other transcription(s)
  - Chechen: Курчалойн кӀошт
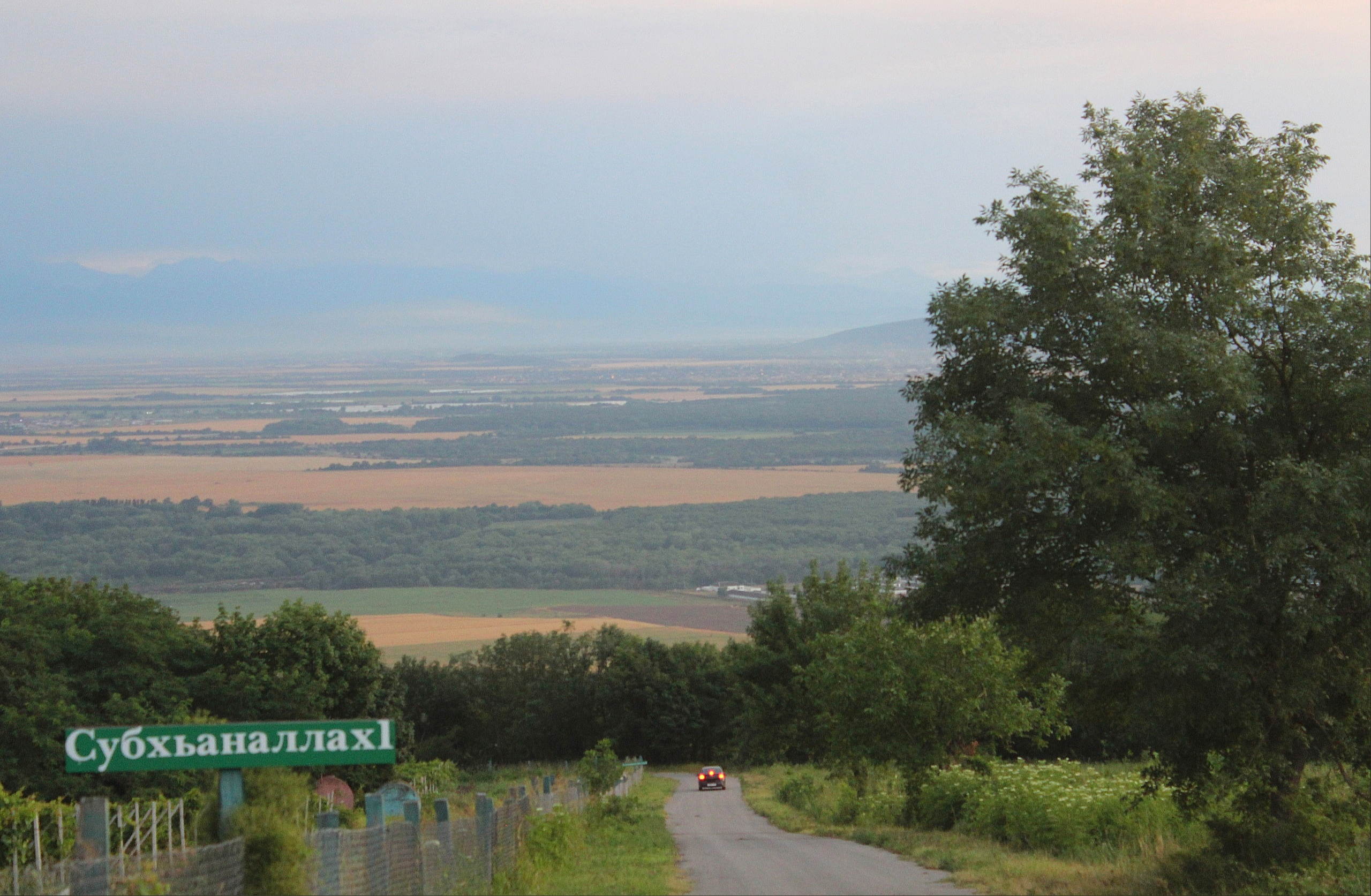
- Kurchaloevsky district

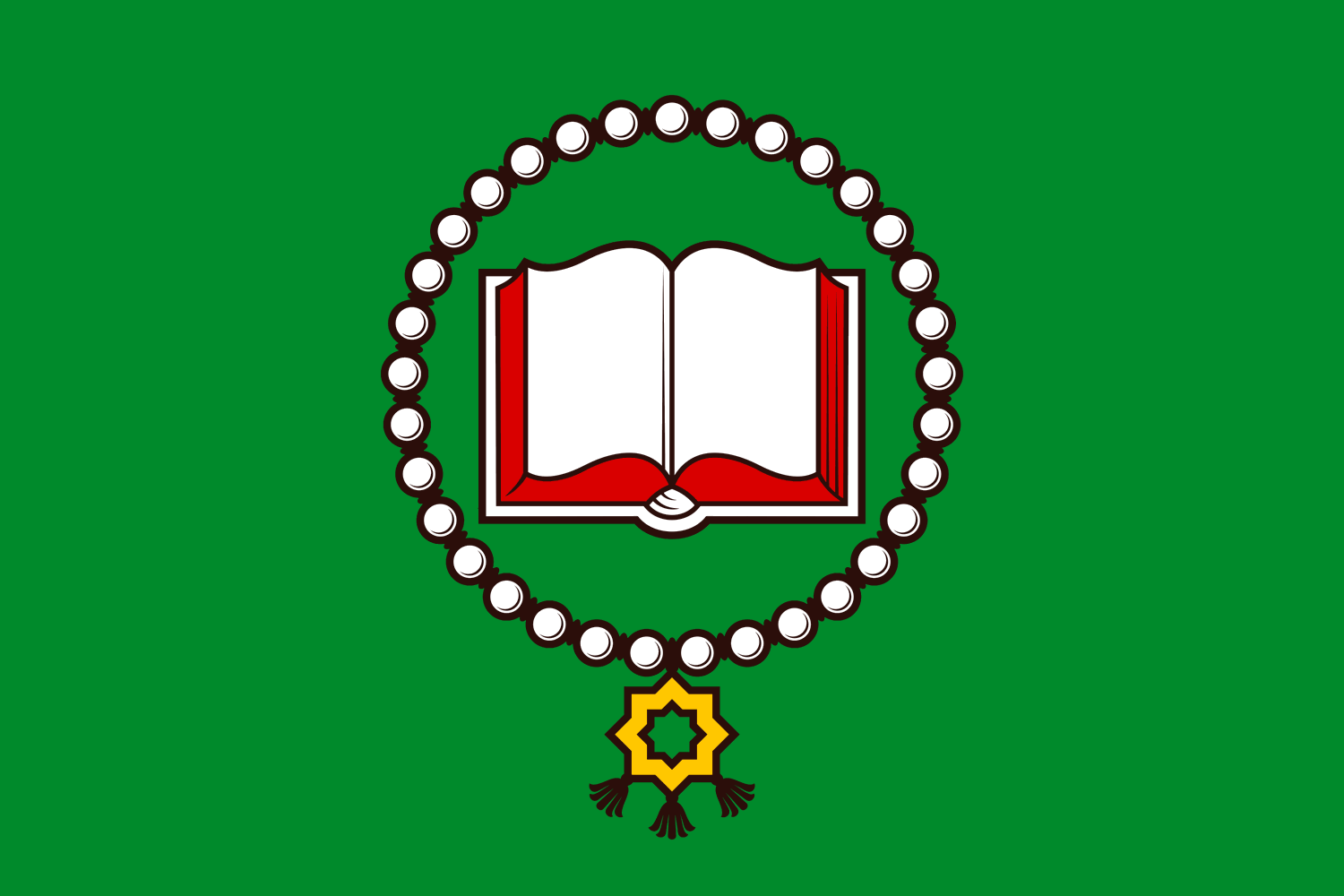
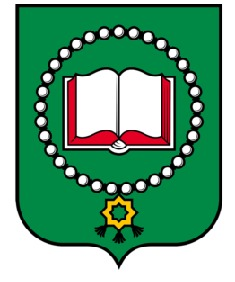
- Flag Coat of arms
- Location of Kurchaloyevsky District in the Chechen Republic
- Coordinates: 43°12′08″N 46°05′24″E
- Country: Russia
- Federal subject: Chechen Republic
- Established: 23 January 1935
- Administrative center: Kurchaloy

Area
  - Total: 975 km^{2} (376 sq mi)

Population (2010 Census)
  - Total: 114,039
  - Density: 117/km^{2} (303/sq mi)
  - Urban: 0%
  - Rural: 100%

Administrative structure
  - Administrative divisions: 13 rural administration
  - Inhabited localities: 20 rural localities

Municipal structure
  - Municipally incorporated as: Kurchaloyevsky Municipal District
  - Municipal divisions: 0 urban settlements, 13 rural settlements
- Time zone: UTC+3 (MSK)
- OKTMO ID: 96612000
- Website: http://admin-kmr.org/

Kurchaloyevsky District (Russian: Курчало́евский райо́н; Chechen: Курчалойн кӀошт, Kurçaloyn khoşt) is one of the fifteen administrative and municipal district (raion), in the Chechen Republic, Russia. The area of the district is 975 square kilometers (376 sq mi) and is located east of the republic. Its administrative center is the town of Kurchaloy. Its population is 114,039 (2010 census); 101,625 (2002 Census). The population of Kurchaloy accounts for 19.9% of the district's total population.

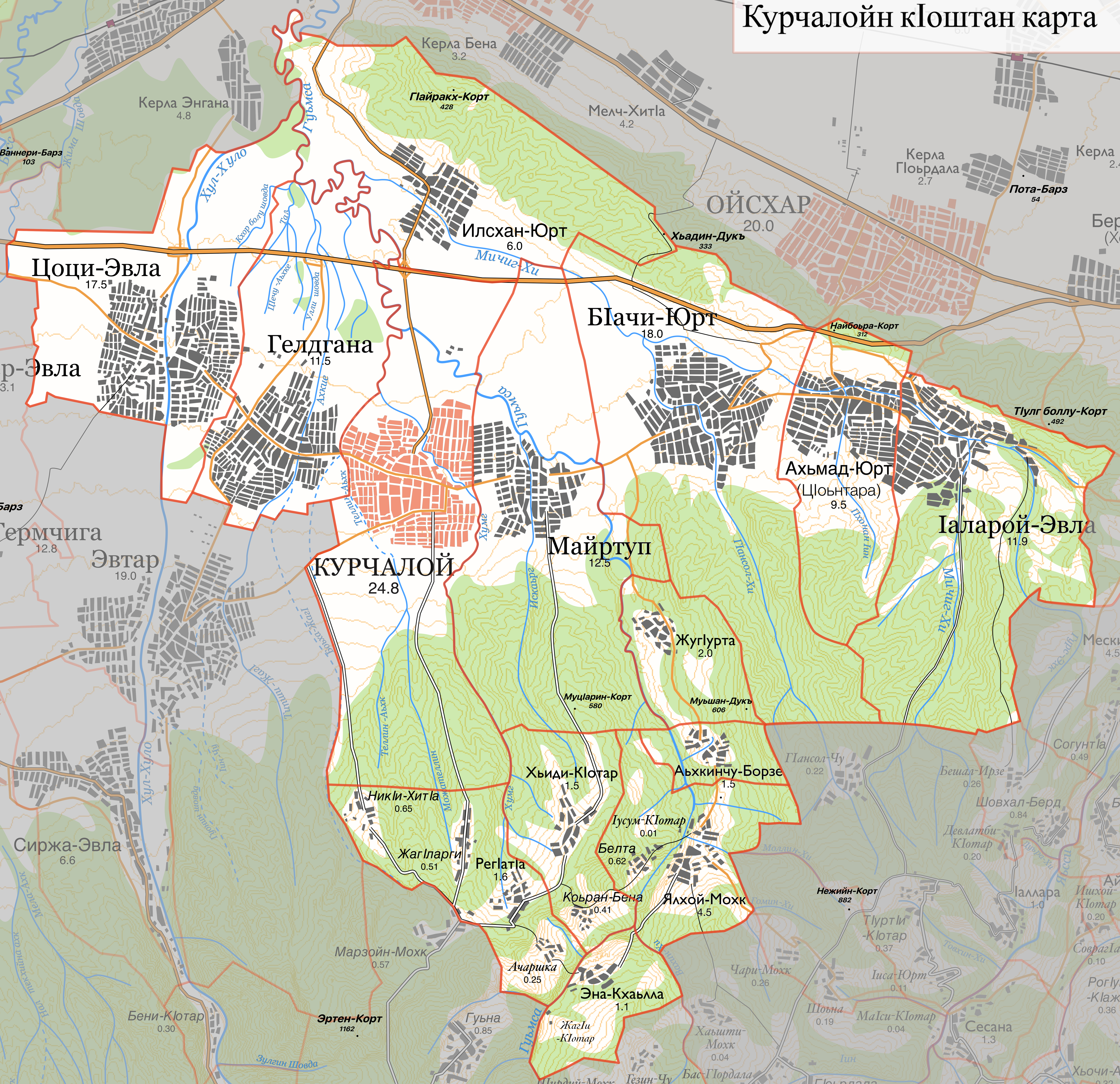
Map of Kurchaloevsky district (in Chechen)

== Healthcare ==
State health facilities are represented by one central district hospital in Kurchaloy and two district hospitals in Tsotsin-Yurt and Alleroy.

== Ethnography and notable people ==
The district is home to Aleroj Teip (associated with the selo of Alleroy), and is a birthplace of both former Chechen president Aslan Maskhadov and former Minister of National Security Turpal-Ali Atgeriyev.
