= Khansultan Dachiev =

Soviet cavalry soldier

Khansultan Chapayevich Dachiev
- Хансултан Чапаевич Дачиев
- Born: 12 December 1922; Gerzel-Aul village, Mountain Republic
- Died: May 2001 (aged 78); Gudermes, Chechnya
- Military career
- Allegiance: Soviet Union
- Branch: Red Army
- Service years: 1941–1946
- Rank: Junior Lieutenant
- Unit: 58th Guards Cavalry Regiment
- Conflicts: World War II
- Awards: Hero of the Soviet Union

Khansultan Chapayevich Dachiev (Chechen: Хансултан Чапаевич Дачиев; 12 December 1922 – May 2001) was a Chechen cavalry soldier of the Red Army during World War II. He was awarded the title Hero of the Soviet Union on 15 January 1944 but later exiled to Jalal-Abad solely on the grounds of his Chechen ethnicity; after writing a letter to Lavrentiy Beria requesting the rehabilitation of the Chechen people he was arrested on manufactured charges of embezzlement and sentenced to twenty years of imprisonment. After his arrest he was stripped of his military medals and his Hero of the Soviet Union title was revoked. He was eventually released, and in 1985 he was granted clemency and his title was reinstated by Mikhail Gorbachev.

== Early life ==
Dachiev was born on 12 December 1922 to a Chechen peasant family in the rural village of Gerzel-Aul, then located within the Chechen Autonomous Oblast (located in present-day Gudermessky District, Russian Federation). After graduating from only five grades of schooling he worked at the local village soviet as a secretary.

== World War II ==
After the German invasion of the Soviet Union in 1941 Dachiev was drafted to serve in the Red Army. He was deployed to the warfront in June 1942, and distinguished himself during the Battle of the Dnieper as a scout in the 58th Guards Cavalry Regiment.

On the night of 23 September 1943, Dachiev and his friend crossed the Dnieper in the vicinity of Nivki village, in Gomel. On the west bank, he located enemy defenses within a two-kilometer area and managed to successfully deliver the information to the regiment headquarters under heavy enemy fire. Dachiev's actions allowed the entire division to cross the Dnieper on 26 September 1943. For doing so he was declared a Hero of the Soviet Union on 15 January 1944, just a few weeks before the repressions of Chechens and Ingush began. Throughout the remainder of the war he served as a platoon commander after graduating from the Novocherkassk Cavalry School with the rank of junior lieutenant.

== Later life ==
In 1946 Dachiev was demobilized from the Red Army and deported to Jalal-Abad in the Kyrgyz SSR on the grounds he was Chechen and therefore a potential traitor, despite the fact that he was a decorated veteran of the war. He worked as a tradesman until his arrest in 1952 on fabricated charges of embezzlement after writing a letter to Lavrenty Beria requesting the rehabilitation of the Chechen people. He was sentenced to 20 years of imprisonment and in 1955 his Hero of the Soviet Union title was revoked by the Supreme Soviet. He served part of his sentence at Vostoklag in the Sverdlovsk Oblast. With the help of a letter by Movlid Visaitov petitioning for clemency, Dachiev was released from prison and moved to Gudermes, Chechnya. His status as a Hero of the Soviet Union was restored and his war medals returned on 21 August 1985 after Mikhail Gorbachev officially rehabilitated him. He died in May 2001 at the age of 78 after suffering two heartattacks. He is survived by 12 grandchildren and seven great-grandchildren.

== See also ==
- Khavazi Muhamed-Mirzaev
- Abukhadzhi Idrisov
- Khanpasha Nuradilov
