= Tsotsi-Yurt =

Rural locality in Kurchaloyevsky District, Chechnya, Russia

Coordinates: 43.238°N 46.000°E

Tsotsi-Yurt (Russian: Цоци-Юрт, Chechen: Цоци-Эвла, Coci-Evla) is a village (selo) in Kurchaloyevsky District, Chechnya.

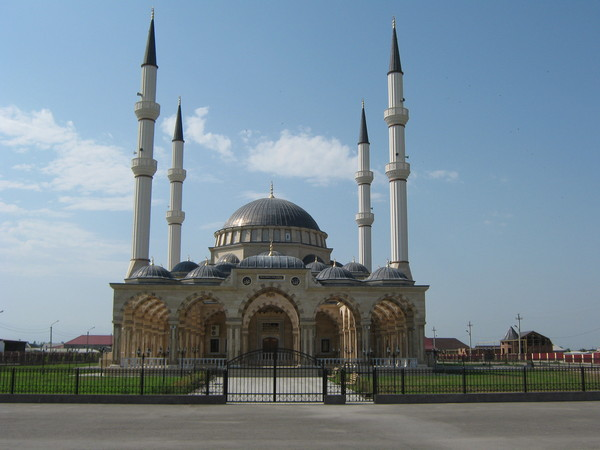
Mosque in Tsotsi-Yurt

== Administrative and municipal status ==
Municipally, Tsotsi-Yurt is incorporated as Tsotsi-Yurtovskoye rural settlement. It is the administrative center of the municipality and the only settlement included in it.

== Geography ==
Map of Kurchaloyevsky District. Tsotsi-Yurt ("Цоци-Юрт") is in the far west

Tsotsi-Yurt is located on both banks of the Khulkhulau River. It is located 4.5 kilometres (2.8 mi) north-west of the town of Kurchaloy and 25 kilometres (16 mi) south-east of the city of Grozny.

The nearest settlements to Tsotsi-Yurt are Dzhalka and Novy Engenoy to the north, Ilaskhan-Yurt to the north-east, Geldagana to the south-east, Avtury to the south, Germenchuk to the south-west, Mesker-Yurt to the west, and the city of Argun to the north-west.

== History ==
According to legend, the village of Tsotsi-Yurt was founded by a man named Tsotsa, a member of the Meskroy teip.

In 1944, after the genocide and deportation of the Chechen and Ingush people and the Chechen-Ingush ASSR was abolished, the village of Tsotsi-Yurt was renamed to Oktyabrskoye and settled by people from the neighbouring republic of Dagestan.

During the early 1990s, the village regained its old Chechen name, Tsotsi-Yurt.

== Population ==
- 2002 Census: 15,935
- 2010 Census: 18,306
- 2018 estimate: 20,317

According to the 2010 census, the majority of residents of Tsotsi-Yurt were ethnic Chechens.

== Infrastructure ==
All of Tsotsi-Yurt is supplied by gas and water pipelines. It lies on the public transport route from Grozny to Kurchaloy.

The village has three schools, several kindergartens and a clinic. There is a small agricultural and industrial economy in the village.
