= Ali Mitayev =

Chechen religious and military commander (1881–1925)

- Али Митаев
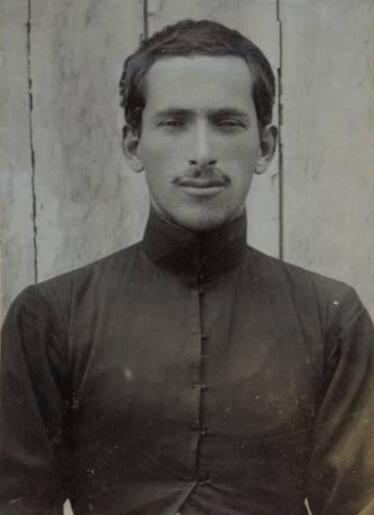
- Mitayev in 1910
- Title: Sheikh

Personal life
- Born: 1881; Avtury, Terek Oblast, Caucasus Viceroyalty
- Died: 1925 (aged 43–44); Rostov-on-Don, Russian SFSR, Soviet Union
- Region: Chechnya

Religious life
- Religion: Sunni Islam
- Military career
- Allegiance: Russian SFSR; Sharia Regiment
- Battles / wars: Russian Civil War; Battle of the Northern Caucasus (1918–1919); 1919–1920 North Caucasus uprising

Ali Bamat-Gireyevich Mitayev (Russian: Али Бамат-Гиреевич Митаев; 1881–1925) was a Chechen religious and military leader. The sheikh of a Sufi tariqa, he was one of the leaders of the Chechen anti-Soviet movement in the 1920s.

Born in the aul of Avtury, Mitayev was educated at a madrasa in Grozny and, in 1912, founded a similar school in his native village. During the Russian Revolution and the ensuing Russian Civil War, Mitayev was one of the most influential Sufi sheikhs in Chechnya and Ingushetia. In 1919 he forged an alliance with the Bolsheviks against the White movement provided the Bolsheviks would guarantee Chechen autonomy and Muslim religious practices within the Soviet system. Mitayev himself joined the Communist Party and became a member of the Chechen revkom. Mitayev's cooperation with the Soviets ended in 1923, when he declared a jihad to the Bolsheviks and attempted a coup. In April 1924 he was arrested as a "counter-revolutionary", "saboteur", and "clerical bourgeois nationalist" and was accused of preparing a joint Georgian-Chechen rebellion against the Soviet rule. He was tried in Rostov-on-Don and shot in 1925.

One of the main murids of Mitayev was Magomed Shataev.
