= Khavazi Muhamed-Mirzaev =

Soviet Chechen staff sergeant (1910–1943)

- Хаваджи Мухамед-Мирзаев
- Born: 1910; Alkhazurovo, Chechnya, Russian Empire
- Died: 4 October 1943 (aged 32–33); Chernihiv, Ukrainian SSR, Soviet Union (present-day Ukraine)
- Military career
- Allegiance: Soviet Union
- Branch: Red Army
- Service years: 1941 − 1943
- Rank: Staff Sergeant
- Unit: 60th Guards Chernigov Cavalry Regiment
- Conflicts: World War II; Eastern Front; Battle of Stalingrad; Battle of the Dnieper †
- Awards: Hero of the Soviet Union

Khavazi Muhamed-Mirzaev (Russian: Хаваджи Мухамед-Мирзаев; 1910 – 4 October 1943) was a Chechen cavalry soldier during World War II who was posthumously awarded the title Hero of the Soviet Union on 15 January 1944.

== Biography ==
Muhamed-Mirzaev was born in 1910 to a Chechen peasant family in Alkhazurovo, Chechnya, of the Russian Empire. After graduating from the Novocherkassk Pedagogical School he was drafted into the Red Army.

== Military service ==
In the early 1930s, after being drafted into the Army he was deployed in the Russian Far East as part of the Border Guards Service of the NKVD. While serving as a border guard he was injured in a fight with a trespasser and demobilized.

In 1940 he graduated from two years of training from the Chief Fire Directorate in Tashkent; he was then assigned as an inspector for the Leninabad city fire department.

== World War II ==
After Germany invaded the Soviet Union with the launch of Operation Barbarossa in 1941, Muhamed-Mirzaev was again drafted into the ranks of the Red Army. He was sent to the Eastern Front as an assistant platoon commander of the 60th Guards Chernigov Cavalry Regiment in the 16th Guards Chernigov Cavalry Division of the 7th Cavalry Corps in the 61st Army on the Central Front in September that same year. He fought in the Battle of Stalingrad.

While approaching the Mensky settlement of Chernigov on 18 September, Muhamed-Mirzaev picked put his machine gun and led his regiment in an attack. On 28 September 1943, Muhamed-Mirzaev was among the first group of soldiers to cross the right bank of the Dnieper in the Gomel region of Belarus. After entering the right bank he opened fire on enemy troops in order to provide cover to other members of his regiment. After being injured in battle he died of wounds on 4 October 1943 and was buried in a mass grave. On 15 January 1944 he was awarded the title Hero of the Soviet Union by decree of the Presidium of the Supreme Soviet for heroism in battle. His name is written on a memorial plaque in Bashkortostan among the 78 Heroes of the Soviet Union from the 60th Guards Chernigov Cavalry Regiment.

== See also ==
- Khanpasha Nuradilov
- Abukhadzhi Idrisov
- Movlid Visaitov
