= Geldagana =

Village in Kurchaloyevsky District, Russia

Coordinates: 43°12′55″N 46°02′25″E

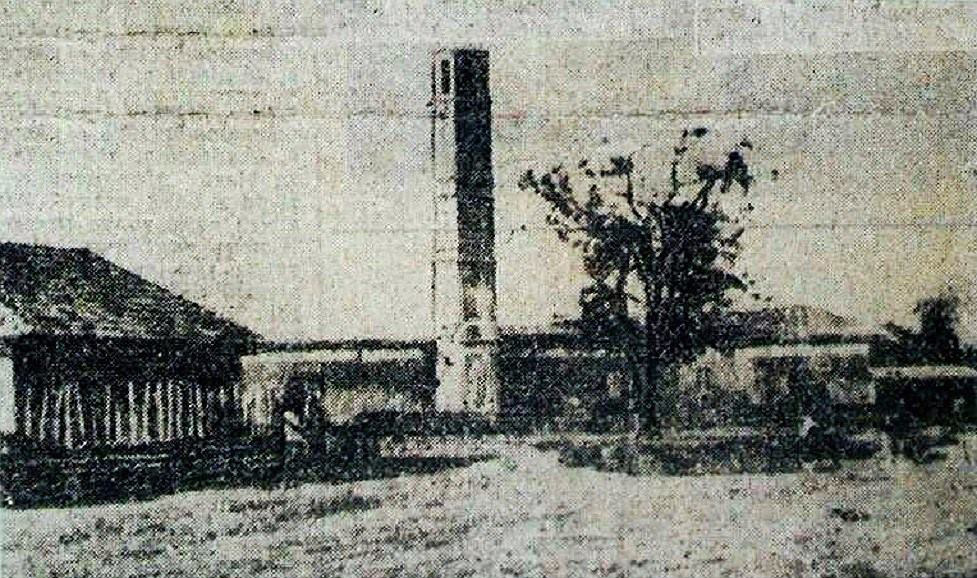
An image of Geldagana

Geldagana (Russian: Гелдагана, Chechen: Гелдагана), also spelled as Geldagan, is a rural locality (a selo) in Kurchaloyevsky District, Chechnya.

== Administrative and municipal status ==
Municipally, Geldagana is incorporated as Geldaganskoye rural settlement. It is the administrative center of the municipality and is the only settlement included in it.

== Geography ==
Map of Kurchaloyevsky District. Geldagana ("Гелдагана") is in the west

Geldagana is located on the right bank of the Khulkhulau River and on both banks of the Akhko River. It is opposite from the town of Kurchaloy and 32 kilometres (20 mi) south-east of the city of Grozny.

The nearest settlements to Geldagana are Ilaskhan-Yurt in the north-east, the town of Kurchaloy in the east, Niki-Khita in the south-east, Avtury in the south-west, Germenchuk in the west, and Tsotsi-Yurt in the north-west.

== History ==
In 1944, after the genocide and deportation of the Chechen and Ingush people and the Chechen-Ingush ASSR was abolished, the village of Geldagana was renamed to Novaya Zhizn (roughly translated from Russian as "New Life") and settled by people from the neighbouring republic of Dagestan.

In the early 1990s, the village regained its old Chechen name, Geldagana.

== Population ==
- 1970 Census: 5,357
- 1979 Census: 5,333
- 1990 Census: 5,020
- 2002 Census: 11,875
- 2010 Census: 12,350
- 2019 estimate: 13,876

According to the results of the 2010 Census, the majority of residents of Geldagana (12,300) were ethnic Chechens, with 50 people from other ethnic groups.
