= Niki-Khita =

Village in Kurchaloyevsky District, Russia

Coordinates: 43°06′56″N 46°04′11″E

Niki-Khita (Russian: Ники-Хита, Chechen: НикIи-ХитIа, Nikhi-Xitha) is a rural locality (a selo) in Kurchaloyevsky District, Chechnya.

== Administrative and municipal status ==
Municipally, Niki-Khita is incorporated into Regitinskoye rural settlement. It is one of four settlements included in it.

== Geography ==
Map of Kurchaloyevsky District. Niki-Khita is in the Regita rural settlement

Niki-Khita is located in the upper reaches of the Bokh-Dzhaga River. It is located 11 kilometres (6.8 mi) south-east of the town of Kurchaloy and 60 kilometres (37 mi) from south-east of the city of Grozny.

The nearest settlements to Niki-Khita are Avtury in the north-west, Geldagana in the north, the city of Kurchaloy in the north-east, Dzhaglargi in the east, Marzoy-Mokhk and Regita in the south-east, and Serzhen-Yurt in the west.

== History ==
In 1944, after the genocide and deportation of the Chechen and Ingush people and the Chechen-Ingush ASSR was abolished, the village of Niki-Khita was renamed and settled by people from the neighboring republic of Dagestan. From 1944 to 1957, it was a part of the Vedensky District of the Dagestan ASSR.

In 1958, after the Vaynakh people returned and the Chechen-Ingush ASSR was restored, the village regained its old Chechen name, Niki-Khita.

== Population ==
- 1990 Census: 318
- 2002 Census: 320
- 2010 Census: 657
- 2019 estimate: ?

According to the results of the 2010 Census, the majority of residents of Niki-Khita were ethnic Chechens.
