= Dzhalka =

Village in Gudermessky District, Russia

Coordinates: 43°19′08″N 45°59′37″E

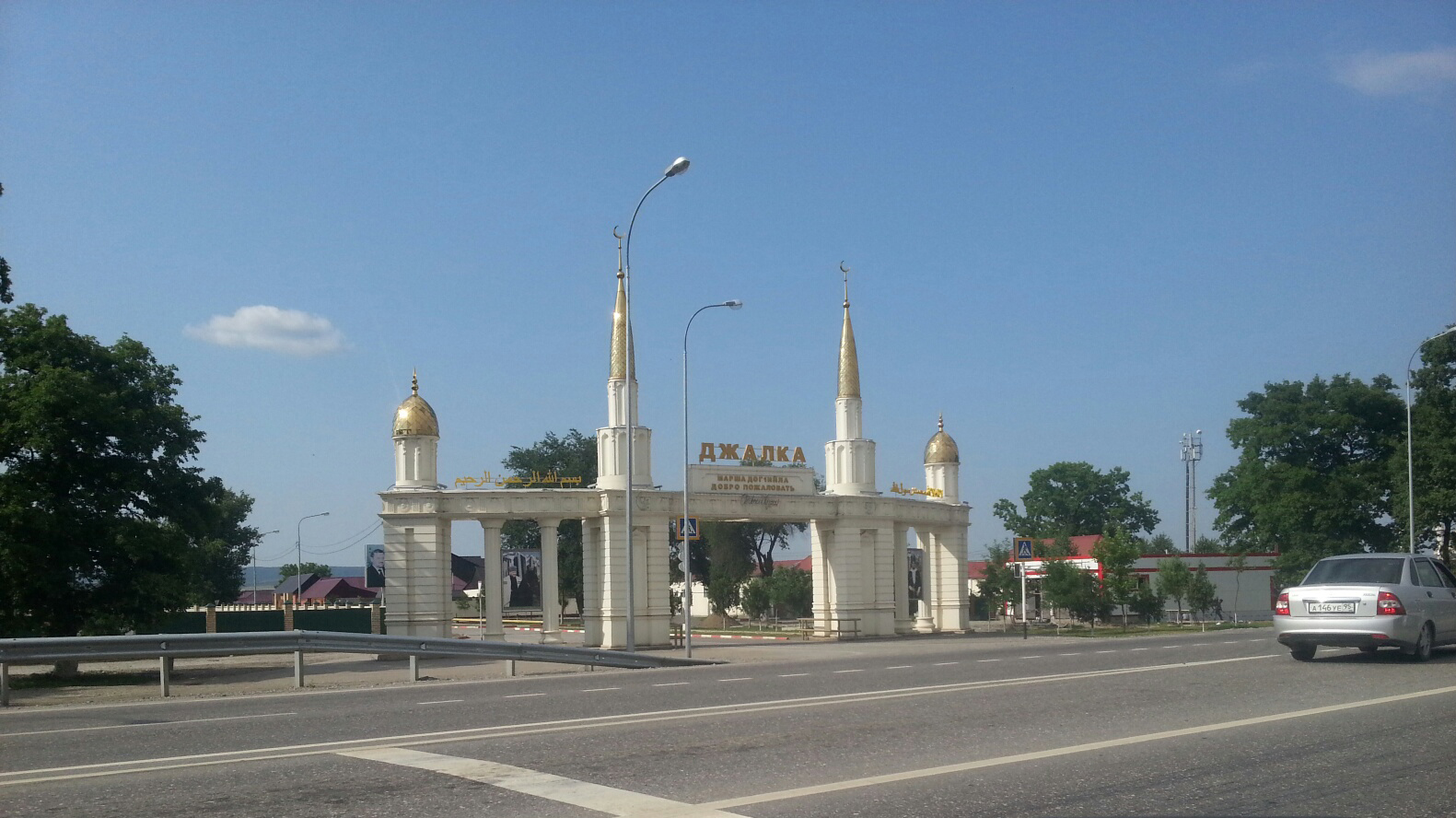
Entry to Dzhalka

Dzhalka (Russian: Джалка, Chechen: Жалкх, Ƶalq) is a rural locality (a selo) in Gudermessky District, Chechnya.

== Administrative and municipal status ==
Municipally, Dzhalka is incorporated as Dzhalkinskoye rural settlement. It is the administrative center of the municipality and is the only settlement included in it.

== Geography ==
Map of Gudermessky District with Dzhalka highlighted

Dzhalka is located on the right bank of the Argun River. It is 5 kilometres (3.1 mi) south-west of the city of Gudermes and 25 kilometres (16 mi) east of the city of Grozny.

The nearest settlements to Dzhalka are Basa-Gala in the north-west, the city of Gudermes in the north-east, Novy Engenoy in the south-east, Tsotsi-Yurt in the south, and Mesker-Yurt in the south-west.

== History ==
In 1944, after the genocide and deportation of the Chechen and Ingush people and the Chechen-Ingush ASSR was abolished, the village of Dzhalka was renamed, and was settled by people from other ethnic groups. From 1944 to 1957, it was a part of Grozny Oblast.

In 1957, when the Vaynakh people returned and the Chechen-Ingush ASSR was restored, the village regained its old name, Dzhalka.

== Population ==
- 1990 Census: 3,104
- 2002 Census: 6,292
- 2010 Census: 7,415
- 2020 estimate: 8,972

According to the results of the 2010 Census, the majority of residents of Dzhalka (7,408 or 99,90%) were ethnic Chechens.

== Teips ==
Members of the following teips live in Dzhalka:

- Aitkalloy
- Allaroy
- Benoy
- Chermoy
- Gordaloy
- Kurchaloy
- Shirdy
- Zandakoy

== Education ==
The village of Dzhalka hosts two secondary schools.
