= Yakub and Aiubkhan Magomadov =

Chechen brothers disappeared by Russia

- Born: Kurchaloy, Checheno-Ingush ASSR, RSFSR
- Known for: Being forcefully "disappeared" by Russian federal forces

Aiubkhan and Yakub Magomadov are two brothers from Kurchaloy, Chechnya. Aiubkhan disappeared in 2000, and Yakub in 2004.

Amnesty International fears that the "disappearance" of Yakub may be connected to his efforts to find his younger brother, detained by Russian federal forces in his home on October 2, 2000, and not seen since. The family searched for him throughout the Russian Federation, eventually lodging a complaint with the European Court of Human Rights in 2001. Yakub told AI delegates in March 2004 about his brother's "disappearance" and the intimidation his family faced after their complaint to the ECHR. His family last saw him in April 2004, when he left Chechnya to travel to Moscow. In September 2005 AI learned that Yakub Magomadov had reportedly been seen alive in August 2005 in detention at the Russian federal forces headquarters at Khankala, where he may be being held secretly and tortured. According to Memorial, two members of Kadyrovtsy (Chechen militia) brought a note from him to his family, saying they would help arrange freeing him for ransom.

In November 2005 their cases were urged towards the European Court by Amnesty and the family of the brothers. On June 12, 2007, the ECHR found the state of Russia guilty of the disappearance and presumed death of Ayubkhan Magomadov in its judgement in the case of Magomadov and Magomadov v. Russia. The Court did not find that his brother Yakub's disappearance in 2004 had anything to do with Yakub's filing a complaint to the European Court.

== See also ==
- Forced disappearance
- List of people who disappeared mysteriously (2000–present)
