= Kurchaloy Islamic Institute =

Islamic educational institution in Chechnya, Russia

Coordinates: 43°11′58″N 46°05′28″E

- Курчалоевский исламский институт им. А-Х. Кадырова
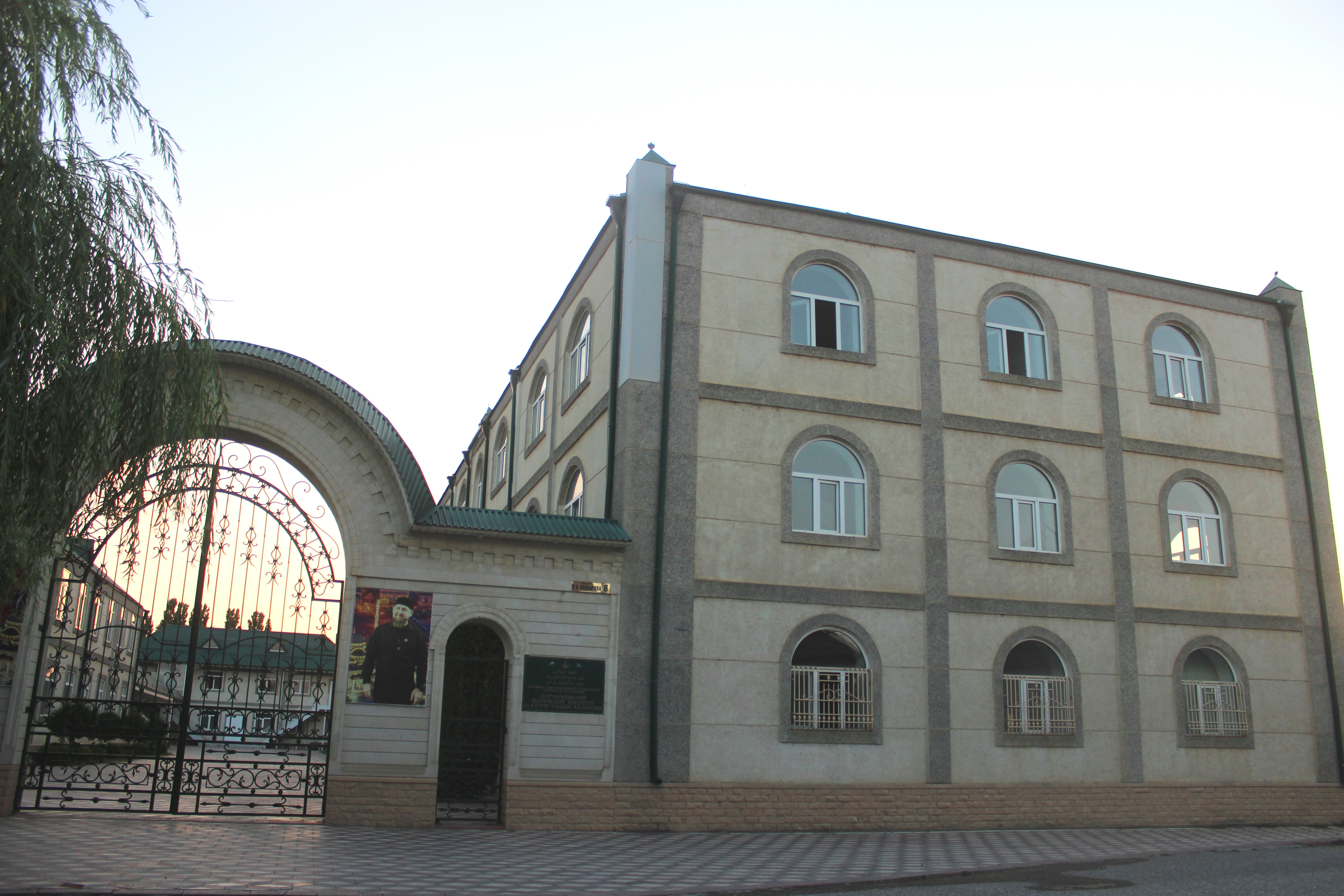
- Type: theological
- Established: 1988
- Rector: Khozh-Ahmed Ibragimov
- Students: 300
- Location: 8 R. A. Kadyrov Street, Kurchaloy, Chechnya, Russia
- Website: kurchaloy-islam-inst.ru

The Kurchaloy Islamic Institute named after A-Kh. Kadyrov (KII; Russian: Курчалоевский исламский институт им. А-Х. Кадырова, КИИ) is a theological islamic organization of higher professional education in Kurchaloy, Chechnya, Russia. It's the first islamic instite in the North Caucasus.

== History ==
In 1988, a religious figure, entrepreneur, philanthropist, Nasuha-Khadzhi Akhmatov founded the first "North Caucasian Madrasah" in the North Caucasus, where everyone had the opportunity to study the canons of the Islamic religion, at the same time he turned to Akhmad Kadyrov for support in order to implement his plans. At that time, Akhmad-Khadzhi Kadyrov was a specialist scientist-theologian. He graduated from the Bukhara "Mir-Arab" Madrasah and the Tashkent Islamic Institute. Initially, the institute was named in honor of the founder of Nasuha-Khadzhi Akhmatov.

On April 29, 1991, the madrasah was transformed into a higher religious educational institution Kurchaloev Islamic institute named Al-Khadzh Nasuh. In 2004, after the death of the President of the Chechen Republic Akhmad-Khadzhi Kadyrov, on the initiative of Nasuha-Khadzhi Akhmatov, the institute was renamed the Kurchaloev Islamic Institute named after A-H. Kadyrov.

In 2007, at the initiative of the President of the Chechen Republic Ramzan Kadyrov, the reconstruction of the Islamic institute was carried out. New buildings were built: administrative and academic building, a dormitory with 220 seats, a dining room and a gym.

== Education ==
Over the years of the institute's existence, more than 700 students with specialties imam theologian and teacher of the Arabic became its graduates. As of 2018, 332 students studied at the institute.
