= Khanpasha Nuradilov =

Soviet machine gunner (1924–1942)

- Chechen: Хампаша Нурадилан-кIант Нурадилов; Russian: Ханпаша Нурадилович Нурадилов
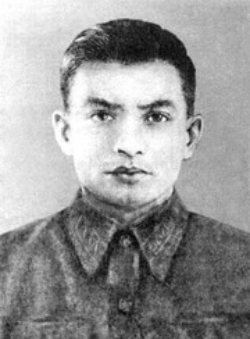
- Born: 6 July 1920; Yaryksu-Aukh village, Khasav-Yurt District, Dagestan, Mountain Republic
- Died: 12 September 1942 (aged 22); Stalingrad, Russian SFSR, Soviet Union
- Military career
- Allegiance: USSR
- Branch: Red Army
- Service years: 1940 – 1942
- Rank: Sergeant
- Unit: 34th Cavalry Regiment
- Conflicts: World War II; Battle of Stalingrad †
- Awards: Hero of the Soviet Union

Khanpasha Nuradilovich Nuradilov (Russian: Ханпаша Нурадилович Нурадилов, Chechen: Хампаша Нурадилан-кIант Нурадилов; 6 July 1920 – 12 September 1942) was a Soviet machine gunner in the Red Army between 1940 and 1942. He is credited with killing an estimated 920 enemy soldiers and capturing 18 soldiers and 7 machine guns. He disappeared in the battle of Stalingrad (1942).

He was a Chechen from Dagestan. As a cavalry sergeant at Stalingrad he led a charge on a German position despite already suffering serious wounds. He was awarded the title of Hero of the Soviet Union by order of the Presidium on 17 April 1943.

== Awards ==
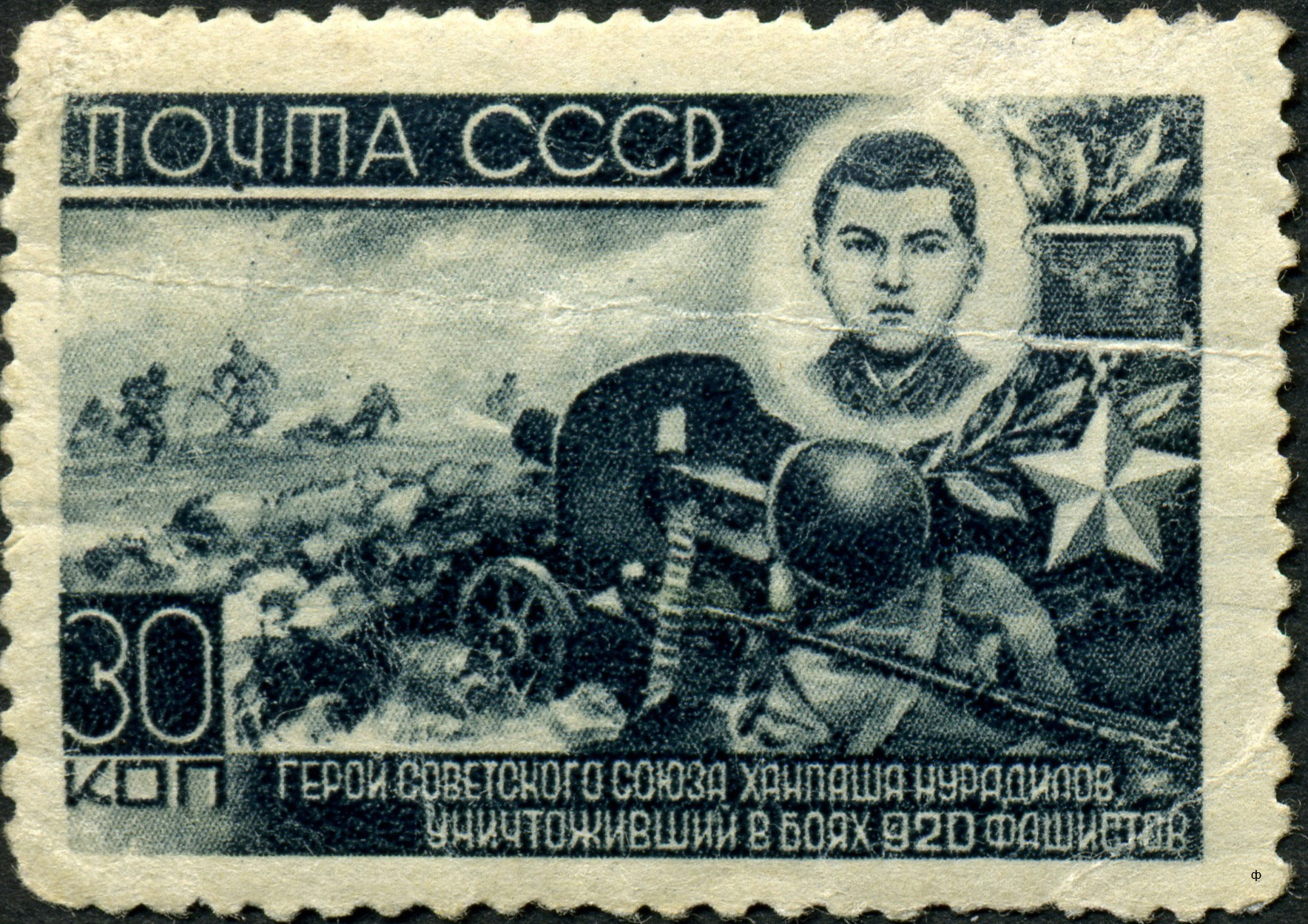
1944 Soviet postage stamp featuring Nuradilov

- Hero of the Soviet Union
- Order of Lenin
- Order of the Red Banner
- Order of the Red Star
