= Abukhadzhi Idrisov =

Soviet sniper and machine gunner (1918–1983)

- Абухаджи Идрисов
- Born: 17 May 1918; Berdikel village, Mountain Republic
- Died: 22 October 1983 (aged 65); Grozny, Russian SFSR, Soviet Union
- Military career
- Allegiance: Soviet Union
- Branch: Red Army
- Service years: 1939–1944
- Rank: Senior Sergeant
- Unit: 1232nd Rifle Regiment
- Awards: Hero of the Soviet Union

Abukhadzhi Idrisovich Idrisov (Chechen: Абухажи Идрисов, Russian: Абухаджи Идрисович Идрисов; 17 May 1918 – 22 October 1983) was a Soviet sniper and machine-gunner in the Red Army during the Second World War. He is considered as one of the deadliest snipers in history. Throughout the war he killed a total of 349 enemy combatants for which he was awarded the title Hero of the Soviet Union just shortly before he was deported to the Kazakh SSR solely on the grounds of his Chechen ethnicity. He was only able to return to his native village in Chechnya in 1957 where he worked in agriculture after the Chechen nation was granted the right of return in the Khrushchev era.

== Early life ==
Idrisov was born on 17 May 1918 in Berdikel, Mountain Republic (present-day Komsomolskoye, Chechenya) to a Chechen peasant family. He graduated from primary school and worked as a shepherd at the Sovetskaya Rossiya collective farm.

== Military career ==
Idrisov was drafted into the Red Army in October 1939 and assigned to the 125th Rifle Division in the Baltic states. He received training as a machine-gunner and saw combat from the first day of the German-Soviet War during the defense against Operation Barbarossa. With the rest of his regiment he retreated Northeast. In July 1941, his Division took up defensive positions on the Pskov-Velikiye Luki line between Lake Ilmen and Lake Seliger. There, they repulsed frequent German attacks against Leningrad; Idrisov was reported to have killed 22 German soldiers with his machine gun, resulting in him being sent for training to become a sniper.

After completing sniper training he was assigned in October 1942 to a sniper group positioned on a section of the North-Western Front where Axis forces were expected to advance. In a period of ten days of intense fighting Idrisov managed to kill approximately 100 enemy infantrymen as a sniper. By April 1943 he was reported to have killed over 300 German soldiers in total, while serving with the 1232nd Rifle Regiment of the 370th Rifle Division. After participating in the breakthrough of the blockade in Leningrad he fought in the offensives to retake the Pskov region and Baltic states. By March 1944 his tally as reported by his superiors totaled 349 kills and he had been nominated for the title Hero of the Soviet Union. Idrisov was demobilized in April after he was seriously wounded by a fragment of a mine that exploded next to him. He survived due to his fellow soldiers finding him unconscious and sending him to a hospital, and on 3 June 1944 he was awarded the title Hero of the Soviet Union. At a military exhibition his rifle and wartime photographs were put on display with the title "The glorious son of the Chechen people, Hero of the Soviet Union Abukhazhi Idrisov, destroyed more than three hundred German fascists."

== Postwar life and exile ==
Despite his awards and honors for serving loyally in the Red Army he was deported to Kazakhstan after spending four months in the Gorky hospital recovering from his wounds. While in exile he lived in Southwest Kazakhstan and worked on a farm as a sheep breeder. He returned to Chechnya immediately after being granted the right of return and became a member of the Communist Party in 1962. He lived in Chechnya for the remainder of his life and died in Grozny on 22 October 1983.

== Awards and honors ==
- Hero of the Soviet Union
- Order of Lenin
- Order of the Red Banner
- Order of the Red Star
