= Avtury =

Selo in Shalinsky District, Chechen Republic, Russia

Coordinates: 43°10′N 46°00′E

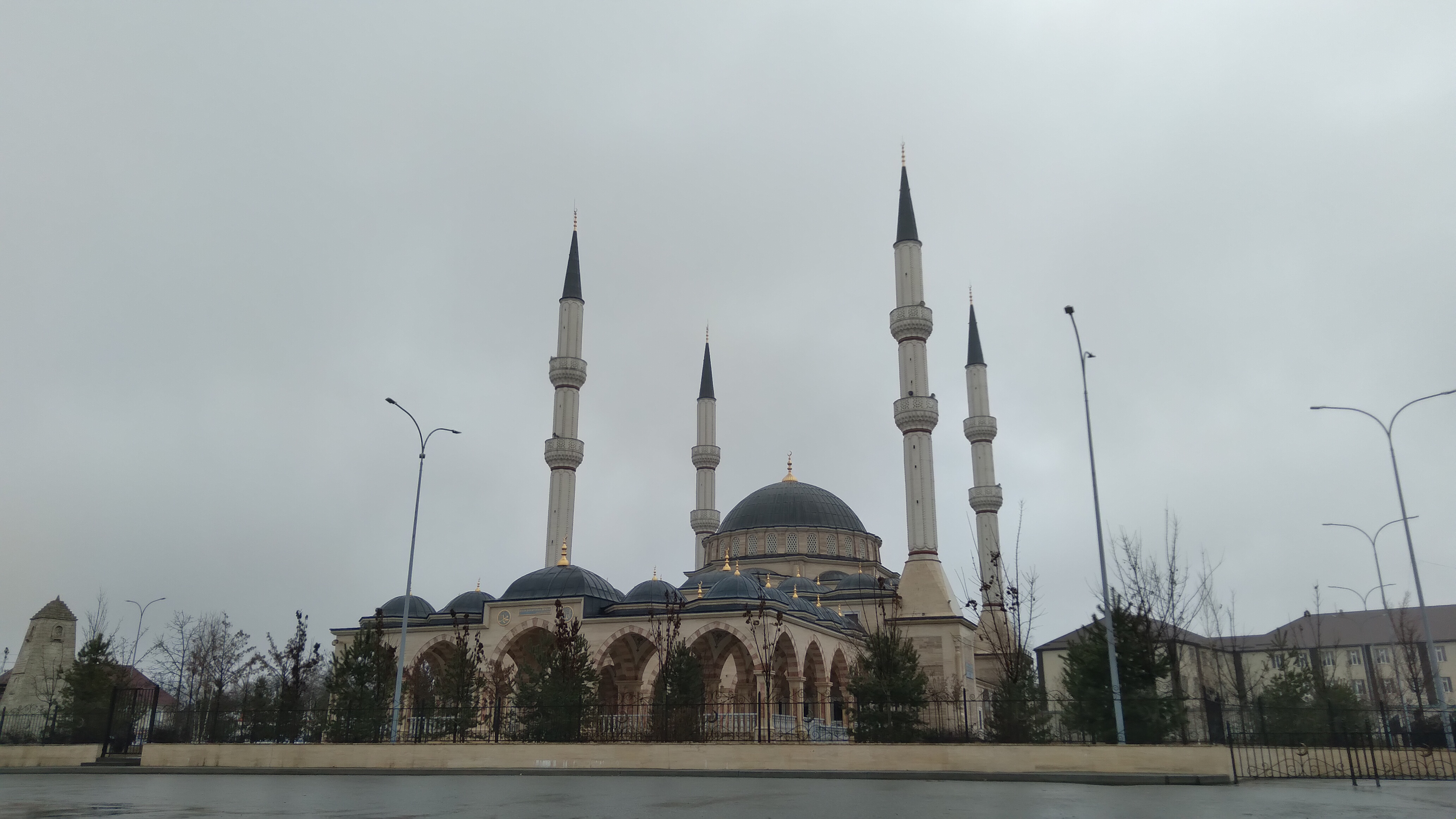
Avtury

Avtury (Russian: Автуры; Chechen: Эвтара, Evtara) is a rural locality (a selo) in Shalinsky District of the Chechen Republic, Russia, located on the Khulkhulau River, 6 kilometers (3.7 mi) east of Shali. Population: 14,988 (2010 census); 18,330 (2002 census).

It was supposedly founded in the 14th century, soon after the area was abandoned by the Mongols and Tatars. During the Caucasian War, Avtury was a combat area between Imam Shamil and the Russian troops.

The locality is noted for being the alleged birthplace of Abdulkhakim Ismailov. He was a Soviet soldier who was identified as one of the two men in the 1945 photograph Raising a Flag over the Reichstag.
