= Chechnya =

Republic of Russia in the North Caucasus

Chechen Republic Чеченская Республика (Russian)
- Republic

Other transcription(s)
  - Chechen: Нохчийн Республика
- Flag Coat of arms
- Anthem: State Anthem of the Chechen Republic
- Coordinates: 43°24′N 45°43′E
- Country: Russia
- Economic region: North Caucasus
- Established: January 10, 1993
- Capital: Grozny

Government
  - Body: Parliament
  - Head: Ramzan Kadyrov

Area
  - Total: 16,165 km^{2} (6,241 sq mi)

Population (2021 census)
  - Total: 1,510,824: 96.4% Chechens; 1.2% Russians; 0.8% Kumyks; 1.6% other
  - Rank: 31st
  - Density: 93.463/km^{2} (242.07/sq mi)
  - Urban: 38.2%
  - Rural: 61.8%

GDP (nominal, 2024)
  - Total: ₽397 billion (US$4.66 billion)
  - Per capita: ₽257,430 (US$3,020.73)
- Time zone: UTC+3 (MSK)
- ISO 3166 code: RU-CE
- License plates: 95
- OKTMO ID: 96000000
- Official languages: Russian; Chechen

Chechnya (Note: Chechen: Нохчийчоь, romanized: Noxçiyçö, pronounced [ˈnɔxtʃiːtʃᶣø]; Russian: Чечня, pronounced [tɕɪtɕˈnʲa]) (/ˈtʃɛtʃniə/ CHETCH-nee-ə), officially the Chechen Republic, (Note: Chechen: Нохчийн Республика, romanized: Noxçiyn Respublika; Russian: Чеченская Республика) is a republic of Russia. It is situated in the North Caucasus of Eastern Europe, between the Caspian Sea and Black Sea. The republic forms a part of the North Caucasian Federal District, and shares land borders with Georgia to its south; with the Russian republics of Dagestan, Ingushetia, and North Ossetia–Alania to its east, north, and west; and with Stavropol Krai to its northwest.

After the dissolution of the Soviet Union in 1991, the Checheno-Ingush ASSR split into two parts: the Republic of Ingushetia and the Chechen Republic. The latter proclaimed the Chechen Republic of Ichkeria, which declared independence, while the former sided with Russia. Following the First Chechen War of 1994–1996 with Russia, Chechnya gained de facto independence as the Chechen Republic of Ichkeria, although de jure it remained a part of Russia. Russian federal control was restored in the Second Chechen War of 1999–2009, with Chechen politics being dominated by the former Ichkerian mufti Akhmad Kadyrov, and later his son Ramzan Kadyrov.

The republic covers an area of 16,500 square kilometres (6,400 square miles), with a population of over 1.5 million residents as of 2021. Its population largely consists of the indigenous Chechen ethnic group, who are part of the Nakh peoples and adhere primarily to the Islamic faith. Grozny is the capital and largest city.

== History ==
=== Origin of Chechnya's population ===
According to Leonti Mroveli, the 11th-century Georgian chronicler, the word "Caucasus" is derived from the Nakh ancestor Kavkas. According to George Anchabadze of Ilia State University:

The Vainakhs are the ancient natives of the Caucasus. It is noteworthy, that according to the genealogical table drawn up by Leonti Mroveli, the legendary forefather of the Vainakhs was "Kavkas", hence the name Kavkasians, one of the ethnicons met in the ancient Georgian written sources, signifying the ancestors of the Chechens and Ingush. As appears from the above, the Vainakhs, at least by name, are presented as the most "Caucasian" people of all the Caucasians (Caucasus – Kavkas – Kavkasians) in the Georgian historical tradition.

American linguist Johanna Nichols "has used language to connect the modern people of the Caucasus region to the ancient farmers of the Fertile Crescent" and her research suggests that "farmers of the region were proto-Nakh-Daghestanians". Nichols stated: "The Nakh–Dagestanian languages are the closest thing we have to a direct continuation of the cultural and linguistic community that gave rise to Western civilisation."

=== Prehistory ===
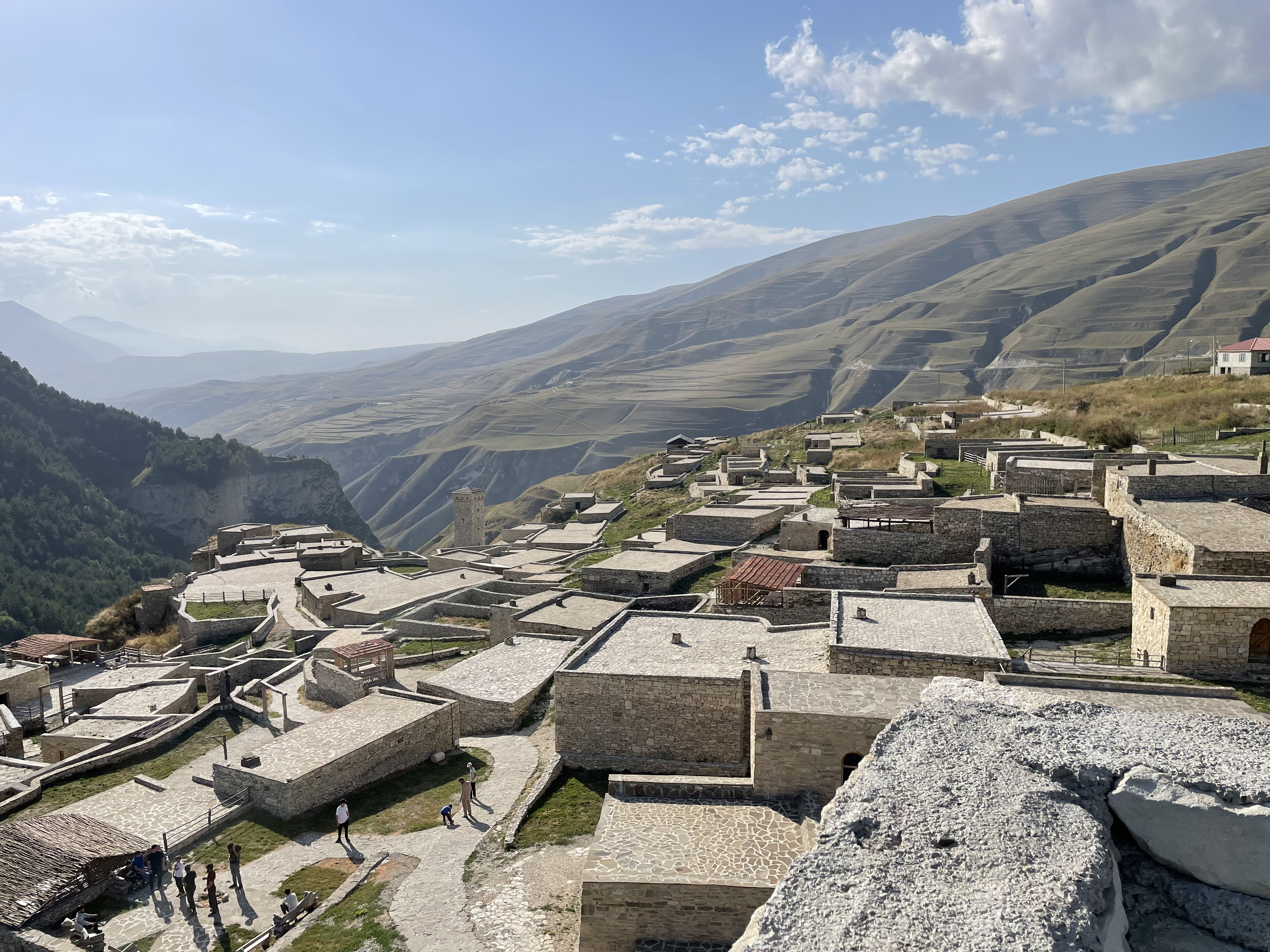
Khoi (Chechnya).

Traces of human settlement dating back to 40,000 BC were found near Lake Kezenoyam. Cave paintings, artifacts, and other archaeological evidence indicate continuous habitation for some 8,000 years. People living in these settlements used tools, fire, and clothing made of animal skins.

The Caucasian Epipaleolithic and early Caucasian Neolithic era saw the introduction of agriculture, irrigation, and the domestication of animals in the region. Settlements near Ali-Yurt and Magas, discovered in modern times, revealed tools made out of stone: stone axes, polished stones, stone knives, stones with holes drilled in them, clay dishes, etc. Settlements made out of clay bricks were discovered in the plains. In the mountains there were settlements made from stone and surrounded by walls; some of them dated back to 8000 BC. This period also saw the appearance of the wheel (3000 BC), horseback riding, metal works (copper, gold, silver, iron), dishes, armor, daggers, knives and arrow tips in the region. The artifacts were found near Nasare-Cort, Muzhichi, Ja-E-Bortz (alternatively known as Surkha-khi), Abbey-Gove (also known as Nazran or Nasare).

=== Pre-imperial era ===
In the 14th and 15th centuries, there was frequent warfare between the Chechens, Tamerlane and Tokhtamysh, culminating in the Battle of the Terek River. The Chechen tribes built fortresses, castles, and defensive walls, protecting the mountains from the invaders (see Chechen tower architecture). Part of the lowland tribes were occupied by Mongols. However, during the mid-14th century a strong Chechen Princedom called Simsim emerged under Khour II, a Chechen king that led the Chechen politics and wars. He was in charge of an army of Chechens against the rogue warlord Mamai and defeated him in the Battle of Tatar-tup in 1362. The kingdom of Simsim was almost destroyed during the Timurid invasion of the Caucasus, when Khour II allied himself with the Golden Horde Khan Tokhtamysh in the Battle of the Terek River. Timur sought to punish the highlanders for their allegiance to Tokhtamysh and as a consequence invaded Simsim in 1395.

The 16th century saw the first Russian involvement in the Caucasus. In 1558, Temryuk of Kabarda sent his emissaries to Moscow requesting help from Ivan the Terrible against the Vainakh tribes. Ivan the Terrible married Temryuk's daughter Maria Temryukovna. An alliance was formed to gain the ground in the central Caucasus for the expanding Tsardom of Russia against Vainakh defenders.

In 1667 Mehk-Da Aldaman Gheza defended the borders of Chechnya from invasions of Kabardinians and Avars during the Battle of Khachara. The Chechens converted over the next few centuries to Sunni Islam, as Islam was associated with resistance to Russian encroachment.

=== Imperial rule ===
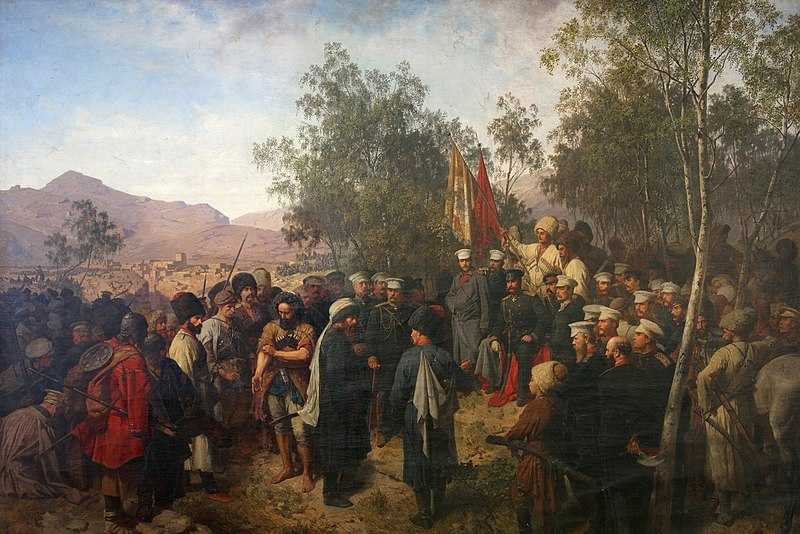
Captured Imam Shamil before the commander-in-chief Prince Bariatinsky on 25 August 1859; painting by Theodor Horschelt.

Russian Emperor Peter the Great first sought to increase Russia's political influence in the Caucasus and the Caspian Sea at the expense of Safavid Persia when he launched the Russo-Persian War of 1722–1723. Russian forces succeeded in taking much of the Caucasian territories from Persia for several years.

As the Imperial Russian Army took control of the Caspian corridor and moved into Persian-ruled Dagestan, Peter's forces ran into mountain tribes. Peter sent a cavalry force to subdue them, but the Chechens routed them. In 1732, after Russia had already ceded back most of the Caucasus to Persia, now led by Nader Shah, following the Treaty of Resht, Russian troops clashed again with Chechens in a village called Chechen-Aul along the Argun River. The Russians were defeated again and withdrew, but this battle is responsible for the apocryphal story about how the Nokhchiy came to be known as "Chechens" – the people ostensibly named for the place the battle had taken place. However, the name "Chechen" had already been used as early as 1692.

Under intermittent Persian rule since 1555, in 1783, the eastern Georgians of Kartl-Kakheti, led by Erekle II, and the Russians signed the Treaty of Georgievsk. According to this treaty, Kartl-Kakheti received protection from Russia, and Georgia abjured any dependence on Iran. To increase its influence in the Caucasus and secure communication with Kartli and other Christian-inhabited regions of Transcaucasia, which it considered useful in its wars against Persia and the Ottoman Empire, the Russian Empire began conquering the Northern Caucasus mountains. The Russian Empire used Christianity to justify its conquests. This allowed Islam to spread widely among the Chechens, as it positioned itself as the religion of liberation from the Tsardom of Russia, which viewed Nakh tribes as "bandits". The rebellion was led by Mansur Ushurma, a Chechen sheikh belonging to the Naqshbandi Sufi order—with wavering military support from other North Caucasian tribes. Mansur hoped to establish an Islamic state based in the Transcaucasus under Sharia law. He was unable to fully achieve this because, in the course of the war, he was betrayed by the Ottoman Turks, handed over to the Russians, and executed in 1794.

After Persia was forced to cede the current territories of Dagestan, most of Azerbaijan, and Georgia to Russia following the Russo-Persian War of 1804–1813 and its resultant Treaty of Gulistan, Russia significantly widened its foothold in the Caucasus at Persia's expense. Another successful Caucasus war against Persia several years later, starting in 1826 and ending in 1828 with the Treaty of Turkmenchay, and a successful war against the Ottoman Empire in 1828–1829, enabled Russia to use a much larger portion of its army in subduing the natives of the North Caucasus.

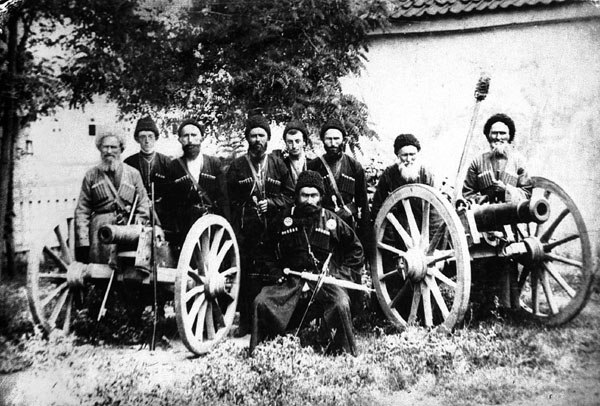
Chechen artillerymen

The resistance of the Nakh tribes never ended and was a fertile ground for a new Muslim-Avar commander, Imam Shamil, who fought against the Russians from 1834 to 1859 (see Murid War). In 1859, Shamil was captured by the Russians at aul Gunib. Shamil left Baysangur of Benoa, a Chechen with one arm, one eye, and one leg, in charge of command at Gunib. Baysangur broke through the siege and continued to fight Russia for another two years until he was captured and killed by Russians. The Russian Tsar hoped that by sparing the life of Shamil, the resistance in the North Caucasus would stop, but it did not. Russia began to use a colonization tactic by destroying Nakh settlements and building Cossack defense lines in the lowlands.

The Russian Tsarist regime used a different approach at the end of the 1860s. They offered Chechens and Ingush to leave the Caucasus for the Ottoman Empire (see Muhajir (Caucasus)). It is estimated that about 80% of Chechens and Ingush left the Caucasus during the deportation. It weakened the resistance, which went from open warfare to insurgent warfare. One of the notable Chechen resistance fighters at the end of the 19th century was a Chechen abrek Zelimkhan Gushmazukaev and his comrade-in-arms Ingush abrek Sulom-Beck Sagopshinski. Together they built up small units which constantly harassed Russian military convoys, government mints, and the postal service, mainly in Ingushetia and Chechnya. Ingush aul Kek was completely burned when the Ingush refused to hand over Zelimkhan. Zelimkhan was killed at the beginning of the twentieth century. The war between Nakh tribes and Russia resurfaced during the times of the Russian Revolution, which saw the Nakh struggle against Anton Denikin and later against the Soviet Union.

On 21 December 1917, Ingushetia, Chechnya, and Dagestan declared independence from Russia and formed a single state: the United Mountain Dwellers of the North Caucasus, which was recognized by major world powers of the time. The capital of the new state was moved to Temir-Khan-Shura (today in Dagestan). Tapa Tchermoeff, a prominent Chechen statesman, was elected the first prime minister of the state. The second prime minister elected was Vassan-Girey Dzhabagiev, an Ingush statesman, who also was the author of the constitution of the republic in 1917, and in 1920 he was re-elected for the third term. In 1921 the Russians attacked and occupied the country and forcibly absorbed it into the Soviet state. The Caucasian war for independence restarted, and the government went into exile.

=== Soviet rule ===
Under the Soviet Union, Chechnya and Ingushetia were combined to form the Checheno-Ingush Autonomous Soviet Socialist Republic. In the 1930s, Chechnya was flooded with many Ukrainians fleeing a famine. As a result, many of the Ukrainians settled in Chechen-Ingush ASSR permanently and survived the famine. Although over 50,000 Chechens and over 12,000 Ingush were fighting against Nazi Germany on the front line (including Heroes of the USSR: Abukhadzhi Idrisov, Khanpasha Nuradilov, Movlid Visaitov), and although Nazi German troops advanced as far as the Ossetian ASSR city of Ordzhonikidze and the Chechen-Ingush ASSR city of Malgobek after capturing half of the Caucasus in less than a month, Chechens and Ingush were falsely accused as Nazi supporters and entire nations were deported during Operation Lentil to the Kazakh SSR (later Kazakhstan) in 1944 near the end of World War II where over 60% of Chechen and Ingush populations perished. American historian Norman Naimark writes:

Troops assembled villagers and townspeople, loaded them onto trucks – many deportees remembered that they were Studebakers, fresh from Lend-Lease deliveries over the Iranian border – and delivered them at previously designated railheads. ... Those who could not be moved were shot. ... [A] few fighters aside, the entire Chechen and Ingush nations, 496,460 people, were deported from their homeland.

The deportation was justified by the materials prepared by NKVD officer Bogdan Kobulov accusing Chechens and Ingush in a mass conspiracy preparing rebellion and providing assistance to the German forces. Many of the materials were later proven to be fabricated. Even distinguished Red Army officers who fought bravely against Germans (e.g. the commander of 255th Separate Chechen-Ingush regiment Movlid Visaitov, the first to contact American forces at Elbe river) were deported. There is a theory that the real reason why Chechens and Ingush were deported was the desire of Russia to attack Turkey, an anti-communist country, as Chechens and Ingush could impede such plans. In 2004, the European Parliament recognized the deportation of Chechens and Ingush as an act of genocide.

The territory of the Chechen-Ingush Autonomous Soviet Socialist Republic was divided between Stavropol Krai (where Grozny Okrug was formed), the Dagestan ASSR, the North Ossetian ASSR, and the Georgian SSR.

The Chechens and Ingush were allowed to return to their land after 1956 during de-Stalinization under Nikita Khrushchev when the Chechen-Ingush ASSR was restored but with both the boundaries and ethnic composition of the territory significantly changed. There were many (predominantly Russian) migrants from other parts of the Soviet Union, who often settled in the abandoned family homes of Chechens and Ingushes. The republic lost its Prigorodny District which transferred to North Ossetian ASSR but gained predominantly Russian Naursky District and Shelkovskoy District that is considered the homeland for Terek Cossacks.

The Russification policies towards Chechens continued after 1956, with Russian language proficiency required in many aspects of life to provide Chechens better opportunities for advancement in the Soviet system. On 26 November 1990, the Supreme Council of Chechen-Ingush ASSR adopted the "Declaration of State Sovereignty of the Chechen-Ingush Republic". This declaration was part of the reorganisation of the Soviet Union. This new treaty was to be signed 22 August 1991, which would have transformed 15 republic states into more than 80. The 19–21 August 1991 Soviet coup d'état attempt led to the abandonment of this reorganisation.

With the impending dissolution of the Soviet Union in 1991, an independence movement, the Chechen National Congress, was formed, led by ex-Soviet Air Force general and new Chechen President Dzhokhar Dudayev. It campaigned for the recognition of Chechnya as a separate nation. This movement was opposed by Boris Yeltsin's Russian Federation, which argued that Chechnya had not been an independent entity within the Soviet Union—as the Baltic, Central Asian, and other Caucasian states such as Georgia had—but was part of the Russian Soviet Federative Socialist Republic and hence did not have a right under the Soviet constitution to secede. It also argued that other republics of Russia, such as Tatarstan, would consider seceding from the Russian Federation if Chechnya were granted that right. Finally, it argued that Chechnya was a major hub in the oil infrastructure of Russia and hence its secession would hurt the country's economy and energy access.

During the Chechen Revolution, the Soviet Chechen leader Doku Zavgayev was overthrown and Dzhokhar Dudayev seized power. On 1 November 1991, Dudaev's Chechnya issued a unilateral declaration of independence. In the ensuing decade, the territory was locked in an ongoing struggle between various factions, usually fighting unconventionally.

=== Chechen Wars and brief independence ===
The First Chechen War, during which Russian forces attempted to regain control over Chechnya, took place from 1994 to 1996. Despite overwhelming numerical superiority in troops, weaponry, and air support, the Russian forces were unable to establish effective permanent control over the mountainous area due to numerous successful full-scale battles and insurgency raids. The Budyonnovsk hospital hostage crisis in 1995 shocked the Russian public. In April 1996, the first democratically elected president of Chechnya, Dzhokhar Dudayev, was killed by Russian forces using a booby trap bomb and a missile fired from a warplane after he was located by triangulating the position of a satellite phone he was using.

The widespread demoralization of the Russian Army in the area and a successful offensive to retake Grozny by Chechen rebel forces led by Aslan Maskhadov prompted Russian president Boris Yeltsin to declare a ceasefire in 1996, and sign a peace treaty a year later that saw a withdrawal of Russian troops.

After the war, parliamentary and presidential elections took place in January 1997 in Chechnya and brought to power new president Aslan Maskhadov, chief of staff and prime minister in the Chechen coalition government, for a five-year term. Maskhadov sought to maintain Chechen sovereignty while pressing the Russian government to help rebuild the republic, whose formal economy and infrastructure were virtually destroyed. Russia continued to send money for the rehabilitation of the republic; it also provided pensions and funds for schools and hospitals. Nearly half a million people (40% of Chechnya's prewar population) had been internally displaced and lived in refugee camps or overcrowded villages. There was an economic downturn. Two Russian brigades were permanently stationed in Chechnya.

In light of the devastated economic structure, kidnapping emerged as the principal source of income countrywide, procuring over US$200 million during the three-year independence of the chaotic fledgling state, although victims were rarely killed. In 1998, 176 people were kidnapped, 90 of whom were released, according to official accounts. President Maskhadov started a major campaign against hostage-takers, and on 25 October 1998, Shadid Bargishev, Chechnya's top anti-kidnapping official, was killed in a remote-controlled car bombing. Bargishev's colleagues then insisted they would not be intimidated by the attack and would go ahead with their offensive. Political violence and religious extremism, blamed on Salafism and Wahhabism, was rife. In 1998, Grozny authorities declared a state of emergency. Tensions led to open clashes between the Chechen National Guard and Islamist militants, such as the July 1998 confrontation in Gudermes.

The War of Dagestan began on 7 August 1999, during which the Islamic International Peacekeeping Brigade (IIPB) began an unsuccessful incursion into the neighboring Russian republic of Dagestan in favor of the Shura of Dagestan, which sought independence from Russia. In September, a series of apartment bombings that killed around 300 people in several Russian cities, including Moscow, were blamed on Chechen separatists. Some journalists contested the official explanation, instead blaming the Russian secret services for blowing up the buildings to initiate a new military campaign against Chechnya. In response to the bombings, a prolonged air campaign of retaliatory strikes against the Ichkerian regime and a ground offensive that began in October 1999 marked the beginning of the Second Chechen War. Much better organized and planned than the First Chechen War, the Russian armed forces took control of most regions. The Russian forces used brutal force, killing 60 Chechen civilians during a mop-up operation in Aldy, Chechnya on 5 February 2000. After the re-capture of Grozny in February 2000, the Ichkerian regime fell apart.

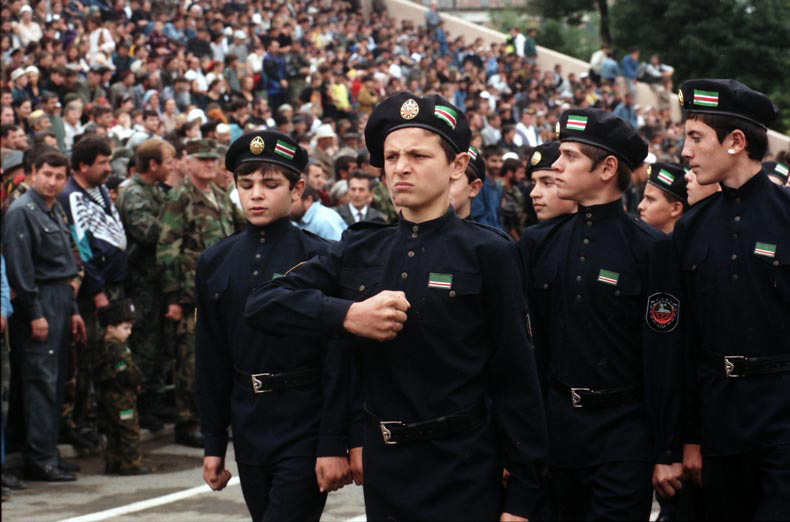
Cadets of the Ichkeria Chechen national guard, 1999.

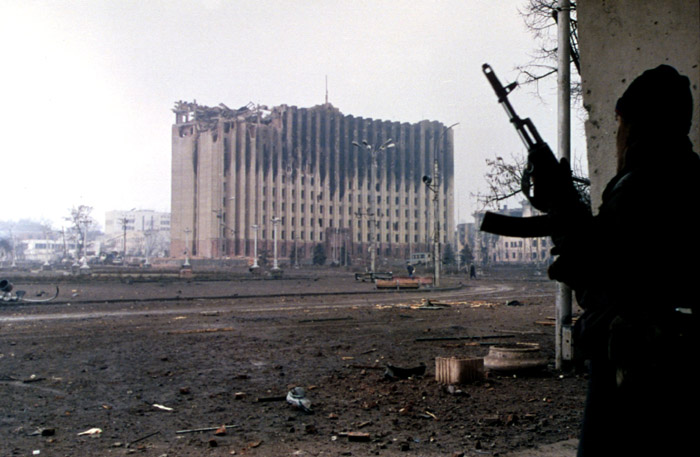
A Chechen fighter stands near the government palace building during a short lull in fighting in Grozny, Chechnya.

=== Post-war reconstruction and insurgency ===
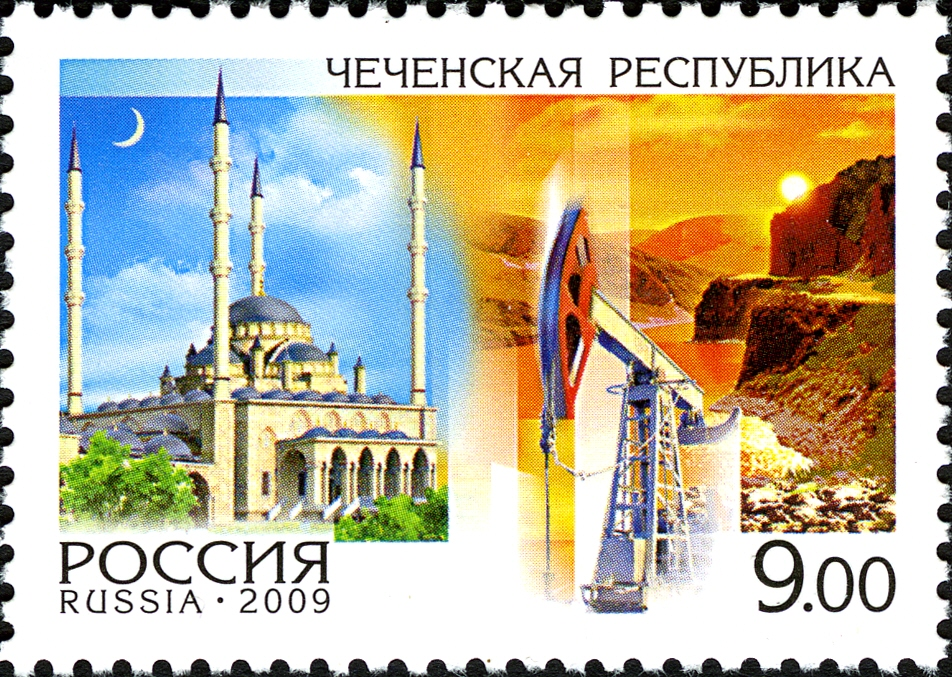
Postage stamp issued in 2009 by the Russian Post dedicated to Chechnya

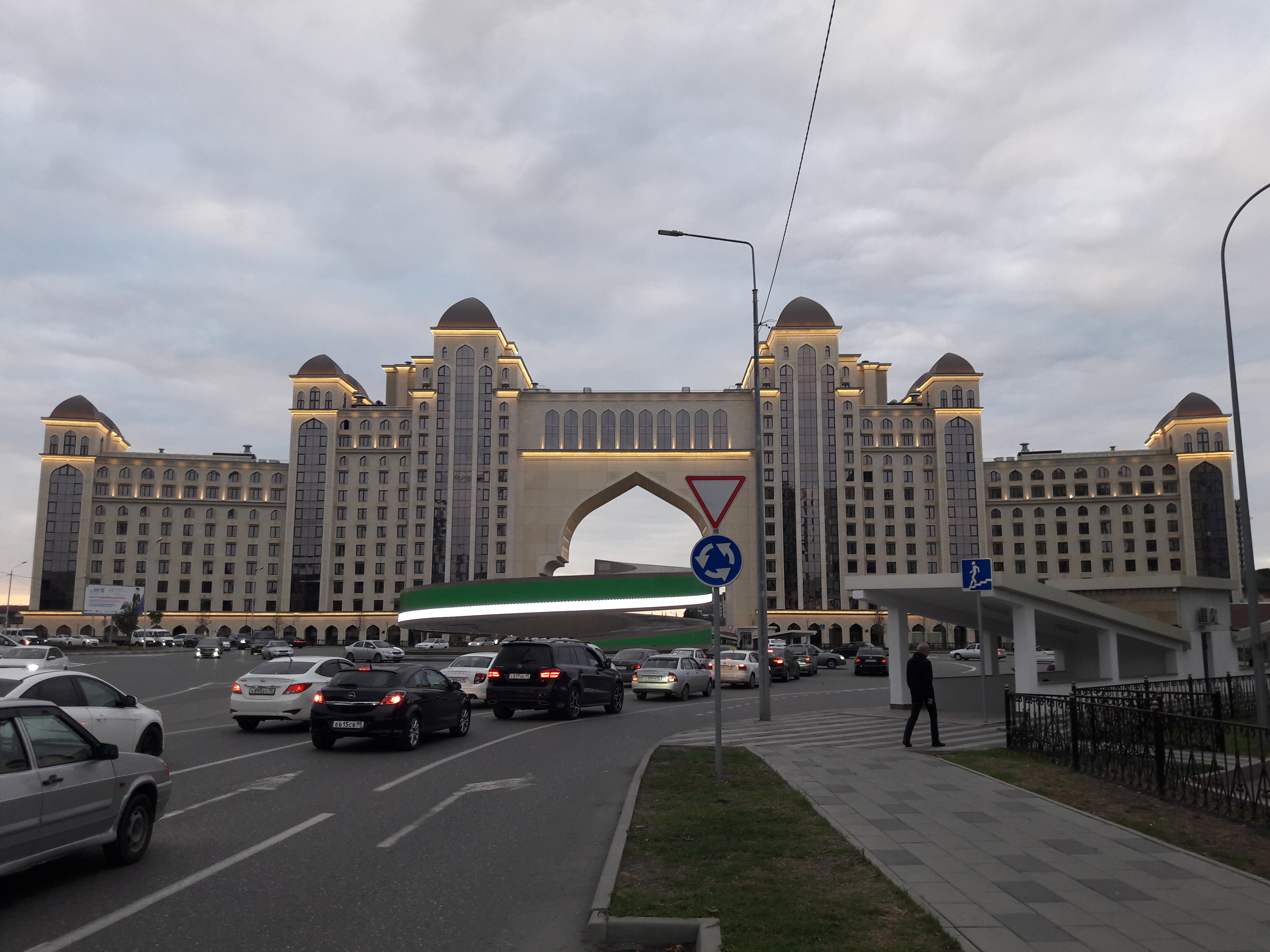
Minutka Square, Grozny

Chechen separatists continued to fight Russian troops and conduct terror attacks after the occupation of Grozny. In October 2002, 40–50 Chechen rebels seized a Moscow theater and took about 900 civilians hostage. The crisis ended with 117 hostages and up to 50 rebels dead, mostly due to an unknown aerosol pumped into the building by Russian special forces to incapacitate the people inside.

In response to these attacks, Russia tightened its grip on Chechnya and expanded its anti-terrorist operations throughout the region. Russia installed a pro-Russian Chechen regime. In 2003, a referendum was held on a constitution that reintegrated Chechnya within Russia but provided limited autonomy. According to the Chechen government, the referendum passed with 95.5% of the votes and almost 80% turnout. The Economist was sceptical of the results, arguing that "few outside the Kremlin regard the referendum as fair".

In September 2004, separatist rebels occupied a school in the town of Beslan, North Ossetia, demanding recognition of the independence of Chechnya and a Russian withdrawal. 1,100 people (including 777 children) were taken hostage. The attack lasted three days, resulting in the deaths of over 331 people, including 186 children. After the 2004 school siege, Russian president Vladimir Putin announced sweeping security and political reforms, sealing borders in the Caucasus region and revealing plans to give the central government more power. He also vowed to take tougher action against domestic terrorism, including preemptive strikes against Chechen separatists. In 2005 and 2006, separatist leaders Aslan Maskhadov and Shamil Basayev were killed.

Since 2007, Chechnya has been governed by Ramzan Kadyrov. Kadyrov's rule has been characterized by high-level corruption, a poor human rights record, widespread use of torture, and a growing cult of personality. Allegations of anti-gay purges in Chechnya were initially reported on 1 April 2017.

In April 2009, Russia ended its counter-terrorism operations and pulled out the bulk of its army. The insurgency in the North Caucasus continued even after this date. The Caucasus Emirate had fully adopted the tenets of a Salafi-jihadist group through its strict adherence to the Sunni Hanbali obedience to the literal interpretation of the Quran and the Sunnah.

The Chechen government has been outspoken in its support for the 2022 Russian invasion of Ukraine, where a Chechen military force, the Kadyrovtsy, which is under Kadyrov's personal command, has played a leading role, notably in the Siege of Mariupol. Meanwhile, a substantial number of Chechen separatists have allied themselves to the Ukrainian cause and are fighting a mutual Russian enemy in the Donbas.

In March 2025, Chechnya blocked the messaging app Telegram due to concerns that it could be used by "enemies".

== Geography ==
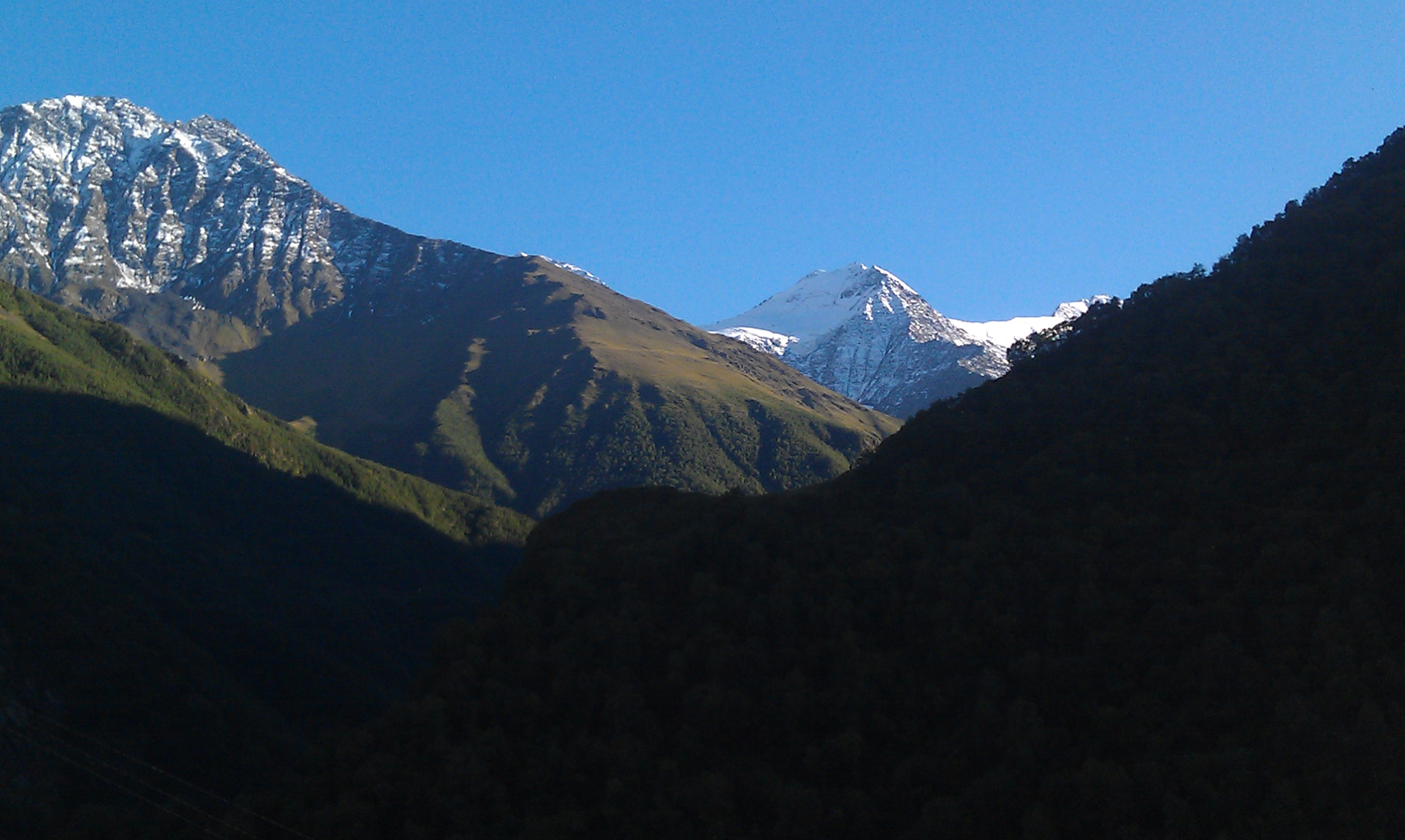
The mountains in the area Sharoy

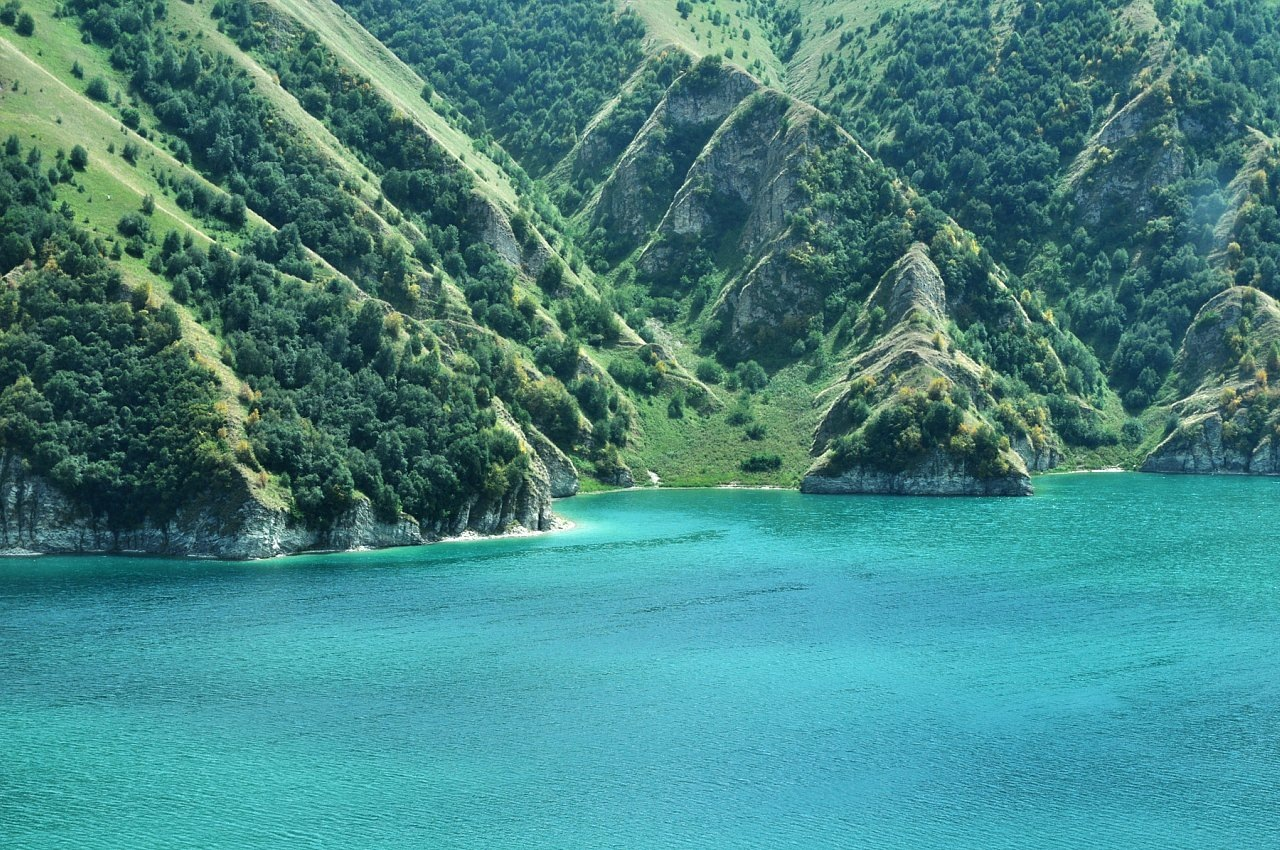
Lake Kezenoyam

Situated in the eastern part of the North Caucasus in Eastern Europe, Chechnya is surrounded on nearly all sides by Russian Federal territory. In the west, it borders North Ossetia and Ingushetia, in the north, Stavropol Krai, in the east, Dagestan, and to the south, Georgia. Its capital is Grozny.

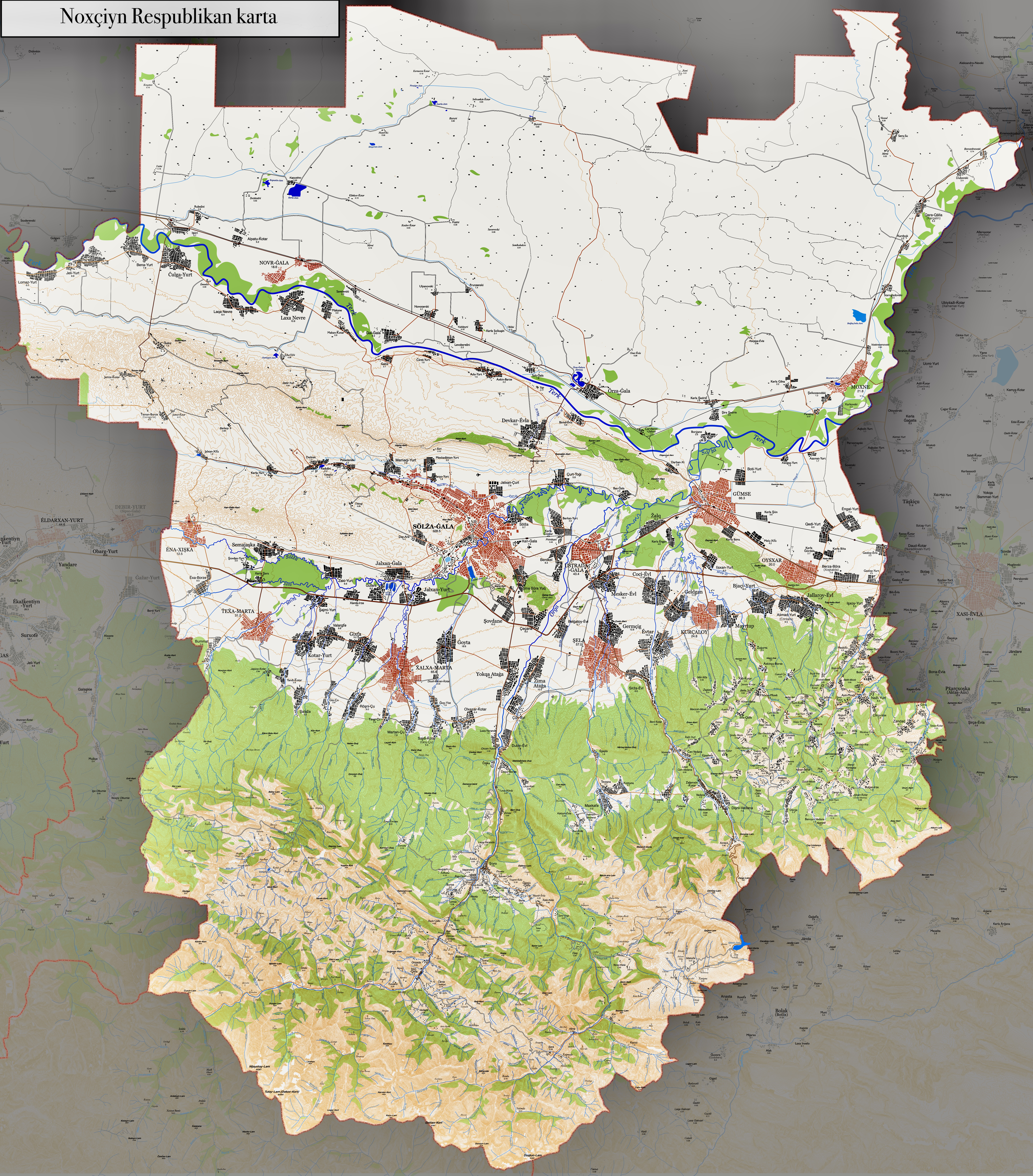
Map of the Chechen Republic (in Chechen)

Chechnya is well known for being mountainous, but it is in fact split between the more flat areas north of the Terek, and the highlands south of the Terek.

- Area: 17,300 km^{2} (6,700 sq mi)
- Borders:
  - Internal:
    - Dagestan (NE)
    - Ingushetia (W)
    - North Ossetia–Alania (W)
    - Stavropol Krai (NW)
  - Foreign:
    - Georgia (Kakheti and Mtskheta-Mtianeti) (S)

Rivers:

- Terek
- Sunzha
- Argun

=== Climate ===
Despite a relatively small territory, Chechnya is characterized by a variety of climate conditions. The average temperature in Grozny is 11.2 °C (52.2 °F).

=== Cities and towns with over 20,000 people ===
Map of Chechen Republic (Chechnya)

- Grozny (capital)
- Shali
- Urus-Martan
- Gudermes
- Argun
- Kurchaloy
- Achkoy-Martan

== Administrative divisions ==
The Chechen Republic is divided into 15 districts and three cities of republican significance.

== Demographics ==
Chechen Republic population pyramid

Historical population
Year	Pop.	±%
1926	510,055	—
1959	710,424	+39.3%
1970	1,064,471	+49.8%
1979	1,153,450	+8.4%
1989	1,275,513	+10.6%
2002	1,103,686	−13.5%
2010	1,268,989	+15.0%
2021	1,510,824	+19.1%
2025	1,576,552	+4.4%
Sources: Census data, estimate

According to the 2021 Census, the population of the republic is 1,510,824, up from 1,268,989 in the 2010 Census. As of the 2021 Census, Chechens at 1,456,792 make up 96.4% of the republic's population. Other groups include Russians (18,225, or 1.2%), Kumyks (12,184, or 0.8%) and a host of other small groups, each accounting for less than 0.5% of the total population. The birth rate was 25.41 in 2004. (25.7 in Achkhoi Martan, 19.8 in Groznyy, 17.5 in Kurchaloi, 28.3 in Urus Martan and 11.1 in Vedeno).

The languages used in the Republic are Chechen and Russian. Chechen belongs to the Vaynakh or North-central Caucasian language family, which also includes Ingush and Batsb. Some scholars place it in a wider North Caucasian languages.

=== Life expectancy ===
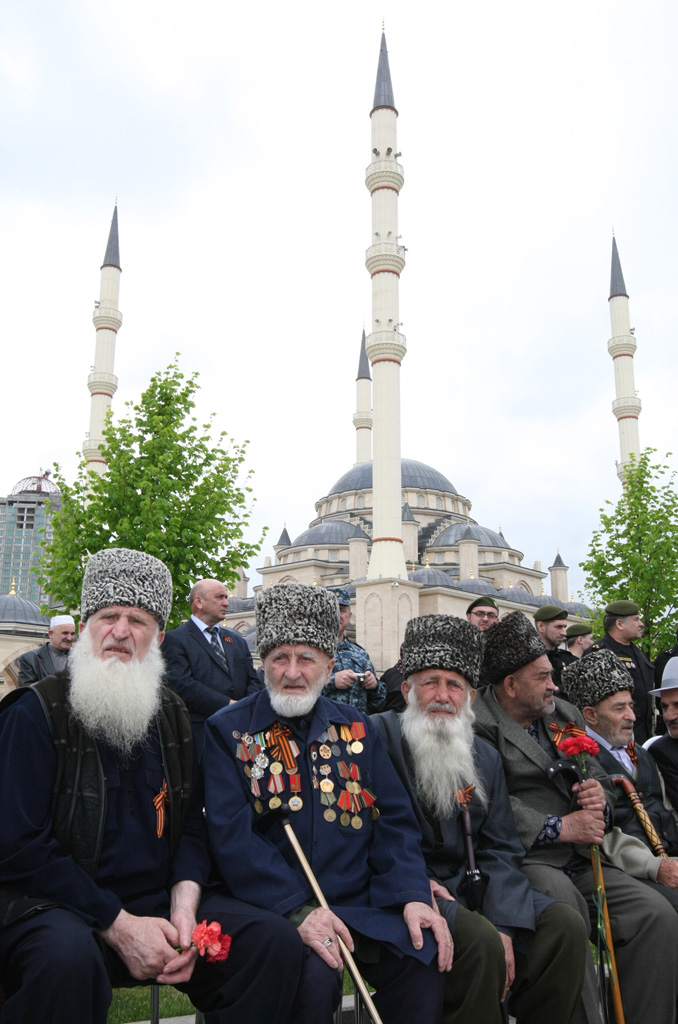
Chechen World War II veterans in Grozny, during celebrations on the 66th anniversary of victory in the Great Patriotic War.

Despite its difficult past, Chechnya has a high life expectancy, one of the highest in Russia. But the pattern of life expectancy is unusual, and according to numerous statistics, Chechnya stands out from the overall picture. In 2020, Chechnya had the deepest fall in life expectancy, but in 2021 it had the biggest rise. Chechnya has the highest excess of life expectancy in rural areas over cities.

	2019	2021
Average:	75.9 years	73.0 years
Male:	73.6 years	70.5 years
Female:	78.0 years	75.3 years

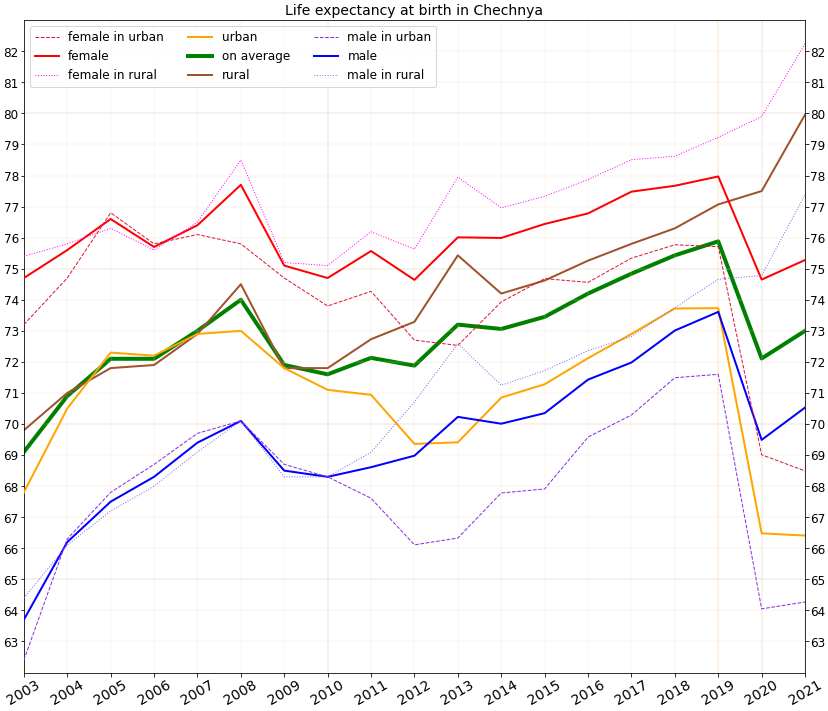
Life expectancy at birth in Chechnya

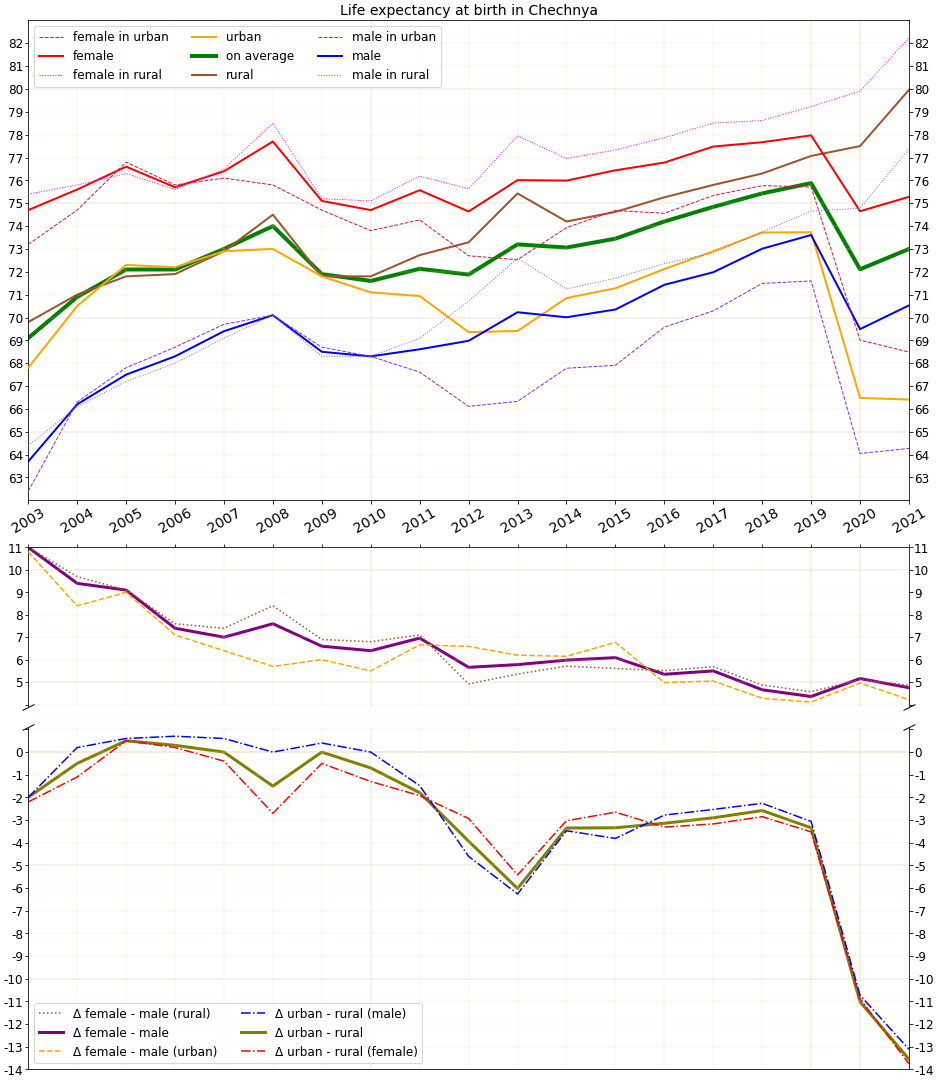
Life expectancy with calculated differences

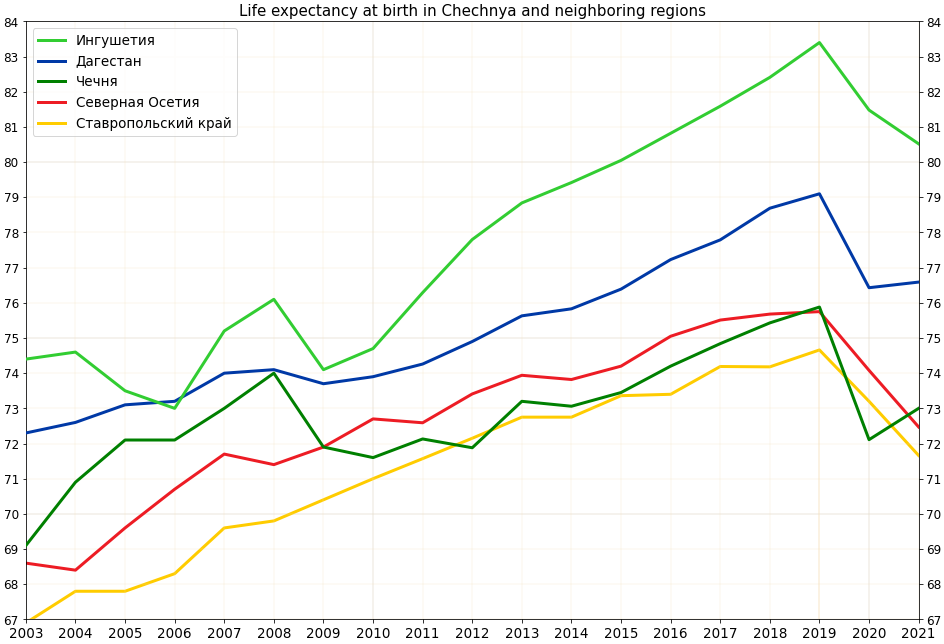
Life expectancy in Chechnya in comparison with neighboring regions of the country

Interactive chart of comparison of male and female life expectancy for 2021. Open the original svg-file in a separate window and hover over a bubble to highlight it.

Analogious interactive chart of comparison of urban and rural life expectancy.
Original interactive file.

=== Settlements ===
Largest cities or towns in Chechnya 2021 Russian Census
Rank	Name	Administrative division	Pop.
1	Grozny	City of republic significance of Grozny	328,533
2	Gudermes	Gudermessky District	64,376
3	Urus-Martan	Urus-Martanovsky District	63,449
4	Shali	Shalinsky District	55,054
5	Argun	Town of republic significance of Argun	41,622
6	Achkhoy-Martan	Achkhoy-Martanovsky District	30,739
7	Kurchaloy	Kurchaloyevsky District	23,425
8	Oyskhara	Gudermessky District	19,415
9	Goyty	Urus-Martanovsky District	19,198
10	Avtury	Shalinsky District, Chechnya	18,446

=== Vital statistics ===
Ethnolinguistic groups in the Caucasus Region

	Average population (x 1000)	Live births	Deaths	Natural change	Crude birth rate (per 1000)	Crude death rate (per 1000)	Natural change (per 1000)	Total fertility rate
2003	1,117	27,774	7,194	20 580	24.9	6.4	18.4	
2004	1,133	28,496	6,347	22,149	25.2	5.6	19.5	
2005	1,150	28,652	5,857	22,795	24.9	5.1	19.8	
2006	1,167	27,989	5,889	22,100	24.0	5.0	18.9	
2007	1,187	32,449	5,630	26,819	27.3	4.7	22.6	3.18
2008	1,210	35,897	5,447	30,450	29.7	4.5	25.2	3.44
2009	1,235	36,523	6,620	29,903	29.6	5.4	24.2	3.41
2010	1,260	37,753	7,042	30,711	30.0	5.6	24.4	3.45
2011	1,289	37,335	6,810	30,525	28.9	5.3	23.6	3.36
2012	1,314	34,385	7,192	27,193	26.2	5.5	20.7	3.08
2013	1,336	32,963	6,581	26,382	24.7	4.9	19.8	2.93
2014	1,358	32,949	6,864	26,085	24.3	5.1	19.2	2.91
2015	1,383	32,057	6,728	25,329	23.2	4.9	18.3	2.80
2016	1,404	29,893	6,630	23,263	21.3	4.7	16.6	2.62
2017	1,425	29,890	6,586	23,304	21.0	4.6	16.4	2.73
2018	1,444	29,883	6,430	23,453	20.6	4.4	16.2	2.60
2019	1,467	28,145	6,357	21,788	19.2	4.3	14.9	2.58
2020	1,488	30,111	9,188	20,923	20.2	6.2	14.0	2.57
2021	1,509	30,345	8,904	21,441	20.1	5.9	14.2	2.50
2022		30,821	7,370	23,451	20.2	4.8	15.4	2.74
2023		30,418	6,583	23,835	19.7	4.3	15.4	2.66
2024		31,293	7,228	24,065	20.0	4.6	15.4	2.67

=== Ethnic groups ===
(In the territory of modern Chechnya)

Ethnic group	1926 Census		1939 Census^{2}		1959 Census^{2}		1970 Census		1979 Census		1989 Census		2002 Census		2010 Census		2021 Census^{1}	
Ethnic group	Number	%	Number	%	Number	%	Number	%	Number	%	Number	%	Number	%	Number	%	Number	%
Chechens	293,298	67.3%	360,889	58.0%	238,331	39.7%	499,962	54.7%	602,223	60.1%	715,306	66.0%	1,031,647	93.5%	1,206,551	95.3%	1,456,792	96.4%
Russians	103,271	23.5%	213,354	34.3%	296,794	49.4%	327,701	35.8%	307,079	30.6%	269,130	24.8%	40,645	3.7%	24,382	1.9%	18,225	1.2%
Kumyks	2,217	0.5%	3,575	0.6%			6,865	0.8%	7,808	0.8%	9,591	0.9%	8,883	0.8%	12,221	1.0%	12,184	0.8%
Avars	830	0.2%	2,906	0.5%			4,196	0.5%	4,793	0.5%	6,035	0.6%	4,133	0.4%	4,864	0.4%	4,079	0.3%
Nogais	162	0.0%	1,302	0.2%			5,503	0.6%	6,079	0.6%	6,885	0.6%	3,572	0.3%	3,444	0.3%	2,819	0.2%
Ingush	798	0.2%	4,338	0.7%	3,639	0.6%	14,543	1.6%	20,855	2.1%	25,136	2.3%	2,914	0.3%	1,296	0.1%	1,100	0.1%
Ukrainians	11,474	2.6%	8,614	1.4%	11,947	2.0%	11,608	1.3%	11,334	1.1%	11,884	1.1%	829	0.1%	13,716	1.1%	15,625	1.0%
Armenians	5,978	1.4%	8,396	1.3%	12,136	2.0%	13,948	1.5%	14,438	1.4%	14,666	1.4%	424	0.0%	13,716	1.1%	15,625	1.0%
Others	18,840	4.13%	18,646	3.0%	37,550	6.3%	30,057	3.3%	27,621	2.8%	25,800	2.4%	10,639	1.0%	13,716	1.1%	15,625	1.0%
^{1} 2,515 people were registered from administrative databases, and could not declare an ethnicity. It is estimated that the proportion of ethnicities in this group is the same as that of the declared group.^{2} Almost all Chechen and Ingush people were deported to Central Asia in 1944. They were allowed to return to the Northern Caucasus in 1957 by Nikita Khrushchev. See Deportation of the Chechens and Ingush.

=== Religion ===
==== Islam ====
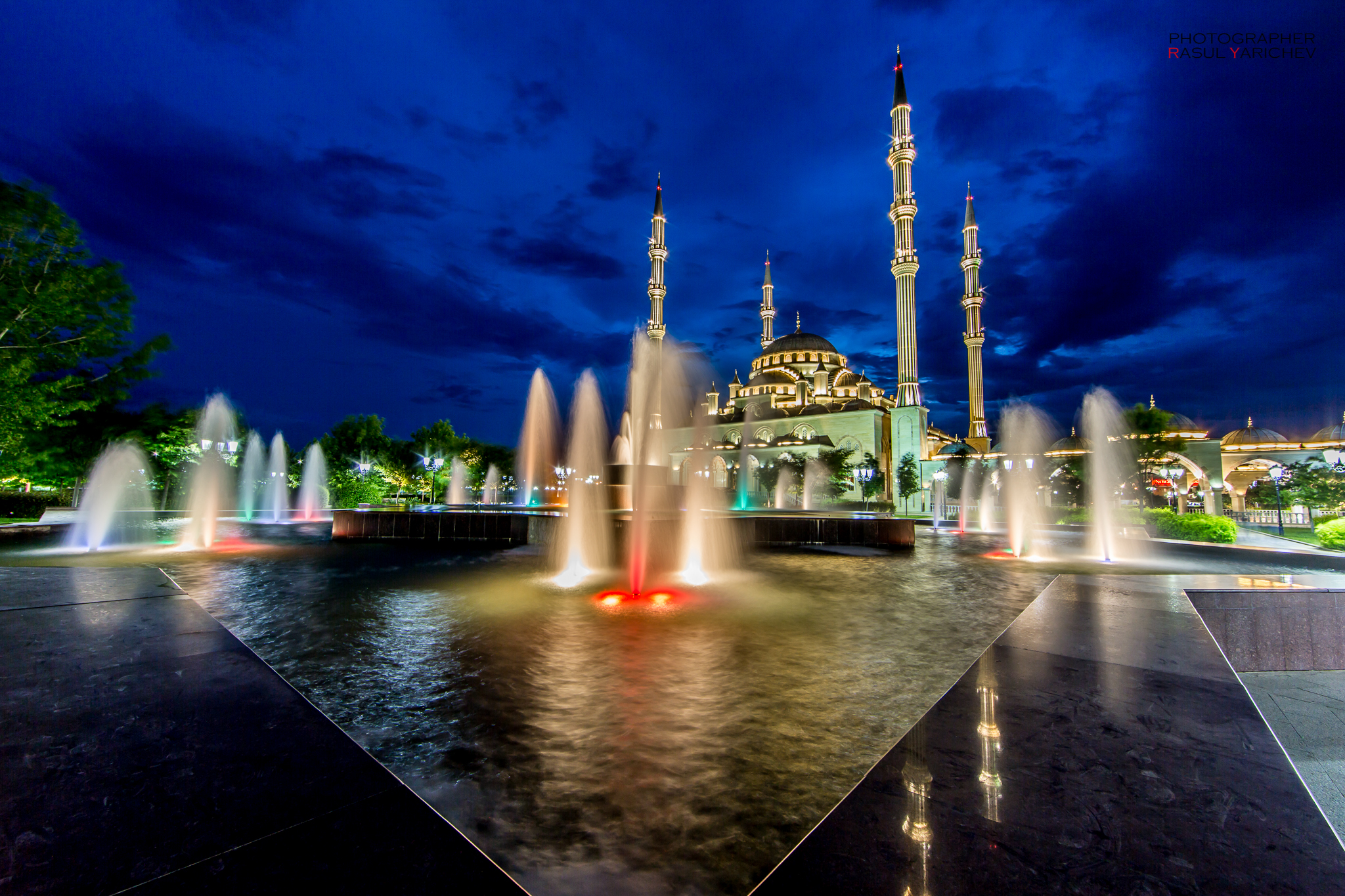
The "Heart of Chechnya" Mosque in Grozny, 2013

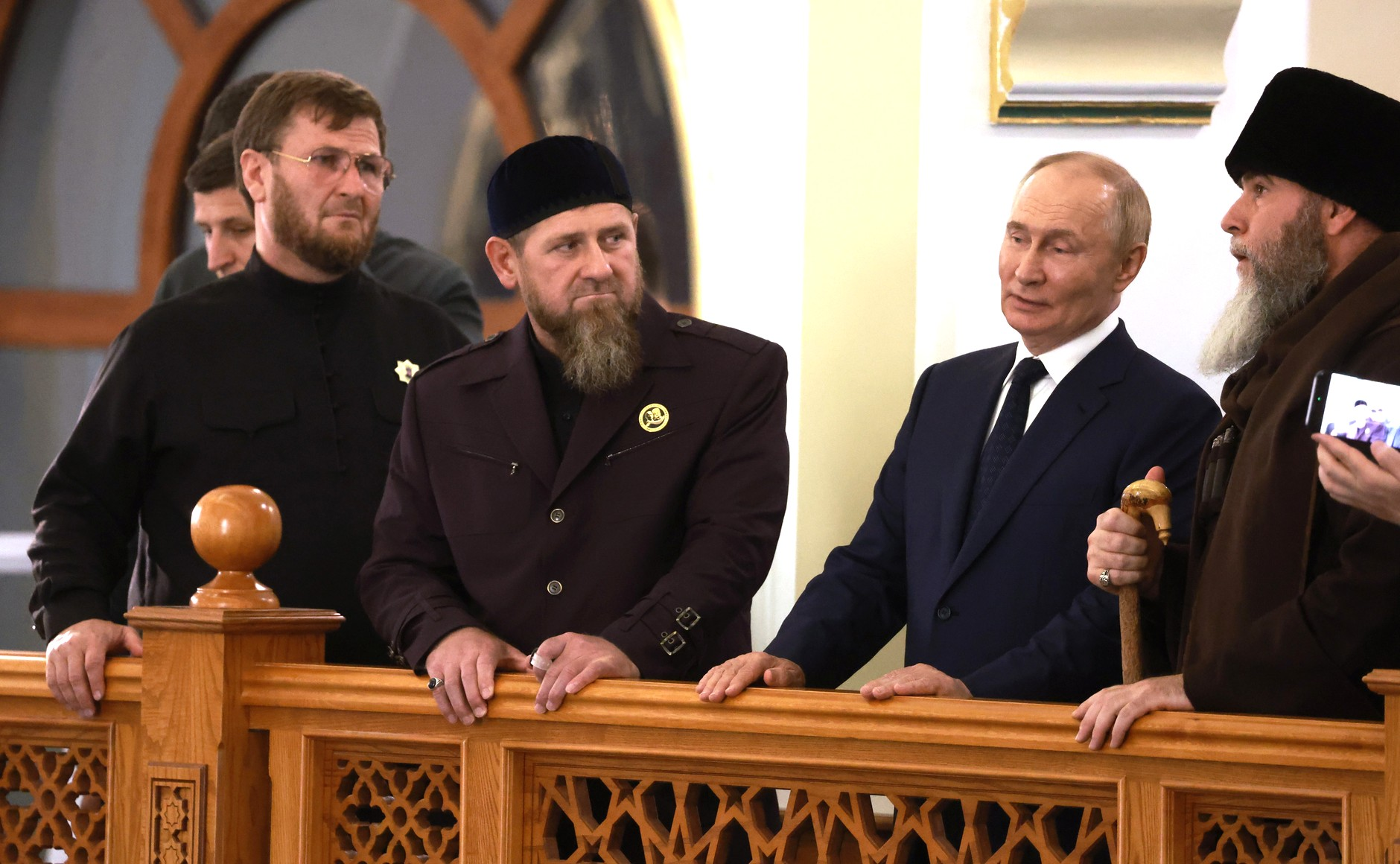
Chechnya's mufti Salah Mezhiev (right) with Ramzan Kadyrov (left) and Russian president Vladimir Putin (center) at the Prophet Isa Mosque in Grozny, 20 August 2024

Sunni Islam is the predominant religion in Chechnya, practiced by 95% of those polled in Grozny in 2010. Most of the population is Sunni and follows either the Shafi'i or the Hanafi schools of Islamic jurisprudence. The Shafi'i school of jurisprudence has a long tradition among the Chechens, and thus it remains the most practiced. Many Chechens are also Sufis, of either the Qadiri or Naqshbandi orders.

Following the collapse of the Soviet Union, there has been an Islamic revival in Chechnya, and in 2011 it was estimated that there were 465 mosques, including the Akhmad Kadyrov Mosque in Grozny accommodating 10,000 worshippers, as well 31 madrasas, including an Islamic university named Kunta-haji, the Kurchaloy Islamic Institute named Akhmad Kadyrov, and the Center of Islamic Medicine in Grozny, which is the largest such institution in Europe. A supreme Islamic administrative territorial organisation in Chechnya is the Spiritual Administration of the Muslims of the Chechen Republic or the Muftiate of the Chechen Republic.

==== Christianity ====
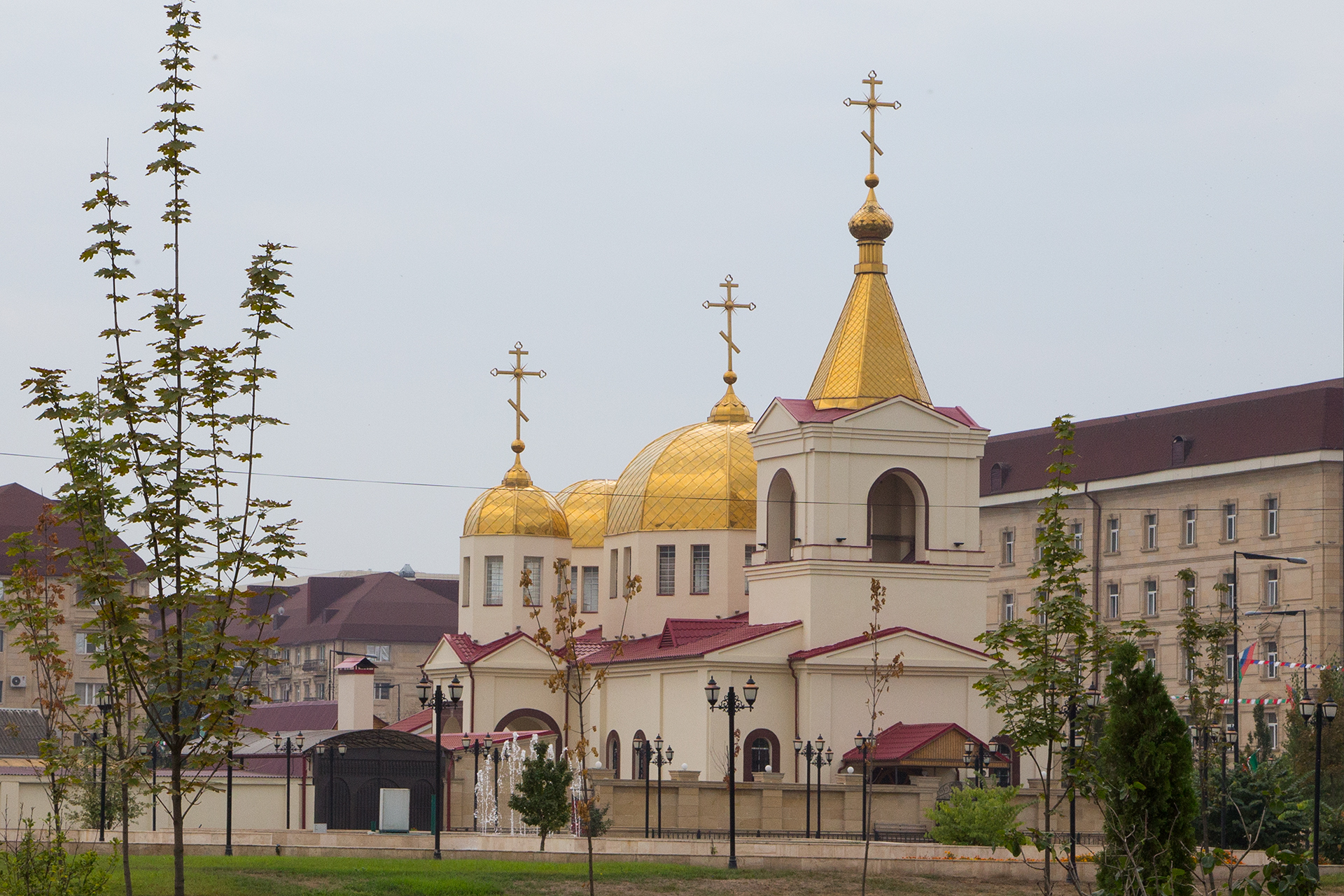
Church of Saint Michael the Archangel in Grozny

From the 11th to 13th centuries (i.e. before Mongol invasions of Durdzuketia), there was a mission of Georgian Orthodox missionaries to the Nakh peoples. They were not successful, though one or two highland teips did convert to Christianity (conversion was largely by teips). However, during the Mongol invasions of Durdzuketia, these Christianized teips gradually reverted to paganism, perhaps due to the loss of Transcaucasian contacts, as the Georgians fought the Mongols and briefly fell under their dominion.

The once-strong Russian minority in Chechnya, mostly Terek Cossacks and estimated as numbering approximately 25,000 in 2012, are predominantly Russian Orthodox, although currently only one church exists in Grozny. In August 2011, Archbishop Zosima of Vladikavkaz and Makhachkala performed the first mass baptism ceremony in the history of the Chechen Republic in the Terek River of Naursky District, in which 35 citizens of Naursky and Shelkovsky districts were converted to Russian Orthodoxy. As of 2020, there are eight Eastern Orthodox churches in Chechnya, the largest is the temple of the Archangel Michael in Grozny.

There has been a very small Baptist community in Chechnya since 1885. At its height there was around 800 members. In 1994 Baptists in Chechnya numbered 500 members, in 2000 there was 100 and 200 in 2002. Since then the community has declined with the Grozny prayer house having about 30 to 40 regular attendees in 2019 and about 20 by 2021, though the whole community may number around 170. Baptists in Chechnya are primarily non-Chechen, but there are a very small number of Chechen converts. As of 2013, there were two Baptist prayer houses in Chechnya, as well as one Seventh-Day Adventist prayer house.

== Politics ==
Since 1990, the Chechen Republic has had many legal, military, and armed conflicts involving the Russian-appointed leadership, movement for independence from Russia, the active phase of which had lasted for about a decade from 1991 to 2001 and which continues as low-level guerrilla attacks. Chechnya has enjoyed a period of relative stability under the Russian-appointed government headed by Ramzan Kadyrov, but he has been accused by observers of suppressing civilian freedoms and human rights violations including kidnappings and torture. Its regional constitution entered into effect on 2 April 2003, after an all-Chechen referendum was held on 23 March 2003 under the military control of Russia which recaptured Chechnya following the Second Chechen War. Some Chechens were controlled by regional teips, or clans, despite the existence of pro- and anti-Russian political structures.

In the 2024 Russian presidential election, which critics called rigged and fraudulent, Russian president Vladimir Putin won 98.99% of the vote in Chechnya.

Chechnya, under the current 2003 constitution, operates under a presidential system. Proposals for a parliamentary system were rejected as it was seen to be as "inconsistent with the overall [Russian] constitutional field." but was still supported by Beslan Gantamirov, former Mayor of Grozny.

=== Regional government ===
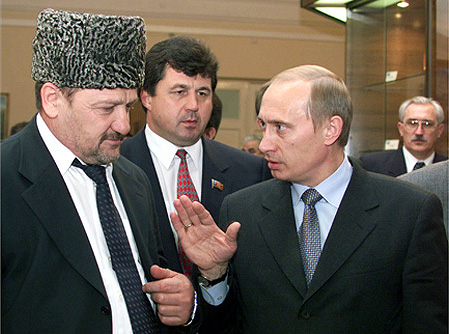
Akhmad Kadyrov, former separatist and head of the Chechen Republic, with Russian president Vladimir Putin, on 8 November 2000

The former separatist religious leader (mufti) Akhmad Kadyrov was elected president with 83% of the vote in an internationally monitored election on 5 October 2003. Incidents of ballot stuffing and voter intimidation by Russian soldiers and the exclusion of separatist parties from the polls were subsequently reported by Organization for Security and Co-operation in Europe (OSCE) monitors. On 9 May 2004, Kadyrov was assassinated in Grozny football stadium by a landmine explosion that was planted beneath a VIP stage and detonated during a parade, and Sergey Abramov was appointed acting prime minister after the incident. However, since 2005 Ramzan Kadyrov (son of Akhmad Kadyrov) has been the caretaker prime minister, and in 2007 was appointed as the new president. Many allege he is the wealthiest and most powerful man in the republic, with control over a large private militia (the Kadyrovites). The militia, which began as his father's security force, has been accused of killings and kidnappings by human rights organisations such as Human Rights Watch.

=== Separatist government ===
Ichkeria was a member of the Unrepresented Nations and Peoples Organization between 1991 and 2010. Former president of Georgia, Zviad Gamsakhurdia, deposed in a military coup of 1991 and a participant of the Georgian Civil War, recognized the independence of the Chechen Republic of Ichkeria in 1993. Diplomatic relations with Ichkeria were also established by the partially recognised Islamic Emirate of Afghanistan under the Taliban government on 16 January 2000. This recognition ceased with the fall of the Taliban in 2001. However, there were no friendly relations between the Taliban, and Ichkeria—Maskhadov rejected their recognition, stating that the Taliban were illegitimate. During the First (1994—1996) and the Second (1999—2000/2009) Chechen Wars, Ichkeria also received vocal support from the Baltic countries, a group of Ukrainian nationalists, and Poland; Estonia once voted to recognize, but the act never was followed through due to pressure applied by both Russia and the EU. After the beginning of the Russian invasion of Ukraine in 2022, Ichkeria got backing from Ukraine, the parliament of which recognized the "Chechen Republic of Ichkeria as territory temporarily occupied by the Russian Federation."

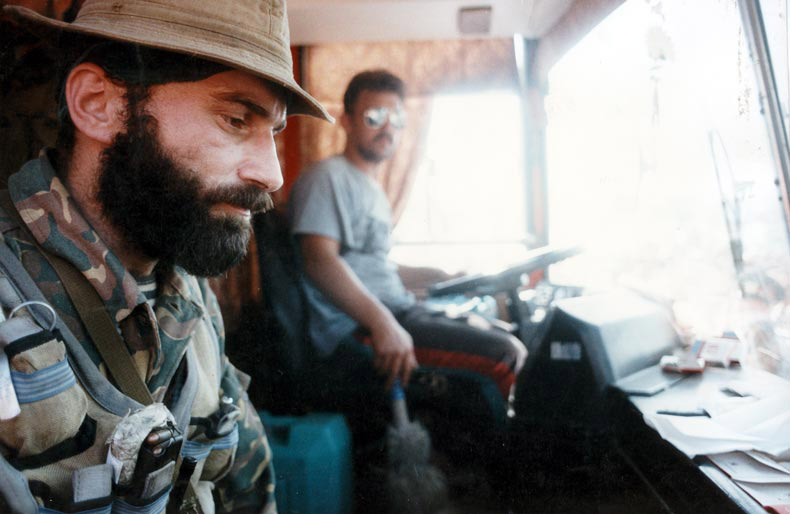
Shamil Basayev, Chechen militant Islamist and a prominent figure in the Chechen separatist movement

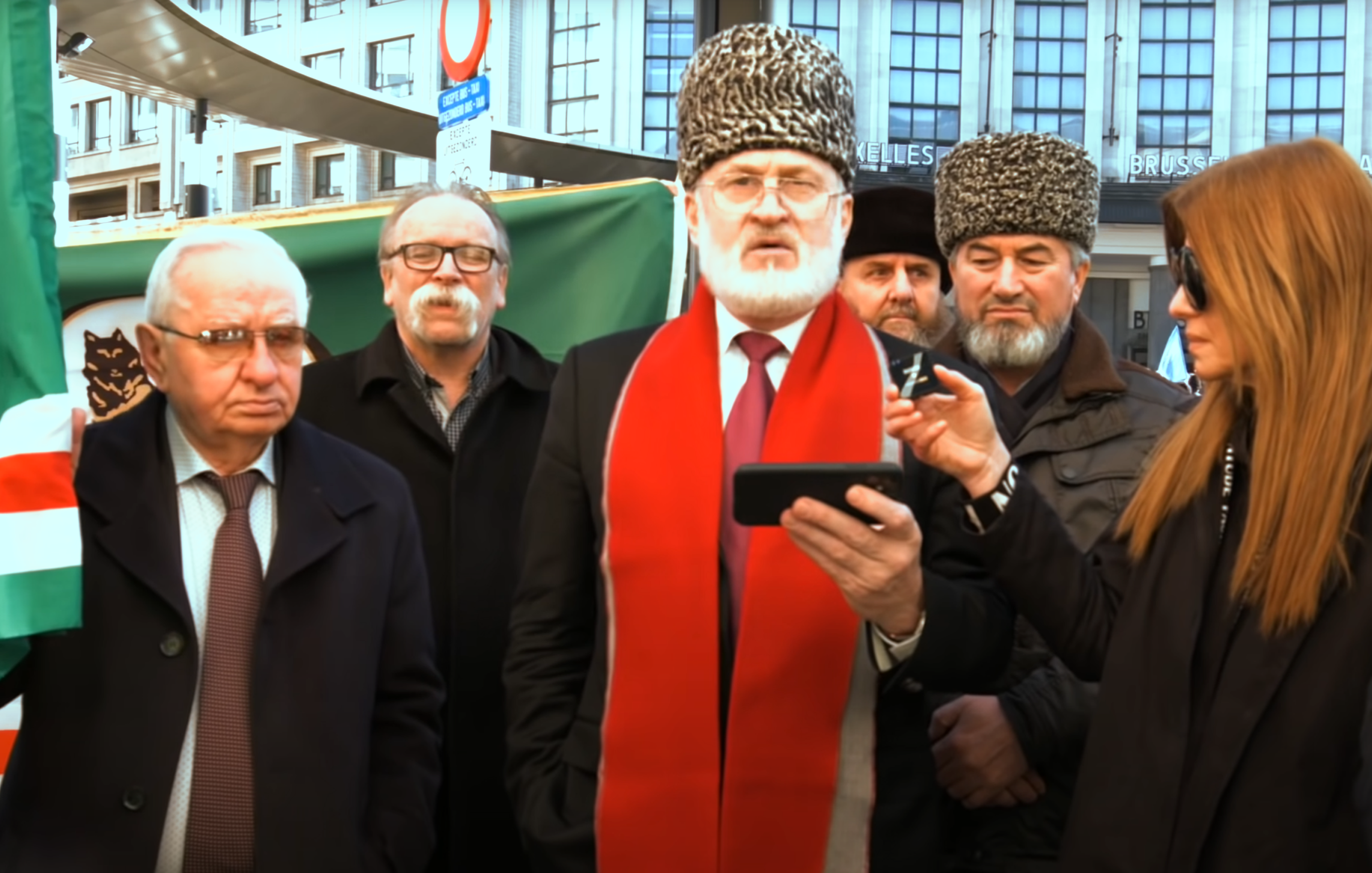
Akhmed Zakayev, the current head of the government of Chechnya—Ichkeria in-exile, on a rally in support of Ukraine in February 2022

President of Ukraine Volodymyr Zelenskyy and Kyrylo Budanov receiving awards from the government of Chechnya—Ichkeria in-exile, 2023

The presidents of this government were Dzhokhar Dudayev and Aslan Maskhadov, under whom the foreign minister was Ilyas Akhmadov, who was the spokesman for the president. Maskhadov had been elected for four years in an internationally monitored election in 1997, which took place after signing a peace agreement with Russia. In 2001, he issued a decree prolonging his office for one additional year; he was unable to participate in the 2003 presidential election since separatist parties were barred by the Russian government, and Maskhadov faced accusations of terrorist offenses in Russia. Maskhadov left Grozny and moved to the separatist-controlled areas of the south at the onset of the Second Chechen War. Maskhadov was unable to influence a number of warlords who were holding effective control over Chechen territory, and his power was diminished as a result. Russian forces killed Maskhadov on 8 March 2005, and the assassination was widely criticized since it left no legitimate Chechen separatist leader with whom to conduct peace talks. Akhmed Zakayev, deputy prime minister and a foreign minister under Maskhadov, was appointed shortly after the 1997 election. He is currently living under asylum in England and heading the government of Ichkeria in-exile designated as a "terrorist organization" by Russia. Zakayev maintains political initiatives like the establishment of the units of Chechen volunteers fighting on the side of Ukraine in the Russo-Ukrainian war loyal to Ichkeria. Zakayev and others chose Abdul Khalim Saidullayev, a relatively unknown Islamic judge who was previously the host of an Islamic program on Chechen television, to replace Maskhadov following his death. On 17 June 2006, it was reported that Russian special forces killed Abdul Khalim Saidullayev in a raid in the Chechen town of Argun. On 10 July 2006, Shamil Basayev, who became one of the leaders of the Chechen rebel movement after the beginning of the Second Chechen War, was killed in a truck explosion during an arms deal.

The successor of Saidullayev became Doku Umarov. On 31 October 2007, Umarov abolished the Chechen Republic of Ichkeria and its presidency and in its place proclaimed the Caucasus Emirate with himself as its Emir. This change of status has been rejected by many Chechen politicians and military leaders who continue to support the existence of the republic.

== Human rights ==
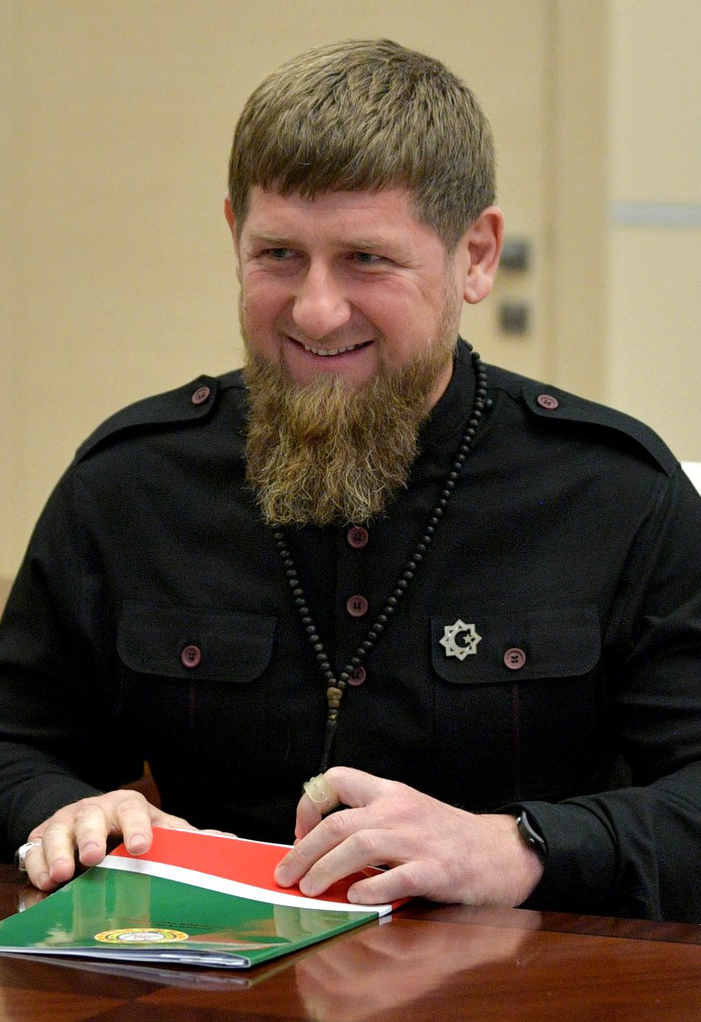
Chechen leader Ramzan Kadyrov in 2018

Тhe Internal Displacement Monitoring Center reports that after hundreds of thousands of ethnic Russians and Chechens fled their homes following inter-ethnic and separatist conflicts in Chechnya in 1994 and 1999, more than 150,000 people still remain displaced in Russia today.

Нuman rights organizations criticized the conduct of the 2005 parliamentary elections as unfairly influenced by the central Russian government and military. In 2006, Human Rights Watch reported that pro-Russian Chechen forces under the command of Ramzan Kadyrov, as well as Russian federal police personnel, used torture to get information about separatist forces. "If you are detained in Chechnya, you face a real and immediate risk of torture. And there is little chance that your torturer will be held accountable", said Holly Cartner, Director of the Europe and Central Asia division of the Human Rights Watch.

In 2009, the U.S. government-financed American organization Freedom House included Chechnya in the "Worst of the Worst" list of most repressive societies in the world, together with Burma, North Korea, Tibet, and others. Memorial considers Chechnya under Kadyrov to be a totalitarian regime.

On February 1, 2009, The New York Times released extensive evidence to support allegations of consistent torture and executions under the Kadyrov government. The accusations were sparked by the assassination in Austria of a former Chechen rebel who had gained access to Kadyrov's inner circle, 27-year-old Umar Israilov.

On July 1, 2009, Amnesty International released a detailed report covering the human rights violations committed by the Russian Federation against Chechen citizens. Among the most prominent features was that those abused had no method of redress against assaults, ranging from kidnapping to torture, while those responsible were never held accountable. This led to the conclusion that Chechnya was being ruled without law, being run into further devastating destabilization.

On 10 March 2011, Human Rights Watch reported that since Chechenization, the government has pushed for enforced Islamic dress code. The president Ramzan Kadyrov is quoted as saying "I have the right to criticize my wife. She doesn't [have the right to criticize me]. With us [in Chechen society], a wife is a housewife. A woman should know her place. A woman should give her love to us [men]... She would be [man's] property. And the man is the owner. Here, if a woman does not behave properly, her husband, father, and brother are responsible. According to our tradition, if a woman fools around, her family members kill her... That's how it happens, a brother kills his sister or a husband kills his wife... As a president, I cannot allow for them to kill. So, let women not wear shorts...". He has also openly defended honor killings on several occasions.

On 9 July 2017, Russian newspaper Novaya Gazeta reported that a number of people were extrajudicially executed on the night of 26 January 2017. It published a list of 27 names of the people known to be dead, but stressed that the list is "not all [of those killed]"; the newspaper asserted that 50 people may have been executed. Some of the dead were gay, but not all. The killings appeared to have been precipitated by the death of a policeman; according to the author of the report, Elena Milashina, the victims were executed for engaging in terrorism.

In December 2021, up to 50 family members of critics of the Kadyrov government were abducted in a wave of mass kidnappings beginning on 22 December. In a case-study published during the same year, Freedom House reported that Kadyrov also conducts a total transnational repression campaign against Chechen exiles outside of Russia, including assassinations of critics and digital intimidation.

=== LGBT rights ===
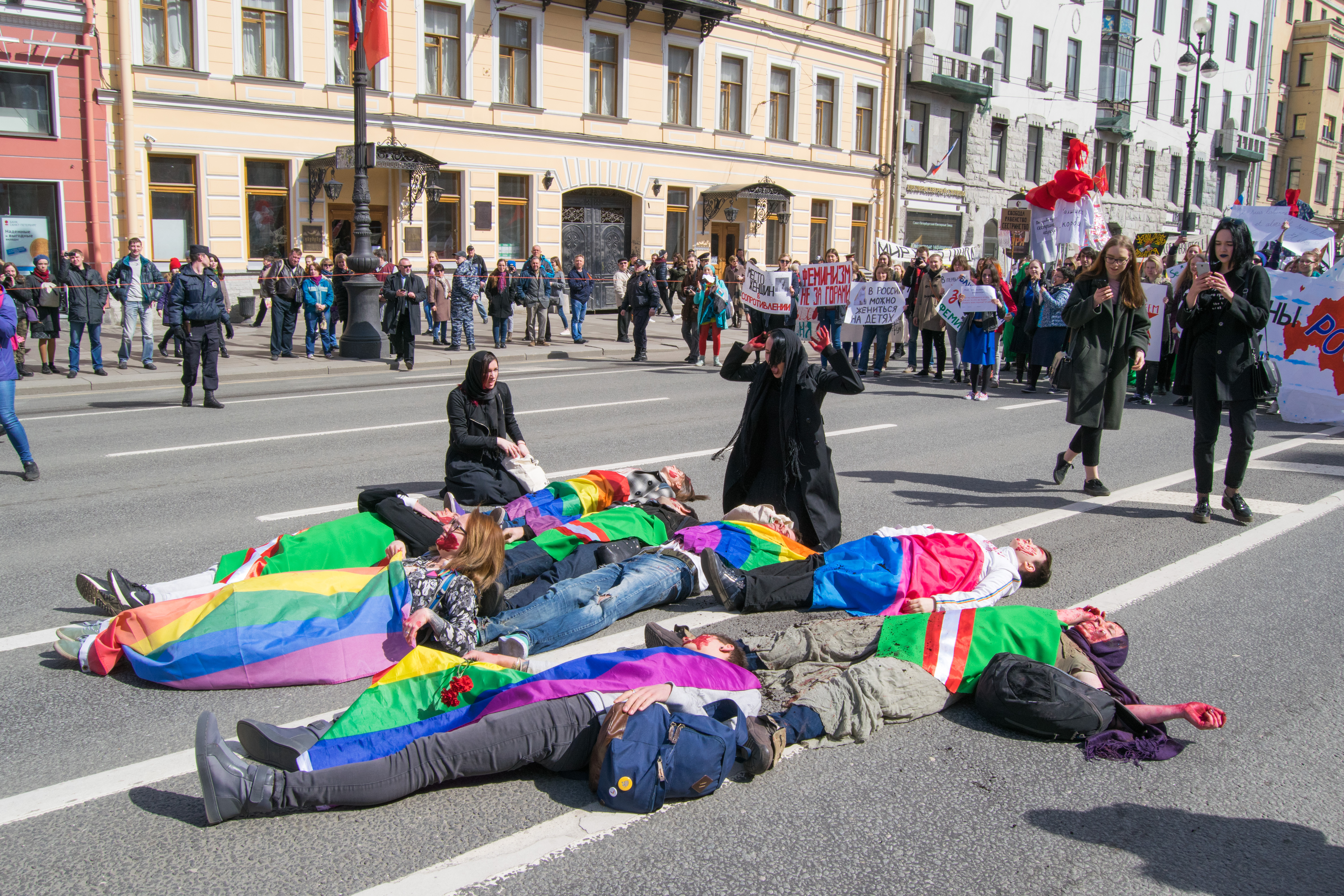
A public die-in demonstration, "Chechen mothers mourn their children", was staged on 1 May 2017 after a purge on Nevsky Prospect in Saint Petersburg, to protest the persecution of gay men in Chechnya.

Although homosexuality is officially legal in Chechnya per Russian law, it is de facto illegal. Chechen authorities have reportedly arrested, imprisoned and killed persons based on their perceived sexual orientation.

In 2017, it was reported by Novaya Gazeta and human rights groups that Chechen authorities had set up concentration camps, one of which is in Argun, where gay men are interrogated and subjected to physical violence. On 27 June 2018, the Parliamentary Assembly of the Council of Europe noted "cases of abduction, arbitrary detention, and torture ... with the direct involvement of Chechen law enforcement officials and on the orders of top-level Chechen authorities" and expressed dismay "at the statements of Chechen and Russian public officials denying the existence of LGBTI people in the Chechen Republic". Kadyrov's spokesman Alvi Karimov told Interfax that gay people "simply do not exist in the republic" and made an approving reference to honor killings by family members "if there were such people in Chechnya". In a 2021 Council of Europe report into anti-LGBTI hate-crimes, rapporteur Foura ben Chikha described the "state-sponsored attacks carried out against LGBTI people in Chechnya in 2017" as "the single most egregious example of violence against LGBTI people in Europe that has occurred in decades".

On 11 January 2019, it was reported that another "gay purge" had begun in the country in December 2018, with several men and women being detained. The Russian LGBT Network believes that around 40 people were detained and two killed.

== Economy ==
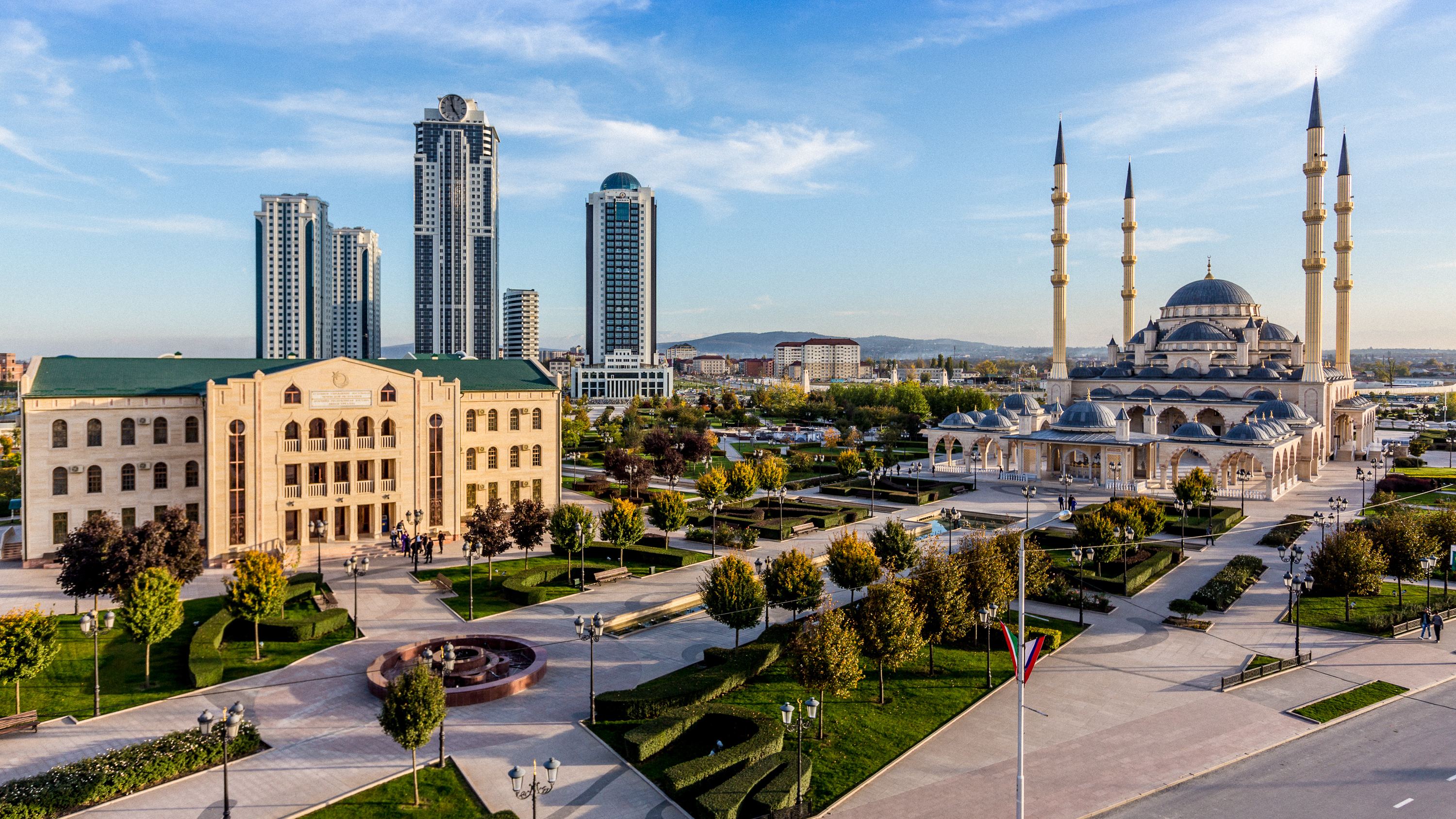
Grozny in 2013, with the "Heart of Chechnya" Mosque and Grozny towers

During the First Chechen War, the Chechen economy fell apart. In 1994, the separatists planned to introduce a new currency, but the change did not occur due to the re-taking of Chechnya by Russian troops in the Second Chechen War.

The economic situation in Chechnya has improved considerably since 2000. According to the New York Times, major efforts to rebuild Grozny have been made, and improvements in the political situation have led some officials to consider setting up a tourism industry, though there are claims that construction workers are being irregularly paid and that poor people have been displaced.

Chechnya's unemployment was 67% in 2006 and fell to 21.5% in 2014.

Total revenue of the budget of Chechnya for 2017 was 59.2 billion rubles. Of these, 48.5 billion rubles were grants from the federal budget of the Russian Federation.

In late 1970s, Chechnya produced up to 20 million tons of oil annually, production declined sharply to approximately 3 million tons in the late 1980s, and to below 2 million tons before 1994, first (1994–1996) second Russian invasion of Chechnya (1999) inflicted material damage on the oil-sector infrastructure, oil production decreased to 750,000 tons in 2001 only to increase to 2 million tons in 2006, by 2012 production was 1 million tons.

== Culture ==
The culture of Chechnya is based on the native traditions of Chechen people. Chechen mythology along with art have helped shape the culture for over 1,000 years.

From April 2024, all music must have a tempo between 80 and 116 beats per minute, to comply with Chechen traditions. Borrowing musical culture from other peoples is not allowed.
