= Azamat-Yurt =

Village in Gudermessky District, Russia

Coordinates: 43°25′07″N 46°17′07″E

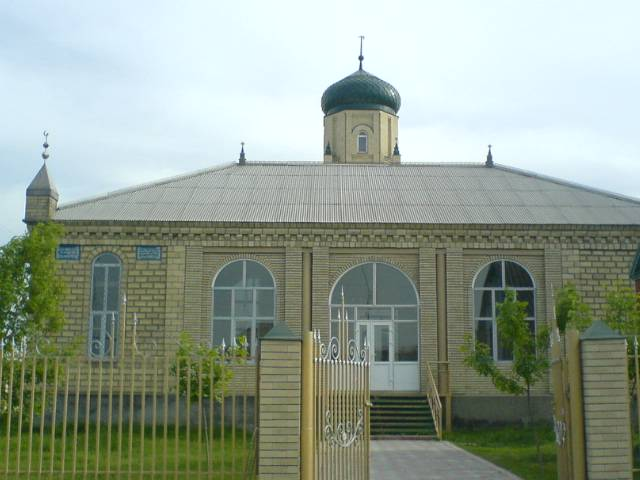
Mosque located in the village of Azamat-Yurt

Azamat-Yurt (Russian: Азамат-Юрт, Chechen: Азамат-Йурт) is a rural locality (a selo) in Gudermessky District, Chechnya.

== Administrative and municipal status ==
Municipally, Azamat-Yurt is incorporated as Azamat-Yurtovskoye rural settlement. It is the administrative center of the municipality and is the only settlement included in it.

== Geography ==
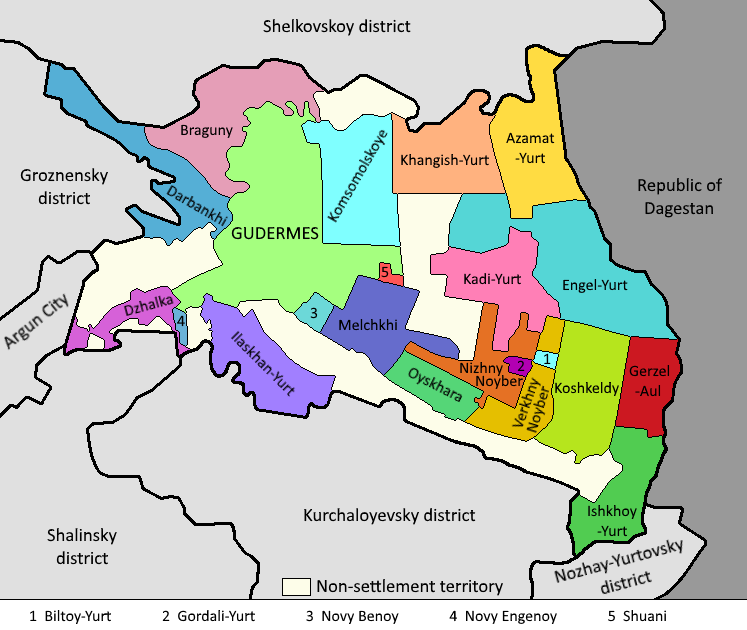
Map of Gudermessky District. Azamat-Yurt is in the north-east

Azamat-Yurt is located on the right bank of the Terek River. It is 19 kilometres (12 mi) north-east of the city of Gudermes and 58 kilometres (36 mi) north-east of the city of Grozny.

The nearest settlements to Azamat-Yurt are Paraboch in the north, Kharkovskoye and Pervomayskoye in the north-east, Engel-Yurt, Kadi-Yurt and Sovetskoye in the south-east, Komsomolskoye in the south-west, and Khangish-Yurt in the west.

== Name ==
The name of the village comes from two words: Azamat, the name of the founder, and yurt, a Chechen word for a village.

== History ==
Azamat-Yurt was founded in 1859.

In 1944, after the genocide and deportation of the Chechen and Ingush people and the Chechen-Ingush ASSR was abolished, the village of Azamat-Yurt was renamed, and settled by people from the neighbouring republic of Dagestan. From 1944 to 1957, it was a part of the Dagestan ASSR.

In 1957, when the Vaynakh people returned and the Chechen-Ingush ASSR was restored, the village regained its old name, Azamat-Yurt.

== Population ==
- 1990 Census: 923
- 2002 Census: 1,226
- 2010 Census: 1,500
- 2019 estimate: 1,941

According to the results of the 2010 Census, the majority of residents of Azamat-Yurt were ethnic Chechens.

== Teips ==
Members of mainly the following teips live in Azamat-Yurt:

- Aitkhalloy,
- Shonoy,
- Shirdoy,
- Tsontoroy.

== Education ==
Azamat-Yurt hosts one secondary school.
