= Battle of Gudermes =

- Part of the First Chechen War
Date	14–23 December 1995
Location	Gudermes, Russia
Result	Pyrrhic Russian victory
Territorial changes	Russian forces capture or occupy Gudermes

Belligerents
Russia	Chechen Republic of Ichkeria

Commanders and leaders
Leonid Valov †; Vladimir Lastochkin †; Alexey Borvkovich †	(Chechen Republic of Ichkeria) Salman Raduev (Chechen Republic of Ichkeria) Khunkar Israfilov (Chechen Republic of Ichkeria) Sultan Geliskhanov

Units involved
Russian Armed Forces: Russian Ground Forces	(Chechen Republic of Ichkeria) Chechen fighters

Strength
150+ Russian troops	600 Chechen fighters

Casualties and losses
100+ killed and wounded	Unknown
- Dozens of civilians killed or missing

The Battle of Gudermes took place in December 1995. was a battle of the First Chechen War, in which Russian armed forces regained control of Gudermes. It was characterized by large losses among the civilian population and mutual accusations of genocide.

== Prelude ==
On July 30, 1995, a ceasefire agreement was signed between the Russian Federation and the Chechen Republic of Ichkeria, but in December, Chechen militants declared the region's independence in an attempt to sabotage elections falsified by federal authorities. In early December, they seized the administration buildings. These actions marked a return to the hot phase of the conflict.

The day before, the leadership of the Russian Armed Forces announced the start of an operation to take the city, which had been under the control of Chechen militants since December 14. According to TASS, the Russian command postponed the offensive so that civilians could leave the city.

== The battle ==
On December 14, fierce fighting broke out. Russian troops used artillery and aerial bombardment, which destroyed most of the city. On December 19, a ground assault on the city began. The most intense fighting took place near the railway station and the local military headquarters, where 150 Russian troops were surrounded by 600 CRI fighters. By December 23, the CRI units retreated on the orders of Aslan Maskhadov and the Russian Armed Forces established control over the city.

== Aftermath ==
According to official data, the Russian military (troops) suffered more than 100 killed or wounded as a result of the fighting. At least one Ural truck and at least two armoured personnel carriers were also destroyed. According to eyewitnesses who fled the city, the number of civilian casualties is in the hundreds. According to statements by local pro-Russian authorities, the actual losses among the civilian population are much lower.

Some of the residents who fled the city accused the rebels of looting. Many of the refugees interviewed claimed that the Russian Armed Forces were indiscriminately shelling areas where there was no fighting. Bukhari Muskhanov, 43, who was hiding with his family in a basement:

Russian artillery fired from a hill near the TV tower, shelling every street. Within two days my children were sick and coughing, but every time we tried to leave the city the shooting became more intense.

== Reactions ==
Russian Interior Minister Anatoly Kulikov called the actions of the CRI Armed Forces genocide and said they were ready to sacrifice the last Chechen. Pro-Russian regional leader Doku Zavgayev justified the federal forces' actions and said Chechnya could not turn into another Afghanistan. In his opinion, the outcome was provoked by CRI fighters who had fortified themselves in the hospital, making it a military target.
