= Guerrilla phase of the Second Chechen War (2006) =

Part of a Russian war in the Caucasus

== Timeline ==
=== January ===
- January 2–5 - Gimry fighting - 8-30 rebel fighters escaped up to 3000 Russian soldiers.
- January 3 - Local and federal forces clashed for three days with the guerrillas in Dagestan's Untsukulsky District. Several dead were reported on each side in the operation in which the Russian Marines, artillery and aviation were used.
- January 14 - Security forces killed Shamil Abidov, a Dagestan-born top guerrilla commander operating in Chechnya and Dagestan, Russian sources reported.
- January 27 - Amir Kamal (Lechi Eskiyev), the commander of Chechen guerrillas operating in the northern part of Chechnya, was killed along with several other people in a police operation in Khasavyurt in Dagestan.
- January 30 - Clashes between Russian federal forces and Chechen separatists left five Russian soldiers dead and 10 wounded.

=== February ===
- February 8 - At least 13 Russian Army special forces troops were killed and 22 injured in explosion at Russian military barracks in Chechnya.
- February 9 - Seven soldiers, two policemen, and five rebels reportedly killed in clashes in Chechnya.
- February 10 - Russian security forces clashed with guerrillas in the village of Tukuy-Mekteb in Russia's Stavropol Krai. Several guerrillas, allegedly belonging to the Nogaysky Battalion, as well as several policemen were killed.
- February 27 - Magomed Chakhkiyev, Ingush politician and father-in-law of Ingushetia's President Murat Zyazikov, was kidnapped from his car by unknown armed men in Nazran. He was freed two months later after ransom.

=== March ===
- March 22 - A group of assailants fatally shot Ruslan Aliyev, the chief administrator of mountainous Botlikhsky District of Dagestan, during a fierce gunbattle; Aliyev's vehicle was struck by gunfire in the center of Makhachkala on the city's most guarded street. On March 10, Magomed Magomedov, deputy head of the republican Criminal Investigation Department, was killed in Makhachkala by a bomb planted underneath his car. Two days later, March 12, a senior officer from the Organized Crime Department was shot dead in Makhachkala, and another was killed on March 21 in the town of Buinaksk.
- March 28 - Negotiated surrender of Chechen warlord Sultan Geliskhanov.

=== April ===
- April 1 - Two guerrillas were killed and one arrested in the police operation in Nazran, Ingushetia. Two policemen were also killed.
- April 15 - Two Russian soldiers were killed and five wounded others in a rebel ambush in southern Chechnya.
- April 25 - A shoot-out took place in the government compound in the center of the capital Grozny between security forces of the Moscow-backed Chechen Premier Ramzan Kadyrov and the Moscow-backed Chechen President Alu Alkhanov. There were conflicting reports on the incident and casualties.

=== May ===
- May 10 - Local guerrilla commanders Timur Maayev and Bilal Edilsultanov were reported killed in the village of Novye Atagi southeast of Grozny.
- May 13 - Three Russian soldiers had been killed and three wounded during the previous week, RIA Novosti reported.
- May 17 - A military special forces convoy came under intensive small arms fire on the outskirts of the village of Nikitikha in Kurchaloyevsky District of Chechnya, resulting in five soldiers killed and six other wounded. An explosion in Ingushetia killed seven people, among them the republic's police chief and acting first deputy Interior Minister Dzhabrail Kostoyev, his two bodyguards, and four civilians.
- May 23 - Four Russian Interior Ministry intelligence officers were killed and three others wounded when about 15 guerillas attacked an Internal Troops post in Vedensky District.
- May 31 - Two or three guerillas and a policeman died in a security operation in the village of Nesterovskaya in Ingushetia's Sunzhensky District. Security forces reportedly summarily executed a civilian who resided in the house where the guerrillas hid.

=== June ===
- June 4 - Two security officials died in Nazran, Ingushetia, when guerrillas opened fire at their car.
- June 9 - Two officials were killed minutes apart in Ingushetia by gunmen wearing black uniforms, berets, and masks. The assassinations appeared to be another round of carefully timed attacks against the government. First, Galina Gubina, an administrator responsible for helping ethnic Russian families resettle in the region was gunned down. Then, Musa Nalgiyev, the commander of Ingushetia's OMON riot police, was killed as he drove his three young children to school. Nalgiyev's children were also killed, as were the commander's two guards. In recent weeks, rebels in Ingushetia have also kidnapped Magomed Chakhiyev, a lawmaker and the father-in-law of President Murat Zyazikov, and have attempted to kill Health Minister Magomed Aliskhanov. Galina Gubina earlier escaped an attempt on her life two years ago when a bomb went off under Gubina's car, severely wounding her.
- June 17 - Abdul-Halim Sadulayev, the Ichkerian president since the death of Aslan Maskhadov, and at least two FSB agents and Chechen militiamen killed and five wounded during a firefight in the town of Argun.

=== July ===
- July 4 - Rebel fighters ambushed a motorized column of the GRU Spetsnaz from forest near the village of Avtury, killing at least seven servicemen and wounding as many as 25 others. According to Chechen guerrilla sources, at least 20 soldiers were killed. On the same day, Russian president Vladimir Putin again declared the war to be over.
- July 10 - Leading Chechen warlord Shamil Basayev and three of his fighters were killed in the mysterious truck explosion in the Ingush village of Ekazhevo.
- July 13 - Moscow-backed Chechen forces ambushed a group of about 15-25 young guerrilla recruits near the village of Ishkhoi-Yurt on Chechnya's eastern border with Dagestan, killing several of them.
- July 26 - Four militants killed in a building burned down by security forces in Makhachkala, Dagestan.
- July 28 - A gun attack by the rebels killed a colonel and two officers on the Ingush part of the Transcaucasian Highway.

=== August ===
- August 3 - Two Russian Interior Ministry servicemen were shot dead in Nazran, Ingushetia, while four local servicemen died after their car crashed in Chechnya.
- August 8 - A car bomb and gun attack killed prosecutor Bitar Bitarov in Dagestan and wounded his two bodyguards. A motorcade including the armored car carrying Dagestani Interior Minister Adilgerei Magomedtagirov was also fired on as it approached the scene to investigate, and two police officers accompanying him were shot and killed. The next day two hand grenades targeted the house of Ingushetia's Nazranovsky District prosecutor, Girkhan Khazbiyev, killing his brother and injuring 13 family members.
- August 9 - A string of assassination attempts against the Interior Ministry officials in Dagestan and Ingushetia result in deaths of several and injuries of more than a dozen people, including the killing of a prosecutor in Dagestan.
- August 24 - Four Russian Interior Ministry servicemen were killed in a blast at their base in Grozny's Oktyabrsky district.
- August 26 - Three Russian policemen were killed an attack in Ingushetia near the border with North Ossetia.
- August 29 - A former police chief of an anti-organized crime department in southern Russia was gunned down near a hospital in central Nazran and died at the scene. Akhmed Murzabekov, a district police chief in Ingushetia, was shot three times but survived a previous assassination attempt on August 23. The official said a rapid reaction group following Murzabekov engaged the attackers, possibly wounding one of them, but added that the assailants escaped.

=== September ===
- September 6 - A mine blast killed four Russian Interior Ministry's soldiers on an APC in the North Ossetian village of Mayskoye.
- September 11 - Three army generals, including Major-General Vladimir Sorokin, chief of logistics of Russia's North Caucasus Military District, and nine other soldiers died in an army Mi-8 helicopter crashed in a suburb of Vladikavkaz, North Ossetia. The Ossetian rebel group claimed responsibility.
- September 13 - Eight police were killed and about 20 wounded when Chechen and Ingush policemen fired on each other in the border clash incident. Among the dead was the Chechen OMON Chief of Staff, Buvadi Dukhiyev.
- September 17 - Top Chechen guerrilla commander Isa Muskiyev and his brother Ali were reportedly killed in a police operation in the village of Tsotsin-Yurt.
- September 20 - Top Chechen guerrilla commander Sultan Khadisov (Amir Musa) was killed.
- September 21 - Five Sverdlovsk OMON special police troopers were shot dead in their UAZ vehicle. The attack took place in Grozny's Staropromyslovsky district. In other incident, the head of the Shatoysky District military commissariat was killed.
- September 23 - Four servicemen from a special forces unit of the Internal Troops were wounded and three gunmen killed in a shootout near the settlement of Yukerchu-Gonkha. In another incident, a group of servicemen was the target of a homemade explosive device on the outskirts of the village of Dzhani-Vedeno, killing two of them and injuring one.

=== November ===
- November 3 - A deputy commander of the Oryol Oblast OMON detachment died and four were wounded in the URAL truck explosion on a bridge in Grozny; one died of his injuries. Previously, four policemen from Oryol have been killed in Chechnya in 2006.
- November 8 - Chechen separatists killed at least seven Mordovian OMON members in an ambush near the village of Dair in southern Chechnya; a major of police was seriously wounded. In a separate incidents two servicemen were killed and one wounded in a blast and a gunfight.
- November 26 - Abu Hafs al-Urduni, a Jordanian-born guerrilla commander, was killed along with four Chechen guerrillas in a security operation in the Dagestani town of Khasavyurt.
