= Kizlyar–Pervomayskoye hostage crisis =

Hostage crisis in January 1996 during the First Chechen War

Kizlyar–Pervomayskoye crisis
- Part of the First Chechen War
Date	9–18 January 1996 (1 week and 2 days)
Location	Kizlyar and Pervomayskoye Sovetskoye, Dagestan, Russia
Result	Chechen strategic victory (successful escape of most separatist fighters)

Belligerents
Chechen Republic of Ichkeria	Russian Federation

Commanders and leaders
(Chechen Republic of Ichkeria) Khunkar-Pasha Israpilov; (Chechen Republic of Ichkeria) Salman Raduyev; (Chechen Republic of Ichkeria) Turpal-Ali Atgeriyev; (Chechen Republic of Ichkeria) Aidamir Abalayev	(Russia) Boris Yeltsin: (Russia) Viktor Chernomyrdin; Gen. Mikhail Barsukov (Director of FSB); Gen. Anatoly Kulikov (Interior Minister); Andrei Krestyaninov † (SOBR commander)

Units involved
Armed groups (in Kizlyar) of: Aydimir Abalayev (about 70 people); Turpal Atgeriev (40 people); Suleiman Raduyev (brother of Salman Raduyev) (about 60 people); Khunkar-Pasha Israpilov (about 30 people); Armed formation under the command of Musa Charayev (about 40 people)	Kizlyar: 3693th Battalion MVD Interior Troops; Pervomayskoye: 29th OSN "Bulat" (Moscow); 22nd Spetsnaz Brigade, GRU; Alpha Group

Strength
Kizlyar: 240–250; Pervomayskoye: ~439	Kizlyar: Unknown; Pervomayskoye: 2,500 Infantry; 32 Mortars and artillery pieces; 3 Grad rocket launchers; 54 infantry fighting vehicles; 22 BTR; 4 BRDM; Several tanks and combat helicopters

Casualties and losses
90 killed (Russian claim); 70 killed (Chechen claim)	63 MVD Internal Troops killed (Kizlyar); 126 Russian troops killed, 95 wounded (all forces); 2 Mi-8 helicopters and 2 APCs destroyed
- 15 civilians killed and 11 POWs killed, several hundred wounded, 250 homes destroyed in Pervomayskoye

The Kizlyar–Pervomayskoye hostage crisis, also known in Russia as the terrorist act in Kizlyar (Russian: Теракт в Кизляре), occurred in January 1996 during the First Chechen War of 1994 to 1996. What began as a raid by Chechen separatist forces led by Salman Raduyev against a federal military airbase near Kizlyar, Dagestan, became a hostage crisis involving thousands of civilians, most of whom were quickly released. The situation culminated in a battle between the Chechens and Russian special forces in the village of Pervomayskoye, which was destroyed by Russian artillery-fire. Although the Chechens escaped from the siege with some of their hostages, at least 26 hostages and more than 200 combatants on both sides died. One third of the homes in Pervomayskoye were destroyed.

== Kizlyar ==
On January 9, 1996, about 200 Chechen guerrillas led by Salman Raduyev, calling themselves Lone Wolf and allegedly acting on orders by Chechen president Dzhokhar Dudayev (although Dudayev would later deny it), launched a raid similar to the one triggering the Budyonnovsk hospital hostage crisis. The city of Kizlyar in the neighbouring republic of Dagestan, the site of the first Imperial Russian fort in the region (and many historical battles), was chosen as the target due to its proximity and easy access 3 kilometres (2 mi) from the Chechen border across flat terrain. The guerrillas began the raid with a nighttime assault on a military airbase outside Kizlyar, where they destroyed at least two helicopters and killed 33 servicemen, before withdrawing.

At 6 am, pursued by Russian reinforcements, the withdrawing Chechen fighters entered the town itself and took an estimated 2,000 to 3,400 people hostage (according to official Russian accounts, there were "no more than 1,200" hostages taken). The hostages were rounded up in multiple locations and taken to the occupied city hospital and a nearby high-rise building. Field commander Khunkar-Pasha Israpilov later said that he took command of the operation from Raduyev after the latter failed in his mission to destroy the airbase, an ammunition factory and other military and police installations in and around the city. At least 46 people died on January 9.

The rebels initially demanded all Russian troops to be withdrawn from Chechnya, but then changed their demand to being granted safe passage back to separatist-controlled areas of Chechnya. All but about 120 of the captives were released the next day, but the rebels threatened to kill the remaining hostages if they were not granted safe passage. Although on January 12 the rebels freed the women and children, they said they would release the male hostages only if four Russian officials took their places. Liberal opposition politicians Grigory Yavlinsky and Yegor Gaidar quickly agreed to participate in the exchange, but retired army generals Boris Gromov and Alexander Lebed refused to enter captivity.

An alternative agreement was negotiated by the Interior Minister of Dagestan, Magomed Abdurazakov: the rebels would be allowed to return to Chechnya through a safe corridor, in a convoy of 13 vehicles with about 150 hostages volunteering as human shields to deter a Russian ambush. Unknown to Abdurazakov, at least 150 Russian paratroopers were flown from their base in Grozny to intercept the convoy as it entered Chechnya.

== Pervomayskoye ==
The rebels headed toward Chechnya in a column of eleven buses and two trucks, but were stopped short of the border between the two republics when a Russian attack helicopter opened fire on the convoy's lead vehicle, a Dagestani police car. According to some reports the border bridge was blown up as well, but journalists later reported it intact. The Chechens captured 37 Novosibirsk OMON special-police officers, who surrendered at a border checkpoint. The convoy turned and sought cover in Pervomayskoye (also translated as Pervomayskoe, Pervomaiskoye or Pervomaiskoe), a Dagestani village of about 1,200 residents. The rebels installed most of the hostages in the village school and the mosque and set up defensive positions, putting the captured policemen and some civilian hostages to work digging trenches. According to Russian state agency Itar-Tass, an additional 100 hostages were taken from the village.

Russian president Boris Yeltsin detailed operations against the hostage-takers on national television, famously gesticulating how the "38 snipers" were supposed to cover the village and eliminate all the rebels. Yeltsin's remarks were widely ridiculed, and later disavowed. Before launching an assault on the village, Russian officials claimed that the rebels publicly hanged six captured Russian servicemen. Over the next three days Russian special-forces detachments from a number of services, numbering about 500 and supported by tanks, armored vehicles and attack helicopters, repeatedly tried to penetrate the village but they were beaten back, with at least 12 killed. Among the dead was the commander of Moscow special police force SOBR, Andrei Krestyaninov; surviving commandos described the fighting as "hell".

I want everybody to understand that now we have a situation which is not about liberating hostages. If you're following military rules, the task here is to capture a military fortress held by a battalion strength unit in urban conditions. This is about liberating a city [sic].

— FSB General Alexander Mikhailov

After the assault attempts failed, Russia's Interior Minister Anatoly Kulikov and Federal Security Service (FSB) Director Mikhail Barsukov declared that the hostage-takers had executed the captives. FSB General Alexander Mikhailov announced that the Chechens "had shot or hanged all or most" of the hostages, and federal forces now planned to "flatten" Pervomayskoye; Russian prime minister Viktor Chernomyrdin also claimed that no hostages remained alive. Russian commanders then ordered their forces to open fire on the village with mortars, howitzers and rocket launchers. American correspondent Michael Specter reported that the Russians were "firing into Pervomaskoye at the rate of one a minute – the same Grad missiles they used to largely destroy the Chechen capital Grozny when the conflict began." Specter noted: "The Grads fell with monstrous concussive force throughout the day. In this town, about 6 kilometres (4 mi) away, where journalists have been herded by Russian forces, windows cracked at the force of the repeated blasts ... Mikhailov said today that he was adding up the Chechen casualties, not by number of corpses, 'but by the number of arms and legs.'" Barsukov later joked that "the usage of the Grad multiple rocket launchers was mainly psychological", and CNN reported that "the general's answers were openly mocking." Among Russian troops deployed to the village was an FSB agent from Nalchik, Alexander Litvinenko, whose ad-hoc squad came under friendly fire from Grad rockets. Heavy losses (including friendly-fire incidents) triggered a collapse in morale among the Russian forces. Russian military analyst Pavel Felgenhauer reported that "based on information from observers and participants of the fighting, it can be concluded that Interior Ministry officers were on the verge of mutiny." It was reported that demoralized, cold and hungry Russian troops begged the locals for alcohol and cigarettes in exchange for ammunition.

A large group of relatives of the hostages gathered near security checkpoints 10 kilometres (6.2 mi) from the village and silently watched the bombardment. Russian authorities tried to minimize coverage of the crisis by blocking access to the scene with guard dogs, turning journalists away with warning shots and confiscating their equipment. The dogs injured several journalists (including an ABC cameraman and a correspondent for The Christian Science Monitor), and a reporter's car was fired on at a military checkpoint after being permitted to cross. Russian forces turned away relief workers, including representatives of Doctors Without Borders and the International Committee of the Red Cross. Reporters Without Borders protested Russian intimidation of the press in Pervomayskoye, its ban of medical assistance to civilians and its refusal to permit evacuation of the wounded.

On the eighth night, despite Kulikov's assertion that three rings of security forces had surrounded the village, the Chechens broke out and escaped in the early morning of January 18, 1996. They took with them about 20 Russian police hostages and several dozen civilians; a number of wounded guerrillas were carried on stretchers by the hostages (who also carried ammunition), while about 20 fighters too seriously injured to be moved were left behind. Both sides suffered heavy losses. Chechen commander Turpal-Ali Atgeriyev said 17 of the 40 Chechen fighters leading the breakout died as they fought their way through Russian positions and across a minefield. According to Memorial, the Chechens killed nearly all of a blocking detachment from the Spetsnaz GRU 22nd Brigade, including the intelligence chief of the 58th Army. The middle part of the rebel column with the wounded and the hostages suffered 26 fatalities, according to leader Aydemir Abdullayev (an ethnic Avar); the rear guard was commanded by Suleiman Bustayev. After the skirmish the column crossed the border river through a gas pipeline and ran across the frozen steppe, trying to reach safety before dawn, and a number of Chechen fighters were killed by strafing attacks of Russian Mi-24 helicopters during the pursuit. However, only three or four hostages lost their lives, and some of them escaped in the chaos.

A force of between 200 and 300 guerrillas arrived in the area from Chechnya, where rebel fighters grouped under the command of Maksud Ingulbayev (who was ordered by Dudayev). To aid the breakthrough they mounted a diversionary attack on the Russian lines from behind, briefly capturing a school building used by federal forces in the neighboring village of Sovetskoye (several kilometers from Pervomayskoye). The Chechen relief force, like Raduyev's detachment earlier, made its way undetected through Russian-patrolled areas of Chechnya and Dagestan; Russian officials later accused the residents of two nearby villages of collaboration with the rebels.

Russian forces entered a destroyed village strewn with the corpses of Chechen fighters, Dagestani civilians and Russian troops. After the battle a Russian soldier unintentionally fired a cannon on his BMP-1 infantry fighting vehicle, hitting another armored vehicle which exploded, and its fragments landed amongst the Alpha Group of the FSB, killing two commandos and injuring three. The Chechens claimed to still hold more than 60 hostages, who were evacuated to the separatist-controlled town of Novogroznensky (aka Novogrozny) in the Gudermessky District of Chechnya.

== Casualties ==
Salman Raduyev's January 1996 indictment by a Russian prosecutor stated that 37 Russian troops and 41 civilians were killed in Pervomayskoye. According to Yeltsin 82 hostages were rescued, but Chernomyrdin said that 42 were freed. The full extent of civilian casualties is uncertain; the Russian army denied access to the village by journalists during the attack, and independent observers were admitted only after the bodies of civilians were removed from the ruins.

According to Chechen separatist chief-of-staff Aslan Maskhadov, 90 Chechen fighters died during the crisis; Yeltsin reported that 153 Chechen fighters were killed and 30 captured. Western analysts estimated losses at 96 Chechen fighters and at least 26 civilians killed, plus about 200 federal casualties (including those killed at Kizlyar). The hostages evacuated by their Chechen captors from Pervomayskoye included at least a dozen captured servicemen and police officers.

On January 19, Raduyev proposed an exchange of the police hostages for the seriously-wounded fighters he had left behind, and the Chechens expressed their willingness to turn over the remaining civilian hostages to Dagestani authorities. A special resolution by the Russian State Duma granted a special amnesty for 11 captured guerrillas, who were then exchanged for the Novosibirsk policemen seized near Pervomayskoye; a CNN report said the prisoners were "12 Russian soldiers and six police officers". On January 27 the bodies of 26 dead Chechen fighters, swapped for civilian hostages and returned by Russian authorities through Dagestani intermediaries, were buried at the Tsotsin-Yurt village cemetery for the 400 Chechens killed fighting Russian forces during the Russian Civil War in 1919. The hostages freed in Pervomayskoye were interned in poor conditions in Russian filtration camps.

== Aftermath ==
The Russian government reacted to the "liberation of Pervomayskoye" by describing it as a success; Yeltsin initially said that "all the bandits have been destroyed, unless there are some still hiding underground", the operation was "planned and carried out correctly" and "is over with a minimum of losses to the hostages and our own people." Chernomyrdin said, "It is clear to everyone that it is pointless to talk to these people [Chechen separatists]. They are not the kind of people you can negotiate with." U.S. Secretary of Defense William Perry affirmed solidarity with Yeltsin's government, saying that Russia was justified in using military force in response to hostage-taking.

The operation triggered outrage in Dagestan and across Russia, especially in liberal circles. Grigory Yavlinsky said, "It is time to face the fact that we are in a real civil war now in Russia. This was not a hostage crisis. It is a hopeless war, and it was started by Boris Yeltsin." Yeltsin's human-rights commissioner, Sergei Kovalev, resigned from all his posts in protest of the "cruel punitive action" and Yegor Gaidar drafted a letter calling on Yeltsin not to run in the upcoming presidential elections. In a January 19 Interfax poll, 75 percent of respondents in Moscow and Saint Petersburg thought that all the "power ministers" should resign.

Russian federal forces' botched operation in Pervomayskoye to free the hostages not only failed to achieve the government's aims but led to the complete destruction of the village. The scale and methods of the Russian operations in Gudermes and Pervomayskoye, as well as the large number of civilian victims, point to a complete disregard for the safety and security of civilians in clear violation of international humanitarian law.

— Human Rights Watch

The incident's handling was widely criticized by Russian and foreign journalists, humanitarian organizations and human-rights groups. Russian press accounts (including an account from Izvestia correspondent Valery Yakov, who witnessed the fighting from inside the village) described a chaotic, overmanned and bungled Russian operation in Pervomayskoye; Pavel Felgenhauer wrote that the armed services involved in the assault displayed a "fantastic lack of coordination." An opinion piece in The New York Times said, "All this bloodshed and confusion was dressed up in Moscow with Soviet-style propaganda, including false claims about minimal Russian losses and the elimination of enemy forces. The use of force against terrorism should be commensurate with the threat and employed in a way that limits the loss of life. Military action should be accompanied by full disclosure of information about the conflict and casualties. The murderous assault on Pervomayskoye did not meet any of those tests."

The hostage crisis split the Chechens, with Salman Raduyev denounced by top Chechen rebel leaders. Polish fighter Mirosław Kuleba (Mehmed Borz) met Raduyev two months after the crisis, and believed that the latter may have intended to ignite a broader civil war in Dagestan. Kuleba felt that Raduyev tried to disguise in conversation that capturing a hospital and taking hostages had been planned and was not a desperate measure. In March 1996, Raduyev was shot in the head (in what some reports described as an ambush by rival guerrillas), and reportedly killed. However, he resurfaced after Dzhokhar Dudayev's death with his shattered head reconstructed with metal plates, and after the war became a seemingly mentally-unstable leader of an unruly private militia called General Dudayev's Army.

Raduyev was eventually captured by the Russians during the Second Chechen War in 2000. In 2001 he was sentenced to life imprisonment, dying in a prison colony in 2002. That year, Turpal-Ali Atgeriyev (sentenced to 15 years) also died in prison. Both of them died under mysterious circumstances. At least two other participants were sentenced for their roles in the raid during the 2000s, despite a 1996 amnesty: Aslanbek Alkhazurov to five years (he died in prison in 2004) and Husein Gaisumov to eight years. Of the other Chechen commanders in Pervomayskoye, Khunkar-Pasha Israpilov was killed in 2000 while leading another breakout from Grozny (with several other commanders, he went ahead to clear a path through a minefield). Suleiman Bustayev left Chechnya as a refugee to live in the European Union, where he became active in Akhmed Zakayev's Chechen government-in-exile.

== Related hostage crises ==
Turkish authorities coped effectively with the hijackers of the Panamanian-registered ferry Avrazya, which was captured on January 16 by an armed group of nine Turkish citizens of Caucasian origin who were sympathetic to the rebels in Pervomaiskoye. Turkish authorities, in continuous communication and negotiations with the captors and ignoring Russian demands for tough action, secured the safe release of the captives (177 mostly-Russian passengers and a Turkish crew of 55) and the surrender of the gunmen without bloodshed.

In another hostage-taking incident, on January 17 a group of 29 employees of the Kirov heating plant near Grozny (Russian engineers from Rostov) was kidnapped for ransom by a group led by Arbi Barayev. Thirty-eight other civilians (mostly ethnic Russians) had been kidnapped during the previous week in Chechnya's rebel-controlled Achkhoy-Martanovsky District, and offered in exchange for Chechen fighters in Russian captivity and civilian Chechen inmates of Russian filtration camps; their release was negotiated later that month.

== See also ==
- Beslan school hostage crisis
- Moscow theatre hostage crisis
