= Biltoy-Yurt =

Village in Gudermessky District, Russia

Coordinates: 43°17′07″N 46°19′05″E

Biltoy-Yurt (Russian: Бильтой-Юрт, Chechen: Керла-Билта, Kerla-Bilta) is a rural locality (a selo) in Gudermessky District, Chechnya.

== Administrative and municipal status ==
Municipally, Biltoy-Yurt is incorporated as Biltoy-Yurtovskoye rural settlement. It is the administrative center of the municipality and is the only settlement included in it.

== Geography ==
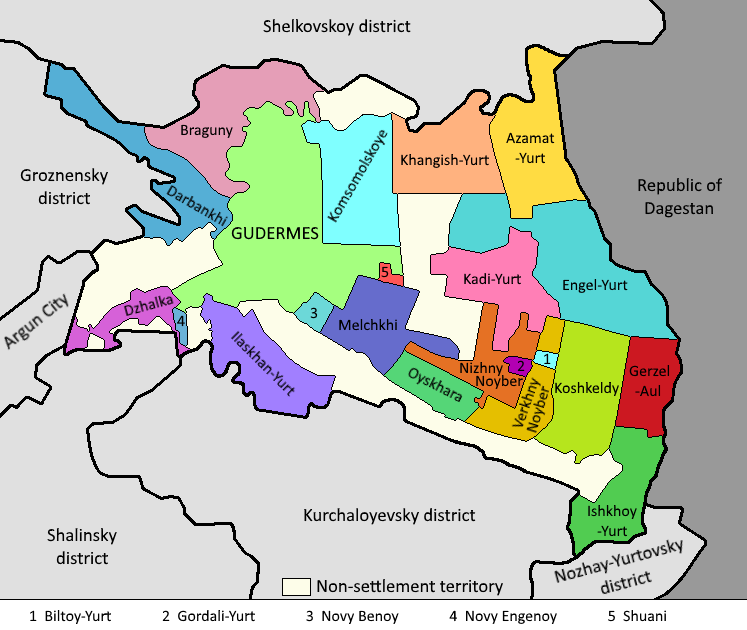
Map of Gudermessky District. Biltoy-Yurt is in the east

Biltoy-Yurt is located just north of the Caucasus Highway R-217. It is 20 kilometres (12 mi) south-east of the city of Gudermes and 57 kilometres (35 mi) east of the city of Grozny.

The nearest settlements to Biltoy-Yurt are Kadi-Yurt in the north, Engel-Yurt in the north-east, Gerzel-Aul and Koshkeldy in the south-east, and Gordali-Yurt, Nizhny Noyber and Verkhny Noyber in the south-west.

== History ==
Biltoy-Yurt was founded by people from the Nozhay-Yurtovsky District who were forced to relocate to the plains area after the devastating landslides in 1989. Residents of Biltoy-Yurt are mostly from the former village with the same name in Nozhay-Yurtovsky District, as well as from Bilty, Mekhkeshty, and Rogun-Kazha.

== Population ==
- 1990 Census: 206
- 2002 Census: 1,149
- 2010 Census: 1,872
- 2019 estimate: 2,078

According to the results of the 2010 Census, the majority of residents of Biltoy-Yurt (1,870 or 99,89%) were ethnic Chechens, with 2 people (0,11%) who did not specify their ethnic background.

== Education ==
Biltoy-Yurt hosts one secondary school.
