= Lecha Khultygov =

Chechen author, fighter

Lecha Abdulkhalakovich Khultigov

Personal details
- Born: Unknown
- Died: 21 June 1998 Grozny
- Nickname: Mountain Falcon

Military service
- Allegiance: Chechen Republic of Ichkeria
- Rank: Brigadier General
- Battles/wars: First Chechen War

Lecha Abdulkhalakovich Khultygov was a Chechen brigadier general and director of the national security service of the Chechen Republic of Ichkeria.

== First Chechen War ==
Lecha Khultygov was given the nickname "Mountain Falcon" by Dzhokhar Dudayev. Khultygov took part in 14 major combat operations and battles. Battles of "local significance" and local skirmishes with the enemy does not count. He is credited with having destroyed dozens of Russian armored vehicles and having downed 2 helicopters. A common tactic of Khultygov's was exhausting the enemy's forces by hitting them in the rear and delivering sudden attacks on the gathering of military vehicles and equipment. This method of warfare caused the enemy to panic and suppressed their will to resist. He emerged victorious from any seemingly hopeless situation. There was once counted 72 holes from shrapnel and bullets on his clothes. After getting seriously wounded during a battle, he walked on foot from Novogrozny to Ilshana-Yurt bleeding, and without assistance.

== Interwar period ==
On 30 December 1997 Khultygov became acting director, and from 6 January 1998, director of the National Security Service, replacing Apti Batalov in this position .

During the Chechen interwar period, Khultygov repeatedly and publicly called on his colleagues to stop political intrigues and recognize Aslan Maskhadov's authority. He also positioned himself as an initiator and determined fighter against crime. He declared former armed resistance fighters involved in criminal crimes as enemies of the Chechen state and people, and was the first to admit that a number of influential field commanders and participants in the war were involved in gangs. In this struggle, Khultygov considered it possible to apply the most stringent measures. He was one of the first to put forward the idea of public shootings. The first such shooting, which took place in the center of Grozny in August 1997, caused a wide response in the Republic and abroad. The prestige of Khultygov in Ichkeria grew greatly after this event, which was primarily due to the complex criminal situation in Ichkeria at that time.

Under him, National Security Service(NSS) was purged, and he took measures to improve the professionalism of employees. In February 1998, at least two heads of departments and their deputies, four heads of departments and their deputies, and more than 20 operational employees were dismissed. In March, the resulting vacancies were filled by vertical movement of employees. Three months later, a second recertification was carried out.

In early 1998, the situation in Ichkeria worsened. Khultygov made a public statement in which he argued that their actions directly contradicted the national traditions of the Chechens. He also argued that the situation was destabilized by agents of foreign intelligence services, including from Muslim countries, such as, for example, Turkey and Pakistan, pursuing mercenary goals. At the same time, Khultygov advocated cooperation with the Russian special services. He did not limit himself to words: in December 1997, he visited Moscow, where he established contacts with the leadership of the FSB to fight crime and terrorism.

In the spring of 1998, as a result of joint actions by the NSS and the Anti-Terrorist Center, several dozen militants were detained. A number of citizens were expelled from the country. These actions provoked a sharp reaction from citizens, who subjected Khultygov to harsh criticism. A group of senior religious and government officials appealed to Maskhadov with a demand to remove Khultygov from the NSS leadership. However, the President of Ichkeria supported Khultygov's actions.

== Death ==
On 21 June 1998 a group of militants led by Vakha Dzhafarov, who belonged to Salman Raduyev, tried to seize the building of the TV center in Grozny. During the skirmish, Lecha Khultygov, Vakha Dzhafarov, and another NSS officer were shot dead. The death of Khultygov was considered a serious loss for the leadership of Ichkeria. Lecha Khultygov headed one of the most influential and formidable Chechen special forces, and was considered a "strong man" in Aslan Maskhadov's administration. Along with Khunkar-Pasha Israpilov, Khultygov was the director of the Chechen National Security Service and initiated the fight against crime during the Chechen interwar period (1997-1999). Following Lecha's death, his brother Ibragim Khultygov replaced his position as the director of the Chechen National Security Service in 1998.
