= Geliskhanov =

Geliskhanov (Russian: Гелисханов) is an Asian masculine surname, its feminine counterpart is Geliskhanova. It may refer to

- Magomed Geliskhanov (born 1986), Russian football player
- Rizvan Geliskhanov (born 1963), Soviet weightlifter of Chechen origin
- Sultan Geliskhanov, head of the state security in the Chechen Republic of Ichkeria
