= Braguny =

Village in Gudermessky District, Russia

Coordinates: 43°26′28″N 46°05′42″E

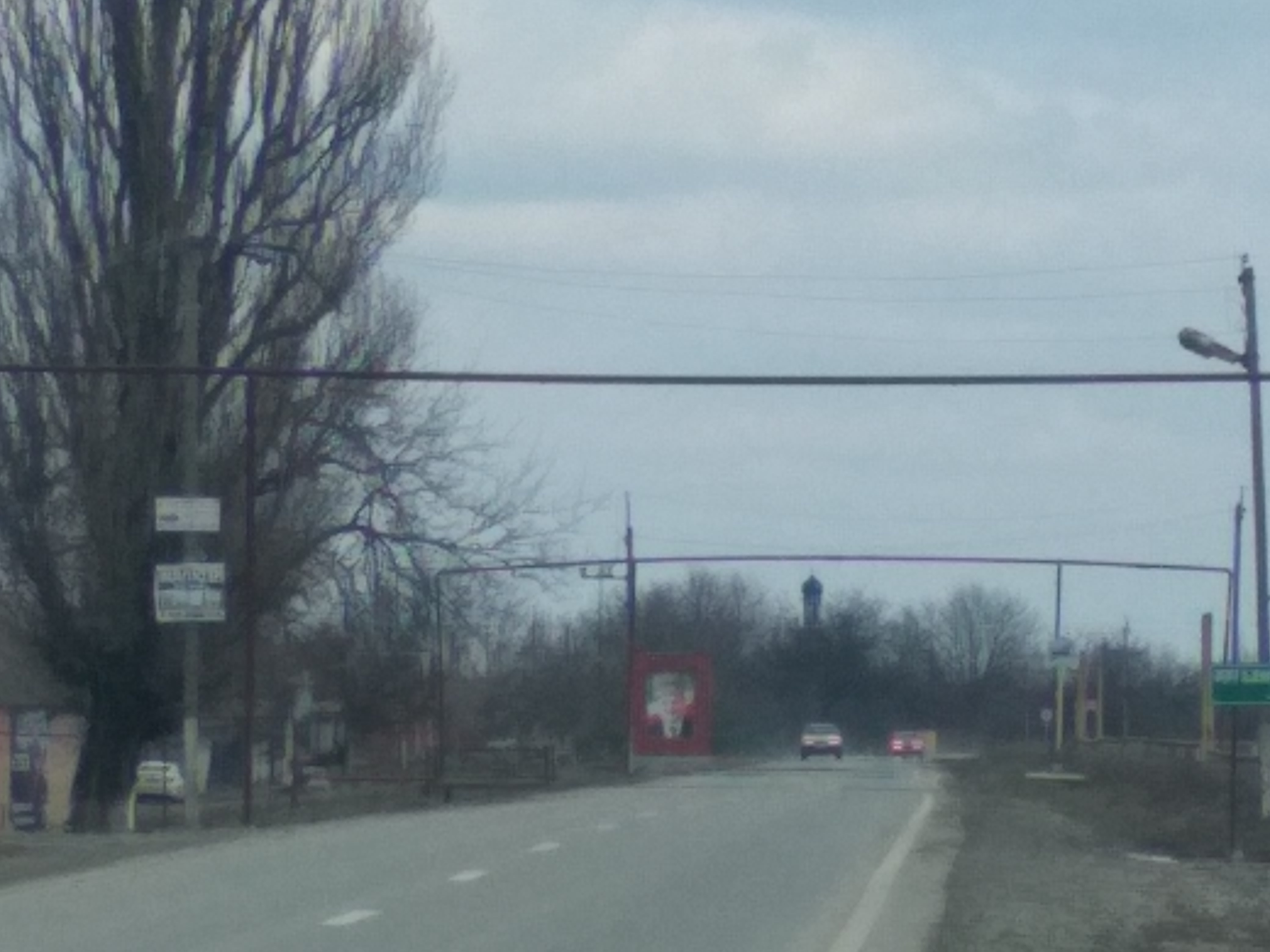
A road in Braguny.

Braguny (Russian: Брагуны, Chechen: БоргӀане, Borġane; Kumyk: Борагъан, Borağan) is a rural locality (a selo) in Gudermessky District, Chechnya.

== Administrative and municipal status ==
Municipally, Braguny is incorporated as Bragunskoye rural settlement. It is the administrative center of the municipality and is the only settlement included in it.

== Geography ==
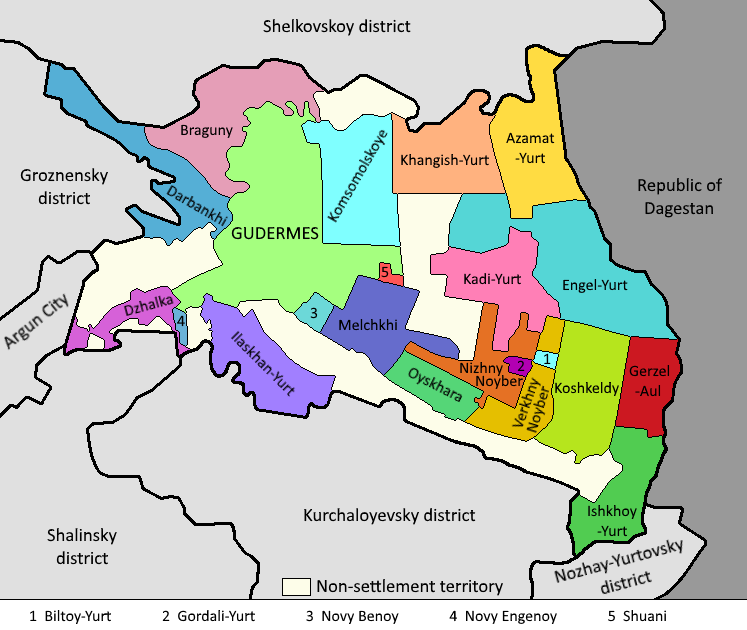
Map of Gudermessky District. Braguny is in the north-west

Braguny is located just above the confluence of the Sunzha River into the Terek River. It is located 10 kilometres (6.2 mi) north of the city of Gudermes and 46 kilometres (29 mi) north-east of the city of Grozny.

The nearest settlements to Braguny are Staro-Scherdinskaya in the north, Khangish-Yurt in the east, Solsabekan-Kotar in the south-east, the city of Gudermes in the south, and Darbankhi in the south-west.

== History ==
Turkic-Kumyk version: According to one version, the area was settled by immigrants from the Crimea, and by pre-Polovtsian Turks displaced on the right bank of the Terek River from the Boragan-Madzhara region. According to N. Semenov, Bora Khan, with Crimean people, left Crimea, when he resettled to the Caspian.

Until the 19th century, Braguny was the capital of the Kumyk feudal domain, the Principality of Braguny (Kumyk: Борагъан бийлик). The rulers of the estate, the princes Taimazovs, built their clan to the Crimean khans Gerey. Jan Potocki noted that "the princes of the Kumyks all belong to the same family as the shamkhal, excluding those from Braguny, who claim to be from Genghis Khan".

A letter from the Terek governor in Moscow in 1621 indicates that the Kumyk ruler Soltan-Magmut (Soltan-Mahmud, Soltan-Mut) arrived with eight princes, including the Bragunsky Kudeney-Murza, Batay-Murza Shikhmurzin and 38 of his brides.

In the 1848 book by Shikhaliev, “The Kumyk Story about Kumyks,” much data on the population and length of ownership was given.

In sources from the late 18th and early 19th centuries, the Bragun domination was already characterized as Kumyk, subject to the Kumyk princes: “Kumyk Aksaevskaya, Andreevskaya, Kostyukovskaya and Bragun villages”.

Authors from the early 19th century also express the idea of the prevailing influence of the Kumyk princes on Bragun land. In 1812, A. M. Butskovsky writes that it belongs to the “Kumyk clan princes: Ustarkhan Gudainatov, Adilgirey Kuchukov and Beysultan Arslanbekov, of whom the first is eldest”. S. Bronevsky in 1823 reported that Bragun’s possession “belongs to two Kumyk princes - cousins, Colonel Kuchun-Bek (Kuchuk) Taymazov and Akhtula-Bek”, but he also notes that this possession “is attributed to the Circassian regions according to the natural outline of living natural boundaries, although the Bragun inhabitants, being of Tatar origin, belong to the Kumyk branch itself”.

Johann Peter Falk, describing his journey to the Caucasus in 1773, described the population and wealth of the Braguny possessions, then already subject to Russia. Also, in the 18th century, Jacob Shtelin confirmed that "the place of the confluence of Sunzha into the Terek is owned by Prince Takmazov and his brothers". In addition to the Kumyks, Kabardians and Chechens also lived on the property.

Chechen version: According to the legend of the Bragunians themselves, the village was founded by the leader of the nomadic tribe Borahan, when, crossing in the caravan over the Sunzha River, a huge sturgeon squeezed into the spokes of the arba.

A letter from the Terek governor to Moscow in 1621 indicates the arrival at the embassy of the Kumyk ruler Soltan-Magmut (Soltan-Mahmud, Soltan-Mut) with the Mychkiz and Okotsk societies, with eight princes, including the Baragun Kuden-Murza, Batay-Murza Shikhmurzin and 38 of his brides.

== Population ==
- 1990 census: 2,376
- 2002 census: 2,896
- 2010 census: 3,304
- 2019 estimate: 3,635

According to the results of the 2010 census, the majority of residents of Braguny (3,053 or 92.40%) were ethnic Kumyks. The village is one of two Kumyk majority villages in Chechnya, the other being Vinogradnoye.

Of the other people, 242 (7.32%) were ethnic Chechens, and 9 people (0.27%) did not specify.
