= Gudermessky =

Gudermessky (masculine), Gudermesskaya (feminine), or Gudermesskoye (neuter) may refer to:

- Gudermessky District, a district of the Chechen Republic, Russia
- Gudermesskoye Urban Settlement, a municipal formation which the town of republic significance of Gudermes in the Chechen Republic, Russia is incorporated as
