= Russian hostage crisis =

Russian hostage crisis might refer to:

- Budyonnovsk hospital hostage crisis in June 1995
- Kizlyar-Pervomayskoye hostage crisis in January 1996
- Black Sea hostage crisis also in January 1996
- Moscow theater hostage crisis in October 2002
- Beslan school hostage crisis in September 2004
