= Darbankhi =

Village in Gudermessky District, Russia

Coordinates: 43°23′51″N 46°01′55″E

Darbankhi (Russian: Дарбанхи, Chechen: Дарбанхи, Darbanxi; Kumyk: Янгы Борагъан, Yañı Borağan) is a rural locality (a selo) in Gudermessky District, Chechnya.

== Administrative and municipal status ==
Municipally, Darbankhi is incorporated as Darbankhinskoye rural settlement. It is the administrative center of the municipality and is the only settlement included in it.

== Geography ==
Map of Gudermessky District with Darbankhi highlighted

Darbankhi is located at the interfluve of the Sunzha and Terek rivers. It is 4 kilometres (2.5 mi) north-west of the city of Gudermes and 40 kilometres (25 mi) north-east of the city of Grozny.

The nearest settlements to Darbankhi are the city of Gudermes in the south-east, Ilinovskaya in the south-west, Vinogradnoye in the north-west, Chervlennaya-Uzolvaya in the north, and Braguny in the north-east.

== Name ==
The name Darbankhi comes from the Chechen language and translates roughly as "healing water".

== History ==
The village of Darbankhi was once called Istisu-Khutor.

In 1944, after the genocide and deportation of the Chechen and Ingush people and the Chechen-Ingush ASSR was abolished, the village of Istisu-Khutor was renamed, and settled by people from the neighbouring republic of Dagestan and other regions. From 1944 to 1957, it was a part of the Gudermessky District of Grozny Oblast.

In 1957, when the Vaynakh people returned and the Chechen-Ingush ASSR was restored, the village regained its old name, Istisu-Khutor.

In 1977, by a decree of the Presidium of the Armed Forces of the RSFSR, the village at the railway crossing of Braguny, was renamed from Istisu-Khutor and was given its modern name, Darbankhi.

== Population ==
- 1990 Census: 1,713
- 2002 Census: 1,683
- 2010 Census: 2,101
- 2019 estimate: 2,329

According to the results of the 2010 Census, the majority of residents of Darbankhi (1,080 or 51.4%) were ethnic Chechens, 1,005 (47,8%) were ethnic Kumyks, and 16 people (0,8%) did not specify.

== Education ==
The village hosts one secondary school.

== Healthcare ==
There is one psychiatric hospital in the village.
