= Guerrilla phase of the Second Chechen War (2000) =

Part of a Russian war in the Caucasus

== Timeline ==
Russian troops averaged a loss of 200 men per month.

=== May ===
- May 11 - Eighteen Russian army soldiers were killed, three wounded and one missing in an automatic weapons attack on a convoy near the village of Galashki in Ingushetia.
- May 27 - Four servicemen from the Russian Interior Ministry were killed in Chechnya's Nozhay-Yurtovsky District when a convoy of federal forces came under a rebel attack.
- May 28 - Three Chechen policemen were killed and three were injured in a bomb and automatic weapons attack on a UAZ car.
- May 31 - Sergei Zveryev, Russia's second highest-ranking official in Chechnya, was killed by a remote-controlled bomb in the Chechen capital Grozny. The city councillour Supyan Makhchayev, who was with Zveryev, was injured in the bombing, while his assistant was killed.

=== June ===
- June 5 - Four Chechen guerrillas were killed during a military operation in the Shalinsky District of Chechnya.
- June 6 - Two female suicide bombers, including the cousin of Arbi Barayev, detonated a truck bomb at a Russian commander's headquarters in Alkhan-Yurt, killing 2 soldiers as the Russian police and special forces units have begun a large-scale security operation in Grozny. Meanwhile, Ilyas Akhmadov, Chechnya's unrecognised foreign minister, announced in Washington that the separatists want to end "this useless war" with Russia. The commander of VDV Georgy Shpak responded with a statement that the estimated 2,500 active insurgent fighters should be not presented an offer to capitulate but "exterminated" at any cost.
- June 11 - Suicide attack by the former Russian soldier who converted to Islam in the captivity kills two OMON troops at the security checkpoint.
- June 12 - Rebel forces in Grozny succeeded in planting explosives in an army vehicle without the knowledge of the Russian soldier who drove it. The vehicle blew up at an army position. Russian agencies reported the deaths of two policemen, while the foreign Mujahideen’s official news agency al-Qoqaz reported the deaths of 27 Russian elite soldiers.
- June 16 - Eight Russian soldiers were killed during a Chechen attack on their column in the Kirov settlement, western Grozny. Two Chechen police officers working for Russian authorities were found beheaded.
- June 20 - One Russian serviceman was killed and two officers were wounded during a rebel attack on a federal police station in Grozny.
- June 27 - Two days of fighting left 12 Russians dead and up to 60 rebels killed according to Russian military
- June 30 - Nine Russian soldiers were killed and seven were wounded when their vehicle detonated a land mine on the outskirts of the village of Avtury, Shalinsky District.

=== July ===
- July 2 - Nine Russian soldiers were killed and seven others wounded in a landmine explosion near Chechnya's village of Avtury, Russian presidential aide on Chechnya Sergey Yastrzhembsky told reporters. He also denied media reports that about 40-50 federal soldiers were killed in the five-day battle near Serzhen-Yurt, saying the federal force has lost only 13 killed and 18 wounded. Gen. Gennady Troshev said that over 100 rebels were killed.
- July 2-July 3 - Chechen insurgents launched five suicide bomb attacks into Russian military and police headquarters and barracks within 24 hours, killing or injuring more than 150 people, including 26 OMON troops killed and 81 wounded.
- July 8 - At least six Russian soldiers died during clashes with Chechen guerrillas near the villages of Borzoy and Khalkeloy, in Argun gorge.
- July 15 - Chechen rebels attacked the Khankala base housing the Russian military headquarters outside Grozny.
- July 18 - Reports said 18 Russian soldiers and two guerrillas perished following an ambush near the village of Zhani-Vedeno. Guerrilla leader Nasruddin Bazhiyev surrendered to security forces in Chechnya.
- July 19 - Seven Russian soldiers were killed in four machine gun, IED and ambush attacks in Chechnya.
- July 21 - Four Russian soldiers were killed when a land mine blew up their truck in the Shalinsky District of Chechnya.
- July 24 - At least two members of the Russian forces were killed and 34 were injured when their vehicles were attacked with two land mines in Grozny.
- "Chechen fighters killed five Russian policemen and injured another three during a fire fight in Argun, while a daylight ambush on truck convoy killed several soldiers in Grozny". Milwaukee Journal Sentinel. July 25, 2000.
- July 29 - A Russian Spetznaz sniper sniper killed Dalkhan Khozhayev, deputy senior commander to military Chechen leader Ruslan Gelayev, in the village of Kulary.

=== August ===
- August 4 - Russia reported that Chechen fighters had decapitated two Russian army colonels, who had been seized earlier in the Vedensky District.
- August 7 - The Russian government announced the defection of Ibragim Khultygov, a former counter-intelligence chief for the separatist government in Chechnya.
- August 10 - Five Chechen fighters and two Russian soldiers died during a fire fight in the mountains south of the village of Verkhny Alkun near the border with Ingushetia.
- August 13 - Six IED explosions in Dagestan killed seven Russian soldiers, including two female intelligence officers, and injured 15 others. A Russian police station and Russian train in Khasavyurt were the targets for two of the bombs.
- August 18 - Chechen fighters killed eight Russian soldiers in several attacks on checkpoints and roadblocks.
- August 26 - A radio-controlled mine exploded in the southern outskirts of Bachi-Yurt killed seven Russian soldiers. Another booby trap near blast near Zhani-Vedeno left two Russian servicemen dead and three others wounded.

=== September ===
- September 7 - Four Russian soldiers were killed in a rebel ambush in Grozny.
- September 17 - Chechen fighters assassinated Col. Shamil Azayev, deputy chief of police in Vedeno.
- September 20 - Nineteen Russian soldiers, including 13 from the Defence Ministry and six from the Interior Ministry perished in several operations in Chechnya died, as did at least two chechen fighters including an Arab.
- September 30 - Eleven Russian soldiers died and another 13 suffered wounds in two clashed with guerrillas in the Minutka Square and the Zavodskoy district in Grozny.

=== October ===
- October 6 - Russia said approximately 150 fighters surrendered to authorities along with their commander Vakhid Shakarov.
- October 7 - Russia said its troops killed chechen commander Baudin Bakuyev in the Shatoysky District while five Russian soldiers perished in a clash with the rebels in Avtorkhanovsky City District of Grozny.
- October 8 - The ambush a UAZ patrol vehicle killed two russian policemen and injured three in Ingushetia.
- October 9 - Three Russian soldiers were ambushed and killed in Urus-Martan.
- October 11 - Six Russian servicemen were killed and 10 wounded in an ambush in the town of Dzhani-Vedeno and a mine attack on a truck near the village of Beloreche. Meanwhile the Russian air force hit rebel positions in the southern mountains.
- October 12 - A powerful car bomb went off outside Oktyabrsky city district police station in the capital Grozny, killing at least 15, including prosecutors, and wounding 22 people.
- October 17 - Mines planted by Chechen rebels killed four Russian soldiers.
- October 24 - Insurgents killed at least 13 Russian soldiers and wounding 24 in three separate attacks using mine-and-gun ambushed in Grozny and two in smaller towns, an official in the pro-Moscow's administration said.
- October 29 - A bomb blast in a Café Elita in the village of Chiri-Yurt killed at least eight people, including at least seven Russian soldiers; five other servicemen were wounded in the explosion while three people were wounded when a radio-controlled mine went off at a Russian military checkpoint in Grozny, the Russian military reported.

=== November ===
- November 1 - Chechen fighters killed 14 Russian soldiers in a series of raids.
- November 1 - According to the Russian sources, Chechen President Aslan Maskhadov had been wounded and Maskhadov's driver and two members of his escort were killed in a shooting near the settlement of Alleroy.
- November 11 - Russian general Gennady Troshev told a television audience that 31 Russian troops were killed in recent heavy fighting with chechen and foreign fighters; Troshev said the fighting was in the Argun gorge south of Grozny, and that the Russian soldiers were outnumbered when counter-attacked by 1,000 Chechen and foreign fighters. An earlier Chechen ambush killed 20 Russian soldiers.
- November 19 - Seven Russian soldiers were killed and 10 wounded in several attacks by Chechen rebels.
- November 23 - Four Russian soldiers were killed and 18 wounded in a series of Chechen rebel attacks.
- November 26 - Chechen fighters killed a colonel and one other Russian soldier in Sernovodsk near the border with Ingushetia, while two policemen died in an explosion in Gudermes.
- November 27 - Grozny's central market was entirely destroyed by Russian armored vehicles the first day of the Muslim holy month of Ramadan. Pro-Moscow Chechen said that in November alone, 18 Russian soldiers were killed in or disappeared from the market.

=== December ===
- December 9 - Two car bombs killed 21 and wounded over 50 civilians leaving the mosque in the village of Alkhan-Yurt, with the separatists and federal authorities blaming each other for the atrocity; the Russian command indicated Arbi Barayev indicated in ordering the attacks. Russian military said a firefight and a mine blast left at least seven Russian servicemen dead and eight wounded, while its forces detained more than 50 persons and discovered an arms depot.
- December 10 - Alkhan-Kala administration deputy head Zura Koliyeva and her husband discovered gunned down in the village. A car bomb in Grozny misses the Chechen head of the RAO UES Nurdin Usamov.
- December 12 - A bodyguard of Akhmad Kadyrov, the leader of the pro-Russian government in Chechnya, shot dead in the village of Bachi-Yurt; Chechen fighters said that they had assassinated the head of the Kadyrov's bodyguard. Interior Ministry said federal forces in Chechnya have destroyed 58 illegal refineries which funded militants and arrested a number of Chechen policemen suspected of aiding them.
- December 13 - Rebels claim having killed at least 34 soldiers, including at least 17 in a surprise attack on the Russian command building in Shali and 17 in two other attacks. Two decapitated bodies discovered by local residents in the Achkhoy-Martanovsky District of Chechnya. Russia said two soldiers, Khorolya and Serotetto captured on December 2 near Vladikavkaz in North Ossetia, have been released in Chechnya as a result of a special operation. Four army servicemen were detained in Dagestan for illegal trafficking of firearms and ammunition.
- December 14 - The bodies of eight chechen civilians bearing evidence of having been tortured and executed (gunshot wounds) with their hands tied were discovered near the Chechen village of Mesker-Yurt; local residents recognised them as the men who had disappeared after the mopping-up operation in the village of Germenchuk. Russian law enforcement agencies have found over 16,000 stolen cars in Chechnya in 2000, spokesman said.
- December 15 - Two killed when a military prosecutor's car was blown up by a land mine, the internal affairs department said. The Russian Interior Ministry command paraded to reporters four federal servicemen Sudnev, Kartapolov, Terentyev and Igoshev, who they said were released from Chechen captivity.
- December 17 - Two Chechen policemen were killed along with two rebel fighters during a guerrilla attack on city hall in Grozny, local law enforcement officials said; in a separate incident, a Russian soldier was killed and two others wounded in a rebel grenade attack in the city. Grozny mayor Bislan Gantamirov commented that the capital "is full of rebels" who have a relative freedom of action. The Chechen separatist Supreme Shura has declared war on the Chechen Republic's oil industry, issuing an order that impels Chechens "to blast and set on fire all trains carrying oil and petroleum products" and "to destroy railways and bridges through which fuel is transported."
- December 18 - Shirvani Basayev, the brother of rebel leader Shamil Basayev, died of wounds, Putin's spokesman said; Chechen Kavkaz Center website denied this. Three bodies of federal servicemen were found near a Russian checkpoint on the Ingush side of the border with Chechnya. Georgian President Eduard Shevardnadze for the first time admitted that there are Chechen combatants in the Pankisi Gorge. Five Russian servicemen detained after firing on civilian vehicles the Kavkaz federal highway in Chechnya in which a bus driver was shot and killed.
- December 19 - Russian Presidential aide Sergey Yastrzhembsky said he rules out the possibility of direct or mediated negotiations with Chechen separatists; in particular, rejected was the mediation offer by the Russian tycoon Boris Berezovsky. Lieutenant General Vladimir Bulgakov has refused to replace Lt. Gen. Valery Baranov as the head the joint federal group in Chechnya. Two captured Chechen fighters, Ramzes Gaichayev and Rustam Khalidov, are tried by the Russian court in Pyatigorsk for "genocide". Three employees of the Georgian Rustavi 2 TV were detained for several hours by armed Chechens in Pankisi. In the Russian opinion poll, 50% of respondents answered that the military operations in Chechnya will not fully stop in 2001, while 29% were sure that the military operations will never stop.
- December 29 - 14 Russian soldiers were killed in heavy fighting in Chechnya.
