= Khunkar-Pasha Israpilov =

Chechen separatist (1967–2000)

Khunkar-pasha Germanovich Israpilov
- German-voj Xunkarpaş
- Born: 13 November 1967; Alleroy, Chechnya, North Caucasia
- Died: 1 February 2000 (aged 32); Grozny, Chechnya, North Caucasia
- Military career
- Allegiance: Confederation of Mountain Peoples of the Caucasus; Chechen Republic of Ichkeria
- Service years: 1984–2000
- Rank: Brigadier General
- Commands: Army
- Conflicts: Georgian-Abkhazian conflict; First Chechen War; Second Chechen War; Battle of Grozny

Khunkar-pasha Germanovich Israpilov (Chechen: German-voj Xunkarpaş, 13 November 1967 – 1 February 2000) was a Chechen separatist commander and an active participant of both the First and Second Chechen Wars. Khunkar-Pasha is from the Alaroy Teip (Uta-Bukhoy branch).

Israpilov took part in both the Budyonnovsk hospital hostage crisis and the Kizlyar-Pervomayskoye hostage crisis, and he was hit by a mine when leaving the encircled Grozny.
