= Turpal-Ali Atgeriyev =

Chechen brigadier general and politician (1969–2002)

Turpal-Ali Aladiyevich Atgeriyev
- Born: 8 May 1969; Alleroy, Checheno-Ingush ASSR, Russian SFSR, USSR
- Died: 18 August 2002 (aged 33); Yekaterinburg, Russia
- Military career
- Allegiance: Confederation of Mountain Peoples of the Caucasus; Chechen Republic of Ichkeria
- Service years: 1992–2002
- Rank: Brigadier General
- Conflicts: War in Abkhazia (1992–1993); First Chechen War; Battle of Grozny (1994–95); Kizlyar-Pervomayskoye hostage crisis

Turpal-Ali Aladiyevich Atgeriyev (8 May 1969 – 18 August 2002) was a deputy prime minister, national security minister of Chechnya.

== Biography ==
Atgeriev was a former Soviet traffic police officer and a veteran of the Georgian-Abkhazian War. During the First Chechen War he coordinated all units during the battles of Grozny and served as a field commander of the Shelkovsky District of Chechnya, including taking part in the 1996 Kizlyar-Pervomayskoye hostage crisis in Dagestan. Later, he became a Deputy Prime Minister in the government of the Chechen President Aslan Maskhadov.

In July 1999, while trying to engage in talks with the Russian side, Atgeriev was briefly arrested at Moscow's Vnukovo airport together with Chechen Deputy Prosecutor-General Adam Torkhashev and two officials from the Moscow office of the Chechen Interior Ministry. He has twice told Russian media that he alerted the then Federal Security Service of the Russian Federation (FSB) Director Vladimir Putin in the summer of 1999 to the imminent incursion into Dagestan. Atgeriev did not take active part in the Second Chechen War (at this time, he had no armed men under his command besides his personal bodyguards). Nevertheless, he was falsely implicated in the scandalous prisoner swap of Andrei Babitsky, a Russian journalist kidnapped by the Russian military.

Atgeriev, whom Nezavisimaya Gazeta termed "the last remaining member of the Chechen leadership who is unequivocally loyal to President Aslan Maskhadov," was captured in October 2000 and sentenced to 15 years in prison. On 18 August 2002, while serving the sentence in Yekaterinburg prison, Atgeriev mysteriously died from "internal bleeding" that was attributed to leukemia. The Chechen Deputy Premier Akhmed Zakayev accused the Russian authorities of murdering Atgeriev. His relatives claimed he was tortured to death. The case was highlighted in the open letter by Memorial to Putin.
