= Engel-Yurt =

Village in Gudermessky District, Chechen Republic, Russia

Coordinates: 43°19′37″N 46°21′14″E

Engel-Yurt (Russian: Энгель-Юрт, romanized: Engel'-Yurt, Chechen: Энгал-Юрт, romanized: Engal-Yurt,) is a rural locality (a selo) in Gudermessky District, Chechnya.

== Administrative and municipal status ==
Municipally, Engel-Yurt is incorporated as Engel-Yurtovskoye rural settlement. It is the administrative center of the municipality and is the only settlement included in it.

== Geography ==
Map of Gudermessky District with Engel-Yurt highlighted

Engel-Yurt is located on the left bank of the Aksai River, not far from the border with Dagestan. It is 24 kilometres (15 mi) east of the city of Gudermes and 60 kilometres (37 mi) north-east of the city of Grozny.

The nearest settlements to Engel-Yurt are Khangish-Yurt and Azamat-Yurt in the north-west, Karasuv-Otar in the north, Aksai in the north-east, Razak-Otar in the east, Gerzel-Aul in the south-east, and Kadi-Yurt and Biltoy-Yurt in the south-west.

== History ==
Engel-Yurt was founded in 1770.

In 1944, after the genocide and deportation of the Chechen and Ingush people and the Chechen-Ingush ASSR was abolished, the village of Engel-Yurt was renamed, and was settled by people from the neighbouring republic of Dagestan. From 1944 to 1957, it was a part of the Dagestan ASSR.

In 1957, when the Vaynakh people returned and the Chechen-Ingush ASSR was restored, the village regained its old name, Engel-Yurt.

== Population ==
- 1990 Census: 4,011
- 2002 Census: 5,496
- 2010 Census: 4,458
- 2020 estimate: 5,856

According to the results of the 2010 Census, the majority of residents of Engel-Yurt were ethnic Chechens.

== Teips ==
Residents of Engel-Yurt come from the following teips:

- Aitkhalloy
- Engenoy
- Kurchaloy
- Biltoy
- Zandakoy
- Shonoy

== Education ==
Engel-Yurt hosts two secondary schools.
