= Salman Raduyev =

Chechen military commander

- Салма́н Раду́ев
- Born: 13 February 1967; Novogroznensky, Soviet Union
- Died: 14 December 2002 (aged 35); Solikamsk, Russia
- Military career
- Allegiance: ChRI armed forces (1992–1997); General Dudayev's Army (1997–2000)
- Rank: Brigadier General (1995–1997) (Reduced to private)
- Nickname: Borz
- Unit: 6th Brigade (Gudermessky District)
- Conflicts: First Nagorno-Karabakh War; First Chechen War (Kizlyar raid); Second Chechen War

Salman Betyrovich Raduyev (or Raduev; Russian: Салма́н Бетырович Раду́ев; 13 February 1967 – 14 December 2002) was a Chechen militant and separatist field commander, from 1994 to 1999, who masterminded and was responsible for the Kizlyar hostage taking raid. His activities, in his role as a commander, made him "Russia's second most wanted man."

Georgi Derluguian also called him "the enfant terrible" of Chechen resistance due to his eccentric behavior outside his military career: he wore a uniform decorated by what he claimed to be the insignia of Genghis Khan, a black military beret like that of Saddam Hussein, an Arab keffiyeh around his neck and aviator sunglasses to hide his face which had been heavily reconstructed after multiple surgeries due to the injuries he sustained as a militant.

Radyev was arrested in 2000 and died in the Russian penal colony White Swan in 2002, under mysterious circumstances.

== Early life ==
Raduyev was born in 1967 into the Gordaloy teip in Novogroznensky near Gudermes in eastern Chechnya.

During the early 1980s, Raduyev was active in the communist youth league Komsomol of which he eventually became a leader. After attending a high school in Gudermes, Raduyev served from 1985 to 1987 as a construction engineer in a Russian Strategic Rocket Forces unit stationed in the Byelorussian Soviet Socialist Republic, where he became a member of the Communist Party of the Soviet Union.

After demobilization, he studied economics and worked in the Soviet construction industry.

Like other Chechens who sought Islamic education in Central Asia in the early 90s, Raduyev also got a grounding in the Islamic sciences, having studied at a madrasa in Namangan, in Uzbekistan.

After Chechnya declared independence, he was appointed the prefect of Gudermes in June 1992 by his father-in-law, Dzhokhar Dudayev, who was the president of the Chechen Republic of Ichkeria. He also married Dudayev's niece.

== Early military career ==
During the First Chechen War, Raduyev became a field commander for the separatist Chechen forces. He fought in the battle of Grozny and was wounded in March 1995 during an attempt to capture him by the Russian special forces.

In October 1995, he led the 6th Brigade based in the strategically important Gudermessky District and was responsible for the Gudermessky, part of the capital Grozny and the town of Argun.

On 14 December 1995, Raduyev, along with Sultan Geliskhanov, led a raid on the city of Gudermes.

On 9 January 1996, Raduyev (allegedly copying Shamil Basayev's 1995 Budyonnovsk attack in Chechnya) led a large-scale Kizlyar hostage-taking raid in the neighboring Russian region of Dagestan, where his men took at least 2,000 civilians hostage. The raid, which made Raduyev world-famous, escalated into an all-out battle that ended with the complete destruction of the border village of Pervomayskoye, and led to other Chechen leaders criticizing the attack.

In March 1996, a sniper shot Raduyev in the head, but he survived despite being incorrectly reported dead; Russian special forces claimed to have killed him in revenge for the Kizlyar attack, while other sources said he was shot in a Chechen feud. On 7 March 63 out of 101 deputies of the Parliament of Estonia sent condolences to Dudayev expressing "deep sympathy with the Chechen people" on "the loss of commander Raduyev", sparking a row with the Russian Duma. Raduyev went for medical treatment abroad.

== Later military career ==
In the summer of 1996, Raduyev returned to the republic and refused the orders of Chechnya's acting president, Zelimkhan Yandarbiyev, to stop carrying out terrorist operations (such as ordering bombings of trolleybuses in Moscow and train stations in Armavir and Pyatigorsk), in light of the ceasefire and talks that would lead up to the Khasav-Yurt Accord. Raduyev even accused Yandarbiyev of treason for agreeing to a ceasefire and threatened to attack him.

Raduyev, whose face was deformed due to injuries, and now hidden behind the bushy red beard and black sunglasses, was the only field commander to announce openly that the "war without rules" with Russia would continue despite the signing of the peace agreement.

In 1997, the newly elected Chechen president Aslan Maskhadov stripped Raduyev of the rank of brigadier general and demoted him to private. However, further action was blocked by opposition from Raduyev-led war veterans, including a prolonged rally in Grozny. This rally ended in a shootout, resulting in the deaths of both the commander of Raduyev's militia, Vakha Dzhafarov, and of the Chechen security forces chief Lechi Khultygov. Meanwhile, Raduyev kept claiming responsibility for every explosion in Russia, even including accidental gas leaks. He claimed that Dudayev, who had died in 1996, was still alive and issuing orders to him from "a secret NATO base in Turkey" with the goal of the "liberation" of the entire North Caucasus.

Raduyev's eccentric behavior, however, was not widely popular in Chechnya. Many openly doubted his sanity: in an interview in 1997, Maskhadov described Raduyev as "mentally ill". Even Basayev, who has been Raduyev's ally in the opposition against Maskhadov, reportedly called him "crazy". In October 1997, Raduyev was again severely injured by a car bomb which killed three other people. Previously, he had survived at least two other assassination attempts in April and July 1997.

In September 1998, Raduyev announced a "temporary moratorium" on acts of terrorism. Raduyev claimed he had freed nine kidnapped Russian servicemen from their captors. He also came into conflict within Islamist circles and called for a ban of "Wahhabism" in Chechnya. On 4 November 1998, Chechnya's Islamic court sentenced Raduyev in absence to four years in prison for allegedly attempting to overthrow Maskhadov, but made no attempt to arrest him.

In January 1999, he backed the republic's parliament in its conflict with the Sharia Court. His private army-style militia, some 1,000-strong and called "General Dudayev's Army", was reportedly involved in several train robberies.

In early 1999, Raduyev vanished from the public again while undergoing a major plastic surgery operation in Germany. The alleged implants of titanium earned him the nickname of "Titanic" in Russia, while in Chechnya he became popularly known as "Michael Jackson", a reference to his plastic surgery. Still seriously ill and recovering from surgery, Raduyev vowed "reprisals" against Russia for the March 1999 sentencing of two Chechen women.

In September 1999, at the start of the Second Chechen War, Raduyev organized a rally in Grozny attended by 12,000 people where he urged residents to stay home and prepare to defend the city. His militia was reported to be virtually destroyed by a series of serious setbacks during the early fighting in late 1999, and he stopped talking about planning and organizing new attacks afterward.

== Arrest and trial ==
Raduyev was captured in March 2000 by the Russian special operations FSB unit Vympel in his home in Novogroznensky (now Oyskhara, near Gudermes). During the second war Raduyev was very ill and had to go for treatment abroad, so he shaved his beard and moved to a house near the border in preparation for the exit. However, one of his men informed the Russian forces about his location and he was arrested without incident. Russian president Vladimir Putin said that Raduyev had confessed to trying to assassinate Eduard Shevardnadze, the president of Georgia.

Raduyev was tried on 18 different charges, including terrorism, banditry, hostage-taking, organization of murders and organization of illegal armed formations. He pleaded not guilty, maintained he was only following orders, claimed to suffer from no mental disorders, and said he hoped to be released from prison in some 10–12 years. Dozens of witnesses were called to testify, but many of the alleged victims of his actions refused to participate. In December 2001, he was sentenced to life in prison. His appeal was rejected by the Supreme Court of the Russian Federation in April 2002.

== Death ==
In December 2002, Raduyev died in the White Swan penal colony in Solikamsk from internal bleeding. The Russian authorities said he was not beaten to death, but died due to "serious and protracted diseases". Raduyev's body was not returned to his family because of a newly introduced Russian law barring the release of bodies of people convicted (or accused) of terrorism.

The circumstances surrounding the death of Raduyev are not clear, and according to his family and others he was murdered in prison after he refused to talk about the accusations against Akhmed Zakayev, then arrested in Denmark. Kommersant daily said that "the real reason for Raduyev's death will probably never be known", while Vremya Novostei suggested that after being forced to give all the information requested from him, he was "no longer needed" by the Russian authorities and killed. Amnesty International has called for a full investigation into the circumstances surrounding his death but the request was ignored and his body was not exhumed.

Salman Raduyev left a wife and two sons – Johar and Zelimhan – who are living abroad.

== See also ==
- Adam Delimkhanov – Raduyev's driver, who later became a Russian State Duma deputy and de facto deputy leader of Chechnya under Ramzan Kadyrov.
