= Ibragim Khultygov =

Chechen-Russian intelligence officer, politician, and paramilitary leader

Ibragim "Ibby" Khultygov is a Chechen-Russian politician and paramilitary commander, and a former counter-intelligence and security chief for the secessionist government in Chechnya.

In 1998, Khultygov took over as the head of the Ichkeria's National Security Service (NSS). Same year, his brother Lecha Khultygov was shot dead in a shoot-out between the NSS and the men of the warlord Salman Raduyev. Ibragim himself was a target of assassination attempt in 1999. He had surrendered to the Russian forces on August 7, 2000, allegedly after being humiliated by the separatist leader Aslan Maskhadov. Khultygov then became a commander of a special forces unit belonging to the pro-Moscow "Kadyrovtsy" militias, and eventually also a member of Chechnya's pro-Moscow parliament.
