= Aslambek Abdulkhadzhiev =

Chechen brigadier general (1962–2002)

- Born: 12 April 1962; Germenchuk, Checheno-Ingush ASSR, Russian SFSR, USSR
- Died: 26 August 2002 (aged 40); Shali, Chechnya, North Caucasus
- Military career
- Allegiance: Confederation of Mountain Peoples of the Caucasus; Chechen Republic of Ichkeria
- Branch: Chechen National Guard
- Service years: 1991–2002
- Rank: Brigadier General
- Nickname: Big Aslambek
- Conflicts: War in Abkhazia (1992–1993); First Chechen War; Second Chechen War

Aslambek Saypiyevich Abdulkhadzhiev (12 April 1962 – 26 August 2002) was a brigadier general in the Armed Forces of the Chechen Republic of Ichkeria. He was a deputy of Shamil Basayev, and commissioner of Shalinsky and Vedensky Districts after being appointed by Dzhokhar Dudayev in 1994. He participated in the War of Abkhazia as well as in both Russian-Chechen wars.

== Role in First Chechen War ==
Abdulkhadzhiev took part in the Basayev led Budyonnovsk hospital hostage crisis in June 1995. Shamil's fighters seized the Budyonnovsk hospital and the 1,600 people inside for a period of several days. At least 147 civilians died and 415 were wounded. They then successfully retreated to Chechnya under cover of hostages.

In a Prism (a Jamestown Foundation monthly) interview, Abdulkhadzhiev gave his opinion of the Budyonnovsk tragedy:

AA: Here I must say we do not plan anything like Budennovsk. The Budennovsk tragedy will never be repeated. Moreover, we did not make these plans except as a last resort. Why was the world was silent when Shali was bombed, when some 400 people were killed or wounded? In fact, the evil we did in Budennovsk was not even 30 percent of what they did in Shali. And what was world community's reaction when they wiped out Samashki and Serzhen-Yurt?

Prism: You are saying Budennovsk will never be repeated. Then what will happen?

AA: I want peace. Budennovsk is the way for all small people to save themselves. Today it is possible to have all the might of a big state turned against this state. Therefore, this war is senseless and it must be stopped no matter how much certain politicians would wish it to continue.

== Death ==
Despite being wanted by Russian authorities, Abdulkhadzhiev continued to be a significant force of influence in southern Chechnya until he was killed on 26 August 2002 in Shali by Russian Spetsnaz who attempted to capture him.
