= Sultan Geliskhanov =

Chechen intelligence agent and military commander

Sultan Geliskhanov (Султан Гелисханов) is a former head of the state security service in the Chechen Republic of Ichkeria and a former field commander in the Chechen resistance against Russia.

== Biography ==
=== Early life ===
Sultan Geliskhanov was born in 1955 in internal exile in Kazakhstan. According to the other sources he belongs to the Yalxoroj (Ялхорой) teip (clan) and is originally from the village of Yalxoroj which is named after this teip.

During the Soviet period Geliskhanov served as chief of the traffic police in Gudermes, Chechnya's second-largest city, reaching the rank of colonel.

=== Chechen security service ===
Following the dissolution of the Soviet Union and Chechnya's declaration of independence, after Geliskhanov lost in elections to the post of mayor of Gudermes 1992, in 1993 Dzhokhar Dudayev made him Chechen minister of internal affairs and then director of the State Security Department DGB (ДГБ) later the same year. His rise was made possible by his friendship with Dudayev's son-in-law, Salman Raduyev.

In June 1993, Geliskhanov ordered disarmament of all "illegal armed formations" and banned civilians from bearing arms in public (a right given to the people by Dudayev earlier). He then personally led the breaking up of an opposition rally in central Grozny, during which some 15 people were killed; a year later, he directed large-scale arrests of opposition members. Geliskhanov's DGB successes included the arrest the Chechen mafia boss Nikolay Suleimanov and the capture of two high-ranking officers of the Russian Federal Counterintelligence Service (FSK, at the time the main successor agency to the KGB) clandestinely deployed to Chechnya. Ruslan Labazanov, opposition co-leader, crime kingpin and renegade former head of Dudayev's bodyguards, publicly swore to kill "especially Dudayev and Geliskhanov."

There were rumours Geliskhanov told the FSK that he has two battalions ready to confront Dudayev, but he denied having said that. He also accused the FSK of spending billion of dollars on terrorism, sabotage, propaganda, disinformation and other subversive actions aimed at toppling the Chechen government.

=== First war with Russia ===
At the beginning of the First Chechen War of 1994–1996, Geliskhanov took part in the Battle of Grozny. The DGB unit under his personal command fled their post after being bombed and without notifying the HQ, which allowed a Russian infantry force to cross Voikov bridge across the Sunzha River and approach the City Hospital No.2 (the command center after the evacuation of the Presidential Palace), eventually forcing the Chechen command to abandon it.

Having abandoned his official post of the Chechen security minister after he had fled from besieged Chechen capital in late January 1995, Geliskhanov engaged in negotiations regarding his surrender, but demanded guarantees of safety. On March 14, 1995, however, the acting Russian federal prosecutor of the Chechen Republic Baskhanov signed an order to initiate criminal proceedings against him along with Zelimkhan Yandarbiyev, Shamil Basayev and other Chechen leaders.

Geliskhanov then became a guerrilla leader, gaining reputation as one of the top separatist field commanders. According to Human Rights Watch, Ishkoy-Yurt, a village located directly across the border with Dagestan, was reportedly "marked for special retribution" by Russian troops on April 20 because it was the home of Geliskhanov, "a leading Dudayev loyalist". In April–May there were false rumours that he has been "liquidated" by a covert FSK assassination squad.

In 1995, along with Raduyev, Geliskhanov commanded an attack on a convoy of the Russian Interior Ministry, and on December 14 the pair led a large-scale guerrilla raid on Gudermes, seizing much of the city for three days. He also participated in negotiations with federal representatives during the Budyonnovsk hospital hostage crisis in the role of neutral mediator.

=== After the war ===
After the end of the first war, and following Aslan Maskhadov's election as President of Ichkeria in January 1997, Geliskhanov again joined up with Raduyev, an opponent of Maskhadov who has raised an unruly 1,000-strong militia known as General Dudayev's Army, based in downtown Grozny and partially controlling the Gudermessky District of eastern Chechnya. Geliskhanov's Squad, his group of about 100 armed men, was based in the remote Nozhay-Yurtovsky District to the south of Gudermessky.

=== Second war with Russia ===
When the Second Chechen War began in 1999, his men reportedly dispersed and there were reports that he had died. In April 2002, pro-Moscow President of the Chechen Republic Akhmad Kadyrov claimed that Geliskhanov and more than 100 of his fighters planned to give up soon, but this did not take place.

=== Surrender ===
On March 28–29, 2006, regnum.ru and kavkaz.memo.ru reported that Sultan Geliskhanov and his brother Turpal voluntarily surrendered in Gudermes to the pro-Moscow Chechen authorities. According to kavkaz.memo.ru, which quoted an unnamed Chechen law-enforcement official as saying Geliskhanov has been interrogated and released, and the only outstanding charge against Geliskhanov was "participation in an illegal armed formation", qualifying him for an amnesty.

Chechen separatists called Geliskhanov "a private person" and according to Zakayev, by then an envoy of the separatist president Abdul-Halim Sadulayev, "the announced voluntary surrender of a powerful warlord is just an action of propaganda ... Geliskhanov had never fired a shot at federals that war." Geliskhanov himself said he had "long ago become disillusioned with the policy of Aslan Maskhadov". He also claimed that because of his disagreement with the political course of the separatist leadership he had not taken active part in fighting during both the first and second military campaigns and had remained out of the separatist government during the 1995-1999 inter-war period, and said he decided to surrender when Ramzan Kadyrov personally guaranteed safety for the former separatists "with no blood on their hands".
