= Magomed Geliskhanov =

Russian footballer

Personal information
- Full name: Magomed Rashidovich Geliskhanov
- Date of birth: 12 August 1986 (age 40)
- Height: 1.70 m (5 ft 7 in)
- Position: Midfielder

Senior career*
Years	Team	Apps	(Gls)
2000–2002	FC Neftyanik-INGP Malgobek		
2003–2006	FC Angusht Nazran	82	(1)
2007	FC Angusht Nazran (amateur)		
2009	FC Angusht Nazran	2	(0)
2010	FC IngGU Nazran		
- * Club domestic league appearances and goals

Magomed Rashidovich Geliskhanov (Russian: Магомед Рашидович Гелисханов; born 12 August 1986) is a former Russian professional football player.

== Club career ==
He played in the Russian Football National League for FC Angusht Nazran in 2006.
