= Pervomayskoye, Khasavyurtovsky District, Republic of Dagestan =

Pervomayskoye Первомайское
- Selo
- Location within Republic of Dagestan Location within Russia
- Coordinates: 43°26′N 46°20′E
- Country: Russia
- Region: Republic of Dagestan
- District: Khasavyurtovsky District
- Time zone: UTC+3:00

Pervomayskoye (Russian: Первомайское) is a rural locality (a selo) in Khasavyurtovsky District, Republic of Dagestan, Russia. Population: 1,379 (2021 census); 1,023 (2002 census); 598 (1989 Soviet census). There are 13 streets in this locality.

== Geography ==
Pervomayskoye is located 37 km northwest of Khasavyurt (the district's administrative centre) by road. Sovetskoye is the nearest rural locality.
