= Chechnya Spetsnaz base explosion =

2006 blast at special security unit barracks in Chechnya

- Date: February 8, 2006
- Venue: Kurchaloi
- Location: Grozny
- Cause: Gas leak
- Deaths: 13
- Injuries: 28
- Property damage: Two-story building collapsed

The Chechnya Spetsnaz base explosion was the February 8, 2006, blast at the Russian Defense Ministry's special security unit barracks at Kurchaloi near Grozny, Chechnya, which killed at least 13 Russian special forces troops and injured 28 more, according to the official statement.

The two-story building, which collapsed, housed a unit of about 200 GRU servicemen, of which some 43 were believed to have been inside at the time of the explosion. The officials said a gas leak was the most likely cause but did not rule out other theories. Chechen rebels reported on the gas explosion theory with scepticism but did not suggest outright that militants had targeted it.
