= Sovetskoye, Khasavyurtovsky District =

Sovetskoye Советское
- Selo
- Location within Republic of Dagestan Location within Russia
- Coordinates: 43°24′N 46°20′E
- Country: Russia
- Region: Republic of Dagestan
- District: Khasavyurtovsky District
- Time zone: UTC+3:00

Sovetskoye (Russian: Советское) is a rural locality (a selo) in Khasavyurtovsky District, Republic of Dagestan, Russia. The population was 1,362 as of 2010. There are 12 streets.

== Geography ==
Sovetskoye is located 34 km northwest of Khasavyurt (the district's administrative centre) by road. Pervomayskoye is the nearest rural locality.
