= Oyskhara =

Selo in Chechnya, Russia

Coordinates: 43°15′50″N 46°14′53″E

Oyskhara (Russian: Ойсхара; Chechen: Ойсунгур, Oysungur, or Ойсхар, Oysxar) is a rural locality (a selo) in Gudermessky District of the Chechen Republic, Russia. Population: 9,489 (2010 census); 12,767 (2002 census). This locality is located at latitude 43° 15' 50" N and longitude 46° 14' 52" E.

Until 1989, it was called Novogroznensky (Russian: Новогрозненский).

It was the site of fighting between Chechen Rebels and Russian soldiers in the First Chechen War.
