= Alleroy =

Alleroy (Russian: Аллерой) is the name of several rural localities in the Chechen Republic, Russia:

- Alleroy, Kurchaloyevsky District, Chechen Republic, a selo in Alleroyevskaya Rural Administration of Kurchaloyevsky District
- Alleroy, Nozhay-Yurtovsky District, Chechen Republic, a selo in Alleroyevskaya Rural Administration of Nozhay-Yurtovsky District
