= Budyonnovsk hospital hostage crisis =

1995 attack by Chechen separatists in southern Russia

Budyonnovsk hospital hostage crisis; Budyonnovsk Raid
- Part of the First Chechen War
- Hostages released from the hospital at Budyonnovsk
- Location: 44°47′02″N 44°09′57″E; Budyonnovsk, Stavropol Krai, Russia
- Date: 14–19 June 1995
- Attack type: Hostage crisis
- Deaths: 166
- Injuries: 415
- Perpetrators: Chechen separatists led by Shamil Basayev and Aslambek Abdulkhadzhiev
- Motive: Forcing ceasefire in the war, securing safe return to Chechnya

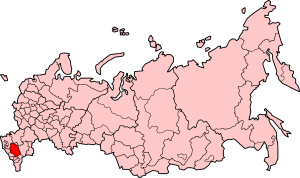
Location of Stavropol Krai territory on the map of Russia

The Budyonnovsk hospital hostage crisis (Russian: Теракт в Будённовске, lit. 'teract [terrorist act] in Budyonnovsk') took place from 14 to 19 June 1995. During the First Chechen War of 1994 to 1996, a group of Chechen separatists led by Shamil Basayev attacked the southern Russian city of Budyonnovsk near the breakaway Chechen Republic of Ichkeria. After brief fighting in the city, Basayev and his men seized a local hospital-complex where they gathered over 2,000 hostages, demanding a ceasefire in Chechnya and the resumption of negotiations between the Russian Federation and the Chechen leadership. Following several failed attempts by the Russian government to respond to the situation with force, Russian prime minister Viktor Chernomyrdin personally agreed to Basayev's demands, securing the release of the hostages. The terrorist act in Budyonnovsk was the first hostage crisis in post-Soviet Russia.

== Initial attack ==
Shamil Basayev's group of more than 100 Chechen separatist smertniki (ready to die) fighters crossed from the south of embattled Chechnya through the Russian republic of Dagestan into the Russian region of Stavropol Krai. They travelled in a column of three KamAZ military trucks led by a police VAZ-2106 car, their drivers dressed as Russian servicemen and pretending to be bringing a "Cargo 200" load of dead Russian troops from the war zone. They passed through more than 20 checkpoints unimpeded, paying small bribes to some of the Russian policemen and soldiers when this was demanded.

At about noon on 14 June 1995, the column was stopped by local police at Budyonnovsk (alternatively transliterated as Budennovsk), some 110 km (68 mi) north of Chechnya. Unable to afford the officer's bribe, the column was ordered to drive to the city's main police station for an inspection. On their arrival, Chechen fighters emerged from the trucks and opened fire, storming and capturing the police headquarters and city hall, and raising Chechen flags over local administration offices. Over the next several hours, as Russian reinforcements arrived, the Chechens retreated to the residential district and regrouped in the city's main hospital, taking hostages along the way. At this time, the attackers had killed as many as 41 people, including police officers, soldiers, personnel from Budyonnovsk air base, and civilians.

== Hostage crisis ==
Basayev's 119-strong group quickly fortified the hospital complex, mining the ground floor with explosives. They held more than 2,000 people (some estimates are as high as 5,000) hostage, most of them civilians, including 150 children and several women with newborn infants. Basayev issued an ultimatum to Russian authorities, threatening to kill the hostages unless his demands were met. The demands included an end to the First Chechen War, an amnesty for Chechen fighters, and direct negotiations by Russia with the representatives of Chechen president Dzhokhar Dudayev. He also demanded that Russian authorities immediately bring reporters to the scene and allow them to enter the Chechen position in the hospital. Russian authorities, in turn, threatened to kill 2,000 Chechen prisoners if Basayev did not surrender. Russian president Boris Yeltsin immediately vowed to do everything possible to free the hostages, denouncing the attack as "unprecedented in cynicism and cruelty". Over 300 hostages were released through low-level negotiations on 14 and 15 June.

At about 8 pm on 15 June, the Chechens killed one hostage, a military registration and enlistment official. The following day, when the reporters did not arrive at the arranged time, five additional male hostages were shot to death on Basayev's order. The New York Times quoted the hospital's chief doctor that "several of the Chechens had just grabbed five hostages at random and shot them to show the world they were serious in their demands that Russian troops leave their land." The five men taken outside to a courtyard and shot were, according to conflicting reports, either five military helicopter pilots, or three pilots and two policemen. Basayev explained the choice of the pilots as a result of his personal "special relationship" with them, referring to the death of his wife, child, and sister in an airstrike two weeks earlier, which he had sworn to avenge. Russian security minister Sergei Stepashin called the reports of the execution "a bluff". Later, however, Russian authorities relented and allowed a group of journalists to enter the hospital, where Basayev repeated his demands at a press conference.

On the third day of the siege, Russian authorities ordered security forces to retake the hospital compound. The task was given to a grouping of Internal Affairs (MVD) and Federal Security Service (FSB) special forces, including the elite units Alfa and Vympel, supported by armored vehicles and armed helicopters. The Russians attacked the next day (17 June) at dawn, meeting fierce resistance. After several hours of fighting, in which many hostages were killed by crossfire, a local ceasefire was agreed on. Basayev released more hostages, including all pregnant women and nursing mothers with their children. A second Russian attack on the hospital a few hours later also failed, as did a third, resulting in further casualties. The Russian authorities accused the Chechens of using the hostages as human shields. Yeltsin's human rights advisor Sergey Kovalyov described the scene:

In half an hour the hospital was burning, and it was not until the next morning that we found out what happened there as a result of this shooting. I saw with my own eyes pieces of human flesh stuck to the walls and the ceiling and burned corpses...

Nevertheless, the Russian troops had freed some hostages and Basayev soon released all remaining women and children. Both sides also agreed to the arrival of fire trucks and ambulances to extinguish fires and evacuate the dead.

== Resolution of the crisis ==
On 18 June, direct negotiations between Basayev and Russian prime minister Viktor Chernomyrdin led to a compromise. In a televised conversation with Basayev, Chernomyrdin agreed to halt military actions in Chechnya and begin top-level talks with separatist leaders. He then signed the formal statement:

Statement of the Government of the Russian Federation.

To release the hostages who have been held in Budennovsk, the Government of the Russian Federation:
1. Guarantees an immediate cessation of combat operations and bombings in the territory of Chechnya from 05 AM, 19 June 1995. Along with this action, all the children, women, elderly, sick, and wounded, who have been taken hostage, should be released.
2. Appoints a delegation, authorized to negotiate the terms of the peaceful settlement of conflict in Chechnya, with V. A. Mihailov as a leader and A. I. Volsky as a deputy. Negotiations will start immediately on the 18th of June 1995, as soon as the delegation arrives in Grozny. All the other issues, including the question of withdrawal of the armed forces, will be peacefully resolved at the negotiating table.
3. After all the other hostages are released, will provide Sh. Basayev and his group with transport and secure their transportation from the scene to Chechen territory.
4. Delegates the authorized representatives of the Government of the Russian Federation A. V. Korobeinikov and V. K. Medvedickov to deliver this Statement to Sh. Basayev.

Prime Minister of the Russian Federation
V. S. Chernomirdin
18 June 1995
20:35

The agreement resulted in the release of 350 additional hostages. Yeltsin, meanwhile, had gone to the G7 summit in Canada. After meeting with Yeltsin, the Group of Seven condemned violence on both sides of the Chechen conflict. When asked about the crisis by a journalist, Yeltsin denounced the rebels as "horrible bandits with black bands on their foreheads" ("Это оголтелые бандиты, понимаешь, с чёрными повязками").

On 19 June, the remaining hostages were released, though some remained as volunteer hostages to guarantee the safe passage of Basayev's group. There were more than one hundred such volunteers, (Note: During the withdrawal, each of the rebels was accompanied by a "volunteer" hostage shackled to them by the wrist.) including sixteen journalists, nine State Duma deputies (including Kovalev, Oleg Orlov, Mikhail Molostvov, Aleksandr Osovtsov, Valeriy Borshchev, Yuliy Rybakov and Viktor Borodin) and numerous other government officials and medical workers. Together, they boarded six buses and traveled to Chechnya through North Ossetia and Dagestan. Despite a rogue plot by interior ministry general Anatoly Kulikov to eliminate Basayev in an ambush at the Chechen border, the bus convoy reached the Chechen settlement of Zandak near the border with Dagestan. The volunteer hostages were then released, while Basayev, accompanied by some of the journalists, went on to the southern Chechen village of Dargo, Vedensky District.

== Casualties and damage ==
According to official figures, at least 129 people were killed and 415 were injured (including 18 who later died of their wounds) as a result of the attack. One official death toll included 105 civilians, 11 police and at least 14 military fatalities. However, according to an independent estimate, as many as 166 hostages were killed and 541 injured in the special forces assault on the hospital. A report submitted by Russia to the Council of Europe stated that a total of 130 civilians, 18 policemen, and 17 soldiers had been killed, and more than 400 people had been wounded. Of Basayev's forces, 11 men were killed and one went missing; most of the bodies were returned to Chechnya.

Over 160 buildings in the town were destroyed or damaged during the crisis, including 54 municipal buildings and 110 private houses. Many of the former hostages suffered psychological trauma and were treated at a special facility in Budyonnovsk.

== Aftermath ==
The government's handling of the hostage crisis was perceived as inept by many Russians. Hostages testified that many casualties were due to indiscriminate firing by security forces. The State Duma passed a motion of no confidence by a vote of 241 to 72; however, this was seen as purely symbolic, and the government did not resign. The debacle ultimately led to the resignations of FSB director Sergei Stepashin and interior minister Viktor Yerin on 30 June 1995. Yeltsin's absence during the crisis and the later mishandling of a similar hostage crisis in Dagestan raised serious questions of his leadership. A law was passed to prevent authorities from accepting terrorist demands while hostages were being held.

The agreement reached due to the raid is widely seen as the turning point in the war. It boosted morale among the hard-pressed Chechen separatists, shocked the Russian public, and discredited the Russian government. The negotiations sparked by the attack provided the Chechens with time to regroup and rearm. After peace talks broke down and hostilities resumed, Russian forces never truly regained a position of strength, and the war concluded in August 1996 with the signing of the Khasavyurt Accord.

Basayev obtained caesium-137 from an x-ray machine taken in the raid, which was distributed around Moscow in the world's first act of radiological terrorism. In the years following the hostage crisis, more than 40 of the attackers were tracked down and killed, including Basayev in 2006 and his deputy Aslambek Abdulkhadzhiev in 2002. At least 20 were sentenced by the Stavropol territorial court to various terms of imprisonment.

== See also ==
- Beslan school hostage crisis
- First Chechen War
- Kizlyar-Pervomayskoye hostage crisis
- List of hostage crises
- Moscow theater hostage crisis
