= Gudermessky District =

Gudermessky District Гудермесский район (Russian)
- District

Other transcription(s)
  - Chechen: Гуьмсен кӏошт
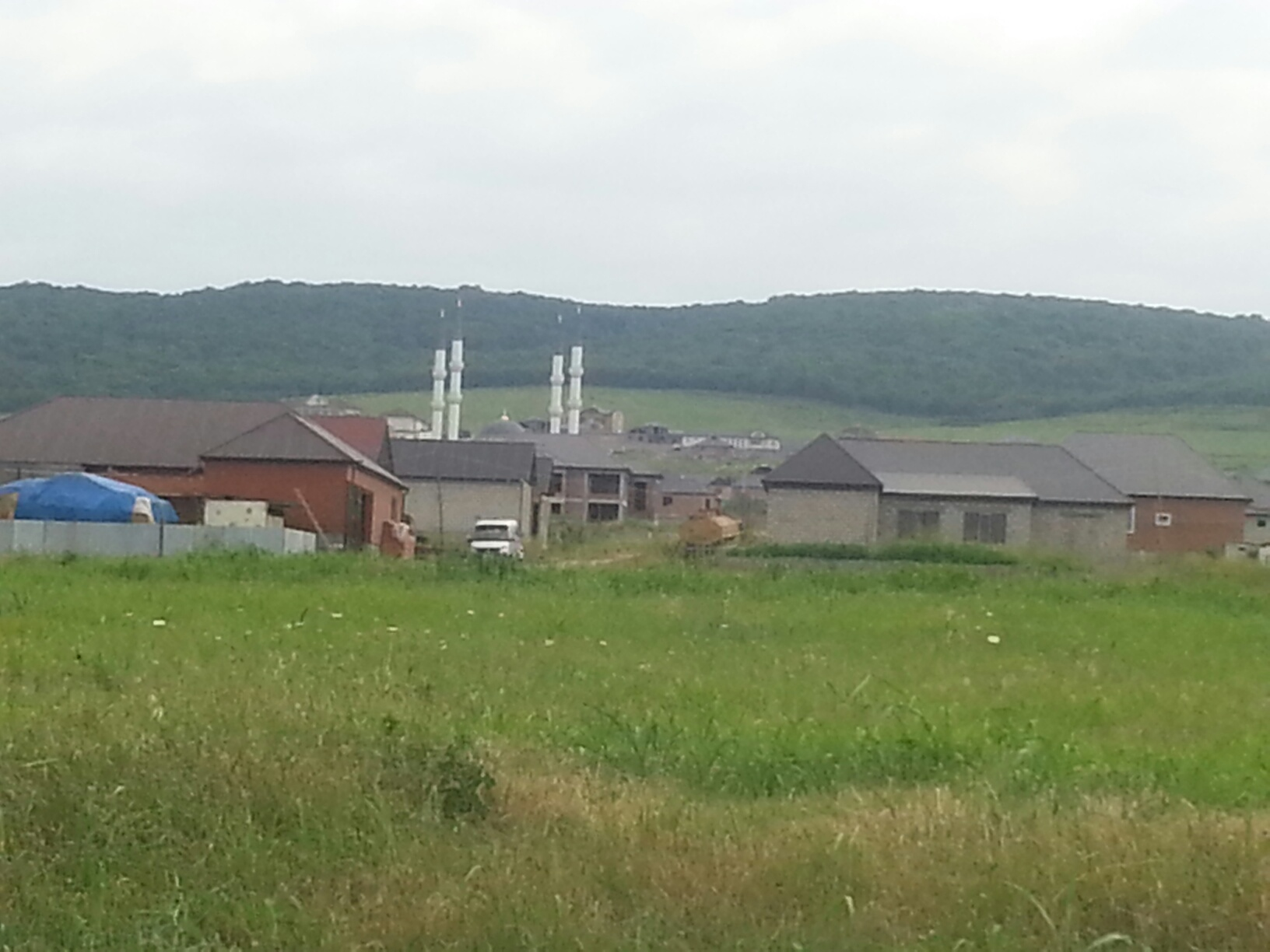
- New Benoy, Gudermessky District

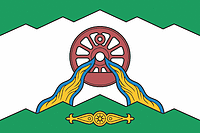
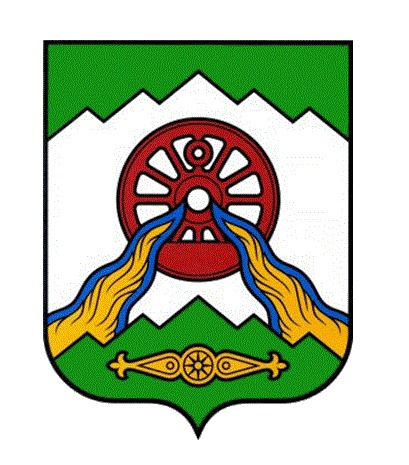
- Flag Coat of arms
- Location of Gudermessky District in the Chechen Republic
- Coordinates: 43°21′N 46°06′E
- Country: Russia
- Federal subject: Chechen Republic
- Established: March 1922
- Administrative center: Gudermes

Area
  - Total: 740 km^{2} (290 sq mi)

Population (2010 Census)
  - Total: 78,108
  - Density: 110/km^{2} (270/sq mi)
  - Urban: 0%
  - Rural: 100%

Administrative structure
  - Administrative divisions: 1 Urban-type settlements, 19 Rural administrations
  - Inhabited localities: 1 urban-type settlements, 19 rural localities

Municipal structure
  - Municipally incorporated as: Gudermessky Municipal District
  - Municipal divisions: 1 urban settlements, 20 rural settlements
- Time zone: UTC+3 (MSK)
- OKTMO ID: 96610000
- Website: http://gudermes1.ru/

Gudermessky District (Russian: Гудерме́сский райо́н; Chechen: Гуьмсен кӏошт, Gümsen khoşt) is an administrative and municipal district (raion), one of the fifteen in the Chechen Republic, Russia. It is located in the east of the republic. Its administrative center is the town of Gudermes (which is not administratively a part of the district). Population: 78,108 (2010 census); 71,082 (2002 Census); 45,136 (1989 Soviet census).

== Administrative and municipal status ==
Within the framework of administrative divisions, Gudermessky District is one of the fifteen in the republic. The town of Gudermes serves as its administrative center, despite being incorporated separately as a town of republic significance—an administrative unit with the status equal to that of the districts.

As a municipal division, the district is incorporated as Gudermessky Municipal District, with the town of republic significance of Gudermes being incorporated within it as Gudermesskoye Urban Settlement.

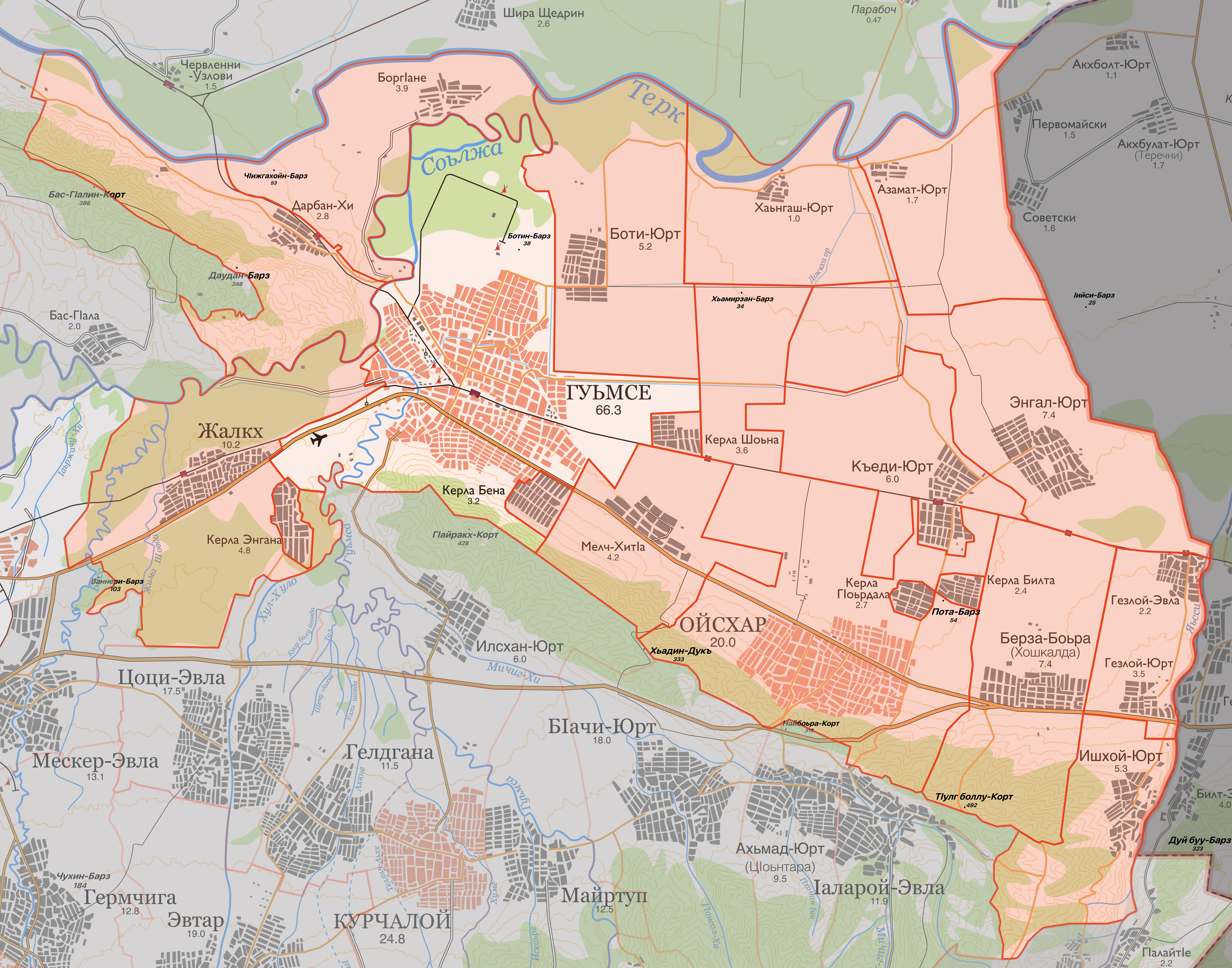
Administrative map of Gudermes District (in Chechen)

== Health care ==
State health facilities are represented by one central district hospital, a town hospital in Gudermes, and four district hospitals in Oyskhara, Engel-Yurt, Gerzel-Aul, and Koshkeldy. District state healthcare services here are reported to be among the best in the Republic; birth rates are also the highest in Gudermes (27.0). There are registered HIV cases in the district and a high prevalence of tuberculosis.
