= Gudermes =

Gudermes Гудермес
- Town

Other transcription(s)
  - Chechen: Гуьмсе, Гутӏермаӏас
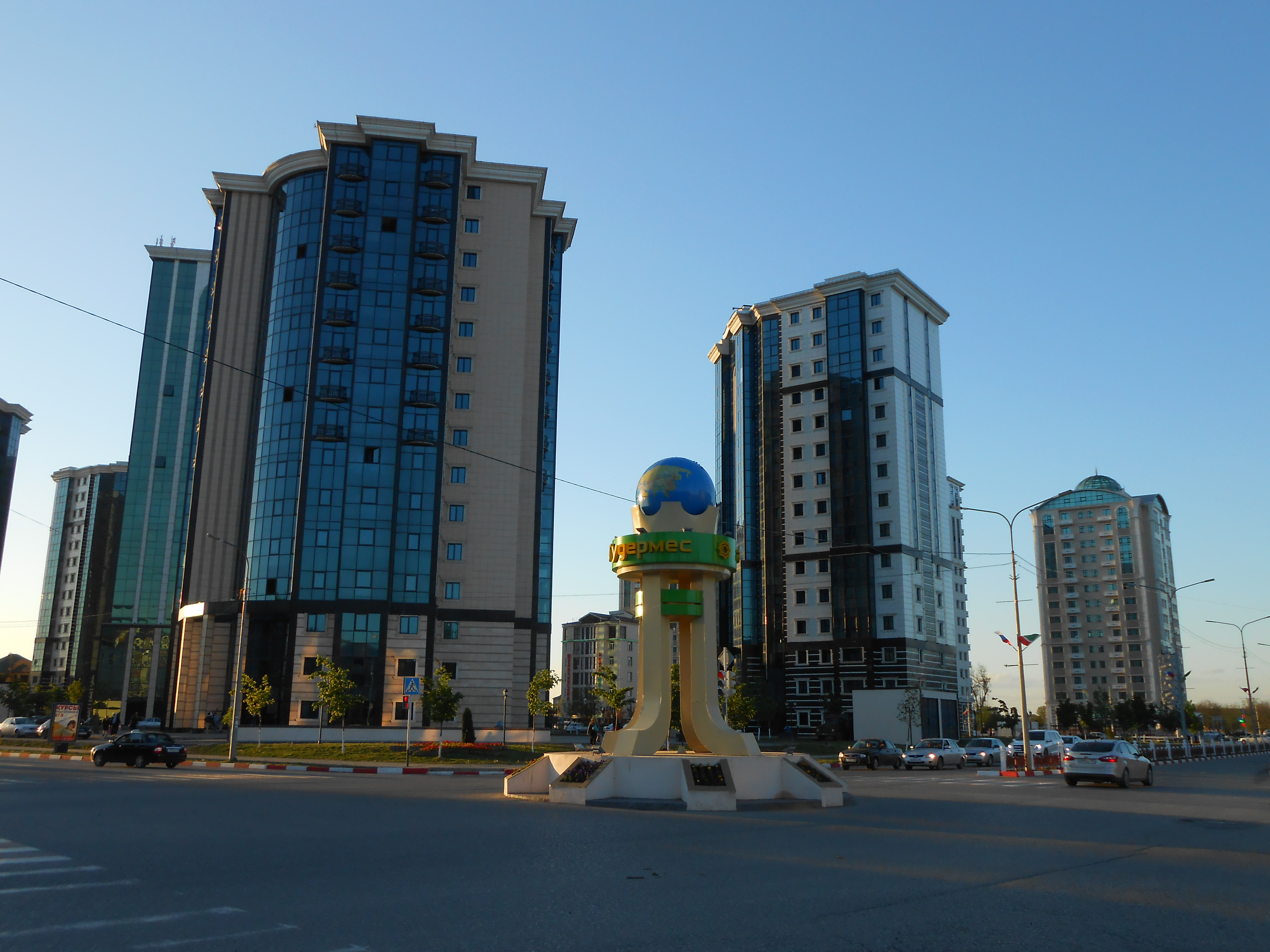
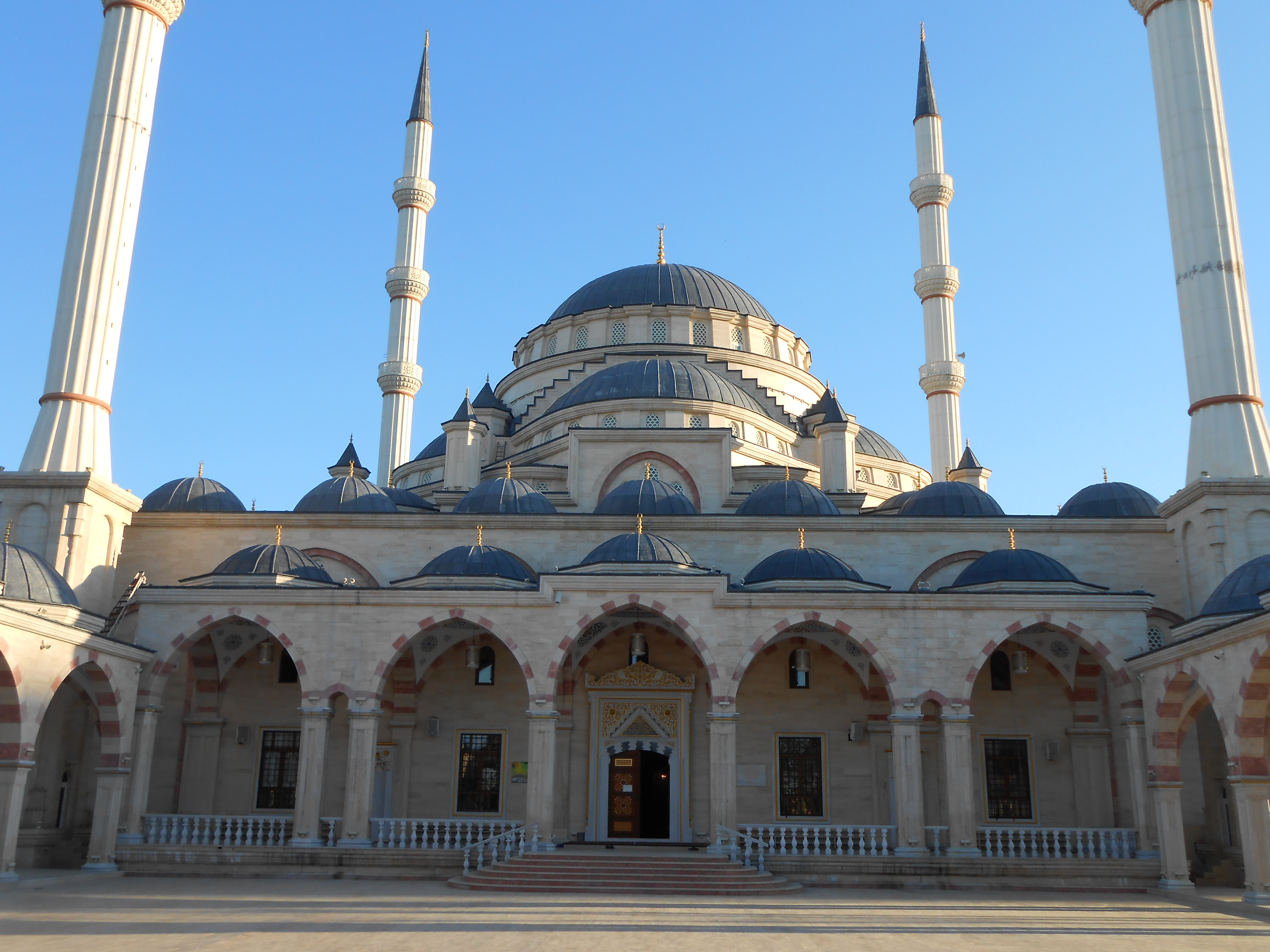
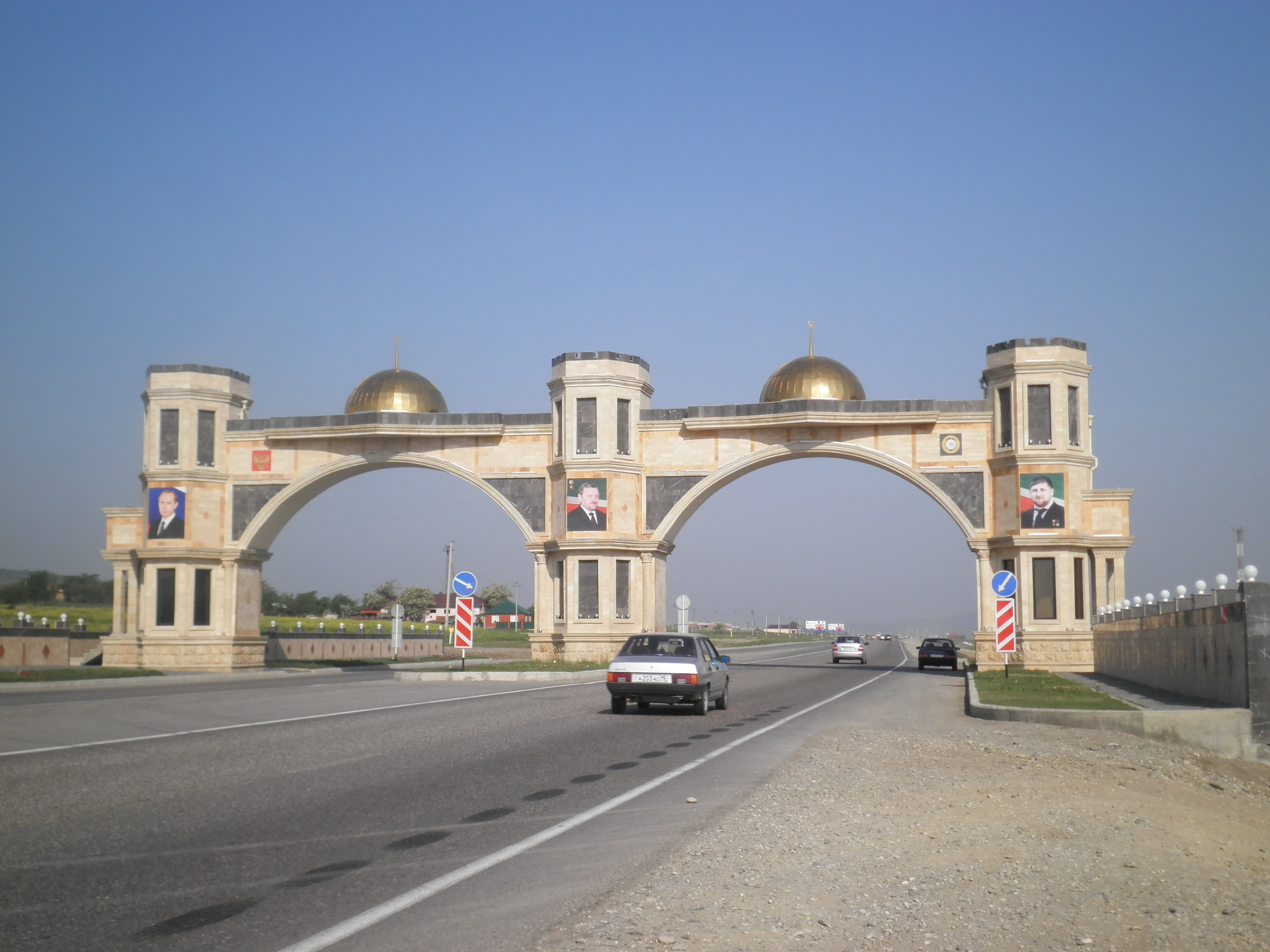
- From the top, Central Gudermes, Tashu-Haji Mosque, Entrance to Gudermes
- Interactive map of Gudermes
- Location of Gudermes Gudermes (Chechnya)
- Coordinates: 43°21′N 46°06′E
- Country: Russia
- Federal subject: Chechnya
- Founded: 1941
- Elevation: 55 m (180 ft)

Population (2010 Census)
  - Total: 45,631
  - Estimate (2025): 64,641 (+41.7%)

Administrative status
  - Subordinated to: town of republic significance of Gudermes
  - Capital of: town of republic significance of Gudermes, Gudermessky District

Municipal status
  - Municipal district: Gudermessky Municipal District
  - Urban settlement: Gudermesskoye Urban Settlement
  - Capital of: Gudermessky Municipal District, Gudermesskoye Urban Settlement
- Time zone: UTC+3 (MSK)
- Postal code: 366200
- OKTMO ID: 96610101001

Gudermes (Russian: Гудерме́с; Chechen: Гуьмсе, Gümse or Гутӏермаӏас, Guthermajas) is a town in the Chechen Republic, Russia, located on the Sunzha River 36 kilometers (22 mi) east of Grozny, the republic's capital. Population: 64,376 (2021 census); 45,631 (2010 census); 33,756 (2002 census); 38,089 (1989 Soviet census); 32,000 (1970).

== History ==
Gudermes had rural locality status until 1941. Later, it became a railroad junction between Rostov-on-Don, Baku, Astrakhan, and Mozdok.

== Climate ==
Gudermes has a humid continental climate (Köppen: Dfa) closely bordering a humid subtropical climate (Köppen: Cfa). Gudermes is one of the warmest places in Russia and has recorded one of Russia's highest temperatures, recording temperatures as high as 44.0 °C (111.2 °F) in July 1999.

Climate data for Gudermes, 1991-2020 normals, extremes 1936–present
| Month | Jan | Feb | Mar | Apr | May | Jun | Jul | Aug | Sep | Oct | Nov | Dec | Year |
|---|---|---|---|---|---|---|---|---|---|---|---|---|---|
| Record high °C (°F) | 17.7 (63.9) | 22.5 (72.5) | 31.7 (89.1) | 33.3 (91.9) | 37.8 (100.0) | 39.7 (103.5) | 41.5 (106.7) | 42.2 (108.0) | 41.0 (105.8) | 32.8 (91.0) | 23.9 (75.0) | 17.9 (64.2) | 42.2 (108.0) |
| Mean daily maximum °C (°F) | 2.8 (37.0) | 4.4 (39.9) | 11.1 (52.0) | 18.2 (64.8) | 24.2 (75.6) | 29.4 (84.9) | 32.2 (90.0) | 31.8 (89.2) | 26.0 (78.8) | 18.1 (64.6) | 9.4 (48.9) | 4.3 (39.7) | 17.7 (63.8) |
| Daily mean °C (°F) | −0.8 (30.6) | 0.2 (32.4) | 5.5 (41.9) | 11.6 (52.9) | 17.6 (63.7) | 22.7 (72.9) | 25.4 (77.7) | 24.9 (76.8) | 19.5 (67.1) | 12.7 (54.9) | 5.4 (41.7) | 1.0 (33.8) | 12.1 (53.9) |
| Mean daily minimum °C (°F) | −3.4 (25.9) | −2.8 (27.0) | 1.6 (34.9) | 6.6 (43.9) | 12.5 (54.5) | 17.3 (63.1) | 20.0 (68.0) | 19.4 (66.9) | 14.7 (58.5) | 8.7 (47.7) | 2.5 (36.5) | −1.6 (29.1) | 8.0 (46.3) |
| Record low °C (°F) | −29.9 (−21.8) | −27.4 (−17.3) | −21.0 (−5.8) | −5.3 (22.5) | −1.7 (28.9) | 6.5 (43.7) | 10.1 (50.2) | 6.6 (43.9) | −1.6 (29.1) | −9.8 (14.4) | −22.3 (−8.1) | −24.5 (−12.1) | −29.9 (−21.8) |
| Average precipitation mm (inches) | 32.5 (1.28) | 25.5 (1.00) | 32.9 (1.30) | 36.5 (1.44) | 56.5 (2.22) | 62.9 (2.48) | 43.8 (1.72) | 38.7 (1.52) | 49.3 (1.94) | 39.0 (1.54) | 37.3 (1.47) | 37.5 (1.48) | 492.4 (19.39) |
| Average precipitation days (≥ 1.0 mm) | 7 | 6 | 7 | 6 | 8 | 7 | 6 | 5 | 6 | 6 | 6 | 7 | 77 |
| Average relative humidity (%) | 85 | 83 | 78 | 72 | 71 | 66 | 63 | 64 | 72 | 80 | 84 | 85 | 75 |
Source 1: Погода и Климат
Source 2: NOAA (precipitation days-humidity 1991-2020)

== Administrative and municipal status ==
Within the framework of administrative divisions, Gudermes serves as the administrative center of Gudermessky District, even though it is not a part of it. As an administrative division, it is incorporated separately as the town of republic significance of Gudermes—an administrative unit with the status equal to that of the districts. As a municipal division, the town of republic significance of Gudermes is incorporated within Gudermessky Municipal District as Gudermesskoye Urban Settlement.

== Economy ==
Gudermes is home to petroleum extraction industries.
