= Chechnya constituency =

Russian legislative constituency

Chechnya single-member constituency
- Constituency of the Russian State Duma

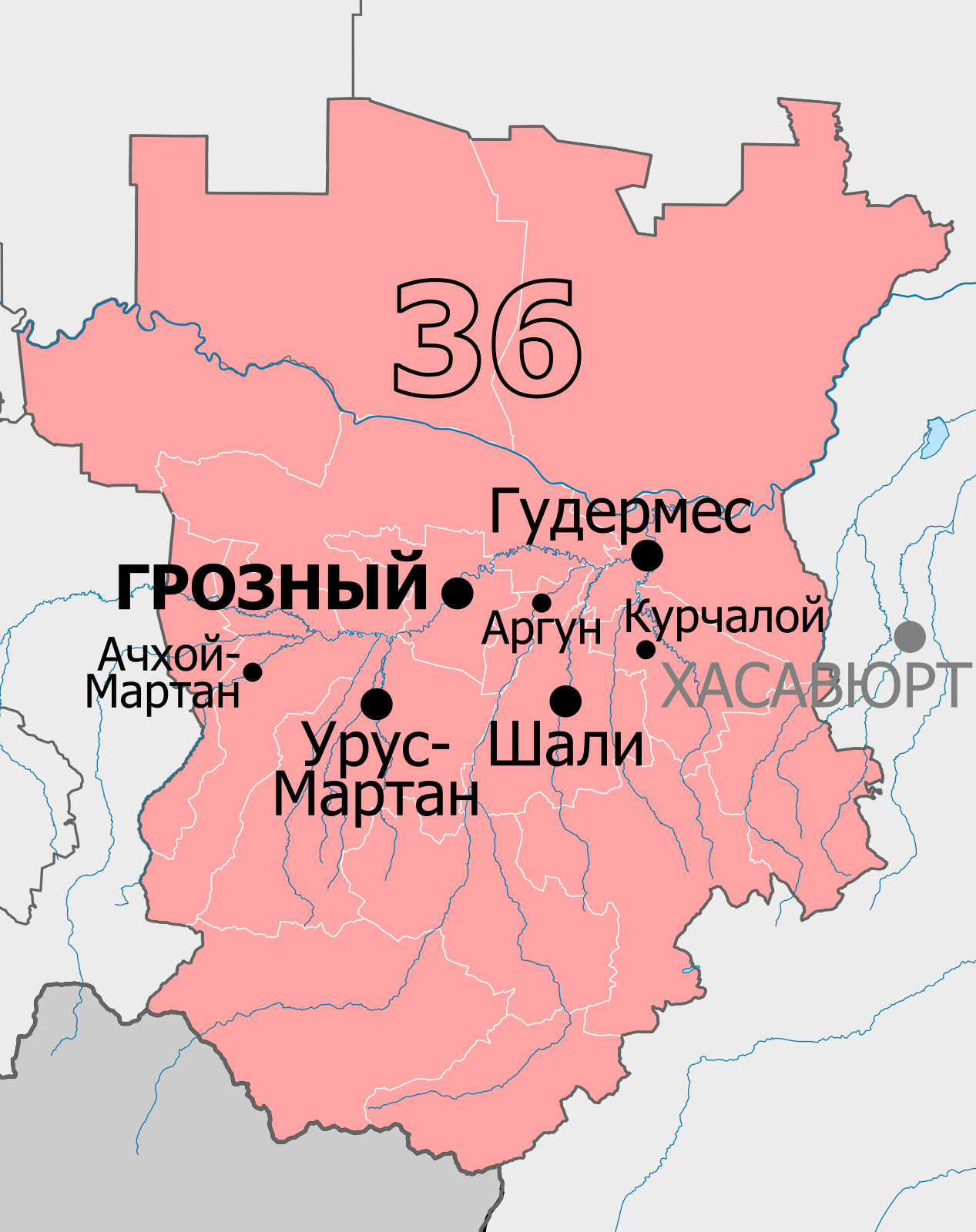
- Deputy: Adam Delimkhanov; United Russia
- Federal subject: Chechen Republic
- Districts: Achkhoy-Martanovsky, Argun, Groznensky, Grozny, Gudermes, Gudermessky, Itum-Kalinsky, Kurchaloyevsky, Nadterechny, Naursky, Nozhay-Yurtovsky, Sernovodsky, Shalinsky, Sharoysky, Shatoysky, Shelkovskoy, Urus-Martanovsky, Vedensky
- Voters: 873,771 (2026)

The Chechnya constituency (No.41 (Note: No.32 in 1993-1995 and 2003-2007, No.31 in 1995-2003, No.36 in 2016-2026)) is a Russian legislative constituency in Chechnya. The constituency encompasses the entire territory of Chechnya.

The constituency has been represented since 2016 by United Russia deputy Adam Delimkhanov, five-term State Duma member and Police Major General.

== Boundaries ==
1993–2007, 2016–present: Achkhoy-Martanovsky District, Argun, Groznensky District, Grozny, Gudermes, Gudermessky District, Itum-Kalinsky District, Kurchaloyevsky District, Nadterechny District, Naursky District, Nozhay-Yurtovsky District, Sernovodsky District, Shalinsky District, Sharoysky District, Shatoysky District, Shelkovskoy District, Urus-Martanovsky District, Vedensky District

The constituency has been covering the entirety of Chechnya since its initial creation in 1993.

== Members elected ==
Election	Member	Party
1993	The election was not held	
1995	Ibragim Suleymenov	Independent
1999	The election was not held	
2000	Aslambek Aslakhanov (Note: appointed aide to the President of Russia in September 2003)	Independent
2003	Akhmar Zavgayev	Independent
2007	Proportional representation - no election by constituency	
2011	Proportional representation - no election by constituency	
2016	Adam Delimkhanov	United Russia
2021	Adam Delimkhanov	United Russia
2026	Adam Delimkhanov	United Russia

== Election results ==
=== 1993 ===
The Government of the secessionist Chechen Republic of Ichkeria declined to take part in a State Duma election.

=== 1995 ===
==== Declared candidates ====
- Sainkhasan Abdulmazhidov (Independent), kolkhoz chairman
- Aslambek Aslakhanov (Interethnic Union), former People's Deputy of Russia (1990–1993), former Head of the Provisional Administration of Ingushetia (1992), militsiya major general
- Badrudi Dzhamalkhanov (Independent), Deputy Premier of Chechnya – Chairman of the Commission on Economic and Social Recovery (1994–present)
- Ibragim Galayev (Nur)
- Alash Saikhanov (APR), Minister of Agriculture and Food of Chechnya
- Ibragim Suleymenov (Independent), Military Commissioner of Chechnya (1995–present), former Member of Parliament of the Chechen Republic of Ichkeria (1992–1994), Russian Army major general

==== Results ====
Summary of the 17 December 1995 Russian legislative election in the Chechnya constituency
Candidate	Party	Votes	%
Ibragim Suleymenov	Independent	119,571	37.85%
Aslambek Aslakhanov	Interethnic Union	79,706	25.23%
Badrudi Dzhamalkhanov	Independent	63,095	19.97%
Alash Saikhanov	Agrarian Party	23,711	7.50%
Ibragim Galayev	Nur	11,947	3.78%
Sainkhasan Abdulmazhidov	Independent	6,823	2.16%
against all		5,851	1.85%
Total		315,942	100%

=== 1999 ===
State Duma election was not held due to continuing infighting in the region.

=== 2000 ===
Results by district: Aslambek Aslakhanov: 20–30% 30–40% 40–50% 50–60%; Shamalu Deniyev: 20–30% 30–40% 40–50% 60–70% 80–90%; Bekkhan Khazbulatov 20–30%; Lechi Magomadov 30–40%; Khozh-Akhmed Arsanov 30–40%; No data

==== Declared candidates ====
- Khozh-Akhmed Arsanov (Independent), Chairman of the Chechnya Committee on Youth
- Aslambek Aslakhanov (Independent), former People's Deputy of Russia (1990–1993), former Head of the Provisional Administration of Ingushetia (1992), militsiya major general, 1995 candidate for this seat
- Shamalu Deniyev (Independent), former Chairman of the Government of Chechen People Salvation (1994–1999)
- Ibragim Galayev (Independent), State Duma staffer, 1995 candidate for this seat
- Malika Gezimiyeva (Independent), Head of Gudermessky District
- Iysa Ibragimov (Independent), former Judge of the Nadterechny District Court (1996–1999)
- Ismail Kasumov (Independent), Head of the Chechnya Service of Employment and Social Development
- Bekkhan Khazbulatov (Independent), rector of Chechen State Pedagogical Institute (1995–present)
- Lecha Magomadov (Independent), former Chairman of the Chechnya Committee on National Salvation (1995–1996), former People's Deputy of the Soviet Union (1989–1991)
- Suleyman Makhmatkhadzhiyev (Independent), Deputy Mayor of Alkhan-Yurt
- Amin Osmayev (Independent), former Chairman of the People's Assembly of the Chechen Republic Chamber of Representatives (1996–1998)
- Visit Saraliyev (Independent), farmer
- Shuddi Visaitov (Independent), construction businessman

==== Withdrawn candidates ====
- Bislan Gantamirov (Independent), Deputy Head of the Chechen Republic (2000–present), acting Mayor of Grozny (2000–present)
- Rizvan Lorsanov (Independent), peacekeeper, community activist

==== Declined ====
- Ibragim Suleymenov (Independent), former Member of State Duma (1996–1999)

==== Results ====
Summary of the 20 August 2000 by-election in the Chechnya constituency
Candidate	Party	Votes	%
Aslambek Aslakhanov	Independent	91,116	30.31%
Shamalu Deniyev	Independent	59,859	19.91%
Bekkhan Khazbulatov	Independent	29,802	9.91%
Lechi Magomadov	Independent	29,318	9.75%
Khozh-Akhmed Arsanov	Independent	22,514	7.49%
Iysa Ibragimov	Independent	11,369	3.78%
Amin Osmayev	Independent	10,085	3.35%
Ismail Kasumov	Independent	9,443	3.14%
Malika Gezimiyeva	Independent	6,161	2.05%
Ibragim Galayev	Independent	4,286	1.43%
Suleyman Makhmatkhadzhiyev	Independent	3,853	1.28%
Shuddi Visaitov	Independent	3,248	1.08%
Visit Saraliyev	Independent	1,902	0.63%
against all		11,576	3.85%
Total		300,675	100%

=== 2003 ===
Results by district: Akhmar Zavgayev: 20–30% 30–40% 40–50% 50–60% 60–70% 70–80% 80–90% >90%; Alaudi Musayev: 70–80%

==== Declared candidates ====
- Gersolt Ermurzayev (NK–AR), former First Deputy Premier of the Checheno-Ingush ASSR (1990–1991), union leader
- Bekkhan Khazbulatov (Independent), rector of Chechen State Pedagogical Institute (1995–present), 2000 candidate for this seat
- Salambek Maigov (Independent), former chairman of the Eurasian Party of Russia executive committee, nonprofit president
- Alaudi Musayev (Independent), former First Deputy Minister Security of Chechnya, writer, retired militsiya colonel
- Amin Osmayev (NPS RF), former Chairman of the People's Assembly of the Chechen Republic Chamber of Representatives (1996–1998), 2000 candidate for this seat
- Milan Saidulayev (Independent), businessman, brother of entrepreneur Malik Saidullaev
- Akhmar Zavgayev (Independent), Senator from Chechnya (2000–present)

==== Withdrawn candidates ====
- Sherip Alikhadzhiyev (Independent), Head of Shalinsky District (1996–present)
- Ibragim Suleymenov (NPRF), Deputy Military Commandant of Chechnya (2002–present), former Member of State Duma (1996–1999)
- Musa Umarov (Independent), former Member of People's Assembly of the Chechen Republic (1996–1998), retired militsiya major general

==== Did not file ====
- Nikolay Arzhannikov (Independent), former People's Deputy of Russia (1990–1993) (ran in the Pervouralsk constituency)
- Valentina Baysarova (PME), Grozny Administration official
- Ruslan Martagov (Independent), former acting Minister of Press and Information of Chechnya (1996), writer
- Usman Masayev (ROPP), chairman of the republican chamber of commerce
- Zayndi Mavlatov (DPR), petrochemical executive
- Magomed-Emi Musayev (Independent), Chief State Veterinary Inspector of Chechnya
- Makka Naurbiyeva (Independent), middle school principal
- Saidmagomed Saayev (Independent), Deputy Chief Bailiff of Chechnya
- Ruslan Zakriyev (Independent), journalist

==== Results ====
Summary of the 7 December 2003 Russian legislative election in the Chechnya constituency
Candidate	Party	Votes	%
Akhmar Zavgayev	Independent	245,719	49.21%
Bekkhan Khazbulatov	Independent	67,871	13.59%
Salambek Maigov	Independent	66,037	13.23%
Alaudi Musayev	Independent	65,183	13.06%
Amin Osmayev	National Patriotic Forces	16,595	3.32%
Milan Saidulayev	Independent	14,925	2.99%
Gersolt Elmurzayev	New Course — Automobile Russia	9,292	1.86%
against all		8,050	1.61%
Total		499,423	100%

=== 2016 ===
==== Declared candidates ====
- Ruslan Avkhadov (CPRF), party secretary
- Maksim Chuvashov (CPCR), first secretary of the party Novosibirsk Oblast regional office
- Adam Delimkhanov (United Russia), Member of State Duma (2007–present)
- Ismail Denikhanov (A Just Russia), former Deputy Director of the Chechnya Department of External Relations (2012–2013)
- Albina Fatullayeva (LDPR), pharmacy lecturer

==== Declined ====
- Idris Cherkhigov (United Russia), Chief Secretary to the Head of the Chechen Republic Ramzan Kadyrov (2016–present), nephew of Ramzan Kadyrov (lost the primary)
- Akhmed Dogayev (United Russia), Chechnya Representative in Volgograd (2013–present) (lost the primary, ran on the party list)
- Turpal-Ali Ibragimov (United Russia), Head of Shalinsky District (2012–present), cousin of Ramzan Kadyrov (lost the primary)
- Islam Kadyrov (United Russia), Deputy Premier of Chechnya (2016–present), nephew of Ramzan Kadyrov (lost the primary, ran on the party list)
- Shamsail Saraliev (United Russia), Member of State Duma (2011–present) (lost the primary, ran on the party list)
- Magomed Selimkhanov (United Russia), Member of State Duma (2011–present) (lost the primary, ran on the party list)
- Isa Tumkhadzhiyev (United Russia), Chairman of the Accounts Chamber of Chechnya (2016–present), former First Deputy Premier of Chechnya (2012–2016) (lost the primary)
- Khozh-Magomed Vakhayev (United Russia), Member of State Duma (2007–present) (withdrew from the primary)

==== Results ====
Summary of the 18 September 2016 Russian legislative election in the Chechnya constituency
Candidate	Party	Votes	%
Adam Delimkhanov	United Russia	596,915	93.24%
Ruslan Avkhadov	Communist Party	19,097	2.98%
Ismail Denilkhanov	A Just Russia	15,089	2.36%
Albina Fatullayeva	Liberal Democratic Party	5,657	0.88%
Maksim Chuvashov	Communists of Russia	3,034	0.47%
Total		643,663	100%

=== 2021 ===
==== Declared candidates ====
- Khasan Abdulkadyrov (The Greens), unemployed
- Adam Delimkhanov (United Russia), incumbent Member of State Duma (2007–present)
- Khasmagomed Deniyev (CPRF), former First Deputy Chief of Staff to the President of the Chechen Republic (2003–2004)
- Umar Edelkhanov (RPPSS), homemaker
- Albina Fatullayeva (LDPR), pharmacy lecturer, 2016 candidate for this seat
- Isa Khadzhimuradov (SR–ZP), Deputy Chief of Staff to the Head of the Chechen Republic (2021–present), former Mayor of Grozny (2020–2021), 2021 head candidate
- Ruslan Khiziriyev (GP), Grozny Administration official

==== Failed to qualify ====
- Musa Salavatov (ROS), former Member of Gudermes Council of Deputies (2015–2020)

==== Results ====
Summary of the 17-19 September 2021 Russian legislative election in the Chechnya constituency
Candidate	Party	Votes	%
Adam Delimkhanov (incumbent)	United Russia	668,255	93.59%
Isa Khadzhimuradov	A Just Russia — For Truth	14,882	2.08%
Khasmagomed Deniyev	Communist Party	12,634	1.77%
Umar Edelkhanov	Party of Pensioners	7,388	1.03%
Sultan Khiziriyev	Civic Platform	5,611	0.79%
Khasan Abdulkadyrov	The Greens	3,711	0.52%
Albina Fatullayeva	Liberal Democratic Party	1,069	0.15%
Total		714,010	100%

=== 2026 ===
==== Declared candidates ====
- Adam Delimkhanov (United Russia), incumbent Member of State Duma (2007–present)
- Khasmagomed Deniyev (CPRF), former First Deputy Chief of Staff to the President of the Chechen Republic (2003–2004), 2021 candidate for this seat
- Isa Khadzhimuradov (A Just Russia), Member of Parliament of the Chechen Republic (2021–present), 2021 head candidate, 2021 candidate for this seat
- Dzhambulat Umarov (LDPR), former Deputy Premier of Chechnya (2020–2022)

==== Withdrawn candidates ====
- Rizvan Ibragimov (Yabloko), chairman of the party regional office

==== Did not file ====
- Abubakar Isakov (Independent), nonprofit chairman

==== Declined ====
- Usman Bashirov (United Russia), Deputy Premier of Chechnya – Minister of Labor, Employment, and Social Development (2025–present) (lost the primary)
- Idris Cherkhigov (United Russia), Chief State Automobile Inspector of Chechnya (2017–present), nephew of Ramzan Kadyrov (lost the primary)
- Zelimkhan Dzhamaldinov (United Russia), Member of Parliament of the Chechen Republic (2017–present) (lost the primary)
- Iles Masayev (United Russia), Mayor of Argun (2020–present) (lost the primary)
- Viskhan Matsuyev (United Russia), Deputy Premier of Chechnya – Minister of Agriculture (2023–present), son-in-law of Ramzan Kadyrov (lost the primary)
- Adnan Nagayev (United Russia), Deputy Chairman of the Parliament of the Chechen Republic (2021–present), Member of the Parliament (2016–present) (lost the primary)

==== Results ====
Summary of the 18-20 September 2026 Russian legislative election in the Chechnya constituency
Candidate	Party	Votes	%
Adam Delimkhanov (incumbent)	United Russia	791,829	95.21%
Dzhambulat Umarov	Liberal Democratic Party	24,167	2.91%
Isa Khadzhimuradov	A Just Russia	9,420	1.13%
Khasmagomed Deniyev	Communist Party	5,854	0.70%
Total		831,691	100%
