= 2026 Chechen legislative election =

Regional legislative election in Russia

- 18–20 September 2026

All 41 seats in the Parliament 21 seats needed for a majority
- Turnout: 95.18% ▲0.57 pp

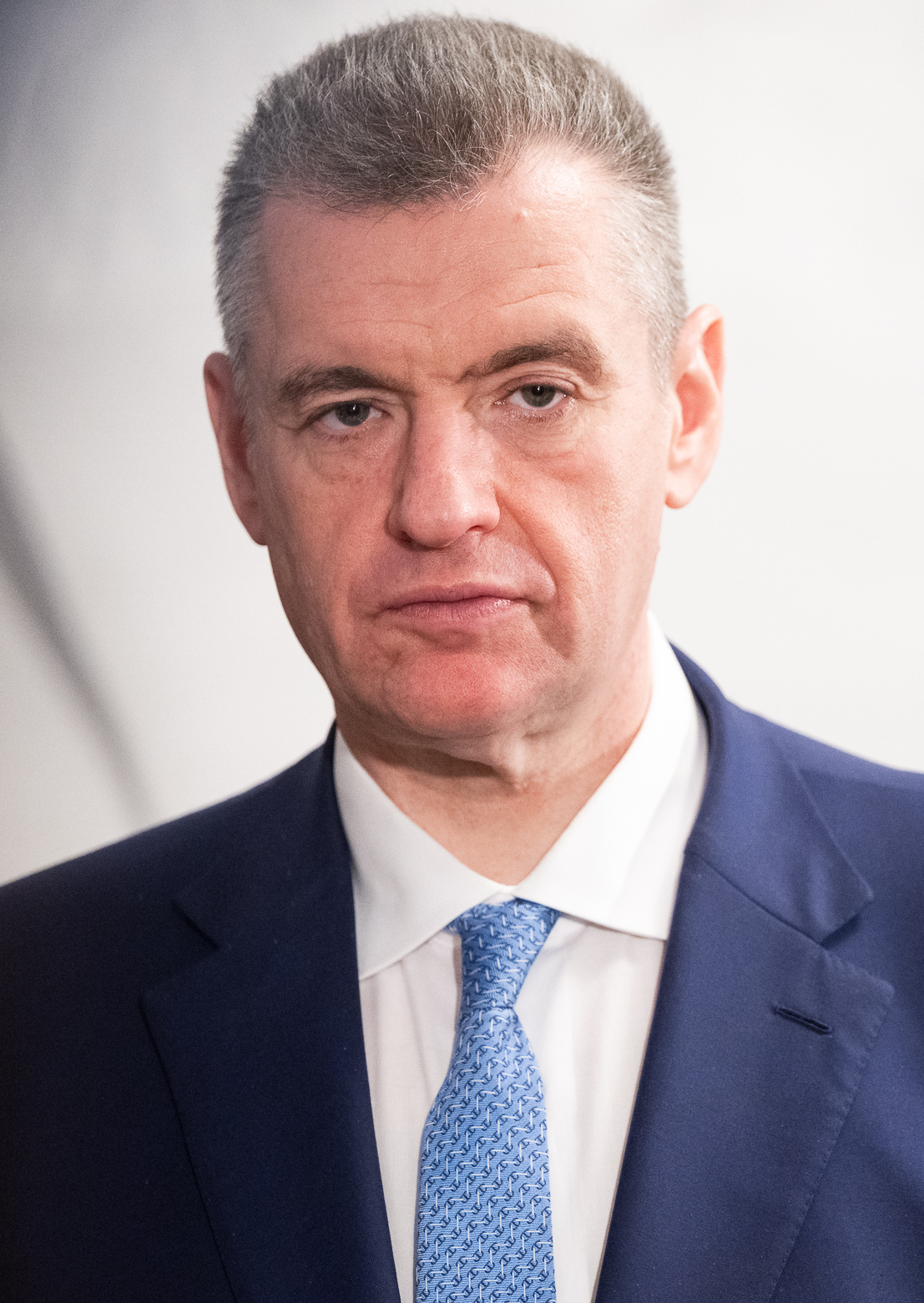
	Majority party	Minority party
		SR
Candidate	Ahmed Dudayev	Isa Khadzhimuradov
Party	United Russia	A Just Russia
Last election	89.20%, 37 seats	5.59%, 2 seats
Seats won	35	2
Seat change	▼2	Steady
Popular vote	699,880	45,025
Percentage	84.15%	5.41%
Swing	▼5.05 pp	▼0.18 pp
	Third party	Fourth party
	CPRF
Candidate	Khalid Nakayev	Leonid Slutsky
Party	CPRF	LDPR
Last election	5.16%, 2 seats	Did not participate
Seats won	2	2
Seat change	Steady	Did not participate
Popular vote	43,671	42,667
Percentage	5.25%	5.13%
Swing	▲0.09 pp	Did not participate
Chairman before election
Shaid Zhamaldayev
United Russia
Elected Chairman
Akhmed Dudayev
United Russia
Senator before election
Mokhmad Akhmadov
United Russia
Senator after election
Mokhmad Akhmadov
United Russia

The 2026 Parliament of the Chechen Republic election took place on 18–20 September 2026, on common election day, coinciding with the 2026 Chechen head election and 2026 Russian legislative election. All 41 seats in the Parliament were up for re-election.

United Russia retained its overwhelming majority in the Parliament, winning 84.2% of the vote, but lost two seats. Liberal Democratic Party of Russia narrowly entered the Parliament for the first time after party leader Leonid Slutsky established close ties to Chechen leader Ramzan Kadyrov.

== Electoral system ==
Under current election laws, 41 seats in the Parliament are elected for a term of five years by party-list proportional representation with a 5% electoral threshold. Seats are allocated using the Hare quota, Chechnya and Ingushetia are the only regions in Russia that are presently using the Hare quota in regional legislative elections. Unlike most regional elections in Russia, party lists in Chechnya are not divided between territorial groups.

== Candidates ==
=== Party lists ===
To register regional lists of candidates, parties need to collect 0.5% of signatures of all registered voters in Chechnya.

The following parties were relieved from the necessity to collect signatures:

- United Russia
- Communist Party of the Russian Federation
- Liberal Democratic Party of Russia
- A Just Russia
- New People

№	Party	Party-list leaders	Candidates	Status
1	A Just Russia	Isa Khadzhimuradov • Bekkhan Aibuyev • Apti Dubayev • Zelimkhan Suleimanov • Shamil Zhulagov	41	Registered
2	Communist Party	Khalid Nakayev • Islam Khatuyev • Khasmagomed Deniyev • ~~Lom-Ali Akhluyev~~ • Visadi Makharazhov	51	Registered
3	Liberal Democratic Party	Leonid Slutsky • Dzhambulat Umarov • Magomed Umarov • Magomed Alkhazurov • Umar Umarov	47	Registered
4	United Russia	Akhmed Dudayev • Magomed Dokhtukayev • Dzhamalay Zakriyev • Eskerkhan Tagiyev • Walid Abdureshidov	62	Registered

Liberal Democratic Party of Russia took part in the Chechen legislative election for the first time since 2013.

== Results ==
Summary of the 18–20 September 2026 Parliament of the Chechen Republic election results
Party	Votes	%	±pp	Seats	+/–
United Russia	699,880	84.15	▼5.05	35	▼2
A Just Russia	45,025	5.41	▼0.18	2	Steady
Communist Party	43,671	5.25	▲0.09	2	Steady
Liberal Democratic Party	42,667	5.13	New	2	New
Invalid ballots	448	0.05	▼0.01	—	—
Total	831,691	100.00	—	41	Steady
Turnout	831,691	95.18	▲0.57	—	—
Registered voters	873,771	100.00	—	—	—

Deputy Premier of Chechnya Akhmed Dudayev (United Russia) was elected Chairman of the Parliament, replacing outgoing Chairman Shaid Zhamaldayev (United Russia). Incumbent Senator Mokhmad Akhmadov (United Russia) was re-appointed to the Federation Council.

=== Members ===
Incumbent deputies are highlighted with bold, elected members who declined to take a seat are marked with ~~strikethrough~~.

Party lists
Member	Party
Akhmed Dudayev	United Russia
Magomed Dokhtukayev	United Russia
Dzhamalay Zakriyev	United Russia
Eskerkhan Tagiyev	United Russia
Walid Abdureshidov	United Russia
Idris Abubakarov	United Russia
Aslambek Aidamirov	United Russia
Alikhan Elembayev	United Russia
Mokhmad Akhmadov	United Russia
Nurdi Akhiyanov	United Russia
Ibragim Akhmatov	United Russia
Khumaid Borshigov	United Russia
Zelimkhan Dzhamaldinov	United Russia
Murat Gapurayev	United Russia
Dzhabrail Garnayev	United Russia
Ryzvan Dadayev	United Russia
Adlan Dinayev	United Russia
Arbi Dzhafarov	United Russia
Khusein Kadyrov	United Russia
Salman Zakriyev	United Russia
Walid Zainalabdiyev	United Russia
Sakhab Zakriyev	United Russia
Said-Magomed Khakimov	United Russia
Adnan Nagayev	United Russia
Imam-Ali Makhmutkhazhiyev	United Russia
Artur Khadzhiyev	United Russia
Surkho Munayev	United Russia
Dmitry Kashlyunov	United Russia
Zabek Rashayev	United Russia
Vakha Ustrakhanov	United Russia
Rizvan Tsabayev	United Russia
Ibragim Edilov	United Russia
Roman Edilov	United Russia
Musa Khanarikov	United Russia
Mokhmad Khanbiyev	United Russia
Isa Khadzhimuradov	A Just Russia
Bekkhan Aibuyev	A Just Russia
Khalid Nakayev	Communist Party
Islam Khatuyev	Communist Party
~~Leonid Slutsky~~	Liberal Democratic Party
~~Dzhambulat Umarov~~	Liberal Democratic Party
Magomed Umarov	Liberal Democratic Party
Magomed Alkhazurov	Liberal Democratic Party

== See also ==
- 2026 Russian regional elections
