= Mokhmad Akhmadov =

Russian politician (born 1972)

Mohmad Akhmadov
- Мохмад Ахмадов
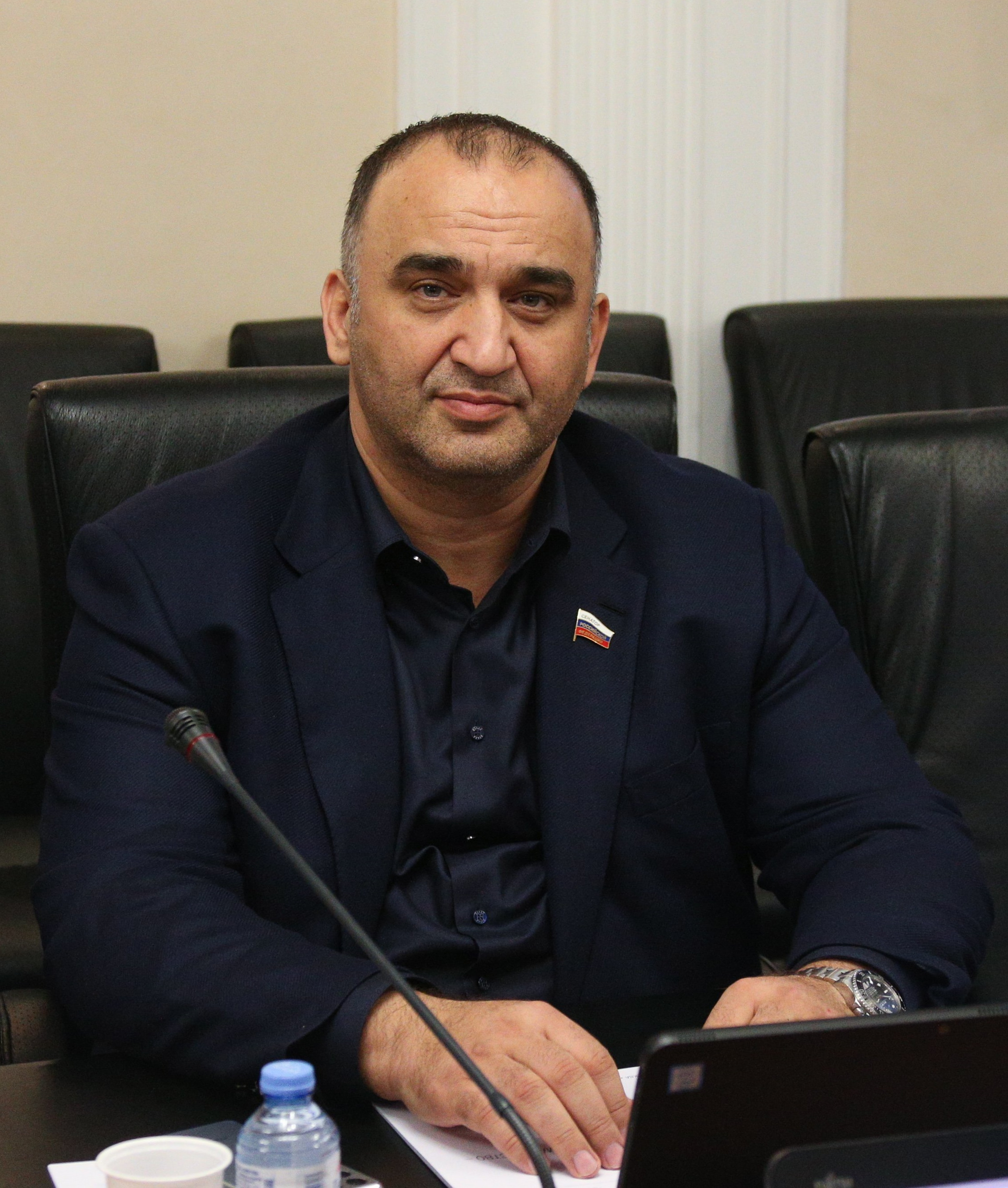

Russian Federation Senator from Chechnya
- Incumbent
- Assumed office 14 November 2019 Serving with Suleiman Geremeyev
- Preceded by: Ziyad Sabsabi

Member of the Chechen Parliament
- Incumbent
- Assumed office 2016

Minister of Labour of Chechnya
- In office 2008–2017

Personal details
- Born: Mohmad Akhmadov; 17 April 1972 (age 54) Shali, Chechen-Ingush ASSR, Russian SFSR, Soviet Union (now Chechnya, Russia)
- Party: United Russia
- Education: Chechen State Pedagogical Institute

Mohmad Isayevich Akhmadov (Russian: Мохмад Исаевич Ахмадов; born 17 April 1972) is a Russian politician serving as a senator from Chechnya since 2019. He is also a state legislator since 2016 and from 2008 to 2017 he served as Minister of Labour, Employment, and Social Development of Chechnya. Prior to entering politics, he was an economics professor.

== Biography ==
Mohmad Akhmadov was born on 17 April 1972 in the Chechen town of Shali. In 1995, he graduated from the Chechen State Pedagogical Institute.

From 1991 to 1992, he worked as an accountant of the Sintem-U cooperative. From September 1992 to August 1993, he was a tax inspector in Chechen Republic. From April 2000 to 2007, he was the senior lecturer at the Department of Economics and Production Management at Chechen State University.

On 19 November 2008, he was appointed Minister of Labour, Employment, and Social Development of the Chechen Republic.

In 2016, he was elected to the Parliament of the Chechen Republic. On 14 November 2019, he was appointed by the parliament to finish his now-predecessor's term as one of the two Chechen representatives in the Federation Council. On 4 October 2021, he was appointed to a full term. In the Council, Akhmadov is the Deputy Chair of the Committee on Social Policy.

In 2022, he effectively voted to recognise the independence of the Donetsk and Lugansk people's republics from Ukraine. As a result, in addition to being sanctioned by Ukraine itself, he was also sanctioned by the United States, Canada, United Kingdom, European Union, Switzerland, Australia and New Zealand.

== Awards ==
- 27 April 2023 — Order of Honour for a significant contribution to the development of parliamentarism, active legislative activity, and many years of conscientious work.
- 27 October 2008 — Order of Kadyrov for activities that contributed to the development of the social sphere and the strengthening of social protection in the Chechen Republic.
