= Ruslan Khasbulatov =

Russian economist and politician (1942–2023)

- Руслан Хасбулатов; Хасболтера Руслан
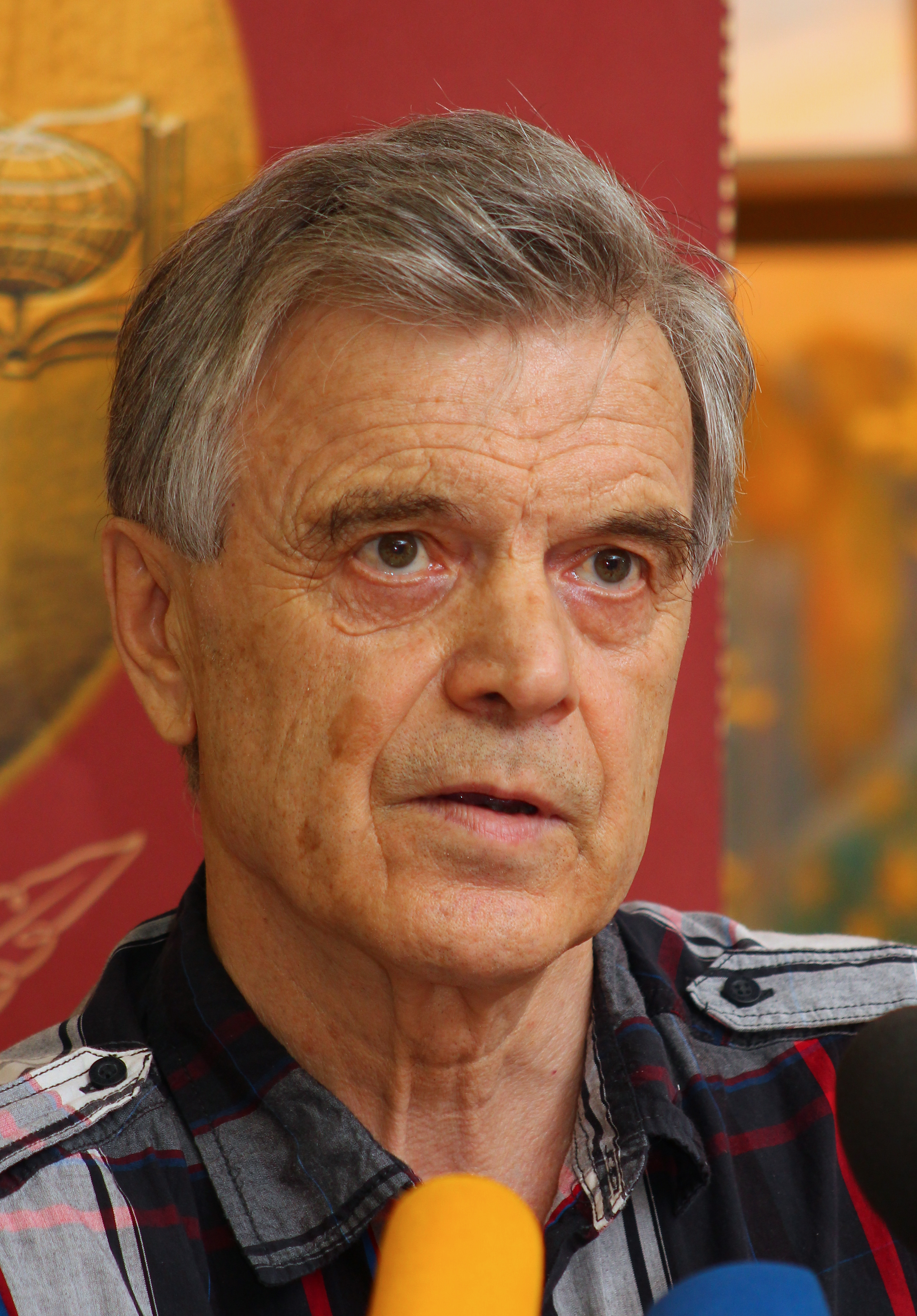
- Khasbulatov in 2011

Chairman of the Supreme Soviet of the RSFSR/Russian Federation
- In office 10 July 1991 – 4 October 1993
- Preceded by: Boris Yeltsin
- Succeeded by: Office abolished

Personal details
- Born: 22 November 1942 Tolstoy-Yurt, Checheno-Ingush ASSR, Russian SFSR, Soviet Union (now Chechen Republic, Russia)
- Died: 3 January 2023 (aged 80) Mozhaysky District, Moscow, Russia
- Party: CPSU (1966 to 1991)
- Education: Moscow State University
- Ruslan Khasbulatov's voice Khasbulatov on Russian economic reforms Recorded 1 March 2007

Ruslan Imranovich Khasbulatov (Russian: Русла́н Имранович Хасбула́тов, Chechen: Хасбола́ти Имра́ни кIант Руслан, romanized: Xasbolati Imrani khant Ruslan; 22 November 1942 – 3 January 2023) was a Russian economist and politician of Chechen descent. As chairman of the Parliament of Russia, he played a central role in the events leading to the 1993 Russian constitutional crisis.

== Early life ==
Khasbulatov was born in Tolstoy-Yurt, a village near Grozny, the capital of Chechnya, on 22 November 1942. In February 1944, he was deported to Central Asia during the Chechen deportations.

After studying in Almaty, Khasbulatov moved to Moscow in 1962, where he studied law at the prestigious Moscow State University. After graduating in 1966, he joined the Communist Party of the Soviet Union. He continued his studies, focusing on the political, social and economic development of capitalist countries, and received several higher degrees between 1970 and 1980. During the 1970s and 1980s, he published a number of books on international economics and trade.

== Political career ==
=== Entry into political life ===
In the late 1980s, Khasbulatov began to work closely with rising maverick in the Communist Party Boris Yeltsin. He was elected to the Congress of People's Deputies of the Russian SFSR in 1990. He followed Yeltsin in the successful resistance to the coup attempt in 1991. He quit the Communist Party in August 1991, and on 29 October 1991, he was elected speaker of the Supreme Soviet of RSFSR.

=== 1993 Constitutional Crisis ===
Khasbulatov had been an ally of Yeltsin in this period, and played a key role in leading the resistance to the 1991 coup attempt. However, he and Yeltsin drifted apart following the collapse of the Soviet Union at the end of 1991.

After the collapse of the USSR, Khasbulatov consolidated his control over the Russian parliament and became the second most powerful man in Russia after Yeltsin himself. Among other factors, the escalating clash of egos between Khasbulatov and Yeltsin led to the Russian constitutional crisis of 1993, in which Khasbulatov (along with Vice-President Alexander Rutskoy) led the Supreme Soviet of Russia in its power struggle with the president, which ended with Yeltsin's violent assault on and subsequent dissolution of the parliament in October 1993.

Khasbulatov was arrested along with the other leaders of the parliament. In 1994, the newly elected Duma pardoned him along with other key leaders of the anti-Yeltsin resistance.

=== "Professor Khasbulatov's peacekeeping mission" ===
In 1994, he organized the so-called "Peacekeeping Mission of Professor Khasbulatov". He traveled to Chechnya, trying to organize negotiations between the separatist leader, Ichkerian president Dzhokhar Dudayev and the anti-Dudayev opposition, as well as the Russian authorities. However, the mission was unsuccessful, the parties were not ready to make any compromises, in addition to the popularity of Dudayev at the time in Chechnya being extremely high, and Khasbulatov himself essentially joined the anti-Dudayev opposition.

A few months before Russian troops entered Chechnya, on August 20, 1994, Khasbulatov at a rally in the town of Shali in Chechnya called for the creation of a reconciliation commission and the signing of an agreement on the non-use of weapons by armed groups against each other.

On August 21 of the same year, a radio station of Khasbulatov's supporters began operating in the village of Tolstoy-Yurt. Thanks to its appearance, people started talking about "Professor Khasbulatov's peacekeeping mission". Seven armed groups joined the mission.

On August 25, Dudayev spoke at a rally of his supporters and, among other things, stated:

Khasbulatov's goal is to provoke a war in Chechnya in order to return to the Russian political arena on the blood of Chechens.

On August 26, news agencies reported that 20 armed groups had already joined Khasbulatov's peacekeeping mission. Umar Avturkhanov, leader of the anti-Dudayev opposition and chairman of the Provisional Council, and Khasbulatov meet in the village of Znamenskoye in the Nadterechny district and agree on joint actions against the Dudayev regime.

On August 29, at a meeting of leaders of opposition groups (Umar Avturkhanov, Khasbulatov, Ruslan Labazanov, Bislan Gantamirov) in the Nadterechny district, it was decided to unite the actions of opponents of the regime under the aegis of the Temporary Council of the Chechen Republic.

On September 7, representatives of the mission arrived at the headquarters of the anti-Dudayev opposition, the Temporary Council of the Chechen Republic, to work out a strategy for further joint actions.

With the outbreak of hostilities at the end of the year, Khasbulatov returned to Moscow, where he continued to work at his department at the institute.

In 1995, when the active stage of the military conflict was unfolding in Chechnya, Khasbulatov, who, according to the newspaper Vremya Novostei, had influence in the Chechen diaspora, again offered to act as a mediator. However, the Russian authorities refused his services. In 2005, Khasbulatov claimed that Dudayev had plotted with Yeltsin when he wanted to deprive him (Khasbulatov) of his deputy position.

=== Chechen politics ===
Khasbulatov considered running as a candidate in the 2003 election for President of the Chechen Republic, following the Second Chechen War, but ultimately chose not to run. In the 2021 Chechen head election, he endorsed incumbent Ramzan Kadyrov.

== Later life ==
Following the end of his political career, Khasbulatov returned to his earlier profession as a teacher of economics as founder and head of the Department of International Economy at the Plekhanov Russian Academy of Economics (REA). He continued to comment on political developments in Russia. His death was reported on 3 January 2023.

Political offices
Preceded by Boris Yeltsin	Chairman of the Supreme Soviet of the Russian SFSR/Russian Federation; 1991–1993	Office abolished
