= 2026 Chechen head election =

Regional legislative election in Russia

- 18–20 September 2026
- Turnout: 95.19% ▲0.58 pp
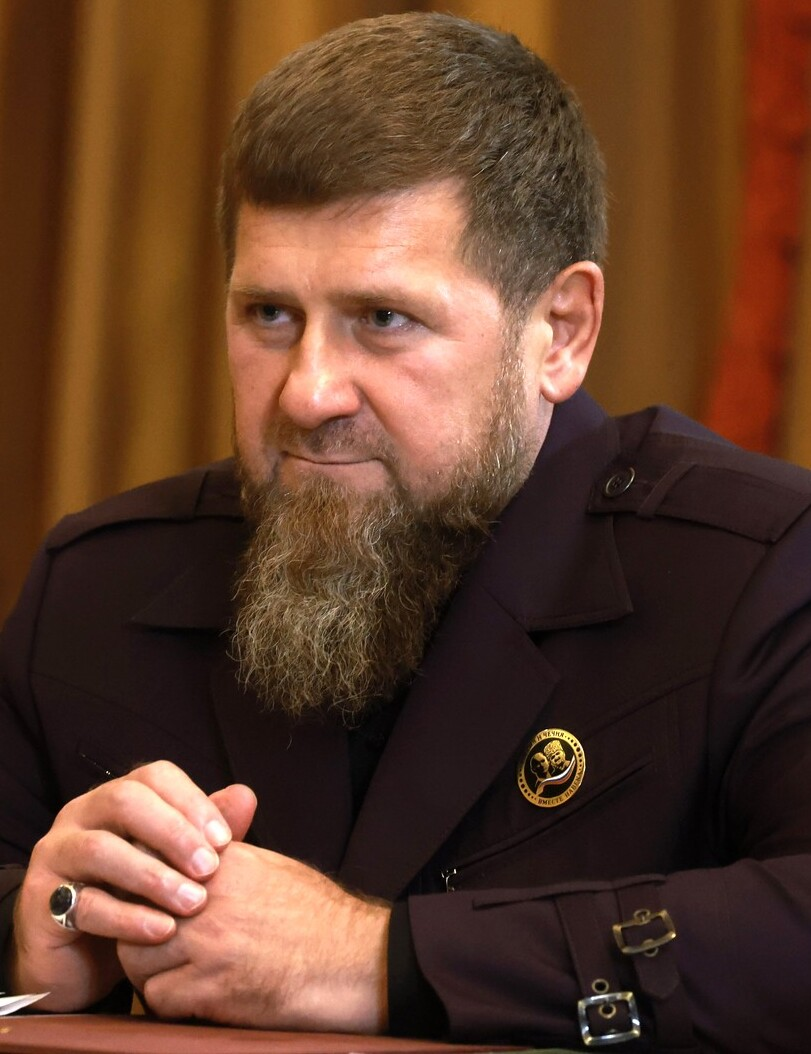
Candidate	Ramzan Kadyrov
Party	United Russia
Popular vote	830,690
Percentage	99.85%
Head before election
Ramzan Kadyrov
United Russia
Head-elect
Ramzan Kadyrov
United Russia
Senator before election
Suleiman Geremeyev
United Russia
Senator after election
Suleiman Geremeyev
United Russia

The 2026 Chechen Republic head election took place on 18–20 September 2026, on common election day, to elect the Head of the Chechen Republic, coinciding with the 2026 Chechen legislative election and 2026 Russian legislative election. Incumbent Head Ramzan Kadyrov won re-election for a fifth term in office.

== Background ==
Then-Prime Minister of the Chechen Republic Ramzan Kadyrov, son of the former President of the Chechen Republic Akhmat Kadyrov, was appointed acting President in February 2007, replacing first-term incumbent Alu Alkhanov, who was appointed Deputy Minister of Justice of Russia after a long-standing conflict between the two officials. In March 2007 Kadyrov was elected for a full term by the Parliament of the Chechen Republic with 56 votes for (two ballots were voided). From that point Kadyrov had strengthened his hold on power in Chechnya, easily winning re-election in 2011 (unanimously by the Parliament), 2016 (97.94%) and 2021 (99.70%).

Over the years Kadyrov has established an oppressive authoritarian regime in Chechnya through suppression of political opponents up to their physical elimination, massive corruption, cronyism, and religious zealotism. Kadyrov's numerous relatives and allies enjoy immense power in the region, holding all key positions in the government and economy; Ramzan Kadyrov's own children are high-ranking government officials: Akhmat Kadyrov (since 2026) and Aishat Kadyrova (2023–2025) has served as Deputy Prime Ministers, while Khadizhat Kadyrova and Khutmat Kadyrova are working as their father's first deputy chief of staff and deputy head of the secretariat, respectively. Unusually for a Russian governor, Ramzan Kadyrov exercises full control over military and security forces regional branches, which are collectively known as Kadyrovites, serving as the de-facto "Kadyrov's personal army". Ramzan Kadyrov also established close ties with the rulers of Saudi Arabia, the United Arab Emirates and Bahrain, based on shared Muslim faith and economic investments, Kadyrov's family and allies even bought lavish real estate in Dubai. President of Russia Vladimir Putin tolerates Kadyrov and views him indispensable in his control over Chechnya and extreme loyalty, while federal transfers constitute 92% of the annual republican budget (78.8% of the budget are gratuitous transfers).

Several times Ramzan Kadyrov mused with retirement, however, each time he deferred to Vladimir Putin's personal judgement and confidence in the Chechen leader. Since the retirement of Sergey Morozov as Governor of Ulyanovsk Oblast in April 2021 Kadyrov has become the longest-serving incumbent Russian governor. In April 2024 Novaya Gazeta Europe alleged that then 47-year-old Ramzan Kadyrov was experiencing severe ailments, most likely, pancreas necrosis, since January 2019; in 2023 Kadyrov reportedly had kidney transplant in Moscow Central Clinical Hospital but the organ was rejected. Kadyrov and his allies have consistently denied the rumours surrounding Kadyrov's health and tried to dissuade them through public and media presence, yet, by September 2025 some video reports showed Kadyrov had trouble walking and standing. Allegedly, Ramzan Kadyrov selected his 18-year-old son Adam Kadyrov as a preferred successor as he saw a meteoric rise becoming head of his father's security detail in 2023 and Secretary of the Chechen Republic Security Council in 2025. Nonetheless, age restrictions prevent Adam Kadyrov from succeeding his father imminently, so a temporary regent could be appointed until Adam Kadyrov becomes of age (as happened with his father). Among those potential regents were named Akhmat volunteer special forces unit commander Apti Alaudinov, State Duma member Adam Delimkhanov, Prime Minister Magomed Daudov, former Prime Minister Ruslan Edelgeriev, Deputy Prime Minister Abuzaid Vismuradov and former Kadyrov's chief of staff Yakub Zakriyev.

Despite the ongoing rumours, Ramzan Kadyrov announced in December 2025 his willingness to seek another term if his candidacy is supported by Putin. Kadyrov reiterated his decision in February 2026 after he was asked to run again by Daudov. In April 2026 Putin met with Kadyrov and publicly endorsed the Chechen head for another turn.

== Candidates ==
In Chechnya candidates for Head of the Chechen Republic can be nominated only by registered political parties. Candidate for Head of the Chechen Republic should be a Russian citizen and at least 30 years old. Candidates for Head of the Chechen Republic should not have a foreign citizenship or residence permit. Each candidate in order to be registered is required to collect at least 7% of signatures of municipal deputies and heads of municipalities. Also head candidates present 3 candidacies to the Federation Council and election winner later appoints one of the presented candidates.

=== Declared ===
Candidate name, political party	Occupation	Status	Ref.
Ismail Denilkhanov; A Just Russia	Chairman of the Chechen Republic Civic Chamber (2017–present); Former Member of Parliament of the Chechen Republic (2016–2017)	Registered	
Ramzan Kadyrov; United Russia	Incumbent Head of the Chechen Republic (2007–present)	Registered	
Khalid Nakayev; Communist Party	Member of Parliament of the Chechen Republic (2016–present); 2021 head candidate	Registered	

== Results ==
Summary of the 18–20 September 2026 Chechen head election results
Candidate	Party	Votes	%
Ramzan Kadyrov (incumbent)	United Russia	830,690	99.85
Ismail Denilkhanov	A Just Russia	451	0.05
Khalid Nakayev	Communist Party	437	0.05
Valid votes		831,578	99.96
Blank ballots		368	0.04
Total		831,946	100.00
Turnout		831,946	95.19
Registered voters		873,981	100.00

Head Kadyrov re-appointed incumbent Senator Suleiman Geremeyev (United Russia) to the Federation Council.

== See also ==
- 2026 Russian regional elections
