= Chechen-Ingush State Pedagogical Institute =

Chechen-Ingush State Pedagogical Institute:

- Chechen-Ingush State Pedagogical Institute, the name of Chechen State University in 1938-1971.
- Chechen-Ingush State Pedagogical Institute, the name of Chechen State Pedagogical University in 1980-1995.
