= Ruslan Alikhadzhiyev =

Chechen brigadier general and politician (1961–disappeared 2000)

- Руслан Алихаджиев

4th Chairman of the Parliament of the Chechen Republic of Ichkeria
- In office 17 March 1997 – May 2000
- Preceded by: Akhyad Idigov
- Succeeded by: Dardali Khiryayev

Personal details
- Born: 1961 (age 64–65) Shali, Checheno-Ingush ASSR, Soviet Union
- Party: National Independence Party
- Awards: Qoman Siy

Military service
- Allegiance: Chechnya
- Years of service: 1994–2000
- Rank: Brigadier general
- Commands: Southern Front
- Battles/wars: First Chechen War; Second Chechen War
- Disappeared: 17 May 2000 (aged 38–39); Shali, Chechnya
- Status: Declared dead in absentia 5 July 2007

Ruslan Shamilevich Alikhadzhiyev (Russian: Руслан Шамилевич Алихаджиев; 1961 – disappeared 17 May 2000) was a Chechen brigadier general and politician who was Speaker of the Parliament of the Chechen Republic of Ichkeria. He was forcibly disappeared by Russian forces in 2000, during the early stages of the Second Chechen War, and presumably murdered.

== Life ==
Alikhadzhiyev was born in 1961 and fought in the First Chechen War as a field commander. From 1997 to 1999, he was the Chairman of the Parliament of the Chechen Republic of Ichkeria. During the Second Chechen War, he did not take an active part in hostilities and instead sought a negotiated end to the war on behalf of Chechen President Aslan Maskhadov.

== Forced disappearance ==
On 17 May 2000, Alikhadzhiyev was detained by a large group of uniformed Russian soldiers who arrived by armoured vehicles and helicopters at his home in Shali. Alikhadzhiyev, who was with his four minor children and was caring for a sick mother, did not resist; he was handcuffed, blindfolded and taken by an armoured vehicle to a location nearby, which is where he was last seen. Five more men were detained with him at the other locations in Shali this night, but they were all released the next day. On 25 May, Colonel general Valery Manilov confirmed the arrest during a press conference, and on 1 August the state news agency RIA Novosti announced that "Ruslan Alikhadzhiyev, one of the closest allies of Maskhadov, was captured in a special operation by the FSB."

In September 2000, Maskhadov's Chechenpress service claimed Alikhadzhiyev was tortured to death in the Moscow's Lefortovo Prison; AFP, citing sources close to the Chechen leadership, reported that Alikhadzhiyev had died of a heart attack in the Lefortovo. However, the FSB, which operates Lefortovo, denied that it is holding Alikhadzhiyev. On 21 September 2000, Yuri Biryukov, the Senior Deputy Prosecutor General of the Russian Federation, said answering to a question asked in the Russian State Duma regarding the whereabouts of Alikhadzhiyev that he was killed in August by "the same group of unknown armed people" that had abducted him. A Shalinsky District's prosecutor's office said it opened a case for kidnapping, but "the steps taken to identify the individuals responsible for this crime have been unsuccessful" and the investigation was suspended on 12 December 2000. The case of disappearance and presumed death of Alikhadzhiyev was used by Sergei Kovalev in his defense of Akhmed Zakayev, Maskhadov's envoy on Europe, before the British extradition court in 2003; Zakayev was soon granted a political asylum in Britain.

In July 2007, in the case Alikhadzhieva v Russia, the European Court of Human Rights found Russian authorities responsible for the "disappearance" and presumed killing of Alikhadzhiev and ordered the government to pay his mother 40,000 euros ($54,500) in damages, as well as about 5,000 euros ($5,382) for costs and expenses incurred.
