= Akhmed Dogayev =

Russian politician

- Ахмед Догаев
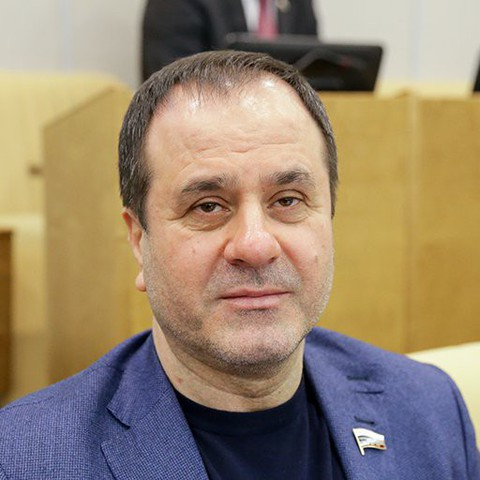

Member of the State Duma
- Incumbent
- Assumed office 5 October 2016

Personal details
- Born: 18 August 1965 (age 61) Belorechie, Checheno-Ingush Autonomous Soviet Socialist Republic, USSR
- Party: United Russia
- Education: Chechen State Pedagogical Institute

Akhmed Dogayev (Russian: Ахмед Шамханович Догаев; born 18 August 1965, Belorechie, Checheno-Ingush Autonomous Soviet Socialist Republic) is a Russian political figure and a deputy the 7th and 8th State Dumas. From 2013 to 2016, he headed the representation of the Head of the Chechen Republic in the Southern Federal District. In 2015, he was elected chairman of the Council of representatives of the head of the Chechen Republic in the constituent entities of the Russian Federation.

In 2016, he ran for the 7th State Duma from the Chechnya constituency but was not elected. However, on 28 September 2016, he received the mandate from Ramzan Kadyrov, who won the Chechen head election and, thus, declined the offer to join the State Duma. In 2021, Dogaev took 348 out of 434 places in the so-called Ranking of the Deputies' Usefulness; he received zero points for his lack of participation in the discussions. In September 2021, Akhmed Dogayev was re-elected as a deputy of the 8th State Duma.

== Family ==
Akhmed Dogayev is married and has four daughters.

== Awards ==
In 2022, he was awarded the Order of Courage.

== Sanctions ==
On 24 March 2022, the United States Treasury sanctioned him in response to the 2022 Russian invasion of Ukraine.
