= Akhmar Zavgayev =

Russian politician

- Ахмар Завгаев
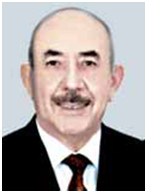

Member of the State Duma
- In office 7 December 2003 – 2011

Russian Federation Senator from the Chechen Republic
- In office 24 October 2000 – 7 December 2003
- Succeeded by: Umar Dzhabrailov

Personal details
- Born: Akhmar Gapurovich Zavgayev; 20 December 1947 (age 78) Tokareva, Kazakh SSR, Soviet Union
- Party: United Russia

Akhmar Gapurovich Zavgayev (Russian: Ахмар Гапурович Завгаев; born 20 December 1947), is a Russian politician who served as a member of the State Duma of the fourth and fifth convocations.

He is a member of the United Russia faction. He was a member of the State Duma Committee on Budget and Taxes (formerly a member of the Committee on Economic Policy, Entrepreneurship and Tourism, a member of the Commission on the Problems of the North Caucasus, a member of the Committee on Local Self-Government).

Zavgayev had also served as a Member of the Federation Council of Chechnya on executive authority.

He is the brother of Doku Zavgayev, a Chechen party functionary during the Soviet period.

== Biography ==
Akhmar Zavgayev was born on 20 December 1947 at the Nurinskaya station in the Tokarevka settlement of the Telman District of the Karaganda Region of the Kazakh SSR. From 1965 to 1971, he worked as a tractor driver, foreman of the tractor-field farming brigade. From 1971 to 1974 he was the chairman of the working committee of a state farm. In 1973, he graduated from the Sernovodsk Agricultural College. From 1974 to 1980 he was the chief engineer of a state farm. In 1979, he graduated from the Gorsky Agricultural Institute in Grozny. In 1980, he was the director of the state farm.

From 1995 to 1996, Zavgayev was the Deputy General Director of the Customs Service Center of the Association for Foreign Economic Cooperation of the Republic of Bashkortostan. From 1996 to 1997, he was an assistant to a member of the Federation Council. From 1997 to 1999, he was the General Director of CJSC Atomagroservice. On 24 October 2000, Zavgayev became a representative in the Federation Council from the executive authority of the Chechen Republic, and was the deputy chairman of the Federation Council Committee on Economic Policy, Entrepreneurship and Property.

On 7 December 2003, Zavgayev was elected to the State Duma of the fourth convocation from the Chechnya constituency N 32 (Chechen Republic). In December 2007, he was reelected as a member of the State Duma of the fifth convocation, and was elected as part of the federal list of candidates put forward by the United Russia party. He was a member of the Budget and Tax Committee.

== Political beliefs ==
Zavgaev condemned the statements of the German deputy in the Parliamentary Assembly of the Council of Europe (PACE) in Strasbourg, which, in his opinion, are an attempt to shift the responsibility for human rights violations in the Chechen Republic onto the Russian authorities. At the same time, he noted that the report of the German parliamentarian did not reflect the crimes of illegal armed groups: "These acts are committed by bandit groups led by Maskhadov, which pose the main threat to human rights in Chechnya." Zavgaev urged to unite efforts in the fight against terrorism.

Zavgaev also condemned the killings of Russian residents in Ingushetia in 2007, calling them an attempt "to destabilize the situation in the republic, to scare the Russian-speaking population."
