= 2007 Chechen constitutional referendum =

Referendum in Chechnya, Russia

- 2 December 2007

Do you accept the proposed amendments and revision of certain provisions of the Constitution of the Chechen Republic, adopted at the referendum on 23 March 2003, introduced by the President of the Chechen Republic?
Yes	96.88%
No	3.01%

Do you accept the proposal to invalidate the Law of the Chechen Republic "On Elections to the Parliament of the Chechen Republic," adopted at the referendum on 23 March 2003?
Yes	96.90%
No	2.99%

A constitutional referendum was held in the Russian republic of Chechnya on 2 December 2007, together with the Russian parliamentary elections. Among the changes proposed were:

- extension of the mandates of president from four to five years and of parliament from four to five years;
- removing restrictions on presidential terms
- adopting a unicameral parliament with 41 MPs (instead of the 58 MPs the lower house had up to that date);
- let future constitutional changes be decided by parliament.

The referendum succeeded with 85% of the vote in favour.

== Results ==
Question	For	Against	Invalid	Total	Registered voters	Turnout	Outcome
Constitutional amendments	553,161 (96.88%)	17,200 (3.01%)	640 (0.11%)	571,001	576,031	99.13%	Approved
Unicameral parliament	553,282 (96.90%)	17,055 (2.99%)	668 (0.11%)	571,005	576,031	99.13%	Approved

== See also ==
- Politics of Chechnya
