= Musa Umarov =

Russian jurist and politician (1953–2022)

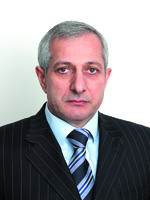
- Umarov in 2004

Russian Federation Senator from the Chechen Republic
- In office 11 December 2003 – 26 November 2008
- Preceded by: Adnan Muzykayev
- Succeeded by: Ziyad Sabsabi

Member of the Parliament of the Chechen Republic
- In office June 1996 – May 1998

Personal details
- Born: Musa Nazhmudinovich Umarov; 3 July 1953 Sarykemer, Zhambyl Region, Kazakh SSR, Soviet Union
- Died: 7 May 2022 (aged 68) Moscow, Russia
- Party: CPSU (until 1991)
- Education: Nizhny Novgorod Academy of Ministry of Internal Affairs of Russia; Academy of Management of the Ministry of Internal Affairs of Russia; Udmurt State University
- Occupation: Jurist

Musa Nazhmudinovich Umarov (Russian: Муса́ Нажмуди́нович Ума́ров; 3 July 1953 – 7 May 2022) was a Russian politician. He represented the Parliament of the Chechen Republic in the Federation Council from 2003 to 2008. He died in Moscow on 7 May 2022 at the age of 68.
