= Ziyad Sabsabi =

Syrian-Russian politician

- Зияд Сабсаби زياد سبسبي
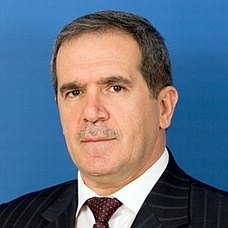

Russian Federation Senator from the Chechen Republic
- In office 26 November 2008 – 6 November 2019
- Preceded by: Musa Umarov
- Succeeded by: Mokhmad Akhmadov

Deputy Chairman of the Government of the Chechen Republic - Plenipotentiary Representative of the Chechen Republic under the President of Russia
- In office July 2004 – 26 November 2008

Deputy Prime Minister - Head of the Office of the President and Government of Chechnya
- In office November 2003 – July 2004

Head of the Office of the President and Government of Chechnya
- In office October 2003 – November 2003

Personal details
- Born: Ziyad Mukhamedovich Sabsabi; 19 July 1964 (age 60); Aleppo, Syria
- Political party: United Russia

Ziyad Mukhamedovich Sabsabi (Russian: Зияд Мухамедович Сабсаби, Arabic: زياد محمدوفيتش سبسبي; born 1 February 1964), is a Syrian-Russian politician who served as a Member of the Federation Council from the legislative authority of the Chechen Republic from 2008 to 2019.

He was an authorized representative of the Chechen Republic under the President of Russia from 2004 to 2008.

== Biography ==
Ziyad Sabsabi was born on 1 February 1964 in Aleppo. He graduated from the Damascus University and the Faculty of International Journalism of the Leningrad State University. He came to Chechnya in 1989, and in 1991 he received Russian citizenship.

From 1991 to 1994, Sabsabi worked at the Ministry of Foreign Affairs of the Chechen Republic of Ichkeria, and headed the department for external relations.

From 1994 to 1997 he was engaged in entrepreneurial activity.

In 1997, he returned to the power structures of the Chechen Republic of Ichkeria, as he served as an adviser on external relations to the Mufti of Chechnya, and later - to the head of the Chechen administration Akhmat Kadyrov, where he worked in the department for external relations of the Moscow representative office of the Chechen Republic.

In October 2003, he was appointed head of the Office of the President and Government of Chechnya, in November of the same year - Deputy Prime Minister - Head of the Office of the President and Government of Chechnya.

In April 2004, the vice-premier posts in the Government of Chechnya were abolished, but already in May, by the decree of Ramzan Kadyrov, Sabsabi, along with a number of officials, was returned to the vice-premier status.

In December 2007, he ran for elections to the State Duma of the 5th convocation from the Chechen Republic.

On 26 November 2008, Sabsabi became the Member of the Federation Council from the legislative authority of the Chechen Republic.

On 6 November 2019, the Federation Council terminated Sabsabi's powers ahead of schedule at his request, and was replaced by his successor, Mokhmad Akhmadov.
