= Aslambek Aslakhanov =

Russian general (1942–2024)

- Асламбек Аслаханов
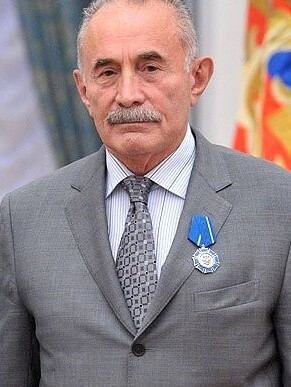
- Aslakhanov in 2012

Senator from Chechnya
- In office July 11, 2008 – May 2012

Personal details
- Born: 11 March 1942 Novye Atagi, Shalinsky District, Checheno-Ingush ASSR, Russian SFSR, USSR
- Died: 11 August 2024 (aged 82)
- Party: Independent
- Education: H.S. Skovoroda Kharkiv National Pedagogical University

Military service
- Rank: Police General

Aslambek Akhmedovich Aslakhanov (Russian: Асламбек Ахметович Аслаханов; 11 March 1942 – 11 August 2024) was a Russian general and politician who served as a State Duma deputy from Chechnya. He was an advisor and aide to Russian President Vladimir Putin.

Aslakhanov was a General of the MVD. He died on 11 August 2024, at the age of 82.
