= List of political parties in Chechnya =

This is a list of political parties in Chechnya, both past and present. It does not include independents.

== Active parties ==
Active parties in Chechnya
Party logo	Party	Founded	Main ideology
	United Russia	1 December 2001	Russian conservatism
	A Just Russia	28 October 2006	Social democracy
	Communist Party of the Russian Federation	14 February 1993	Marxism–Leninism

== Historical parties ==
Party logo	Party	Founded	Dissolved	Main ideology
	Communist Party of the Checheno-Ingush Autonomous Soviet Socialist Republic	15 January 1934	16 May 1992	Marxism–Leninism
	Public Association "Unity"	July 1989	5 May 1990	Chechen nationalism
	Vainakh Democratic Party	5 May 1990	1993	Chechen nationalism
	Islamic Renaissance Party	1990	1994	Islamism
	Islamic Way	1990	1993	Islamism
	Green Movement			Chechen nationalism
	Caucasus Society			Chechen nationalism
	All-National Congress of the Chechen People	9 June 1991	22 April 1996	Chechen nationalism
	Niiso	May 1994	March 1995	Pro-Russia
	National Independence Party			Chechen nationalism
	Union of Political Forces "Islamic Order"			Islamism
	Adat People's Movement	April 2020	11 July 2022 (banned, not dissolved)	Chechen nationalism
