= 1995 Shali cluster bomb attack =

1995 airstrike in Chechnya, Russia

- Location: Shali, Chechnya
- Date: 3 January 1995
- Target: Market, hospital, cemetery, school, collective farm
- Attack type: Cluster bombing
- Deaths: 55–100+
- Injuries: At least 168
- Perpetrator: Russian Air Force

The 1995 Shali cluster bomb attack was an attack which occurred on 3 January 1995, when Russian fighter jets bombed the Chechen town of Shali with cluster bombs.

== Events ==
Eighteen cluster bombs were reportedly dropped in and around Shali on that day in several runs. The bombs hit a roadside market first, followed by a gas station, and a hospital, in which civilians, as well as Russian prisoners of war, were being treated. The aircraft then went on to strafe a Muslim cemetery. A school and a collective farm were also targeted.

At least 55 people were killed (including five medical workers) and 186 people were wounded. An estimate by the Russian presidential human rights office put the number of killed at over 100. No military targets were reported in the area at the time of the attack.

Boris Yeltsin's office announced a halt to air raids on Grozny, but the statement did not rule out the use of heavy artillery, which caused damage to civilian targets. The military's tactics raised concerns over civilian casualties, causing protests in Russia and drawing criticism from Western governments.
