= Shaid Zhamaldayev =

Chechen politician (born 1954)

- Шаид Жамалдаев
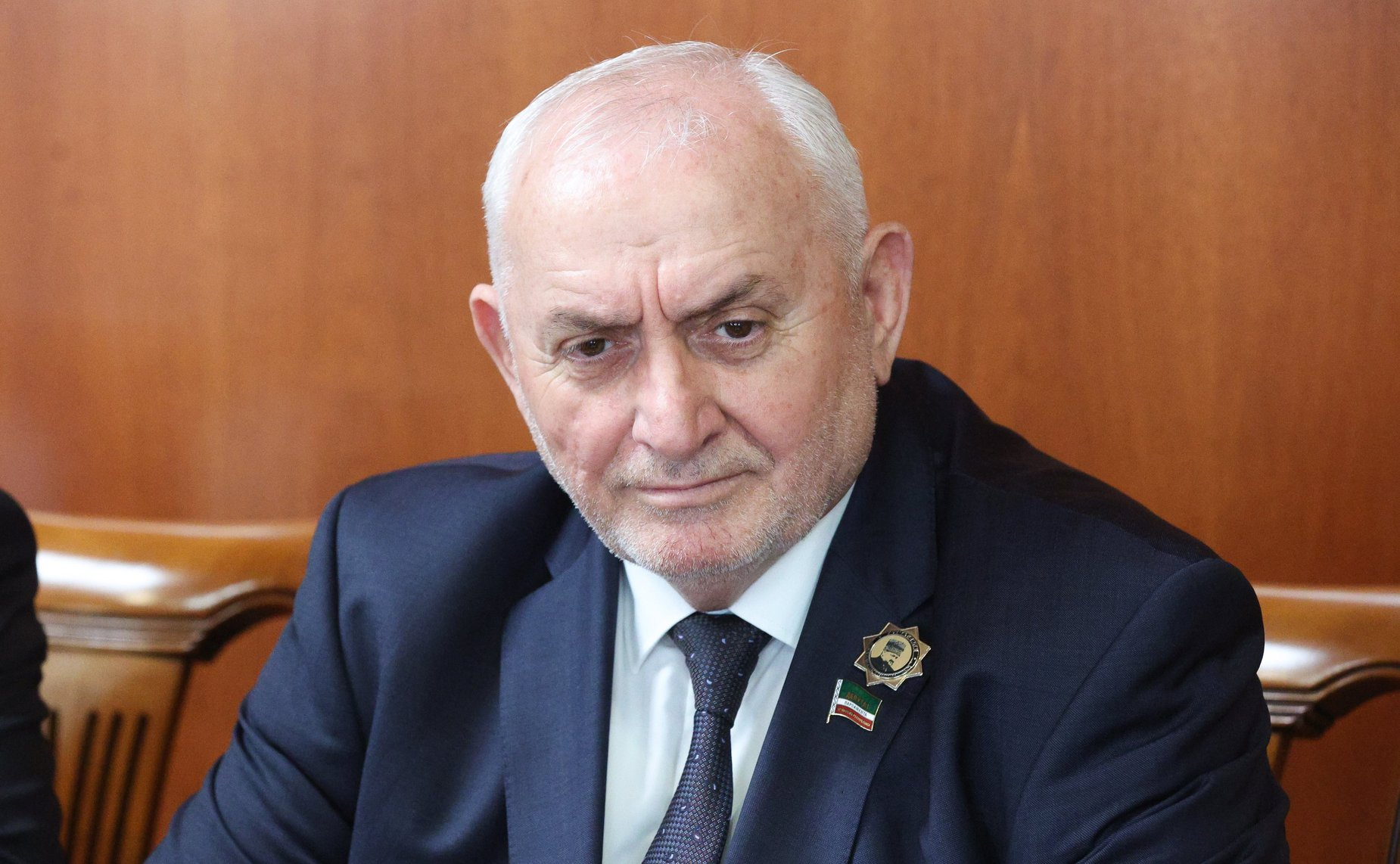
- Zhamaldayev in 2025

Chairman of the Chechen Parliament
- In office 15 May 2024 – 4 October 2026
- Preceded by: Magomed Daudov
- Succeeded by: Akhmed Dudayev

Member of the Chechen Parliament
- Incumbent
- Assumed office 18 September 2016

Personal details
- Born: 8 July 1954 (age 72) Oktyabrskoye, Konyukhovo District, North Kazakhstan Region, Kazakh SSR, Soviet Union
- Party: United Russia

Military service
- Allegiance: Soviet Union
- Branch/service: Soviet Army
- Years of service: 1978–1979

Shaid Vakhayevich Zhamaldayev (Russian: Шаид Вахаевич Жамалдаев, born 8 July 1954) is a Russian politician, who is the chairman of the Parliament of the Chechen Republic since May 2024 and Member of the Parliament since 2016.

Before his chairmanship, Zhamaldayev was the Chechen Minister for National Policy, External Relations, Press and Information (2013–2015) and Deputy Chairman (2016–2024).

== Biography ==
=== Early life and education ===
Zhamaldayev was born on 8 July 1954, in the now-disbanded Konyukhovo District of the North Kazakhstan Region, in Soviet Kazakhstan. In 1978, he became an agronome at the Gorsky State University of Agriculture.

=== Career and military service ===
From March 1978 to April 1978 he was an agrochemist at the Chechen-Ingush Republican Agrochemical Laboratory, and in 1978–1979 he served in the Soviet Army. In December 1979, he returned to the Chechen-Ingush Republican Agrochemical Laboratory as a senior agronomist-agrochemist. From October 1985 to February 1991, Shaid Zhamaldayev was the released secretary of the party committee of the Goryacheistochnensky state farm. From 1991 to 2000, he was the chairman of the Chantiyurt collective farm.

=== Political career ===
In the years from 2000 to 2009, he headed the administration of the Groznensky District of the Chechen Republic. In January 2010, he was elected head of the administration of the Groznensky municipal district.

In May 2013, he was appointed assistant to the President of Chechnya. In the years from 2013 to 2015 Zhamaldayev was the Minister of the Chechen Republic for National Policy, External Relations, Press and Information.

On September 18, 2016, he was elected as a Member of the Parliament of the Chechen Republic of the fourth convocation. On October 4, 2016, at its first meeting, he was elected deputy chairman.

==== Chairman of the Parliament ====
On May 15, 2024, he was elected Chairman of the Parliament of the Chechen Republic after the resignation of Magomed Daudov. Called "the comrade-in-arms of Akhmat Kadyrov", Zhamaldayev was referred to as a trusted, dear individual by Ramzan Kadyrov.

== Awards, titles and decorations ==
Shaid Zhamaldayev's awards and titles include:

- Order of Friendship;
- Order of Akhmad Kadyrov;
- Honorary citizen of the Chechen Republic.
