= Parliament of the Chechen Republic of Ichkeria =

Exiled legislative body

Parliament of Chechen Republic of Ichkeria

Type
- Type: Unicameral

History
- Founded: 1991
- Disbanded: 2007
- Preceded by: Supreme Soviet of the Checheno-Ingush SSR
- Succeeded by: Parliament of the Chechen Republic

Leadership
- Speakers: Zhalaudi Saralyapov since March 2005

Structure
- Seats: 63
- Political groups: National Independence Party (20); Islamic Order (7); Independents (29); Vacant (7)

Elections
- First election: 27 October 1991
- Last election: 27 January 1997

The Parliament of Chechen Republic of Ichkeria was the legislative body of Chechen Republic of Ichkeria. The last elections for the 63 seats took place in 1997. The Parliament has been in exile since the Second Chechen War.

== Speakers ==
Name	Term started	Term ended	Notes
Hussein Ahmadov	2 November 1991	17 April 1993	ru:Хусейн Ахмадов
Yusup Soslambekov	2 May 1993	4 June 1993	ru:Сосламбеков, Юсуп Эдилбекович
Akhyad Idigov	22 June 1993	17 March 1997	ru:Ахъяд Идигов
Ruslan Alikhadzhiyev	17 March 1997	May 2000	Kidnapped
Isa Temirov	May 2000	June 2000	Acting
Dardail Khiryayev	June 2000	26 October 2003	Died in office
Selim Bishayev	October 2003	December 2003	Acting
Ibrahim Akhmatov	December 2003	March 2005	
Zhalaudi Saralyapov	March 2005	Incumbent	

== Last election ==
The elections were held at 27 January and 15 February 1997.

Party	Seats
National Independence Party	20
Islamic Order	7
Independents	29
Vacant	7
Total	63
