= Willi Kronhardt =

German footballer (born 1969)

Personal information
- Date of birth: 17 February 1969 (age 57)
- Place of birth: Tokarevka, Kazakh SSR, Soviet Union
- Height: 1.77 m (5 ft 10 in)
- Position: Defender

Senior career*
Years	Team	Apps	(Gls)
–1990	ASC Nienburg		
1990–1991	TSV Havelse	32	(2)
1991–1993	Fortuna Köln	18	(0)
1993–1994	TSV Havelse		
1994–1996	Eintracht Braunschweig	52	(8)
1996–1998	Energie Cottbus	18	(0)
1998–2000	VfB Leipzig	41	(2)
2000–2001	Tennis Borussia Berlin	19	(1)
2001	SV Arminia Hannover		
2002	TSV Havelse		
Total		180	(13)

Managerial career
- 2005–2006: Eintracht Braunschweig (assistant)
- 2006: Eintracht Braunschweig
- 2007: VfL Wolfsburg II
- 2009: Alemannia Aachen
- 2010–2011: Al-Merrikh
- 2012: 1. FC Lokomotive Leipzig
- 2012–2014: Germania Halberstadt
- 2014–2015: SV Elversberg
- * Club domestic league appearances and goals

Willi Kronhardt (born 17 February 1969) is a German football manager and former player.

A defender, Kronhardt made 68 appearances in the 2. Bundesliga during his playing career. Born in Tokarevka, Kazakh SSR, Soviet Union, moved to (West) Germany aged 8 and has lived there ever since.
