= National Independence Party (Chechnya) =

Political party in the Chechen Republic of Ichkeria

National Independence Party Партия национальной независимости
- Leader: Ruslan Kutayev
- President: Aslan Maskhadov
- Founded: 27 May 1993
- Ideology: Conservatism; Mixed economy; Anti-corruption
- Colors: Blue
- Parliament: 20 / 63

The National Independence Party (Russian: Партия национальной независимости, romanized: Partiya natsionalnoy nezavisimosti; abbreviated PNN) was a political party in the Chechen Republic of Ichkeria led by human rights activist and businessman Ruslan Kutayev. Initially opposed to the government of Dzhokhar Dudayev, the party later shifted in support of him following the beginning of the First Chechen War, and later achieved landslide victories during the 1997 Chechen presidential election.

== History ==
The National Independence Party was founded on 27 May 1993, on the initiative of the Congress of Entrepreneurs of Chechnya. At the time of his election as the party's leader, Kutayev was head of the Kavkaz concern. Said-Magomed Satuyev was selected as the party's second leader in a 1993–1994 congress. The party's programme listed its main positions as support for Chechen traditions, streamlining of government, and a "rational" mixed economy. It criticised Chechen President Dzhokhar Dudayev, accusing him of corruption, and led an October 1993 assembly of teips and ethnic minorities demanding an end to government pressure on the press and calling for new parliamentary elections.

In response to the congress, Chechen authorities launched an effort to crack down on the party; the Prosecutor General's office ordered a raid on the party's headquarters, alleging corruption in its ranks. The party was supported by Chechen volunteers of the Confederation of Mountain Peoples of the Caucasus who had fought in the War in Abkhazia. The latter group demanded economic reforms, the removal of allegedly corrupt officials, and the appointment of petroleum executive Adam Albakov as Prime Minister of Ichkeria.

Following the beginning of the First Chechen War, the party was initially disbanded before being re-established in the summer of 1995. Following its re-establishment, the party grew to be among the strongest supporters of Dudayev and Chechen independence, and alongside the pro-Dudayev Assembly of Parties and the General Staff of the Armed Forces of the Chechen Republic of Ichkeria, formed a concordat to jointly support Chechnya and Chechen citizens for the duration of the war.

The PNN's support for Dudayev during the war led to a significant upswing in its support following the 1996 Khasavyurt Accord that brought the conflict to an end. The party's ticket in the 1997 Chechen presidential election was headed by incumbent Prime Minister Aslan Maskhadov and field commander Vakha Arsanov. The ticket was described by Radio Free Europe/Radio Liberty as being "widely regarded as the most moderate", and backed by both supporters of Chechen independence and its opponents. In the presidential election, it won an overwhelming victory with between 59.3% and 64.8% of the vote. The parliamentary election, held the same day, was equally bountiful for the PNN, with either 20 deputies (as claimed by political scientist Timur Muzayev) or 65% (as claimed by Kutayev) of all deputies elected being members of the party. The Speaker of the Chechen Parliament, Ruslan Alikhadzhiyev, was also a member of the party.

Following the election, however, the coalition between Maskhadov and Arsanov began to collapse, owing to, among other things, Maskhadov's signing of the Russia–Chechnya Peace Treaty and perceived lack of authority on the one hand, and Arsanov's de facto control over the country and perceived erratic anti-Russian behaviours on the other hand. In opposition to both Maskhadov and Arsanov were several other field commanders who were supportive of sharia. By February 1999, the situation had reached a boiling point, as Islamist field commanders established their own government in opposition to that of Maskhadov and Arsanov.

The PNN was at its strongest in the Achkhoy-Martanovsky and Urus-Martanovsky districts, where it allegedly organised a paramilitary composed of the party's supporters. It was primarily supported by members of the minor teips who had made profits in Russia during the First Chechen War. During the Second Chechen War, its leadership, including Maskhadov, Arsanov, and Alikhadzhiyev were killed. Kutayev was later arrested by the government of Ramzan Kadyrov before being released in 2017.

== Electoral results ==
=== Parliamentary ===
Year	Votes	%	Position	Seats won	+/-	Government
1997	Unknown	65%	▲1st	20 / 63	▲20	Government

=== Presidential ===
Year	Candidate	First round			Result
Year	Candidate	Votes	%	Rank	Result
1997	Aslan Maskhadov	241,950	59.3% (Note: According to the Central Electoral Commission of the Chechen Republic of Ichkeria.)	1st	Won
