= Ghabiden Mustafin =

Ghabiden Mustafin Ғабиден Мұстафин
- Town
- Location within Kazakhstan
- Coordinates: 50°07′09″N 73°09′56″E
- Country: Kazakhstan
- Region: Karaganda Region
- Elevation: 483 m (1,585 ft)

Population (1 January 2010)
  - Total: 3,997
- Time zone: UTC+6 (East)
  - Summer (DST): UTC+6 (not observed)
- Area codes: +7 (72138)

Ghabiden Mustafin (Kazakh: Ғабиден Мұстафин, Ğabiden Mūstafin), previously until 2002 Tokarevka (Russian: Токаревка), is a town in Karaganda Region, Kazakhstan, with a population of 3,997.

Tokarevka lies upon the Nura River, some 30 km (19 miles) north of the provincial capital, Karaganda.

Willi Kronhardt is a German football manager and former player born 17 February 1969 in Tokarevka.
