= 2021 Chechen general election =

- 17–19 September 2021
- Turnout: 94.61%
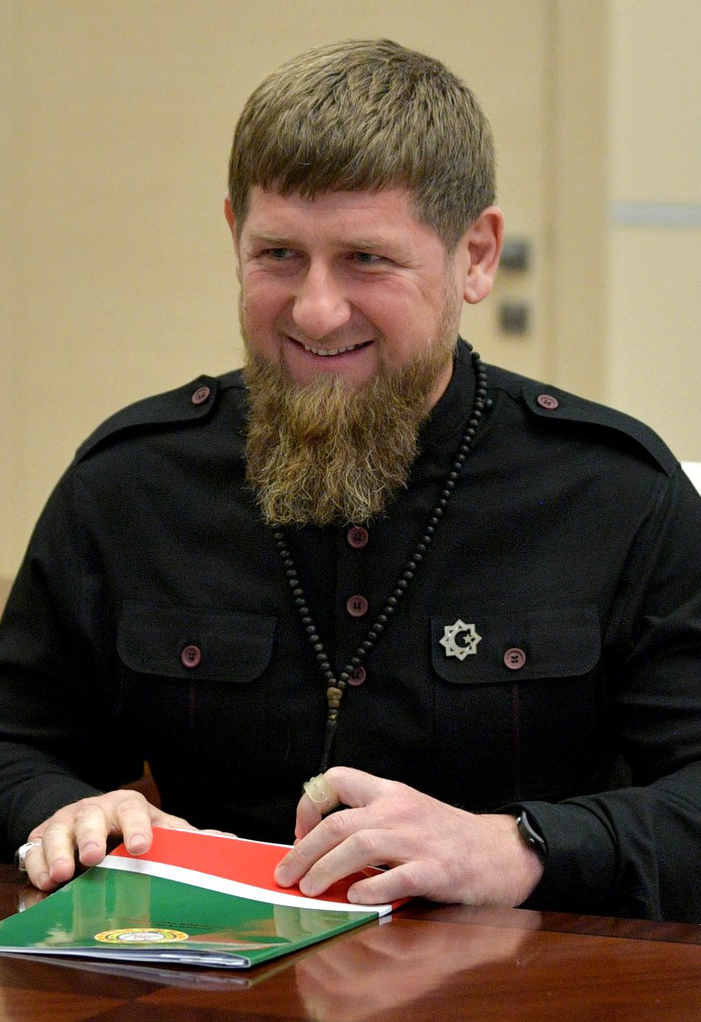

Candidate	Ramzan Kadyrov	Isa Khadzhimuradov
Party	United Russia	SRZP
Popular vote	711,973	1,064
Percentage	99.73%	0.15%
- Results by district Kadyrov: 90–100%
Head before election
Ramzan Kadyrov
United Russia
Elected Head
Ramzan Kadyrov
United Russia

The 2021 Chechen Republic general election took place on 17–19 September 2021 alongside national parliamentary elections. Incumbent Head Ramzan Kadyrov was re-elected for his fourth term.

== Background ==
Ramzan Kadyrov was first appointed as President of the Chechen Republic in 2007 and later was re-appointed in 2011. In 2016, Kadyrov ran in his first head election and won it with 97.94% of the vote. Since the retirements of governors Yevgeny Savchenko of Belgorod Oblast in September 2020 and Sergey Morozov of Ulyanovsk Oblast in April 2021, Kadyrov became the longest serving head of a Russian region. On 24 June 2021, President Vladimir Putin endorsed Ramzan Kadyrov for re-election and 3 days later Kadyrov announced his candidacy for head election.

== Candidates ==
Only political parties can nominate candidates for head election in Chechnya, self-nomination is not possible. However, candidates are not obliged to be members of their nominating party. Candidates for Head of the Chechen Republic should be Russian citizens and at least 30 years old. Candidates for Head should not have a foreign citizenship or residence permit. Each candidate in order to be registered is required to collect at least 7% of signatures of members and heads of municipalities (179-187 signatures). Also head candidates present 3 candidacies to the Federation Council and the election winner later appoints one of the presented candidates.

The Liberal Democratic Party declined to nominate a candidate in head election.

=== Registered candidates ===
- Ramzan Kadyrov (United Russia), incumbent Head of the Chechen Republic
- Isa Khadzhimuradov (A Just Russia — For Truth), former mayor of Grozny (2020-2021)
- Khalid Nakaev (Communist Party of the Russian Federation), Member of Parliament of the Chechen Republic

== Results ==
=== Head of the Chechen Republic ===
Candidate	Party	Votes	%
Ramzan Kadyrov	United Russia	711,973	99.73
Isa Khadzhimuradov	A Just Russia – For Truth	1,064	0.15
Khalid Nakaev	Communist Party	835	0.12
Total		713,872	100.00
Valid votes		713,872	99.97
Invalid/blank votes		237	0.03
Total votes		714,109	100.00
Registered voters/turnout		754,790	94.61
Source: CEC

=== Parliament of the Chechen Republic ===
Party	Votes	%	Seats
United Russia	636,974	89.25	37
A Just Russia – For Truth	39,884	5.59	2
Communist Party	36,828	5.16	2
Total	713,686	100.00	41
Valid votes	713,686	99.94	
Invalid/blank votes	423	0.06	
Total votes	714,109	100.00	
Registered voters/turnout	754,790	94.61	
