= Constitution of Chechnya =

Supreme law of Chechnya

The Constitution of the Chechen Republic (Chechen: Нохчийн Республикин Конституци, romanized: Noxçiyn Respublikin Konstituci; Russian: Конституция Чеченской Республики) is the basic law of the Chechen Republic, Russia. It was adopted on 23 March 2003 in a referendum.

== Background ==
The Constitution of the Chechen Republic was adopted on 23 March 2003. Changes in the Constitution of the Chechen Republic affect a number of articles of the Law of the Republic, the Chechen Republic concerning the presidential elections, the term of office of the President and Parliament, as well as the provisions of the legislative bodies. It was planned to increase the terms of office of the president and members of parliament of the Chechen Republic from four to five years.

== Overview ==
It Consists of:

- Preamble
- 2 sections
- 9 chapters
- 112 articles

=== Amendments ===
The need to amend and revise certain provisions of the Constitution of the Chechen Republic arose from the fact that since the adoption in March 2003 referendum on the Constitution of the Chechen Republic in the federal legislation has been a change in the matters relating to the election of the heads of subjects of the Russian Federation and some other laws. The main task was to bring the Constitution of the Chechen Republic in accordance with the basic law of the Russian Federation.
