= Suleiman Geremeyev =

Russian politician (born 1971)

- Сулейман Геремеев
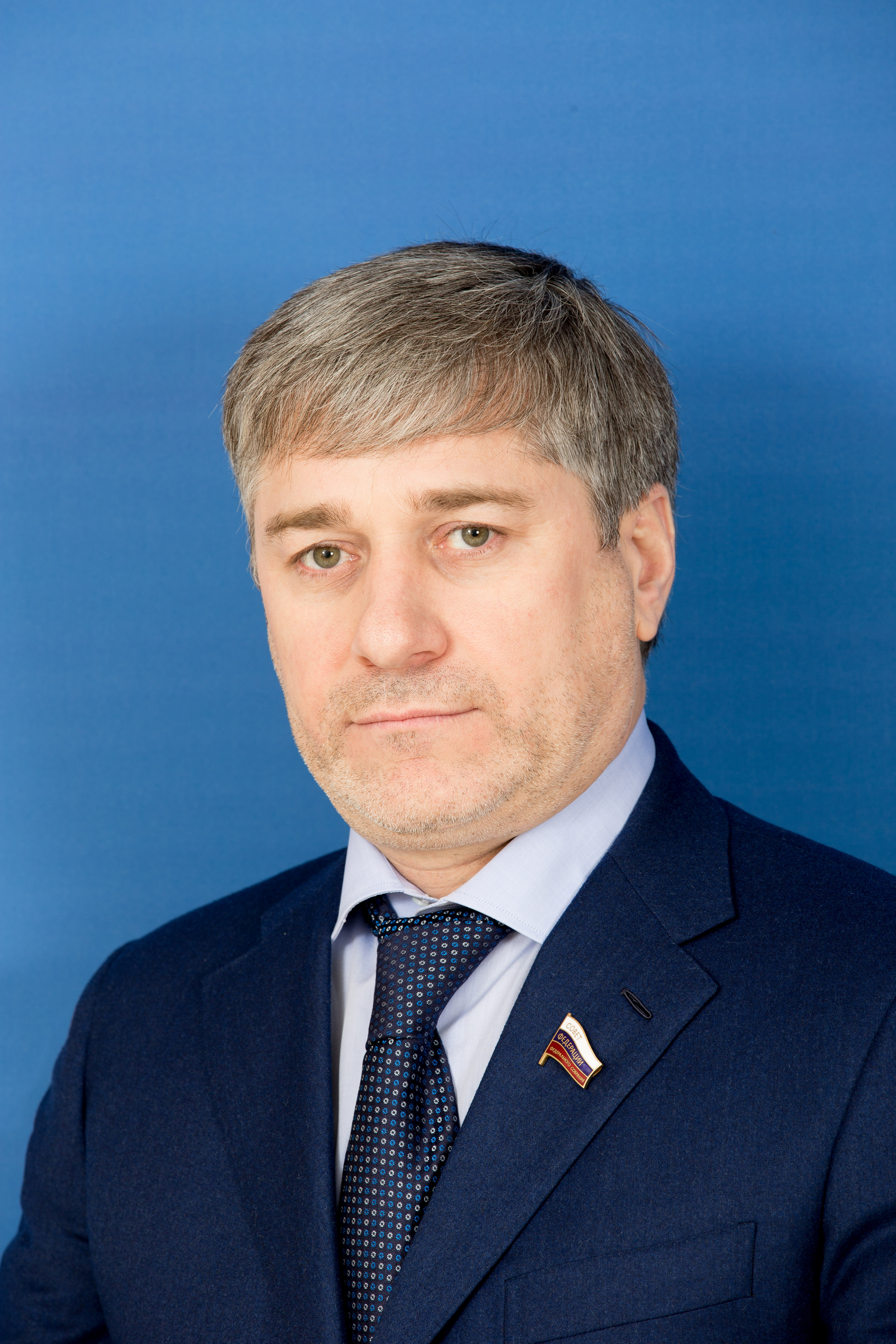

Senator from Chechnya
- Incumbent
- Assumed office 11 June 2011
- Preceded by: Umar Dzhabrailov

Personal details
- Born: Suleiman Geremeyev; 20 January 1971 (age 55) Grozny, Russian Soviet Federative Socialist Republic, Soviet Union
- Party: United Russia
- Education: Chechen State University

Suleiman Sadulayevich Geremeyev (Russian: Сулейман Садулаевич Геремеев; born 20 January 1971) is a Russian politician serving as a senator from Chechnya since 11 June 2011.

== Career ==
Suleiman Geremeyev was born on 20 January 1971 in Grozny. In 1996, he graduated from the Chechen State University. In 2013, he also obtained a degree from the Russian Presidential Academy of National Economy and Public Administration. From 2000 to 2003, during the Second Chechen War, he commanded the militia in the Gudermessky District of the republic. He was in the close circle of Akhmad Kadyrov. After the war, he was appointed advisor to Ramzan Kadyrov to coordinate work with federal structures. On 11 June 2011 he was appointed senator from Chechnya. In 2021, he was re-appointed for the same position.

== Awards ==
- Medal of the Order "For Merit to the Fatherland" II class — awarded by presidential decree of Vladimir Putin on February 27, 2020, “for significant contribution to the development of parliamentarism and active legislative work.” Notably, the last bill submitted by Geremeyev as co-author had been introduced in October 2015, and all seven bills in which he participated since 2012 failed to pass the first reading, having been either rejected or returned to the initiator. Presidential press secretary Dmitry Peskov stated that the number of legislative initiatives is hardly a definitive criterion, as a senator may take an active role in developing initiatives that are subsequently introduced by other senators. According to Peskov, a legislator’s activity should not be judged solely by the number of bills submitted. The decree was issued on the fifth anniversary of the murder of Boris Nemtsov, a case in which Geremeyev was mentioned.
- Order of Kadyrov — April 7, 2011.

== Sanctions ==
Suleiman Geremeyev is under personal sanctions introduced by the European Union, the United Kingdom, the United States, Canada, Switzerland, Australia, Ukraine, New Zealand, for ratifying the decisions of the "Treaty of Friendship, Cooperation and Mutual Assistance between the Russian Federation and the Donetsk People's Republic and between the Russian Federation and the Luhansk People's Republic" and providing political and economic support for Russia's annexation of Ukrainian territories.
