= Head of the Chechen Republic =

Highest-ranking official in Chechnya, Russia

- Мехкада Нохчийн Республика (Chechen); Глава Чеченской Республики (Russian)
- Standard of the head of the Chechen Republic

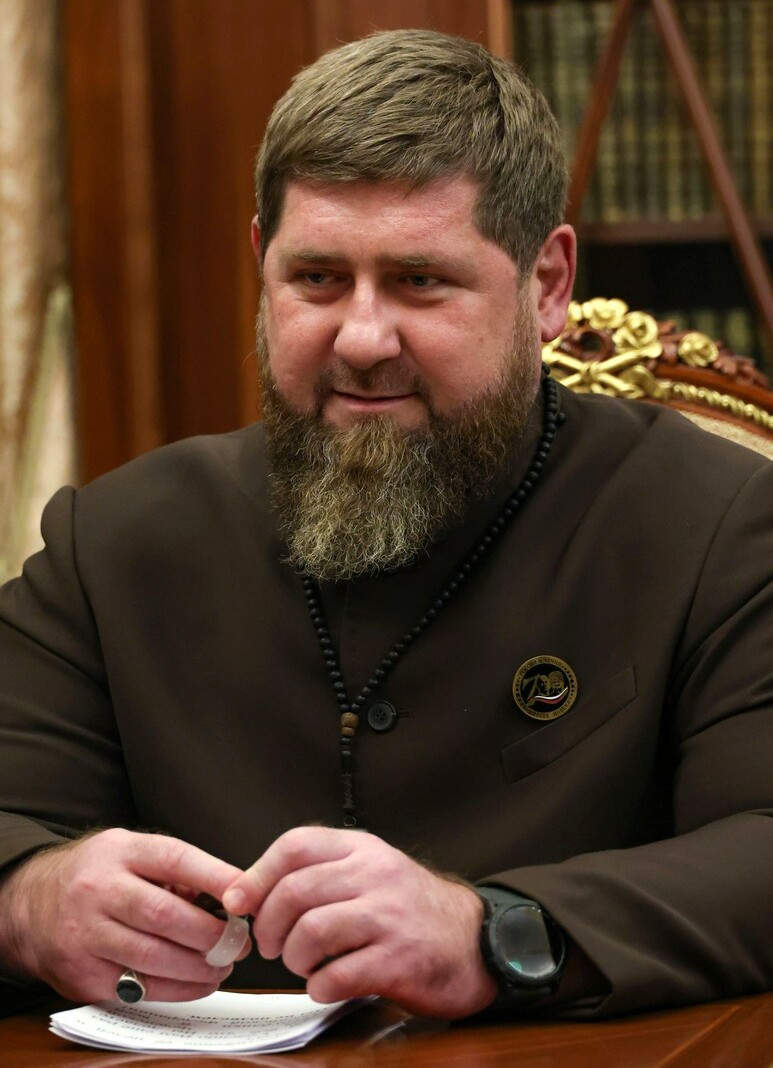
- Incumbent; Ramzan Kadyrov since 15 February 2007
- Executive Department of Chechen Republic
- Style: His Excellency (formal); Sir (informal)
- Type: Head of state Head of government
- Residence: Residence of the Head of Chechnya Grozny, Chechnya
- Nominator: Political parties
- Appointer: Popular vote
- Term length: Five years; renewable optional
- Constituting instrument: the Constitution
- Precursor: President of Ichkeria
- Formation: 5 October 2003
- First holder: Akhmad Kadyrov
- Salary: 80,000 $
- Website: chechnya.gov.ru

The head of the Chechen Republic or head of Chechnya (Chechen: Мехкада Нохчийн Республика, romanized: Mehkada Nohçiyn Respublika; Russian: Глава Чеченской Республики, romanized: Glava Chechenskoy Respubliki; formerly president of the Chechen Republic or president of Chechnya until 5 March 2011) is the highest office within the political system of the Chechen Republic, as head of state and head of government of Chechnya. The office was instituted in 2003 during the course of the Second Chechen War, when the Russian federal government regained control over the region and after a constitutional referendum approved the current Constitution of the Chechen Republic.

== Eligibility ==
According to the article 66 of the Constitution of the Chechen Republic, a citizen of Russia, no younger than thirty years old, may be elected Head. The term is for five years, with no limits on serving multiple terms (prior to the 2007 constitutional referendum the Head was elected for four years, with a two term limit). The Head is not allowed to be at the same time a deputy of the Parliament of the Chechen Republic, or deputy of a representative body of local self-government.

== Presidents and heads of the Chechen Republic ==
No.	Portrait	Name (Birth–Death)	Term of office			Party	Election
No.	Portrait	Name (Birth–Death)	Took office	Left office	Time in office	Party	Election
1		Akhmad Kadyrov (1951–2004)	19 October 2003	9 May 2004 (Assassinated)	203 days	Independent	2003
—		Sergey Abramov (born 1972)	9 May 2004	5 October 2004	149 days	Independent	– (Note: Acting president)
2		Alu Alkhanov (born 1957)	5 October 2004	15 February 2007	2 years, 133 days	Independent → United Russia	2004
—		Ramzan Kadyrov (born 1976)	15 February 2007	5 April 2007	19 years, 257 days	United Russia	–
3		Ramzan Kadyrov (born 1976)	5 April 2007	Incumbent	19 years, 257 days	United Russia	2007 (Note: Appointed by the president of Russia with the consent of the Parliament of Chechnya.); 2011; 2016; 2021; 2026

== Latest election ==
Candidate	Party	Votes	%
Ramzan Kadyrov	United Russia	711,973	99.73
Isa Khadzhimuradov	A Just Russia – For Truth	1,064	0.15
Khalid Nakaev	Communist Party	835	0.12
Total		713,872	100.00
Valid votes		713,872	99.97
Invalid/blank votes		237	0.03
Total votes		714,109	100.00
Registered voters/turnout		754,790	94.61
Source: CEC

== See also ==
- List of leaders of Communist Chechnya

== Sources ==
- World Statesmen.org
