= Shalinsky District, Chechnya =

Shalinsky District Шалинский район (Russian)
- District

Other transcription(s)
  - Chechen: Шелан кӏошт
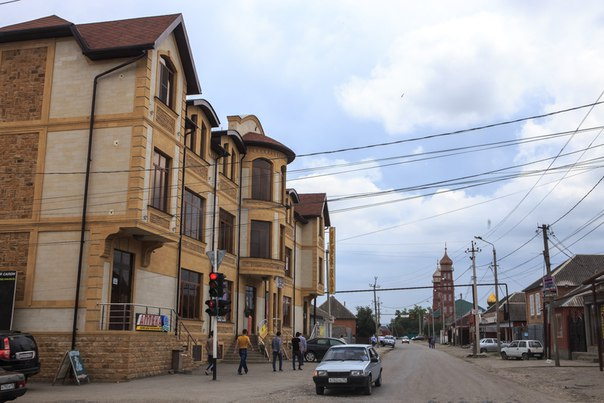
- Town of Shali, Shalinsky District

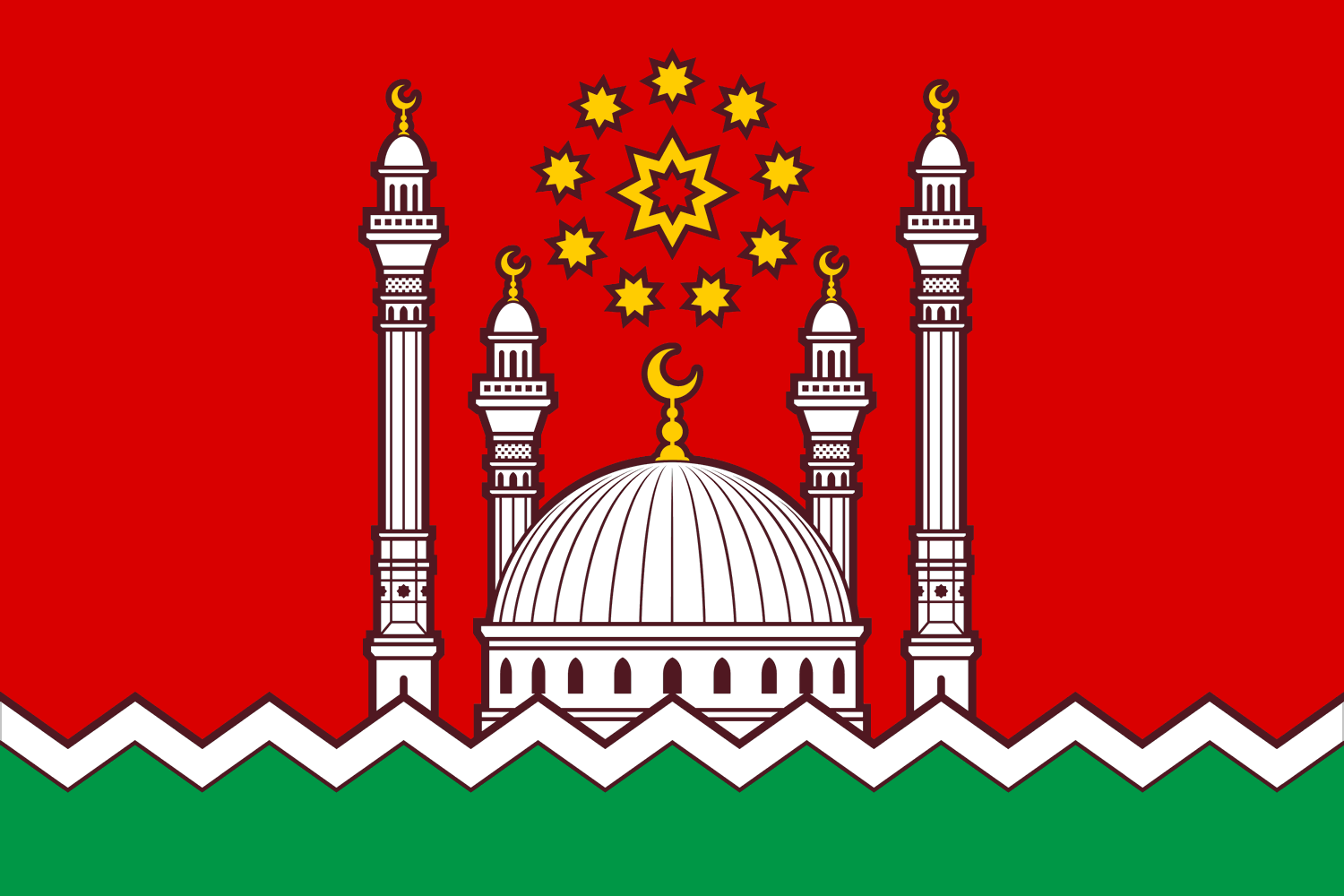
- Flag
- Location of Shalinsky District in the Chechen Republic
- Coordinates: 43°09′N 45°54′E
- Country: Russia
- Federal subject: Chechen Republic
- Established: 1920
- Administrative center: Shali

Area
  - Total: 700 km^{2} (270 sq mi)

Population (2010 Census)
  - Total: 115,970
  - Density: 170/km^{2} (430/sq mi)
  - Urban: 41.1%
  - Rural: 58.9%

Administrative structure
  - Administrative divisions: 1 Town administrations, 1 Urban-type settlements, 8 Rural administrations
  - Inhabited localities: 1 cities/towns, 1 urban-type settlements, 8 rural localities

Municipal structure
  - Municipally incorporated as: Shalinsky Municipal District
  - Municipal divisions: 1 urban settlements, 9 rural settlements
- Time zone: UTC+3 (MSK)
- OKTMO ID: 96637000
- Website: http://shalinsky.ru/

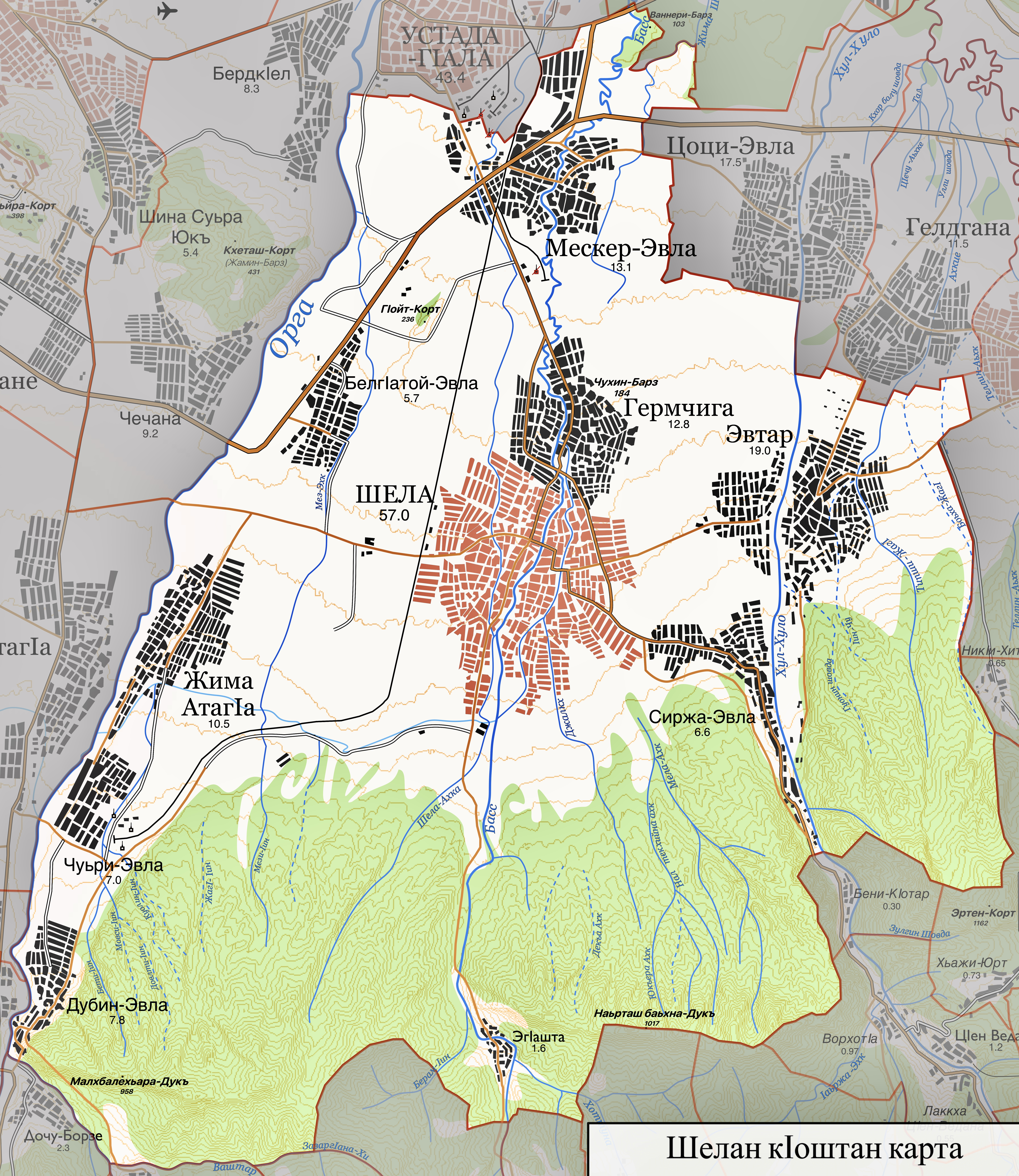
Map of the Shali District (in Chechen)

Shalinsky District (Russian: Шали́нский райо́н; Chechen: Шелан кӏошт, Şelan khoşt) is an administrative and municipal district (raion), one of the fifteen in the Chechen Republic, Russia. It is located in the center of the republic. The area of the district is 700 square kilometers (270 sq mi). Its administrative center is the town of Shali. Population: 115,970 (2010 census); 68,862 (2002 Census); 136,590 (1989 Soviet census). The population of Shali accounts for 41.1% of the district's total population.

== Healthcare ==
State health facilities in the district are represented by one central district hospital in Shali and one district hospital in Chiri-Yurt.
