= Shali, Chechen Republic =

Shali Шали
- Town

Other transcription(s)
  - Chechen: Шела
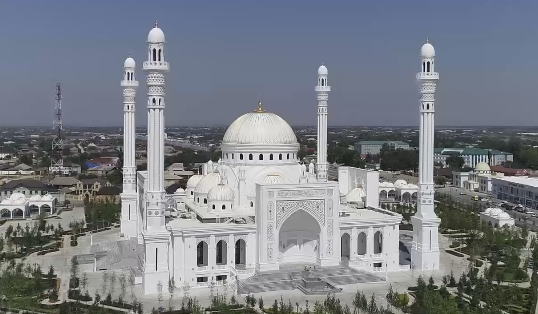
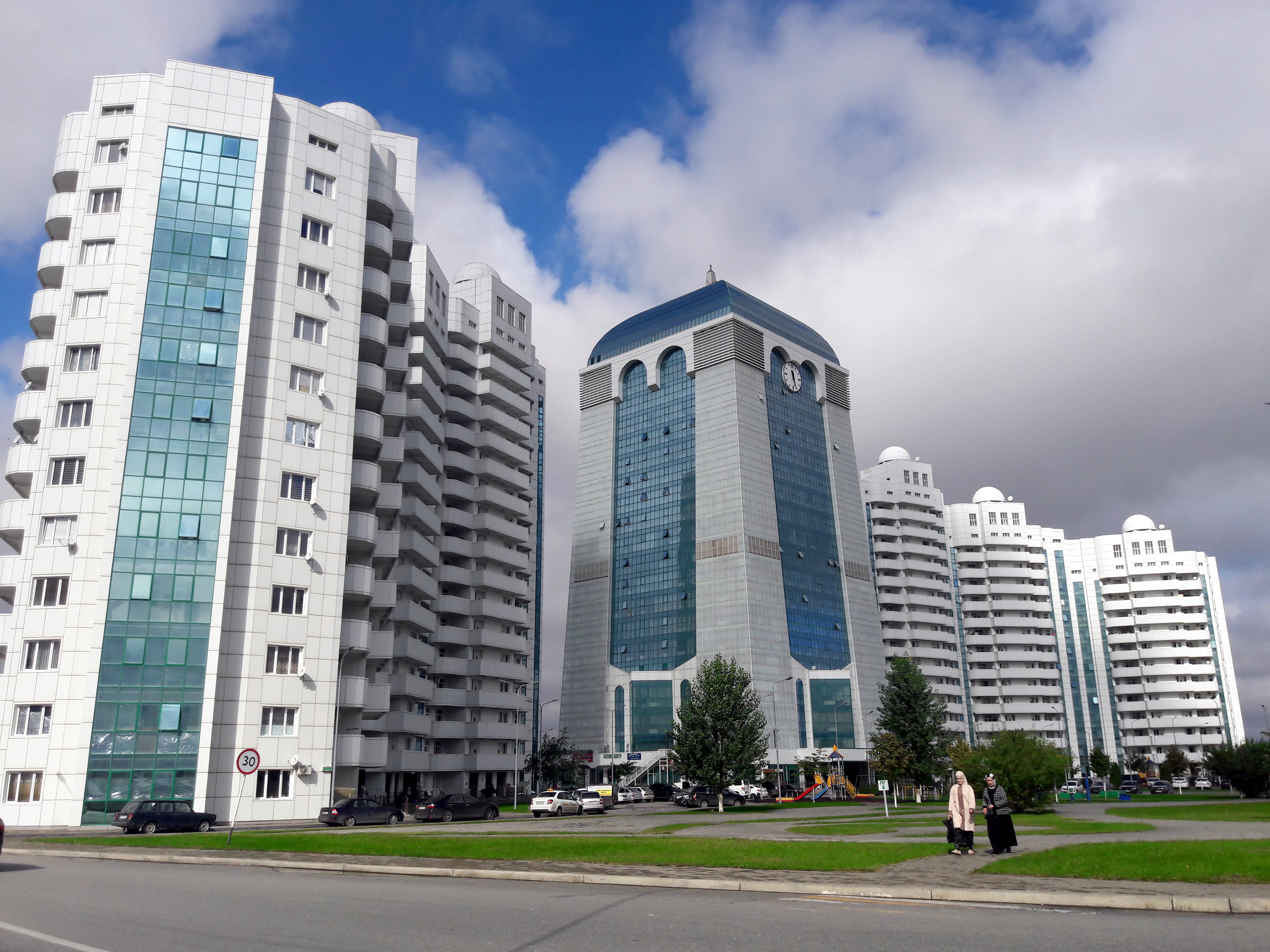
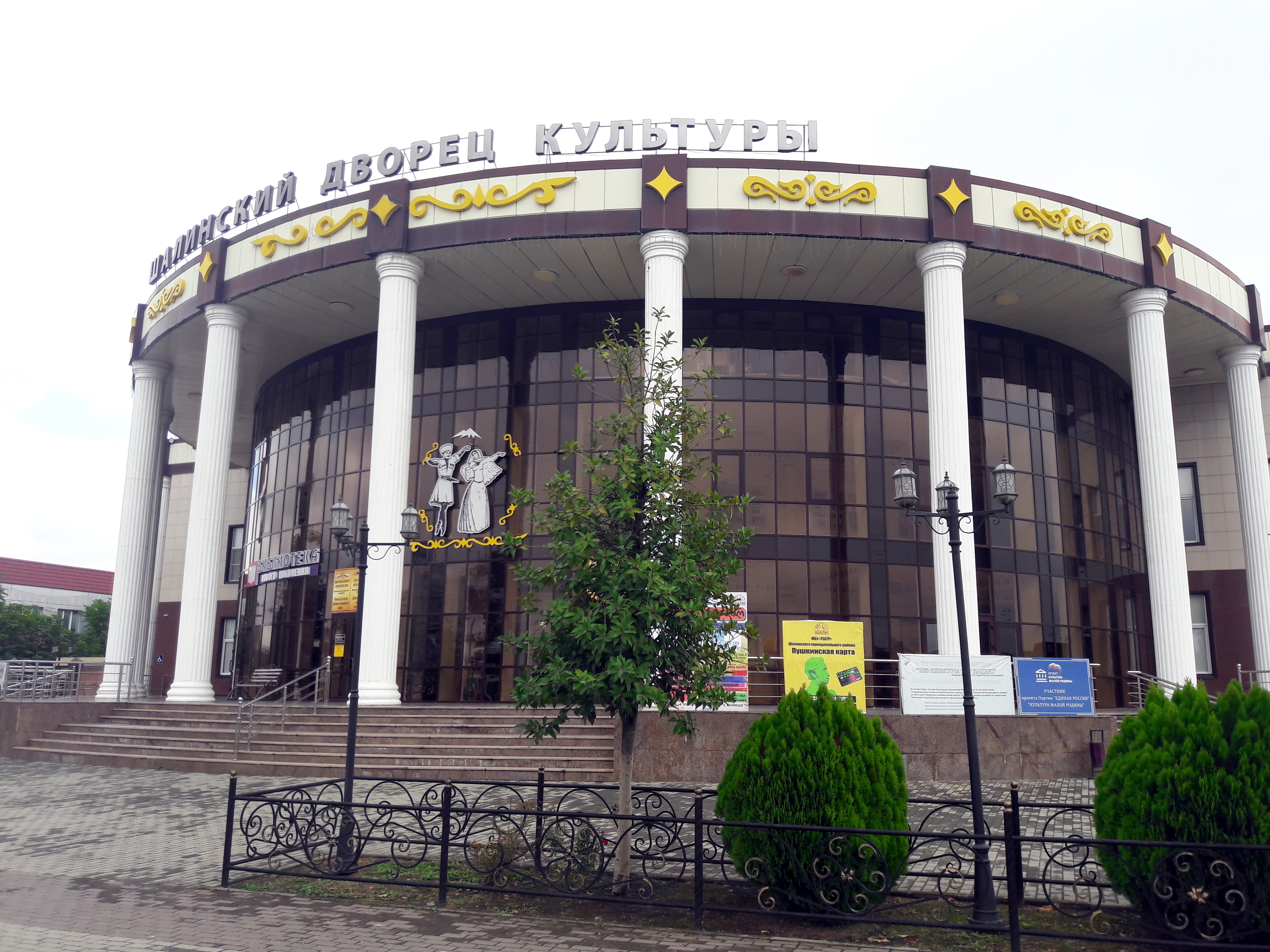
- From the top, Pride of Muslims Mosque, Shali Towers, Shali Palace of Culture Central Mosque of Shali
- Interactive map of Shali
- Location of Shali Shali (Chechnya)
- Coordinates: 43°09′N 45°54′E
- Country: Russia
- Federal subject: Chechnya
- Administrative district: Shalinsky District
- Town administrationSelsoviet: Shali
- Founded: 14th century (Julian)
- Elevation: 225 m (738 ft)

Population (2010 Census)
  - Total: 47,708
  - Estimate (2025): 55,225 (+15.8%)

Administrative status
  - Capital of: Shalinsky District, Shali Town Administration

Municipal status
  - Municipal district: Shalinsky Municipal District
  - Urban settlement: Shalinskoye Urban Settlement
  - Capital of: Shalinsky Municipal District, Shalinskoye Urban Settlement
- Time zone: UTC+3 (MSK)
- Postal code: 366300
- OKTMO ID: 96637101001

Shali (Russian: Шали́; Chechen: Шела, Şela) is a town and the administrative center of Shalinsky District of the Chechen Republic, Russia. Population: 47,708 (2010 census); 40,356 (2002 census); 24,985 (1989 Soviet census).

== History ==
Sheikh Mansur was based here in 1786.

=== Killed civilians during Chechen Wars (1994–2000) ===
On January 3, 1995, during the course of the First Chechen War, Shali was repeatedly bombed with cluster bombs by Russian jet aircraft.

War journalist Anna Politkovskaya said that on January 9 and 10, 2000, Russian forces killed more than 200 civilians by a missile and mortar shelling in Shali.

== Climate ==
Shali has a humid continental climate (Köppen climate classification: Dfa).

Climate data for Shali
| Month | Jan | Feb | Mar | Apr | May | Jun | Jul | Aug | Sep | Oct | Nov | Dec | Year |
|---|---|---|---|---|---|---|---|---|---|---|---|---|---|
| Mean daily maximum °C (°F) | 1.1 (34.0) | 2.8 (37.0) | 8.2 (46.8) | 17.0 (62.6) | 23.0 (73.4) | 27.3 (81.1) | 30.0 (86.0) | 29.4 (84.9) | 24.1 (75.4) | 16.6 (61.9) | 9.2 (48.6) | 3.5 (38.3) | 16.0 (60.8) |
| Daily mean °C (°F) | −2.3 (27.9) | −1.0 (30.2) | 3.9 (39.0) | 11.2 (52.2) | 17.1 (62.8) | 21.3 (70.3) | 24.2 (75.6) | 23.5 (74.3) | 18.4 (65.1) | 11.7 (53.1) | 5.5 (41.9) | 0.4 (32.7) | 11.2 (52.1) |
| Mean daily minimum °C (°F) | −5.7 (21.7) | −4.8 (23.4) | −0.4 (31.3) | 5.4 (41.7) | 11.2 (52.2) | 15.4 (59.7) | 18.4 (65.1) | 17.6 (63.7) | 12.8 (55.0) | 6.8 (44.2) | 1.8 (35.2) | −2.6 (27.3) | 6.3 (43.4) |
| Average precipitation mm (inches) | 22 (0.9) | 25 (1.0) | 25 (1.0) | 39 (1.5) | 65 (2.6) | 78 (3.1) | 60 (2.4) | 47 (1.9) | 41 (1.6) | 34 (1.3) | 31 (1.2) | 24 (0.9) | 491 (19.4) |

== Administrative and municipal status ==
Within the framework of administrative divisions, Shali serves as the administrative center of Shalinsky District. As an administrative division, it is incorporated within Shalinsky District as Shali Town Administration. As a municipal division, Shali Town Administration is incorporated within Shalinsky Municipal District as Shalinskoye Urban Settlement.
