= Chechen State Pedagogical University =

Formation institute in Chechnya (Russia)

Coordinates: 43°19′39″N 45°42′34″E

Chechen State Pedagogical Institute
- Чеченский государственный педагогический институт
- Established: 1980
- Rector: Hasbulatov Bekhan
- Students: 2,984
- Location: Grozny, Chechnya

The Chechen State Pedagogical Institute (Chechen: Нохчийн пачхьалкхан хьехархойн университет, romanized: Noxçiyn paçẋalqan ẋexarxoyn universitet) is a university in Grozny, Chechnya, Russia.

== Background ==
Today, the Chechen State Pedagogical Institute is the leading school in the sphere of higher vocational training in Chechnya. The campus is located at 33 Kiev Street, Grozny, Chechen Republic. Special attention is given to personnel maintenance of educational process and improvements of the material base. The Chechen State Pedagogical Institute offers two modes of study: on-campus and correspondences. There are currently 2,984 students enrolled on campus and 2,583 of them are trained by correspondence.

On November 28, 1980, the decision of the Ministerial council of Grozny was to open the higher educational institute, which was named the Chechen State Teacher Training College. The candidate of pedagogical sciences, Professor Umarov Muhari Umarovich, became the first rector of state teacher's college. Beginning in 1994, the republic war caused destructive losses to the institute. The Teacher's college revival, whose educational cases have been thoroughly destroyed, has begun in a dilapidated building of the former kindergarten.

In 2006, on the Day of Institute (November, 28th) the central case on avenue Orzhonikidze, 62, on which it began its activity, the youngest high school in the republic has become operational.
