= Parliament of the Chechen Republic =

Regional parliament of Chechnya, Russia

Parliament of the Chechen Republic Парламент Чеченской Республики
- 5th legislature

Type
- Type: Unicameral

Leadership
- Chairman: Shaid Zhamaldayev, UR since 15 May 2024

Structure
- Seats: 41
- Political groups: United Russia (37); SRZP (2); CPRF (2)
- Committees: 10

Elections
- Voting system: Proportional representation (5% electoral threshold)
- Last election: 19 September 2021
- Next election: 2026

Website
- parlamentchr.ru

The Parliament of the Chechen Republic (Russian: Парламент Чеченской Республики, romanized: Parlament Chechenskoy Respubliki; Chechen: Нохчийн Республикан Парламент, romanized: Noxçiyn Respublikan Parlament) is the regional parliament of Chechnya, a federal subject of Russia. A total of 41 deputies are elected for five-year terms.

The modern Chechen parliament was established in 2003 after the Constitution of Chechnya was approved in a referendum.

== History ==
After the 1917 establishment of the USSR, the local parliament, the Supreme Soviet of the Chechen Autonomous Oblast merged with Ingushetia, forming the Supreme Soviet of the Chechen-Ingush Autonomous Soviet Socialist Republic. The parliament met twice a year for short sessions.

In Autumn 1995, the pro-Russian Chechen administration led by Doku Zavgaev convened the body with most of the deputies of the old. In June 1996 they held elections to the bicameral National Assembly, which stopped functioning in August 1996, when the control of the republic was in the hands of the separatists and the majority of the elected deputies left Chechnya.

During January and February 1997, another election was conducted to the parliament of Ichkeria. It consisted of about 50 members and it was headed by Ruslan Alikhadzhiyev. Alikhadjiyev disappeared almost immediately after the start of the Second Chechen War. In the fall of 1999 the old Supreme Council of the Chechen-Ingush ASSR, tried to gather for the third time. The chairmen of two of its chambers gathered at Moscow with the remaining deputies and created the so-called Chechen State Council, headed by businessman Malik Saidullayev. This initiative, however, was not supported by the Russian leadership, which chose to re-create the local administration. It was headed by the former Mufti of Ichkeria, Akhmad Kadyrov.

Following the Constitution that was adopted in 2003, a bicameral parliament amendment was introduced. In December 2007, a constitutional referendum abolished the upper house.

== Elections ==
=== 2008 ===
Party	%	Seats
United Russia	88.40	37
A Just Russia	9.20	4
Registered voters/turnout	95.08	

=== 2013 ===
Party	%	Seats
United Russia	85.94	37
A Just Russia	7.27	3
Patriots of Russia	5.07	1
Registered voters/turnout	92.03	

=== 2016 ===
Party	%	Seats
United Russia	87.66	37
A Just Russia	5.63	2
Communist Party of the Russian Federation	5.31	2
Patriots of Russia	1.34	0
Registered voters/turnout	94.79	

=== 2021 ===
Party	%	Seats
United Russia	89.20	37
A Just Russia — For Truth	5.59	2
Communist Party of the Russian Federation	5.16	2
Registered voters/turnout	94.61	
