= List of rural localities in Chechnya =

Map of Russia with Chechnya highlighted

This is a list of rural localities in Chechnya. Chechnya (/ˈtʃɛtʃniə/; Russian: Чечня́, romanized: Chechnyá, IPA: [tɕɪˈtɕnʲa]; Chechen: Нохчийчоь, Noxçiyçö), officially the Chechen Republic (/ˈtʃɛtʃɪn/; Russian: Чече́нская Респу́блика, romanized: Chechénskaya Respúblika, IPA: [tɕɪˈtɕɛnskəjə rʲɪˈspublʲɪkə]; Chechen: Нохчийн Республика, Noxçiyn Respublika), is a federal subject (a republic) of Russia. It is a Federal Subject of Russia located in the North Caucasus, and within 100 kilometres (62 miles) of the Caspian Sea. The capital of the republic is the city of Grozny.

== Achkhoy-Martanovsky District ==
Rural localities on Achkhoy-Martanovsky District:

- Achkhoy-Martan
- Davydenko
- Katyr-Yurt
- Khambi-Irze
- Novy Sharoy
- Samashki
- Shaami-Yurt
- Stary Achkhoy
- Valerik
- Yandi
- Zakan-Yurt

== Galanchozhsky District ==
Rural localities in Galanchozhsky District:

- Aka-Bass
- Khaybakha
- Yalkhara

== Groznensky District ==
Rural localities in Groznensky District:

- Khankala
- Starye Atagi
- Tolstoy-Yurt

== Gudermessky District ==
Rural localities in Gudermessky District:

- Oyskhara

== Itum-Kalinsky District ==
Rural localities in Itum-Kalinsky District:

- Itum-Kale

== Kurchaloyevsky District ==
Rural localities in Kurchaloyevsky District:

- Achereshki
- Akhkinchu-Borzoy
- Akhmat-Yurt
- Alleroy
- Bachi-Yurt
- Belty
- Dzhaglargi
- Dzhigurty
- Enikali
- Geldagana
- Khidi-Khutor
- Koren-Benoy
- Kurchaloy
- Mayrtup
- Niki-Khita
- Regita
- Tsotsi-Yurt
- Yalkhoy-Mokhk

== Nadterechny District ==
Rural localities in Nadterechny District:

- Goragorsky
- Znamenskoye

== Naursky District ==
Rural localities in Naursky District:

- Chernokozovo
- Naurskaya

== Nozhay-Yurtovsky District ==
Rural localities in Nozhay-Yurtovsky District:

- Benoy
- Meskety
- Nozhay-Yurt

== Sernovodsky District ==
Rural localities in Sernovodsky District:

- Assinovskaya
- Bamut
- Sernovodskoye

== Shalinsky District, Chechen Republic ==
Rural localities in Shalinsky District, Chechen Republic:

- Avtury
- Novye Atagi

== Sharoysky District ==
Rural localities in Sharoysky District:

- Khimoy
- Sharoy

== Shatoysky District ==
Rural localities in Shatoysky District:

- Borzoy
- Shatoy

== Shelkovskoy District ==
Rural localities in Shelkovskoy District:

- Shelkovskaya

== Urus-Martanovsky District ==
Rural localities in Urus-Martanovsky District:

- Roshni-Chu

== Vedensky District ==
Rural localities in Vedensky District:

- Agishbatoy
- Belgatoy
- Benoy
- Dargo
- Dutsin-Khutor
- Dyshne-Vedeno
- Elistanzhi
- Ersenoy
- Eshilkhatoy
- Gezinchu
- Guni
- Kharachoy
- Khattuni
- Khazhi-Yurt
- Makhkety
- Marzoy-Mokhk
- Mekhkadettan-Irze
- Mesedoy
- Nizhny Kurchali
- Selmentauzen
- Shirdi-Mokhk
- Sredny Kurchali
- Tazen-Kala
- Tevzana
- Tsa-Vedeno
- Vedeno
- Verkhatoy
- Verkhny Kurchali
- Verkhny Tsa-Vedeno
- Zelamkhin-Kotar

== See also ==
- Lists of rural localities in Russia
