= Khazhi-Yurt =

Village in Vedensky District, Russia

Coordinates: 43°02′28″N 46°04′32″E

Khazhi-Yurt (Chechen: Хьажи-Йурт, Ẋaƶi-Yurt; Russian: Первомайское), also known by its Russian name, Pervomayskoye, is a rural locality (a selo) in Vedensky District, Chechnya.

== Administrative and municipal status ==
Municipally, Khazhi-Yurt is incorporated into Guninsky rural settlement. It is one of the four settlements included in it.

== Geography ==
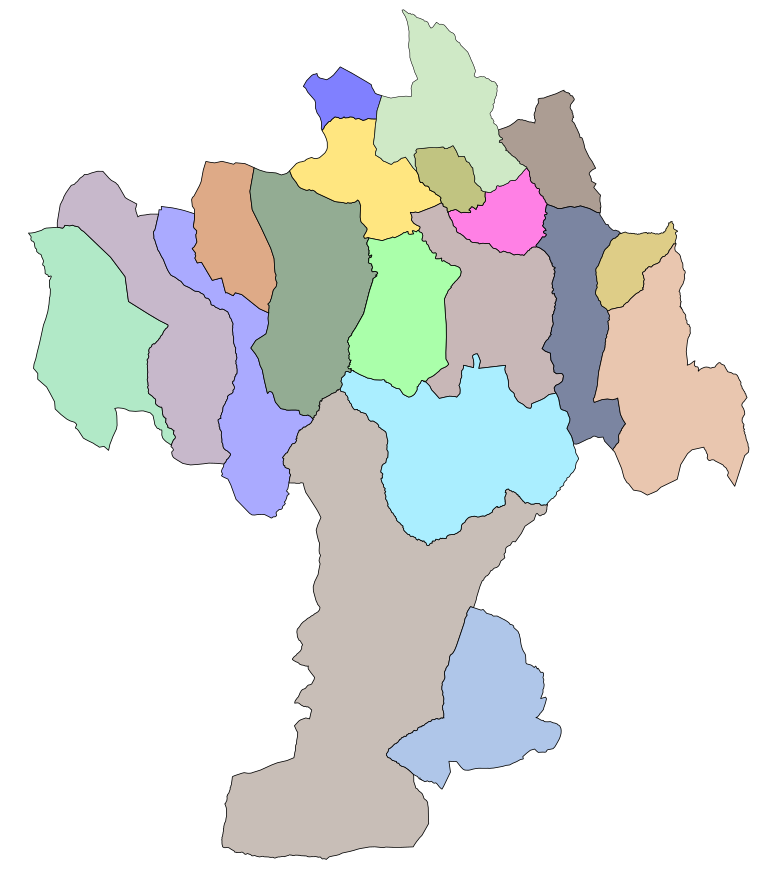
Map of Vedensky District. Khazhi-Yurt is in the Guni rural settlement

Khazhi-Yurt is located in the mountainous forest zone of Vedensky District. It is located on the right bank of the Khulkhulau River, 15 kilometres (9.3 mi) north-east of the village of Vedeno.

The nearest settlements to Khazhi-Yurt are Guni and Marzoy-Mokhk in the north-east, Agishbatoy and Mesedoy in the south-east, Zelamkhin-Kotar in the south, Tsa-Vedeno in the west and Benoy in the north-west.

== History ==
The village has a number of holy places associated with the life of Kunta-haji.

In 1944, after the genocide and deportation of the Chechen and Ingush people the Chechen-Ingush ASSR was abolished, the village of Khazhi-Yurt (then Khazhi-Aul) was renamed to Pervomayskoye, and settled by people from the neighboring republic of Dagestan. From 1944 to 1957, it was a part of the Vedensky District of the Dagestan ASSR.

After the Vaynakh people returned and the Chechen-Ingush ASSR was restored, the village did not regain its former name, and kept the name Pervomaiskoye.

In 2009, the Chechen parliament renamed the village to Khazhi-Yurt, as part of the program "Culture of the Chechen Republic, 2008-2011". The Russian government did not recognize the name change, but the village is known by many today as Khazhi-Yurt.

== Population ==
- 1990 Census: 587
- 2002 Census: 479
- 2010 Census: 734
- 2019 estimate: ?

According to the results of the 2010 Census, the majority of residents of Khazhi-Yurt were ethnic Chechens.
