= Verkhny Tsa-Vedeno =

Village in Vedensky District, Russia

Verkhny Tsa-Vedeno (Russian: Верхнее Ца-Ведено, Chechen: Лаккха ЦӀена-Ведана, Lakqa Ċena-Vedana) is a rural locality (a selo) in Vedensky District, Chechnya.

== Administrative and municipal status ==
Municipally, Verkhny Tsa-Vedeno is incorporated into Tsa-Vedenskoye rural settlement. It is one of three settlements included in it.

== Geography ==
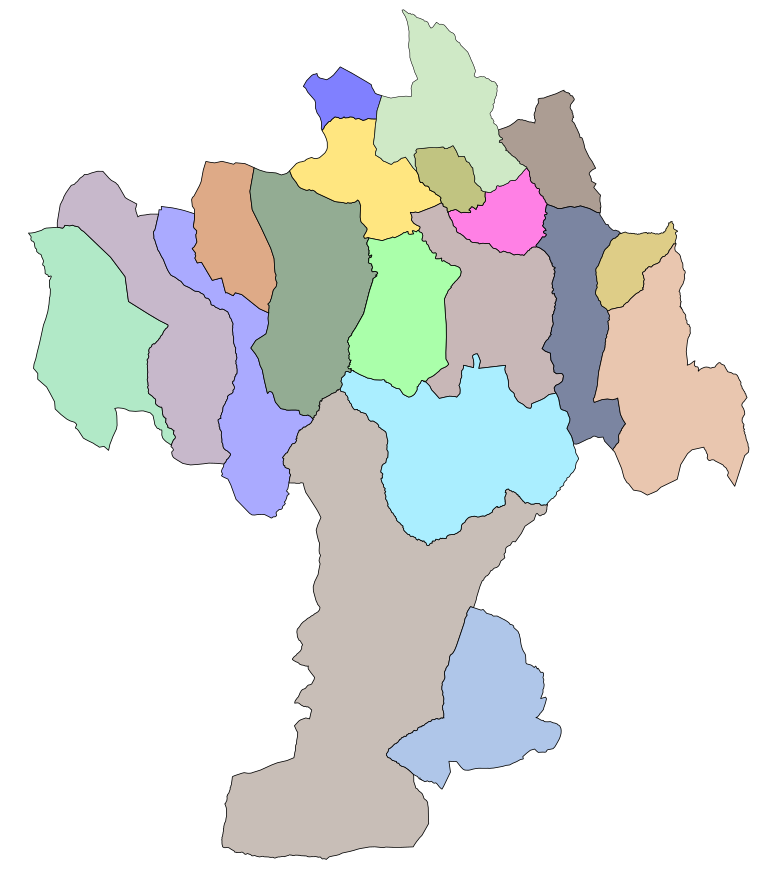
Map of Vedensky District. Verkhny Tsa-Vedeno is in the Tsa-Vedeno rural settlement

Verkhny Tsa-Vedeno is located on the left bank of the Khulkhulau River. It is 5 kilometres (3.1 mi) north-west of the village of Vedeno.

The nearest settlements to Verkhny Tsa-Vedeno are Tsa-Vedeno in the north, Verkhatoy in the north-west, Eshilkhatoy in the south, Elistanzhi in the south-west, Ersenoy in the south-east, and Agishbatoy in the east.

== History ==
In 1944, after the genocide and deportation of the Chechen and Ingush people and the Chechen-Ingush ASSR was abolished, the village of Verkhny Tsa-Vedeno was renamed, and settled by people from the neighboring republic of Dagestan. From 1944 to 1958, it was a part of the Vedensky District of the Dagestan ASSR.

In 1958, after the Vaynakh people returned and the Chechen-Ingush ASSR was restored, the village regained its old Chechen name, Verkhny Tsa-Vedeno.

== Population ==
- 2002 Census: 0
- 2010 Census: 556
- 2019 estimate: ?

According to the 2010 Census, the majority of residents of Verkhny Tsa-Vedeno were ethnic Chechens.
