= Verkhatoy =

Village in Vedensky District, Russia

Coordinates: 43°02′N 46°02′E

Verkhatoy (Russian: Верхатой, Chechen: ВорхатIа, Vorxatha) is a rural locality (a selo) in Vedensky District, Chechnya.

== Administrative and municipal status ==
Municipally, Verkhatoy is incorporated into Tsa-Vedenskoye rural settlement. It is one of three settlements included in it.

== Geography ==
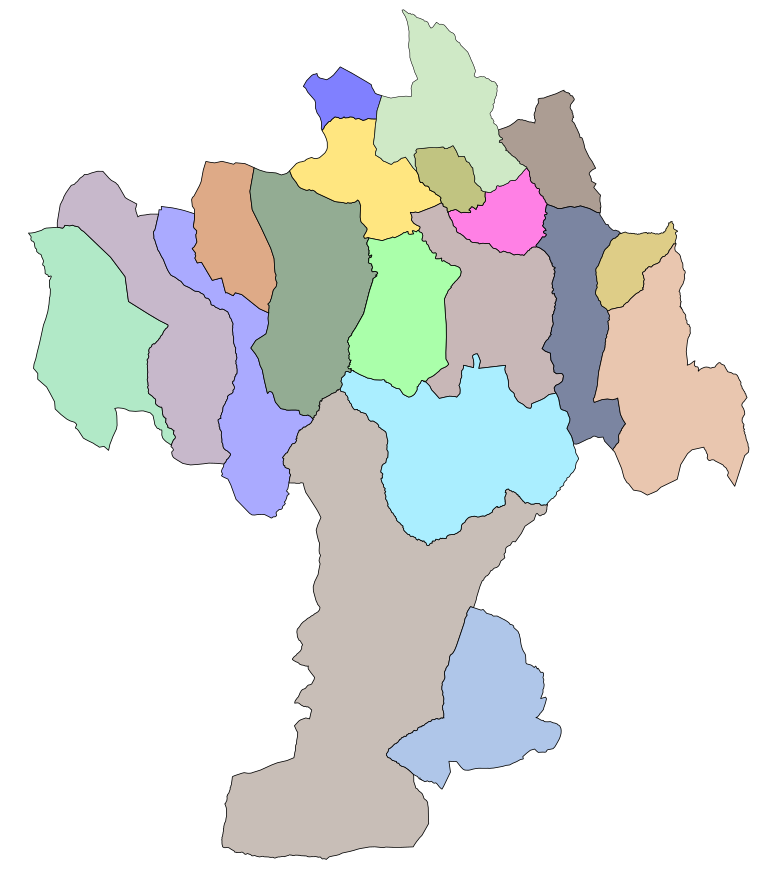
Map of Vedensky District. Verkhatoy is in the Tsa-Vedeno rural settlement, in the north

Verkhatoy is located between the Elistanzhi and Khulkhulau rivers. It is 10 kilometres (6.2 mi) north-east of the village of Vedeno.

The nearest settlements to Verkhatoy are Benoy in the north, Guni and Khadzhi-Yurt in the north-east, Tsa-Vedeno and Verkhny Tsa-Vedeno in the south-east, Eshilkhatoy and Elistanzhi in the south, and Khattuni in the south-west.

== History ==
In 1944, after the genocide and deportation of the Chechen and Ingush people and the Chechen-Ingush ASSR was abolished, the village of Verkhatoy was renamed, and settled by people from the neighboring republic of Dagestan. From 1944 to 1958, it was a part of the Vedensky District of the Dagestan ASSR.

In 1958, after the Vaynakh people returned and the Chechen-Ingush ASSR was restored, the village regained its old Chechen name, Verkhatoy.

== Population ==
- 2002 Census: 465
- 2010 Census: 971
- 2019 estimate: ?

According to the 2010 Census, the majority of residents of Verkhatoy were ethnic Chechens.
