= Tazen-Kala =

Rural locality in Vedensky District, Chechnya, Russia

Coordinates: 42°58′52″N 46°10′59″E

Tazen-Kala (Russian: Тазен-Кала, Chechen: Тезa-Кхаьлла, Teza-Qälla) is a rural locality (a selo) in Vedensky District, Chechnya.

== Administrative and municipal status ==
Municipally, Tazen-Kala is incorporated into Tazen-Kalinsky rural settlement. It is the administrative center of the municipality and one of the six settlements included in it.

== Geography ==
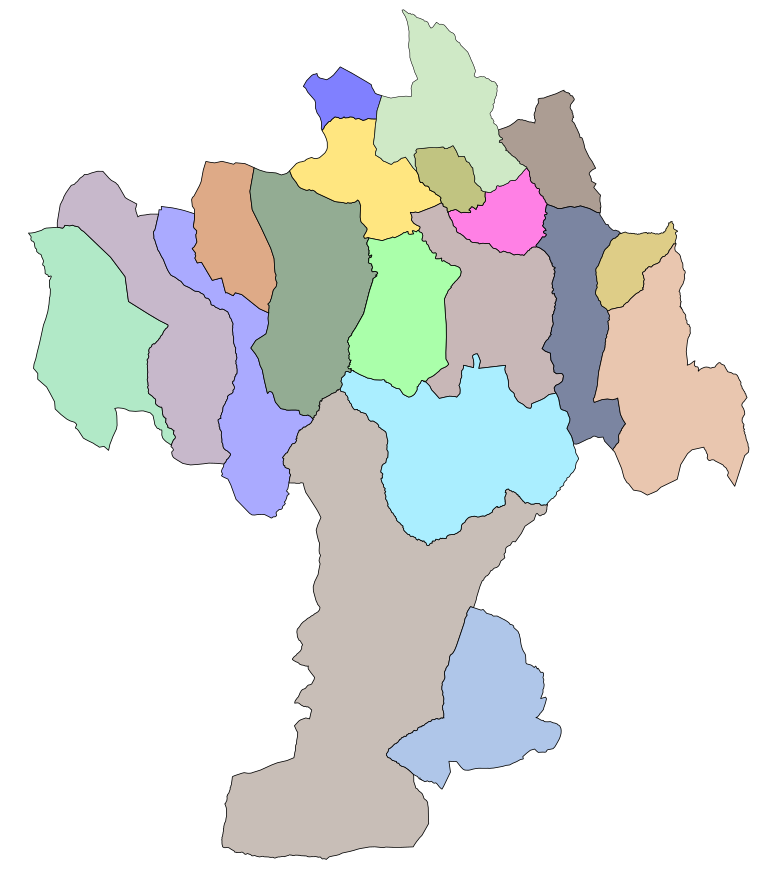
Map of Vedensky District. Tazen-Kala is in the north-east

Tazen-Kala is located on the right bank of the Gums River. It is located 22 kilometres (14 mi) north-east of Vedeno.

The nearest settlements to Tazen-Kala are Verkhny Kurchali in the north, Tsentaroy in the north-east, Belgatoy in the east, Dargo in the south-east, Kharachoy in the south-west, Dyshne-Vedeno in the west, and Ersenoy in the north-west. The republic of Dagestan is to the south of the village.

== History ==
In 1944, after the genocide and deportation of the Chechen and Ingush people and the Chechen-Ingush ASSR was abolished, the village of Tazen-Kala was renamed to Mokok, and settled by people from the neighboring republic of Dagestan. From 1944 to 1957, it was a part of the Vedensky District of the Dagestan ASSR.

In 1958, after the Vaynakh people returned and the Chechen-Ingush ASSR was restored, the village regained its old Chechen name, Teza-Kala.

== Population ==
- 2002 Census: 821
- 2010 Census: 685
- 2019 estimate: ?

According to the results of the 2010 Census, the majority of residents of Tazen-Kala were ethnic Chechens. The majority of the village's population are from the Akka and Chebarloy tukkhums.
