= Belgatoy, Vedensky District =

Village in Vedensky District, Russia

Belgatoy (Russian: Белгатой, Chechen: БелгIата, Belġata) is a rural locality (a selo) in Vedensky District, Chechnya.

== Administrative and municipal status ==
Municipally, Belgatoy is incorporated as Belgatoyskoye rural settlement. It is the administrative center of the municipality and the only settlement included in it.

== Geography ==
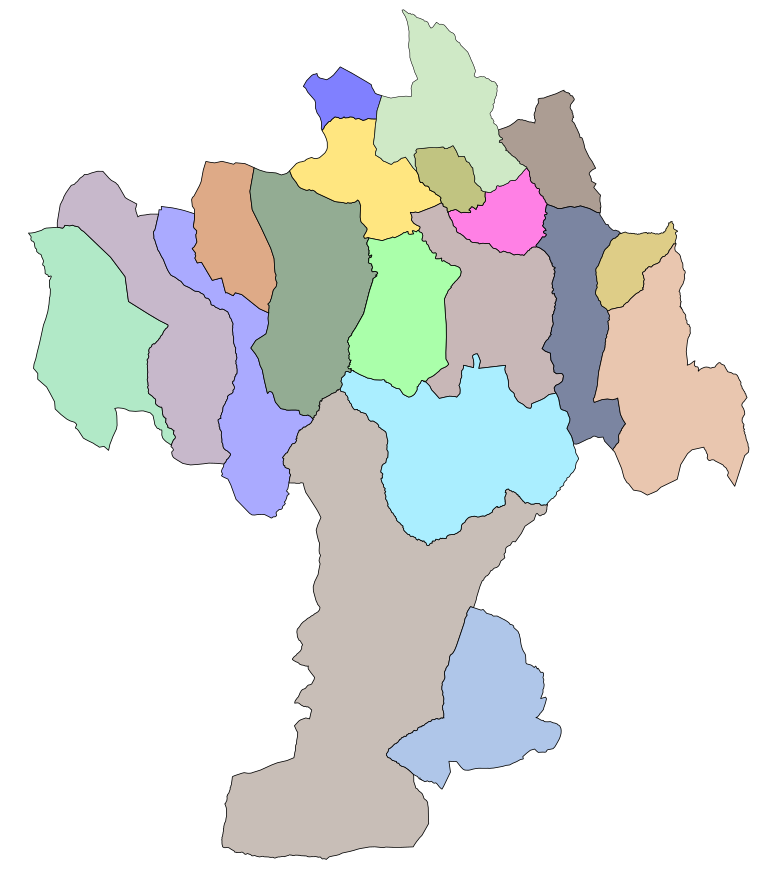
Map of Vedensky District. Belgatoy is in the north-east

Belgatoy is located on the right bank of the Aksay River, opposite to the village of Dargo. It is 28 kilometres (17 mi) north-east of the village of Vedeno and 94 kilometres (58 mi) south-east of the city of Grozny.

The nearest settlements to Belgatoy are Nizhny Kurchali in the north-east, Dargo in the east, Tazen-Kala in the south-east, Vedeno in the south-west, Agishbatoy in the west, and Guni in the north-west.

== History ==
According to legend, the village of Belgatoy was founded by a certain Ela Khasi-Khovr, who owned land between the Khulkhulau and Argun rivers. Khasi-Khovr's father lived in the mountains and owned land there, including a gorge in the upper Khulkhulau River, which was used as a shelter for horses. The gorge still keeps the name, "Ховр боьра", which translates roughly as "Khovr's gorge".

In 1944, after the genocide and deportation of the Chechen and Ingush people and the Chechen-Ingush ASSR was abolished, the village of Belgatoy was renamed to Shaitli, and settled by people from the neighboring republic of Dagestan. From 1944 to 1958, it was a part of the Vedensky District of the Dagestan ASSR.

In 1958, after the Vaynakh people returned and the Chechen-Ingush ASSR was restored, the village regained its old Chechen name, Belgatoy.

== Population ==
- 2002 Census: 231
- 2010 Census: 621
- 2019 estimate: 542

According to the 2010 Census, the majority of residents of Belgatoy were ethnic Chechens.
