= Selmentauzen =

Village in Vedensky District, Russia

Coordinates: 42°56′27″N 45°51′47″E

Selmentauzen (Russian: Сельментаузен, Chechen: Селман-Тевзана, Selman-Tevzana or Дуццахоте, Duccaxote) is a rural locality (a selo) in Vedensky District, Chechnya.

== Administrative and municipal status ==
Municipally, Selmentauzen is incorporated into Selmentauzenskoye rural settlement. It is the administrative center of the municipality and is one of the three settlements included in it.

== Geography ==
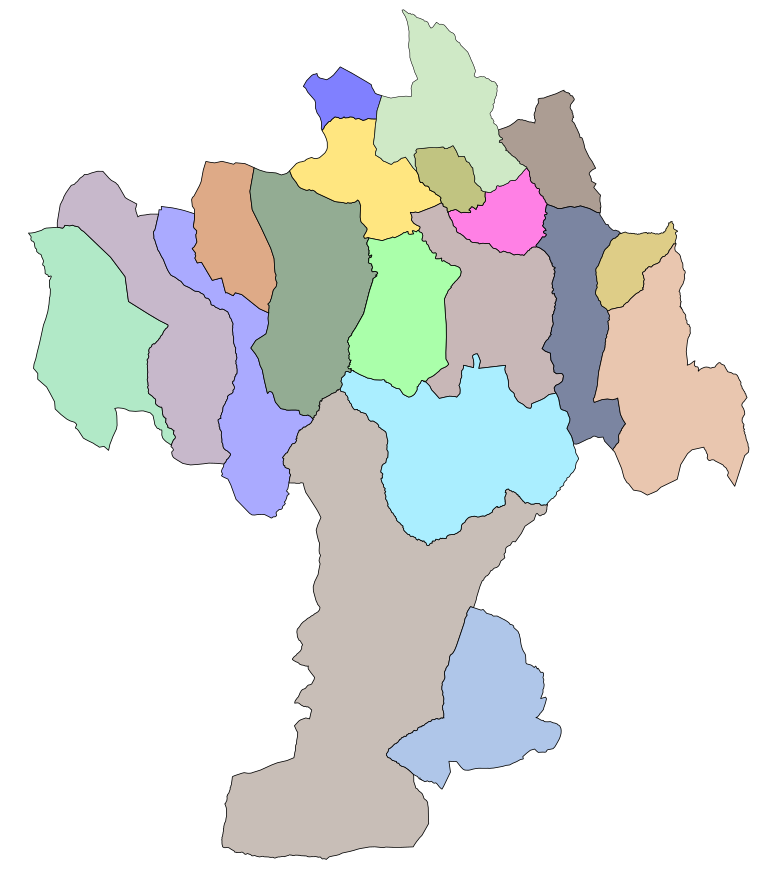
Map of Vedensky District. Selmentauzen is in the west

Selmentauzen is located between the Vashtar and Tenik. It is 36 kilometres (22 mi) west of Vedeno.

The nearest settlements to Selmentauzen are Dutsin-Khutor in the south-west, Zonakh in the west, Ulus-Kert in the north-west, and Makhkety and Tevzana in the north-east.

== History ==
In 1944, after the genocide and deportation of the Chechen and Ingush people and the Chechen-Ingush ASSR was abolished, the village of Selmentauzen was renamed to Khvarshini, and settled by people from the neighboring republic of Dagestan. From 1944 to 1957, it was a part of the Vedensky District of the Dagestan ASSR.

In 1958, after the Vaynakh people returned and the Chechen-Ingush ASSR was restored, the village regained its old name, Selmentauzen.

As of 1 January 1990, the rural settlement included the settlements of Nizhny Selmentauzen (284 people) and Verkhny Selementauzen (309 people).

== Population ==
- 1990 Census: 593
- 2002 Census: 834
- 2010 Census: 909
- 2019 estimate: ?

According to the results of the 2010 Census, the majority of residents of Selmentauzen were ethnic Chechens.
