= Akhmed Tsebiev =

Russian physicist (1935–2000)

Akhmed Magomedovich Tsebiev
- Born: January 1, 1935; Makhkety, Vedensky District, Chechen-Ingush ASSR
- Died: 2000 (aged 65); Grozny, Chechnya
- Occupation: Physicist

Akhmed Magomedovich Tsebiev was a Chechen physicist and inventor from Makhkety, Vedensky District, Chechen-Ingush ASSR. He had a PhD in technical sciences and was the author of 26 inventions in the field of radio electronics and radio communications confirmed by the Soviet State Committee for Inventions and Discoveries. Akhmed was also the author of more than 50 scientific works in open and closed press.

== Biography ==
Akhmed was born into the small village of Makhkety in the Chechen-Ingush ASSR. In 1959, he graduated from Rostov State University. Upon graduation, he moved to the city of Fryazino. In 1974, he defended his thesis for the degree of candidate of technical sciences.

In 1959, a group of employees of NPO Istok in the town of Fryazino, Moscow region, led by Tsebiev, made a discovery of a new phenomenon predicted a year earlier in an article by the American physicist D. Reed:

The previously unknown phenomenon of generation of microwave oscillations by a semiconductor diode with one pn-junction at a negative voltage close to the breakdown voltage, which is observed in the region of the positive slope of the current-voltage characteristic of the diode, has been established. This discovery formula was secret even after 18 years. In the materials presented in 1978 for the Lenin Prize, the formula goes under the code name "Diode".

— A. V. Yakubov, "Akhmed Tsebiev. Olympus and the Scientist's Calvary"

From 1966 to 1973, Akhmed was the scientific supervisor of two research projects and the chief designer of the preliminary project. During this period Tsebiev products that had been created had no analogues in the USSR and abroad. These works were accepted by the State Commissions with a high appraisal and recommended for practical implementation.

Tsebiev's works were included in the book "Discoveries of Soviet Scientists":

Another important property of an avalanche plasma has been discovered: under certain conditions it can emit not coherent, but noise electromagnetic oscillations with a uniform spectrum in a wide frequency band, the intensity of which is determined by the magnitude of the avalanche flow and practically does not depend on temperature and other environmental parameters. This made it possible to create, along with generators of coherent microwave oscillations, miniature sources of stable noise, which turned out to be very convenient for tuning and calibrating highly sensitive radio equipment. On the basis of the discovery, its authors made 15 inventions (a method of generating and amplifying microwave oscillations using semiconductor diodes - (copyright certificate of A. M. Tsebiev et al. No. 185965 dated 06/30/1966), - microwave oscillator - (copyright certificate A. M. Tsebieva and others. No. 250224 dated 06/03/1969)

— Yu. P. Konyusha, Discoveries of Soviet Scientists

== Later life ==
In 1977, a group of employees was nominated for the Lenin Prize. Among the applicants was Tsebiev. All members of this group received the award with the exception of Tsebiev, despite his contribution being the most significant.

In 1983, he returned to Chechen-Ingush ASSR where he worked at the Grozny Oil Institute. In 1983, he started working at NPO Promavtomatika in Grozny. In 1987, the first computer classes were launched in Urus-Martan (school No. 5) and in Grozny (school No. 9). In school No. 9 of Grozny in 1988, Tsebiev combined computers into a wireless local area network.

In 2000, 65-year-old Akhmed was shot and killed by looters from the Russian army only because he refused to hand them his computer.

== Memory ==
His name was given to secondary school No. 9 in Grozny, and the wireless computer network he created 1988 still operates.
