= Dutsin-Khutor =

Village in Vedensky District, Russia

Coordinates: 42°55′41″N 45°51′01″E

Dutsin-Khutor (Russian: Дуц-Хутор or Дуцин-Хутор, Chechen: Дуцин-КӀотор, Ducin-Khotor) is a rural locality (a selo) in Vedensky District, Chechnya.

== Administrative and municipal status ==
Municipally, Dutsin-Khutor is incorporated into Selmentauzenskoye rural settlement. It is one of the three settlements included in it.

== Geography ==
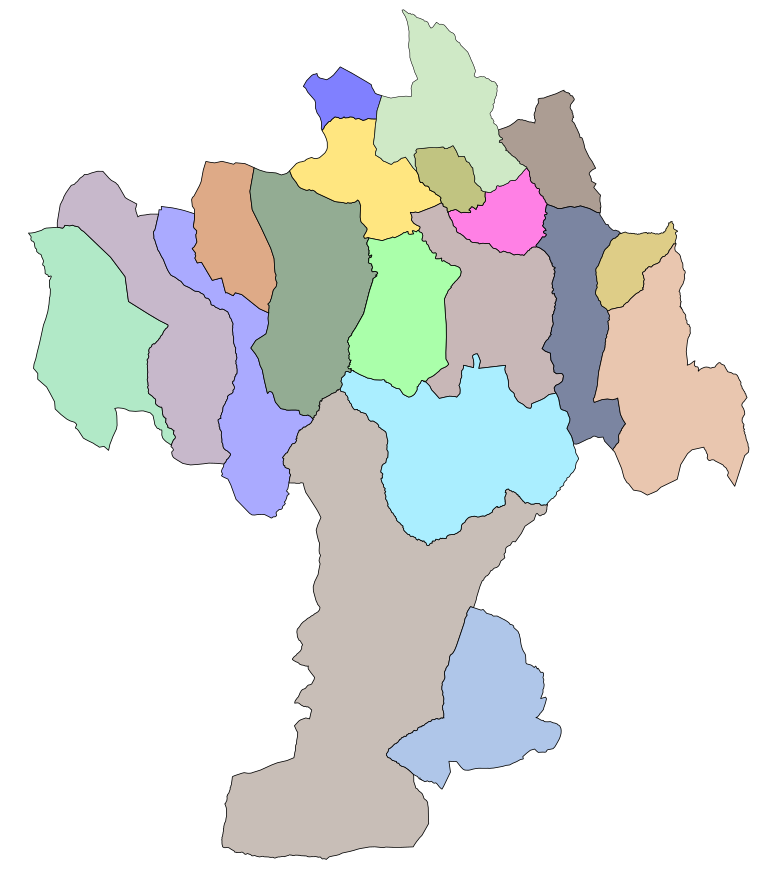
Map of Vedensky District. Dutsin-Khutor is in the Selmentauzen rural settlement

Dutsin-Khutor is located between the Dutsuakhk and Abazulgol rivers. It is 40 kilometres (25 mi) south-west of Vedeno.

The nearest settlements to Dutsin-Khutor are Zony in the west, Ulus-Kert in the north-west, and Makhkety and Selmentauzen in the east.

== History ==
In 1944, after the genocide and deportation of the Chechen and Ingush people and the Chechen-Ingush ASSR was abolished, the village of Dutsin-Khutor was renamed, and settled by people from the neighboring republic of Dagestan. From 1944 to 1958, it was a part of the Vedensky District of the Dagestan ASSR.

In 1958, after the Vaynakh people returned and the Chechen-Ingush ASSR was restored, the village regained its old name, Dutsin-Khutor.

== Population ==
- 1990 Census: 343
- 2002 Census: 0
- 2010 Census: 388
- 2019 estimate: ?

At the 2002 census, Dutsin-Khutor had been abandoned due to the Chechen wars. However, by 2010, the population returned and was higher than the 1990 census.

According to the 2010 census, the majority of residents of Dutsin-Khutor were ethnic Chechens.
