= Benoy, Vedensky District =

Village in Vedensky District, Russia

Benoy (Russian: Беной, Chechen: Бенойн-КӀотар, Benoyn-Khotar) is a rural locality (a selo) in Vedensky District, Chechnya.

== Administrative and municipal status ==
Municipally, Benoy is incorporated as Benoyskoye rural settlement. It is the administrative center of the municipality and the only settlement included in it.

== Geography ==
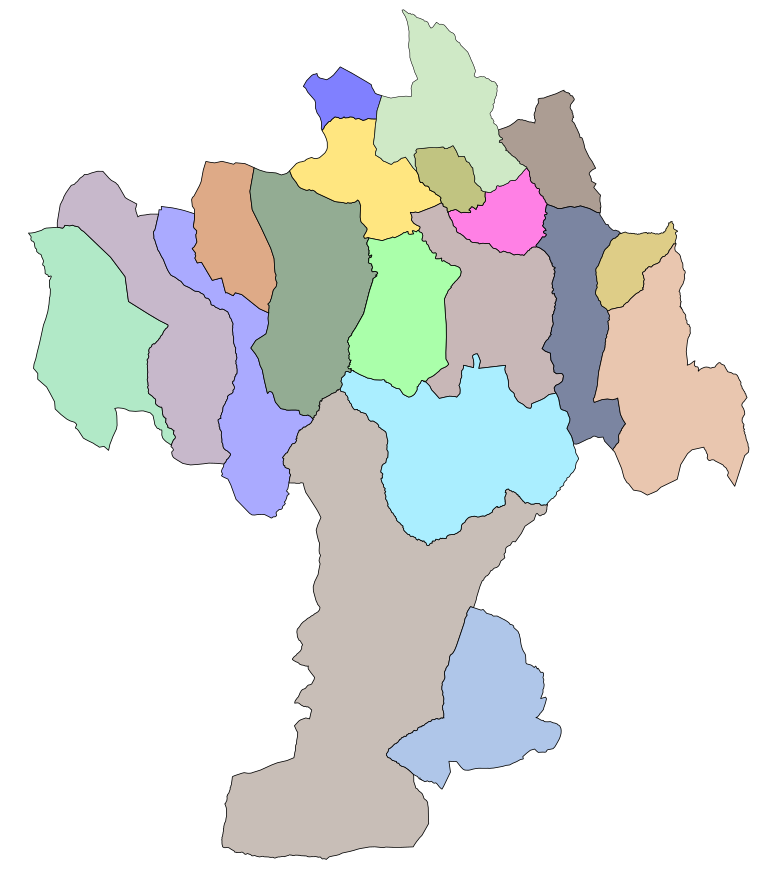
Map of Vedensky District. Benoy is in the north

Benoy is located on the left bank of the Khulkhulau River. It is 15 kilometres (9.3 mi) north-east of the village of Vedeno and around 80 kilometres (50 mi) south-east of the city of Grozny.

The nearest settlements to Benoy are Serzhen-Yurt in the north-west, Marzoy-Mokhk in the north-east, Guni in the east, Khadzhi-Yurt in the south-east, and Tsa-Vedeno in the south.

== History ==
In 1944, after the genocide and deportation of the Chechen and Ingush people and the Chechen-Ingush ASSR was abolished, the village of Benoy was renamed, and settled by people from the neighboring republic of Dagestan. From 1944 to 1958, it was a part of the Vedensky District of the Dagestan ASSR.

In 1958, after the Vaynakh people returned and the Chechen-Ingush ASSR was restored, the village regained its old Chechen name, Benoy.

== Population ==
- 2002 Census: 502
- 2010 Census: 440
- 2019 estimate: 557

According to the 2010 Census, the majority of residents of Benoy were ethnic Chechens. The majority of the village's population are from the Benoy teip.
