= Mekhkadettan-Irze =

Village in Vedensky District, Russia

Coordinates: 42.957°N 46.086°E

Mekhkadettan-Irze (Chechen: Мехкадаьттан-Ирзе, Mexkadättan-Irze; Russian: Нефтянка), also known by Russian name Neftyanka, is a rural locality (a selo) in Vedensky District, Chechnya.

== Administrative and municipal status ==
Municipally, Neftyanka is incorporated into Vedenskoye rural settlement. It is one of the four settlements included in it.

== Geography ==
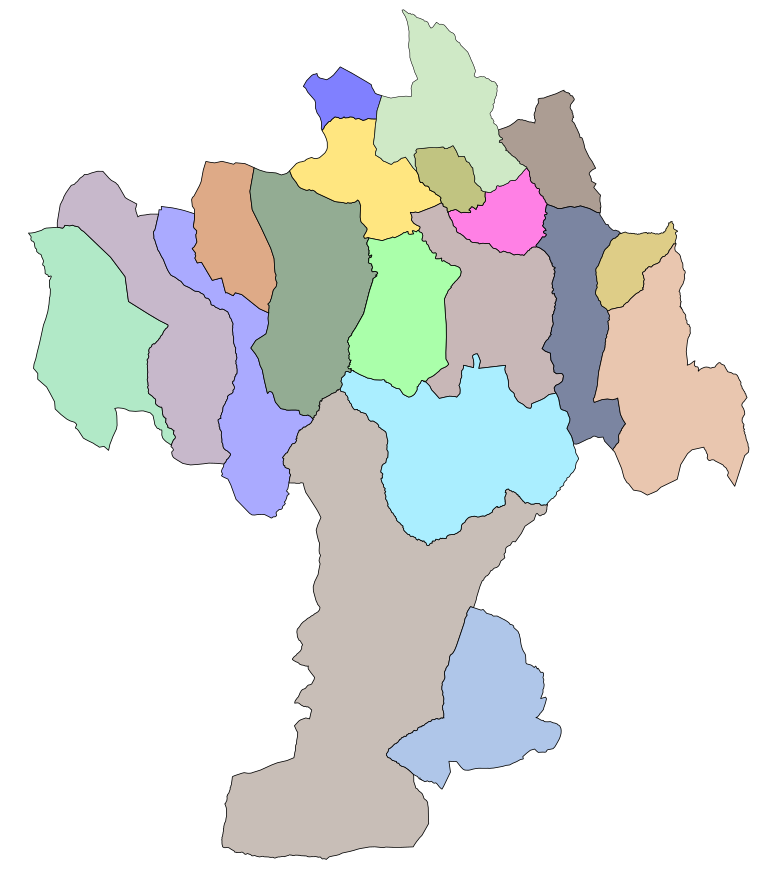
Map of Vedensky District. Neftyanka is in the Vedeno rural settlement

Neftyanka is located on the left bank of the Akhkichu River, opposite from the village of Vedeno.

The nearest settlements to Neftyanka are Eshilkhatoy in the north-west, Zelamkhin-Kotar in the north, Vedeno in the north-east, and Dyshne-Vedeno in the east.

== History ==
In 1944, after the genocide and deportation of the Chechen and Ingush people and the Chechen-Ingush ASSR was abolished, the village of Neftyanka was renamed, and settled by people from the neighboring republic of Dagestan. From 1944 to 1957, it was a part of the Vedensky District of the Dagestan ASSR.

In 1958, after the Vaynakh people returned and the Chechen-Ingush ASSR was restored, the village regained its old Chechen name, Mekhkadettan-Irze.

== Population ==
- 1990 Census: 272
- 2002 Census: 238
- 2010 Census: 300
- 2019 estimate: ?

According to the results of 2010 Census, the majority of residents of Mekhadettan-Irze were ethnic Chechens.
