= Ersenoy =

Village in Vedensky District, Russia

Coordinates: 42°59′51″N 46°08′47″E

Ersenoy (Russian: Эрсеной, Chechen: Эрсана, Ersana) is a rural locality (a selo) in Vedensky District, Chechnya.

== Administrative and municipal status ==
Municipally, Ersenoy is incorporated as Ersenoyskoye rural settlement. It is the administrative center of the municipality and the only settlement included in it.

== Geography ==
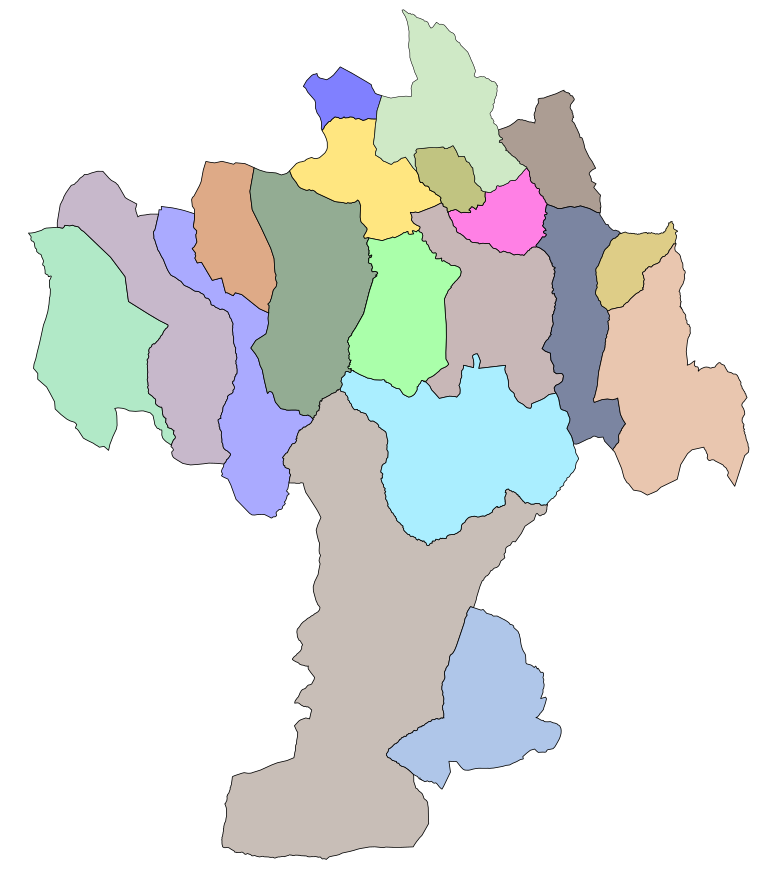
Map of Vedensky District. Ersenoy is in the east

Ersenoy is located on the left bank of the Gums River. It is located 15 kilometres (9.3 mi) north-east of the village Vedeno.

The nearest settlements to Ersenoy are Tazen-Kala in the south-east, Dyshne-Vedeno, Vedeno and Zelamkhin-Kotar in the south-west, Agishbatoy and Mesedoy in the north-west, and Nizhny Kurchali and Sredny Kurchali in the north-east.

== History ==
In 1944, after the genocide and deportation of the Chechen and Ingush people and the Chechen-Ingush ASSR was abolished, the village of Ersenoy was renamed to Kidero, and settled by people from the neighboring republic of Dagestan. From 1944 to 1957, it was a part of the Vedensky District of the Dagestan ASSR.

In 1958, after the Vaynakh people returned and the Chechen-Ingush ASSR was restored, the village regained its old Chechen name, Ersana.

== Population ==
- 2002 Census: 302
- 2010 Census: 420
- 2019 estimate: 460

According to the results of the 2010 Census, the majority of residents of Ersenoy were ethnic Chechens. The majority of the village's population are from the Ersenoy teip.
