= Ibragim-Bek Sarakaev =

Chechen writer

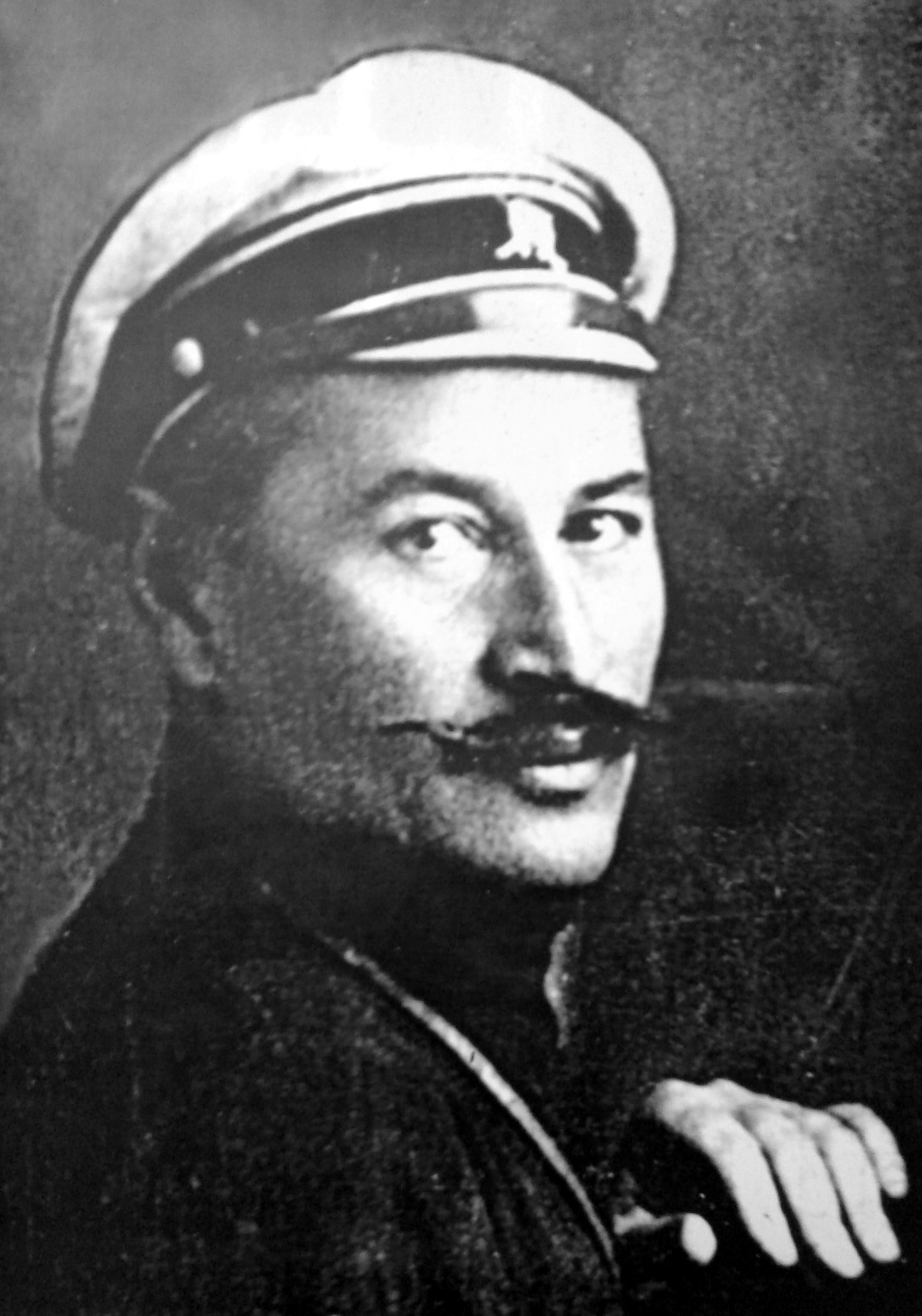
- Born: September 21, 1883 Vedeno, Russian Empire
- Died: 1934 Vedeno, USSR
- Occupation: Publicist, novelist

Ibragim-Bek Sarakaev (21 September 1883 – 1934) was one of the first Chechen writers and publicists, as well as a historian on the traditions and folklore of the Chechen people.

== Biography ==
Sarakaev was born on September 21, 1883, in a fortress of Vedeno. At the beginning of the 20th century, Sarakaev completed his education in the city of Vladikavkaz and left in 1902 to the city of Tiflis. There he began his literary and journalistic career, working in the widely known and popular magazine Caucasus. In 1907, Ibragim-Bek Sarakaev moved to Vladikavkaz and got a job in the newspaper Terek (the then-visible revolutionary Sergey Kirov worked there also). Those years he had written "Nohcho", "Chechen", "Vedanho" and many other stories which were only published in 1911–14.

He also has more than 30 materials on the Chechen Republic that discuss problems of refereeing, culture and formation development, in which it openly criticised lawlessness and an arbitrariness made by representatives of the power. Stories and such large historic-philosophical researches such as Mjuridizm, Court and Execution of Shamil and others were published as well, and under his own surname. In the same years in Vladikavkaz, two large is art-documentary works of Ibragim-Beka Sarakaeva have been printed: in 1913, the book On Slums of the Chechen Republic, and in 1914, The Chechen Republic and Capture of Shamil. They were the first books in the history of the Chechen Republic, truthfully written by the Chechen about the life of the people. In those books, the literary skill of Ibragim-Bek Sarakaeva especially showed.

After the beginning of the First World War, Sarakaev registered in the Savage division. For courage shown in fights on southwest front, Ibragim-Bek was promoted to officer, and then further served as a lieutenant colonel. He was awarded with Sacred George's awards of IV degree and Sacred Anna of II degree with swords.

== In the Soviet Republic ==
In 1914 Ibragim-Bek Sarakaev left for war and wrote and sketched his own stories, but was dissatisfied with their quality and he seldom set them into print. For last 20 years of his life of Ibragim-Bek Sarakaev has been written a little. After the revolution of 1917, he served as the official under special commissions in the Mountain Government. In the days of the civil war, under Kirov's recommendation, Sarakaev served in the well-known XI Red Army as the vice-commander on supply. After a victory of the Soviet power in the Chechen Republic, he became the deputy chief of militia of the Chechen region. The people's Commissariat of Internal Affairs was pursued, but died a natural death in 1934. He is buried in native village Vedeno.
