= Dargo, Vedensky District =

Village in Vedensky District, Russia

Coordinates: 42°57′53″N 46°14′31″E

Dargo (Russian: Дарго, Chechen: ДаьргIа, Därġa, rough translation: "blades") is a rural locality (a selo) in Vedensky District, Chechnya.

== Administrative and municipal status ==
Municipally, Dargo is incorporated into Darginskoye rural settlement. It is the administrative center of the municipality and the only settlement included in it.

== Geography ==
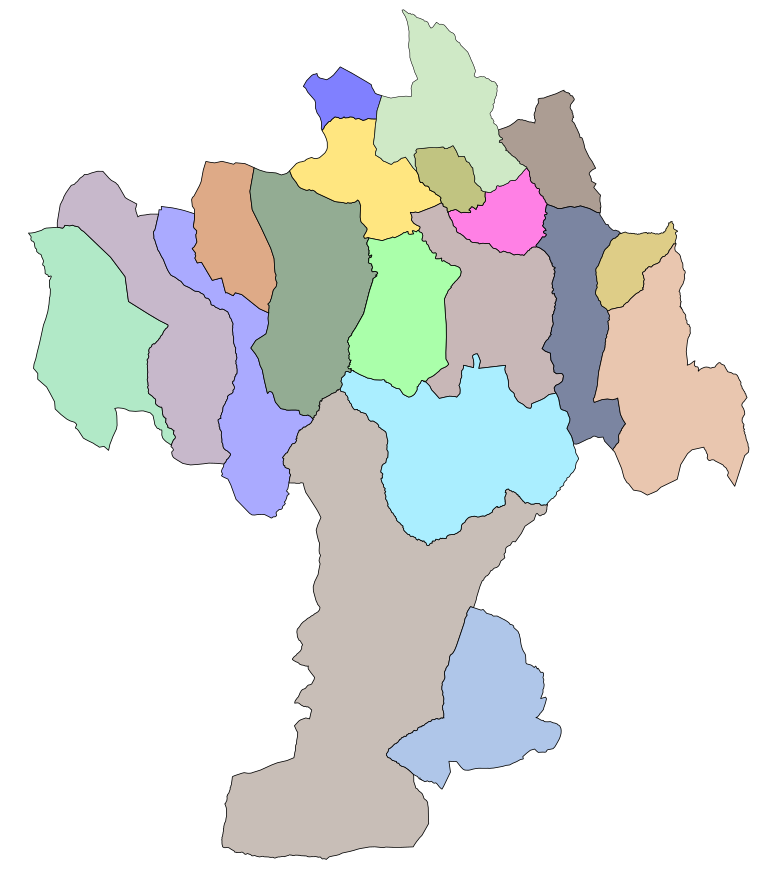
Map of Vedensky District. Dargo is in the east

Dargo is located on the right bank of the Aksay River, opposite from the village of Belgatoy. It is located 20 kilometres (12 mi) east of Vedeno.

The nearest settlements to Dargo are Dzhani-Vedeno in the west, Belgatoy in the north-west, Gurzhi-Mokhk and Koren-Benoy in the north-east, and Benoy-Vedeno in the east.

== History ==
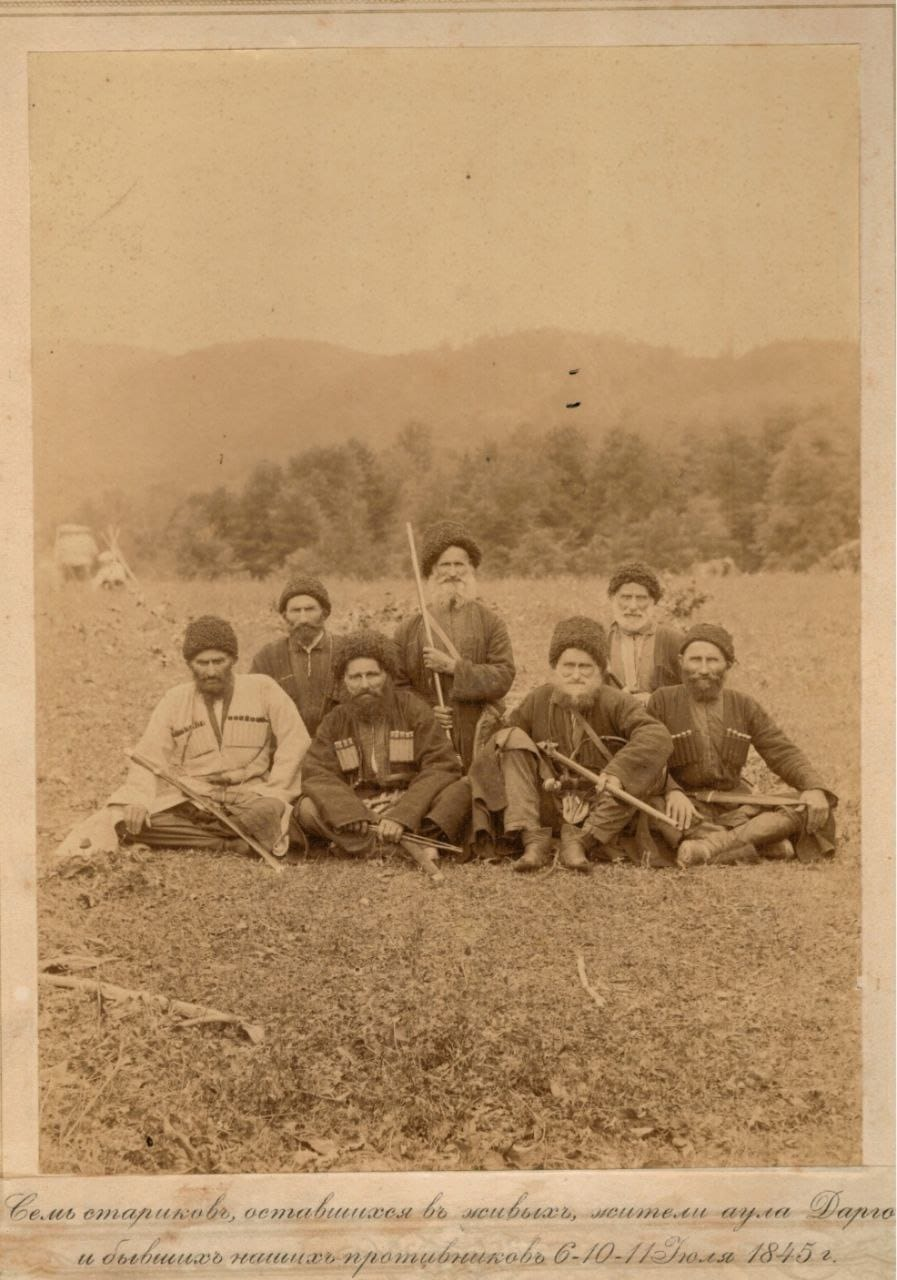
Seven old people who survived are residents of the aul Dargo and our former opponents on July 6-10-11, 1845.

Until 1845, the village was the residence of Imam Shamil, but after desperate resistance, it was taken by the Russian army, under the command of Count Vorontsov. Imam Shamil then fled the village.

In the fall of 1919, the North Caucasian Emirate was created, which existed until March, 1920. During this time, emirate coins were minted in Dargo.

In 1944, after the genocide and deportation of the Chechen and Ingush people and the Chechen-Ingush ASSR was abolished, the village of Dargo was renamed to Tsiyabroso, and settled by Avars from the neighboring republic of Dagestan. From 1944 to 1957, it was a part of the Vedensky District of the Dagestan ASSR.

In 1958, after the Vaynakh people returned and the Chechen-Ingush ASSR was restored, the village regained its old Chechen name, Darga.

== Population ==
- 1990 Census: 2,255
- 2002 Census: 1,190
- 2010 Census: 2,160
- 2019 Census: 2,435

According to the 2010 Census, the majority of residents of Dargo (2,120) were ethnic Chechens, with 40 people coming from other ethnic backgrounds or who did not specify their ethnic background.

== See also ==
Battle of Dargo (1845), the battle in which the village was taken by Russian forces
