= Tevzana =

Tevzana Тевзана
- selo
- Location in Chechnya, Russia Tevzana (Russia)
- Coordinates: 42°58′31″N 45°54′40″E
- Country: Russia
- Federal subject: Chechnya
- District: Vedensky District
- Time zone: UTC+3 (MSK)

Tevzana (Russian: Тевзана, Chechen: Тевзана) is a rural locality (a selo) in Vedensky District, Chechnya.

== Administrative and municipal status ==
Municipally, Tevzana is incorporated as Tevzaninskoye rural settlement. It is the administrative center of the municipality and is the only settlement included in it.

== Geography ==
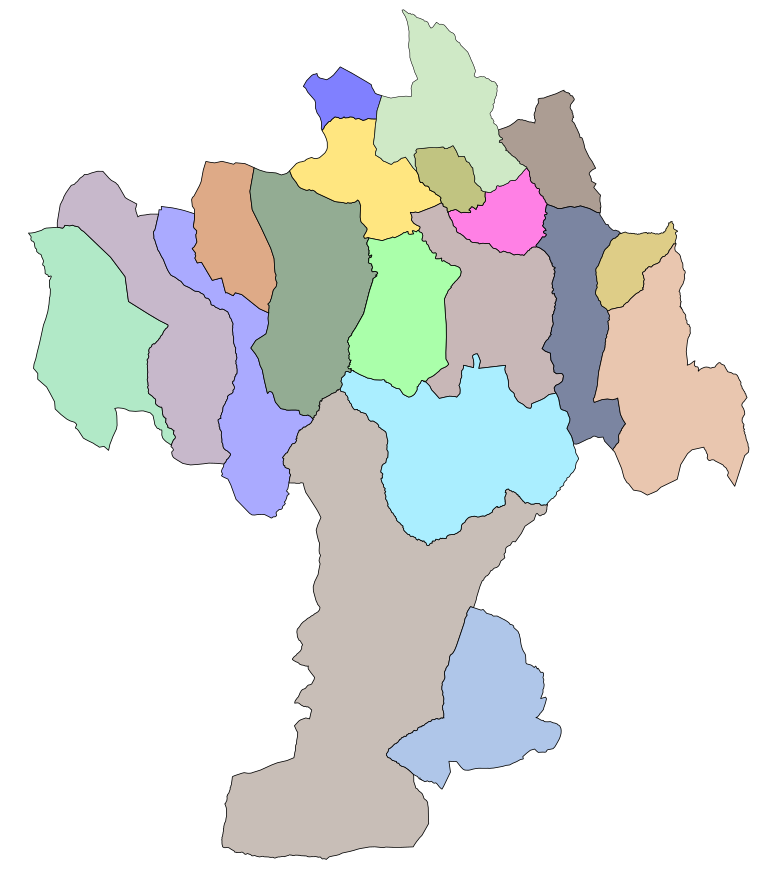
Map of Vedensky District. Tevzana is in the west

Tevzana is located on the left bank of the Dzhalka River, opposite the village of Makhkety. It is located 28 kilometres (17 mi) west of the village of Vedeno.

The nearest settlements to Tevzana are Agishty in the north, Makhkety in the south, and Elistanzhi and Khattuni in the east..

== History ==
In 1944, after the genocide and deportation of the Chechen and Ingush people and the Chechen-Ingush ASSR was abolished, the village of Tevzana was renamed to Kirov-Aul, and settled by people from the neighboring republic of Dagestan. From 1944 to 1957, it was a part of the Vedensky District of the Dagestan ASSR.

In 1958, after the Vaynakh people returned and the Chechen-Ingush ASSR was restored, the village was renamed again to Kirov-Yurt. In the 1990s, the village finally regained its old name, Tevzana.

== Teip composition ==
People of the following teips (clans) live in Tevzana:

- Chebarloy - around 40% of the village's population,
- Elistanzhkhoy - around 35% of the village's population,
- Tsadakhaaroy - around 10% of the village's population,
- Ghezaloy - around 5% of the village's population,
- Chermoy,
- Sharoy,
- Tsamdoy,
- Zumsoy,
- Nashkhoy,
- Akkiy,
- Andiy,
- Tsikaroy.

== Population ==
- 1990 Census: 2,007
- 2002 Census: 1,991
- 2010 Census: 3,378
- 2019 estimate: 3,577

According to the results of the 2010 Census, the majority of residents of Tevzana were ethnic Chechens.
