= Khattuni =

Rural locality in Vedensky, Chechnya, Russia

Coordinates: 42°58′49″N 45°56′15″E

Khattuni (Russian: Хаттуни, Chechen: Хоттане, Xottane) is a rural locality (a selo) in Vedensky District, Chechnya.

== Administrative and municipal status ==
Municipally, Khattuni is incorporated as Khattuninskoye rural settlement. It is the administrative center of the municipality and is the only settlement included in it.

== Geography ==
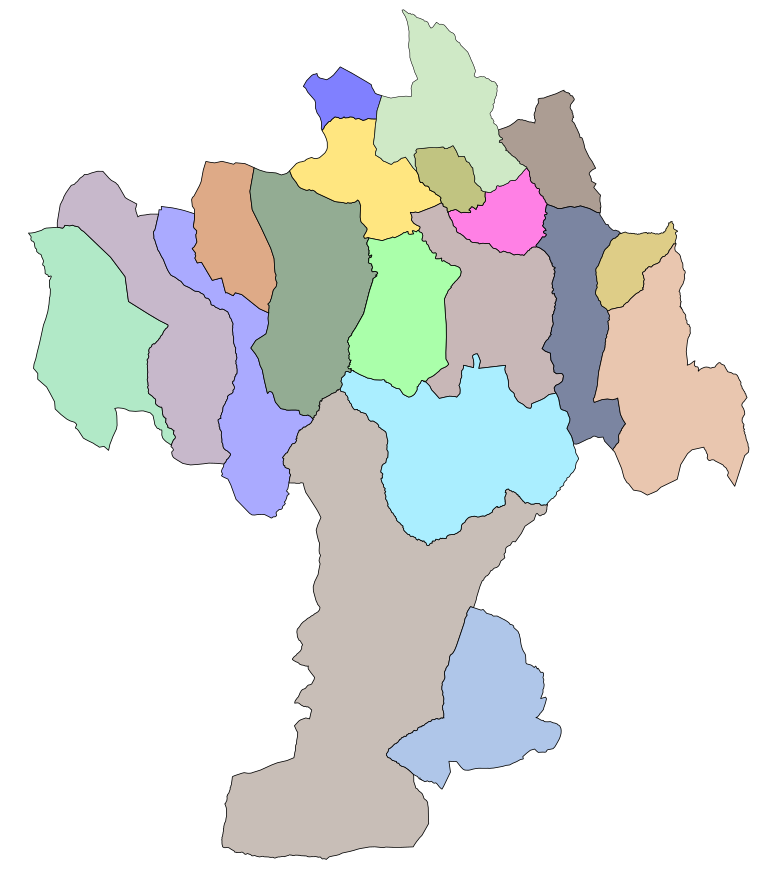
Map of Vedensky District. Khattuni is in the west

Khattuni is located on the left bank of the Khatuni River, a right tributary of the Dzhalka River. It is located 25 kilometres (16 mi) north-west of the village of Vedeno.

The nearest settlements to Khattuni are Elistanzhi in the south-east, Makhkety in the south-west, Tevzana in the west, and Agishty in the north-west.

== Name ==
The name "Khottanye" translates roughly from Chechen as "swampy" or "muddy".

== History ==
In 1944, after the deportation of the Chechen and Ingush people and the Chechen-Ingush ASSR was abolished, the village of Khattuni was renamed to Konkhidatli, and settled by people from the neighboring republic of Dagestan. From 1944 to 1957, it was a part of the Vedensky District of the Dagestan ASSR.

In 1958, after the Vaynakh people returned and the Chechen-Ingush ASSR was restored, the village regained its old Chechen name, Khottanye.

== Population ==
- 2002 Census: 1,572
- 2010 Census: 2,626
- 2019 estimate: 2,828

According to the results of the 2010 Census, the majority of residents of Khattuni were ethnic Chechens.

== Infrastructure ==
Khattuni hosts several important buildings, including a mosque and a high school.
