= Kharachoy =

Village in Vedensky District, Russia

Coordinates: 42°54′15″N 46°08′19″E

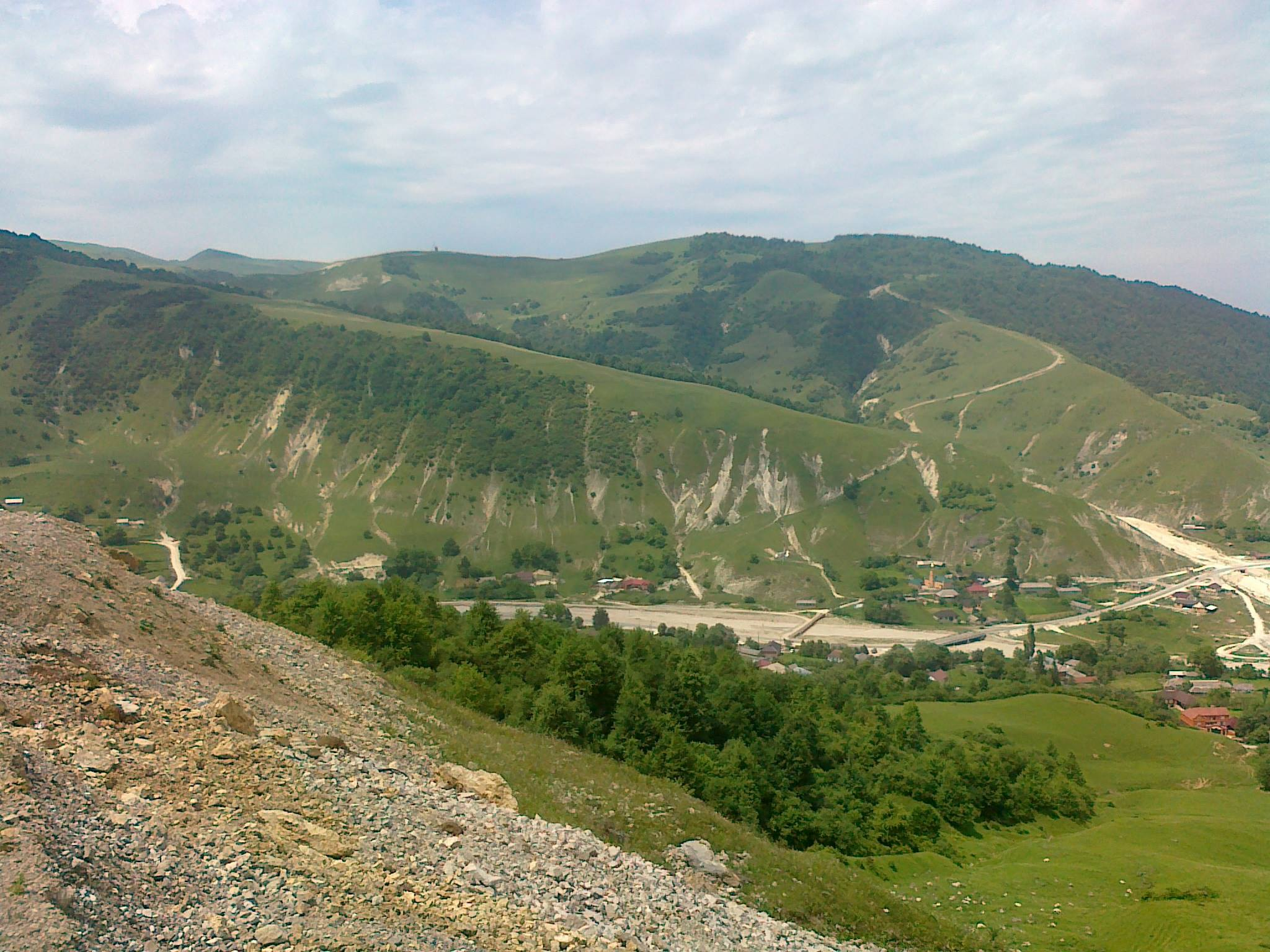
A view of Kharachoy

Kharachoy (Russian: Харачой, Chechen: Хорача, Xoraça) is a rural locality (a selo) in Vedensky District, Chechnya.

== Administrative and municipal status ==
Municipally, Kharachoy is incorporated as Kharachoyskoye rural settlement. It is the administrative center of the municipality and the only settlement included in it.

== Geography ==
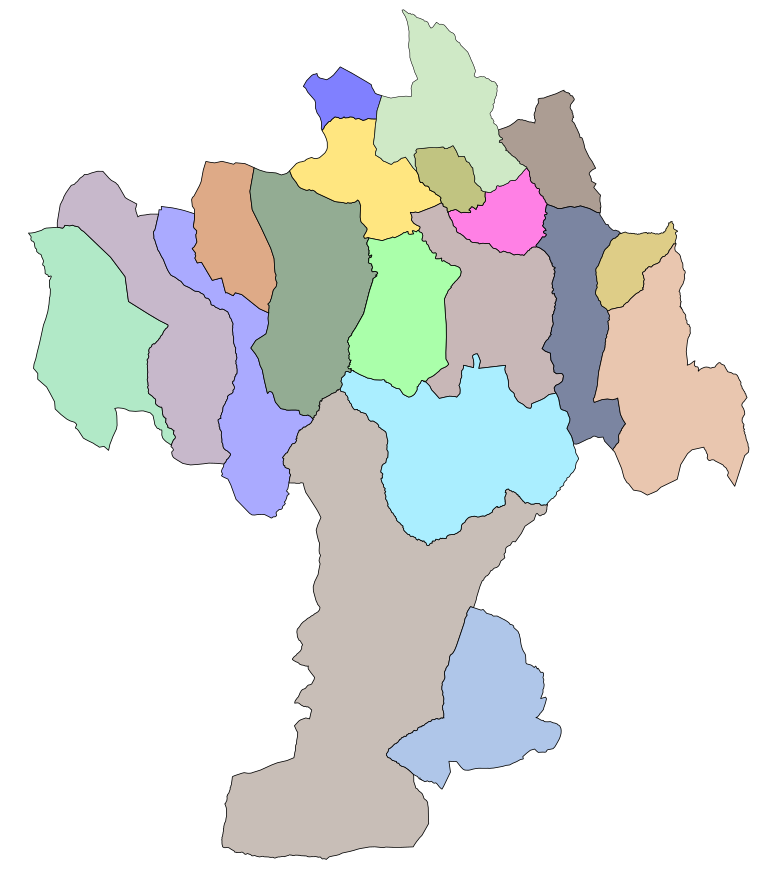
Map of Vedensky District. Kharachoy is in the east

Kharachoy is located in the gorge of the Khulkuhlau River. It is located 7 kilometres (4.3 mi) south of the village of Vedeno.

The nearest settlements to Kharachoy are Mekhkadettan-Irze in the north-west, Dyshne-Vedeno and Vedeno in the north, and Dzhani-Vedeno in the north-east. The republic of Dagestan is to the east and south-east.

== History ==
In Kharachoy and the nearby area, ancient objects and burial grounds can be found.

Kharachoy is the ancestral village of Chechen folk hero Zelimxan.

According to local resident, Taimagaz Sultanova, one of the oldest residents of Chechnya (as of 2014, when she turned 109), on the night of 23 February 1944, all of the men in the village were locked into the local mosque and the other residents of the village were sent to Kazakhstan in exile. Upon the return in 1958, she said that "there was nothing left of our village, just land".

In 1944, after the genocide and deportation of the Chechen and Ingush people and the Chechen-Ingush ASSR was abolished, the village of Kharachoy was renamed to Khvarshi, and settled by people from the neighboring republic of Dagestan. From 1944 to 1957, it was a part of the Vedensky District of the Dagestan ASSR.

In 1958, after the Vaynakh people returned and the Chechen-Ingush ASSR was restored, the village regained its old Chechen name, Kharachoy.

== Kharachoy in the Chechen Wars ==
On 24 October 1995, in a fight with separatists in the area of Kharachoy, Artur Voloshin, a member of the Amur Oblast Internal Affairs, took a wounded group commander out of the danger into a shelter. He then moved other crew members into the sheltered area. Even though he was seriously wounded, he remained and covered other troops with machine-gun fire. He lost his life as a result and after his death he gained the title, Hero of the Russian Federation.

On 17 November 1999, a battle took place near to Kharachoy between some militants and the 31st Ulyanovsk Airborne Brigade. As a result, 12 of the 14 paratroopers were killed, and 2 were seriously injured.

On 30 December 1999, a commander in the Red Banner Northern Fleet, Yuri Kuryagin, together with his platoon, fell into battle with a group of around 15 militants. During the battle, he was injured and shot in the leg, but showed courage and heroism, and refused to move to the back of the group. The next day, on 31 December 1999, the militants attacked the group again, this time with grenades and flamethrowers. There were around 100 militants during this attack. Kuryagin himself was able to kill 4 of the militants before being shot by a sniper. After his death, he gained the title, Hero of the Russian Federation.

== Population ==
- 2002 Census: 618
- 2010 Census: 762
- 2019 estimate: 869

According to the results of the 2010 Census, the majority of residents of Kharachoy were ethnic Chechens.
