= Elistanzhi cluster bomb attack =

1999 Russian massacre in Chechnya

Coordinates: 42.971°N 46.017°E

Elistanzhi bombing
- Location: Elistanzhi, Chechnya
- Date: October 7, 1999
- Target: Demilitarized village
- Attack type: Cluster bombing
- Deaths: At least 34
- Injuries: At least 20
- Perpetrator: Russian Air Force

Elistanzhi cluster bomb attack occurred on October 7, 1999, in Chechnya, when two Russian Sukhoi Su-24 fighter bombers dropped several cluster bombs on the apparently undefended mountain village of Elistanzhi.

The bombing killed at least 34 (48 according to some reports) and injured some 20 to over 100 people in the small village, mostly women and children; at least nine children were reportedly killed when one bomb hit the local school. Witnesses and victims stated that there were no military objectives in the village prior to or at the time of the attack. Representatives of the Russian human rights group Memorial visited Elistanzhi shortly after the bombing and found no evidence of any Chechen separatist military presence in the village.

== See also ==
- 1995 Shali cluster bomb attack
