= Elistanzhi =

Village in Vedensky District, Russia

Coordinates: 42°58′22″N 46°01′02″E

Elistanzhi (Russian: Элистанжи, Chechen: Элистанжа, Elistanƶa) is a rural locality (a selo) in Vedensky District, Chechnya.

== Administrative and municipal status ==
Municipally, Elistanzhi is incorporated as Elistanzhinskoye rural settlement. It is the administrative center of the municipality and the only settlement included in it.

== Geography ==
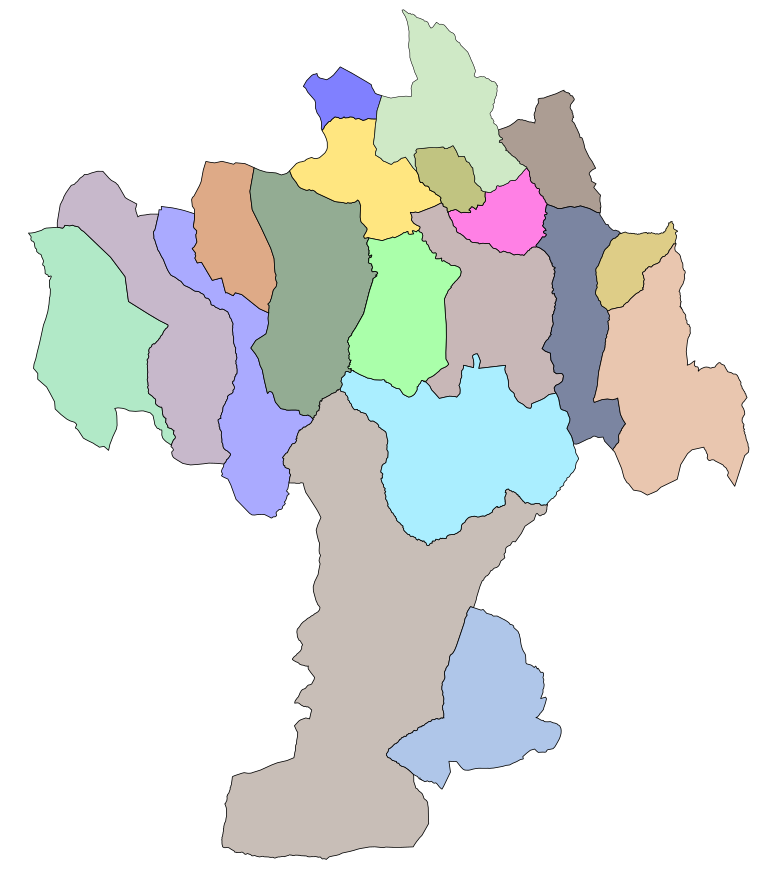
Map of Vedensky District. Elistanzhi is in the west

Elistanzhi is located on the left bank of the Elistanzhi River. It is located 17 kilometres (11 mi) west of the village of Vedeno.

The nearest settlements to Elistanzhi are Tsa-Vedeno and Verkhatoy in the north-east, Vedeno and Zelamkhin-Kotar in the east, Eshilkhatoy in the south-east, and Khattuni and Tevzana in the west.

== History ==
The name of Elistanzhi was originally based on the Chechen clan Elsoy, and the village was called Elsanchu. However, the name was later distorted by Russians, who called the village Elistanzhi.

In 1944, after the genocide and deportation of the Chechen and Ingush people and the Chechen-Ingush ASSR was abolished, the village of Elistanzhi was renamed to Tando, and settled by people from the neighboring republic of Dagestan. From 1944 to 1957, it was a part of the Vedensky District of the Dagestan ASSR.

In 1958, after the Vaynakh people returned and the Chechen-Ingush ASSR was restored, the village regained its old Chechen name, Elistanzha.

== Elistanzhi in the Chechen Wars ==
On 7 October 1999, two Russian Sukhoi Su-24 fighter bombers dropped several cluster bombs onto Elistanzhi. The attack killed at least 34 people, including nine children, who died when a bomb hit the local school. It was later discovered that the village was undefended and no separatist militants has been present in the village at the time of the attack.

== Population ==
- 2002 Census: 1,878
- 2010 Census: 2,570
- 2019 estimate: 2,783

According to the results of the 2010 Census, the majority of residents of Elistanzhi were ethnic Chechens.
