= Tsa-Vedeno =

Village in Vedensky District, Russia

Coordinates: 43°01′23″N 46°03′09″E

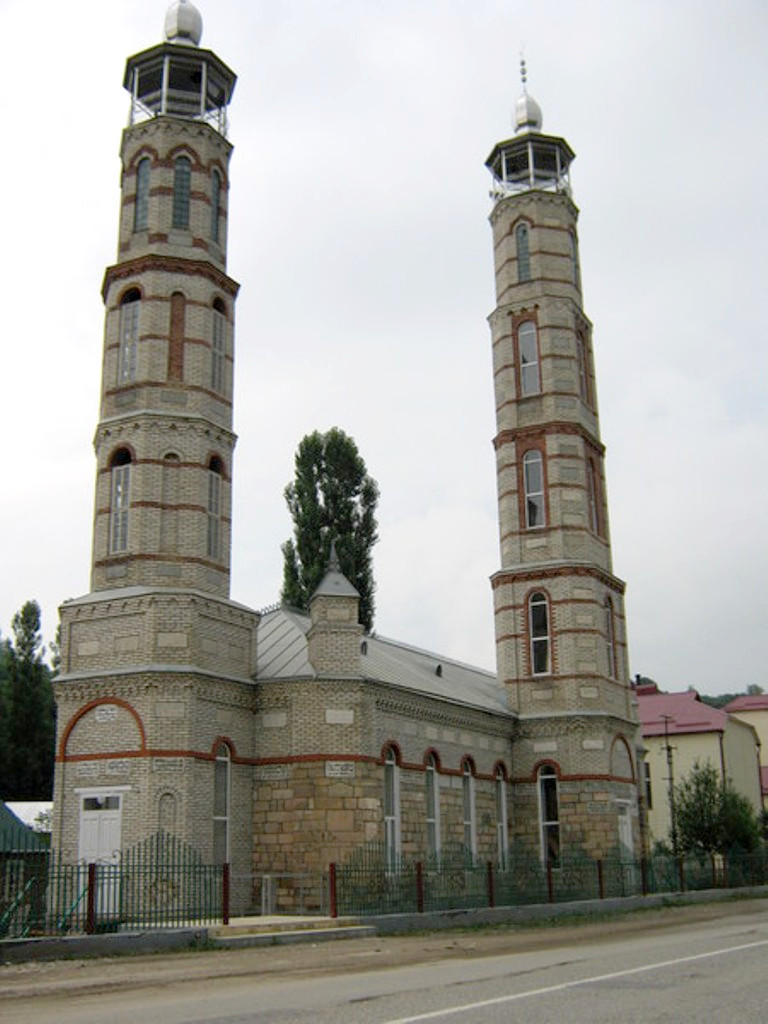
The mosque in the village of Tsa-Vedeno

Tsa-Vedeno (Russian: Ца-Ведено, Chechen: ЦӀен Ведана, Ċen Vedana) is a rural locality (a selo) in Vedensky District, Chechnya.

== Administrative and municipal status ==
Municipally, Tsa-Vedeno is incorporated into Tsa-Vedenskoye rural settlement. It is the administrative center of the municipality and is one of the three settlements included in it.

== Geography ==
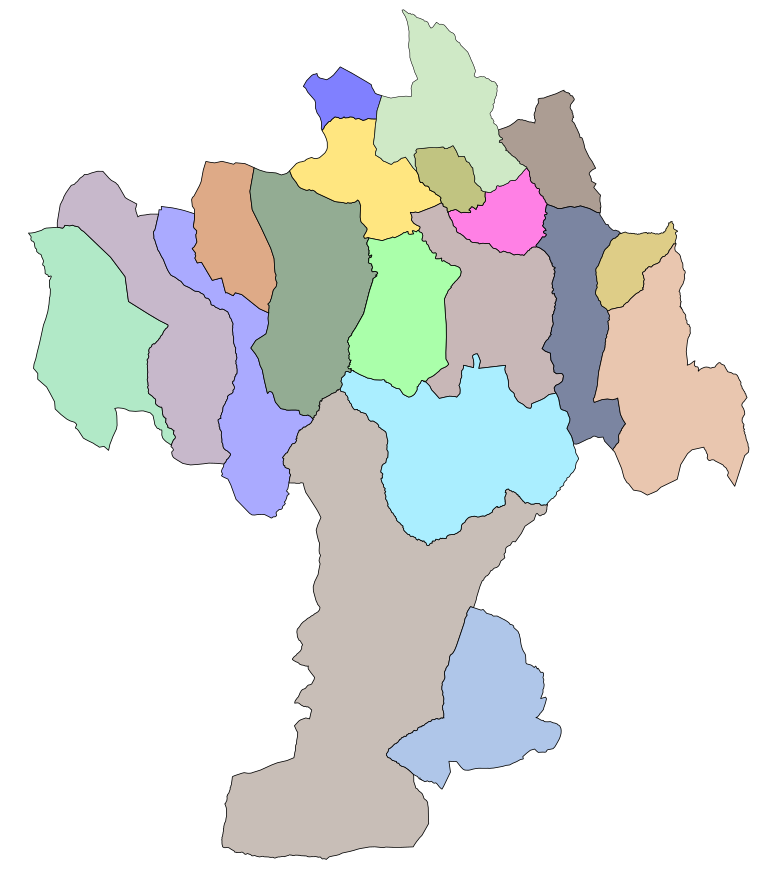
Map of Vedensky District. Tsa-Vedeno is in the north

Tsa-Vedeno is located on the right bank of the Khulkhulau River. It is 7 kilometres (4.3 mi) north-west of the village of Vedeno.

The nearest settlements to Tsa-Vedeno are Khazhi-Yurt in the north-east, Agishbatoy in the south-east, Verkhny Tsa-Vedeno and Zelamkhin-Kotar in the south, Elistanzhi in the south-west, and Verkhatoy in the north-west.

== History ==
In 1944, after the genocide and deportation of the Chechen and Ingush people and the Chechen-Ingush ASSR was abolished, the village of Tsa-Vedeno was renamed to Makhach-Aul, and settled by people from the neighboring republic of Dagestan. From 1944 to 1957, it was a part of the Vedensky District of the Dagestan ASSR.

In 1958, after the Vaynakh people returned and the Chechen-Ingush ASSR was restored, the village regained its old Chechen name, Tsen Vedana.

== Population ==
- 2002 Census: 1,478
- 2010 Census: 1,285
- 2019 estimate: ?

According to the 2010 Census, the majority of residents of Tsa-Vedeno were ethnic Chechens.

== Infrastructure ==
Tsa-Vedeno hosts two secondary schools.
