= Marzoy-Mokhk =

Village in Vedensky District, Russia

Coordinates: 43°05′11″N 46°06′06″E

Marzoy-Mokhk (Russian: Марзой-Мохк, Chechen: Марзойн-Мохк, Marzoyn-Moxk) is a rural locality (a selo) in Vedensky District, Chechnya.

== Administrative and municipal status ==
Municipally, Marzoy-Mokhk is incorporated into Guninskoye rural settlement. It is one of the four settlements included in it.

== Geography ==
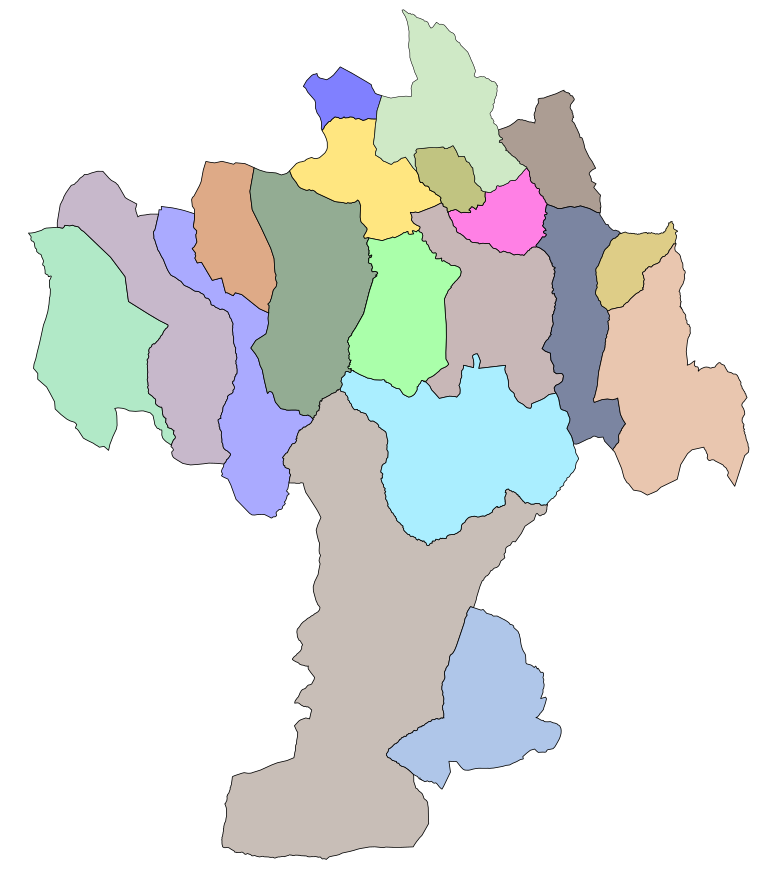
Map of Vedensky District. Marzoy-Mokhk is in the Guni rural settlement

Marzoy-Mokhk is located between the Bulk and Bokh-Dzhaga rivers. It is 22 kilometres (14 mi) north-east of the village of Vedeno.

The nearest settlements to Marzoy-Mokhk are Dzhaglargi in the north, Regita in the north-east, Achereshki in the east, Guni in the south, Benoy and Khadzhi-Yurt in the south-west, Serzhen-Yurt in the west, and Niki-Khita in the north-west.

== History ==
Marzoy-Mokhk is just north of the village of Guni. It was supposedly founded by immigrants from this village, on its pasture lands.

In the 1920s, Marzoy-Mokhk began to grow quickly and became a larger settlement. The village extended along the foothills for 3 to 4 kilometers. Around the same time, two farms, Upper Farm (Chechen: Лакха кӏотар) and Lower Farm (Chechen: Лаха кӏотар) were created. They were mostly settled by immigrants from the villages of Guni, Khazhi-Aul and Cheberloy.

In 1944, after the genocide and deportation of the Chechen and Ingush people and the Chechen-Ingush ASSR was abolished, the village of Marzoy-Mokhk, as well as its two farms, were completely destroyed and abandoned. From 1944 to 1957, it was a part of the Vedensky District of the Dagestan ASSR.

In 1957, after the Vaynakh people returned and the Chechen-Ingush ASSR was restored, the village's former residents were originally not allowed to resettle in the area, but this ban was eventually lifted and the area was resettled in 1958.

In 1958, an elementary school was built in Marzoy-Mokhk. At the same time, a small library also appeared in the village. A high school was later built in the center of the village.

== Population ==
- 1990 Census: 405
- 2002 Census: 337
- 2010 Census: 576
- 2019 estimate: ?

According to the 2010 Census, the majority of residents of Marzoy-Mokhk were ethnic Chechens.

== Infrastructure ==
There is one mosque in Marzoy-Mokhk.
