= Zelamkhin-Kotar =

Village in Vedensky District, Russia

Coordinates: 42°58′49″N 46°04′51″E

Zelamkhin-Kotar (Chechen: Зеламхин-КӀотар, Zelamxin-Khotar; Russian: Октябрьское), also known by Russian name Oktyabrskoye, is a rural locality (a selo) in Vedensky District, Chechnya.

== Administrative and municipal status ==
Municipally, Zelamkhin-Kotar is incorporated into Vedenskoye rural settlement. It is one of the four settlements included in it.

== Geography ==
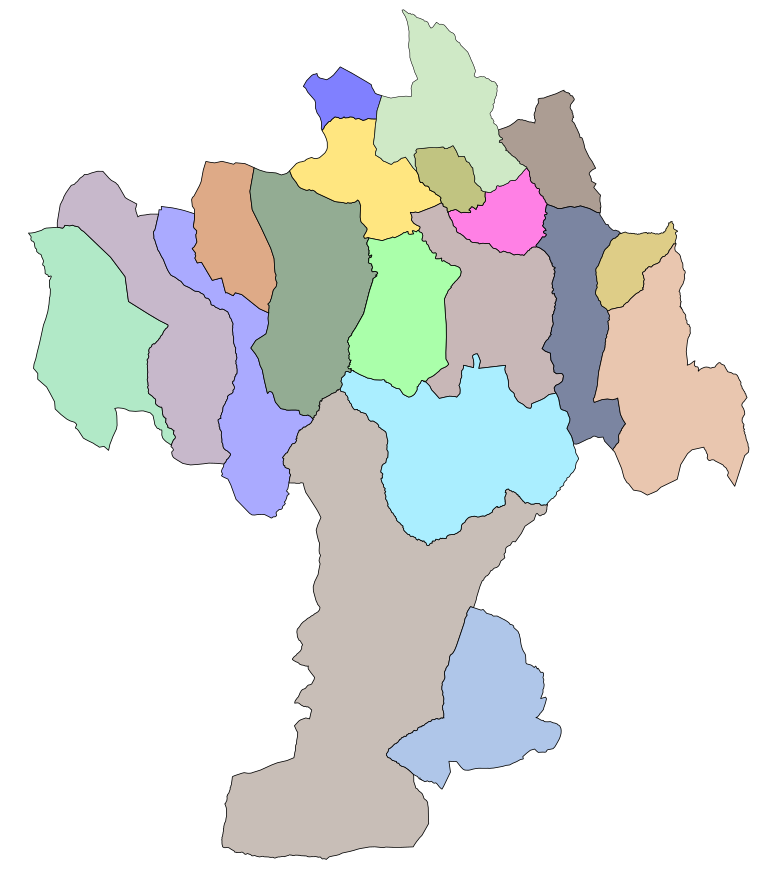
Map of Vedensky District. Zelamkhin-Kotar is in the Vedeno rural settlement

Zelamkhin-Kotar is located between the Khulkhulau and Akhkinchu rivers. It is on the northern outskirts of the village of Vedeno.

The nearest settlements to Zelamkhin-Kotar are Tsa-Vedeno in the north-west, Agishbatoy in the north-east, Vedeno in the south, and Elistanzhi and Eshilkhatoy in the south-west.

== History ==
The village of Zelamkhin-Kotar was originally formed by immigrants from the villages of Eshilkhatoy and Kharachoy. Later, around 10 families moved from Tsa-Vedeno to Zelamkhin-Kotar due to landslides.

== Population ==
- 1990 Census: 780
- 2002 Census: 839
- 2010 Census: 1167
- 2019 estimate: ?

According to the results of the 2010 census, the majority of residents of Zelamkhin-Kotar were ethnic Chechens.
