= Dyshne-Vedeno =

Rural locality in Chechnya

Coordinates: 42°57′19″N 46°07′16″E

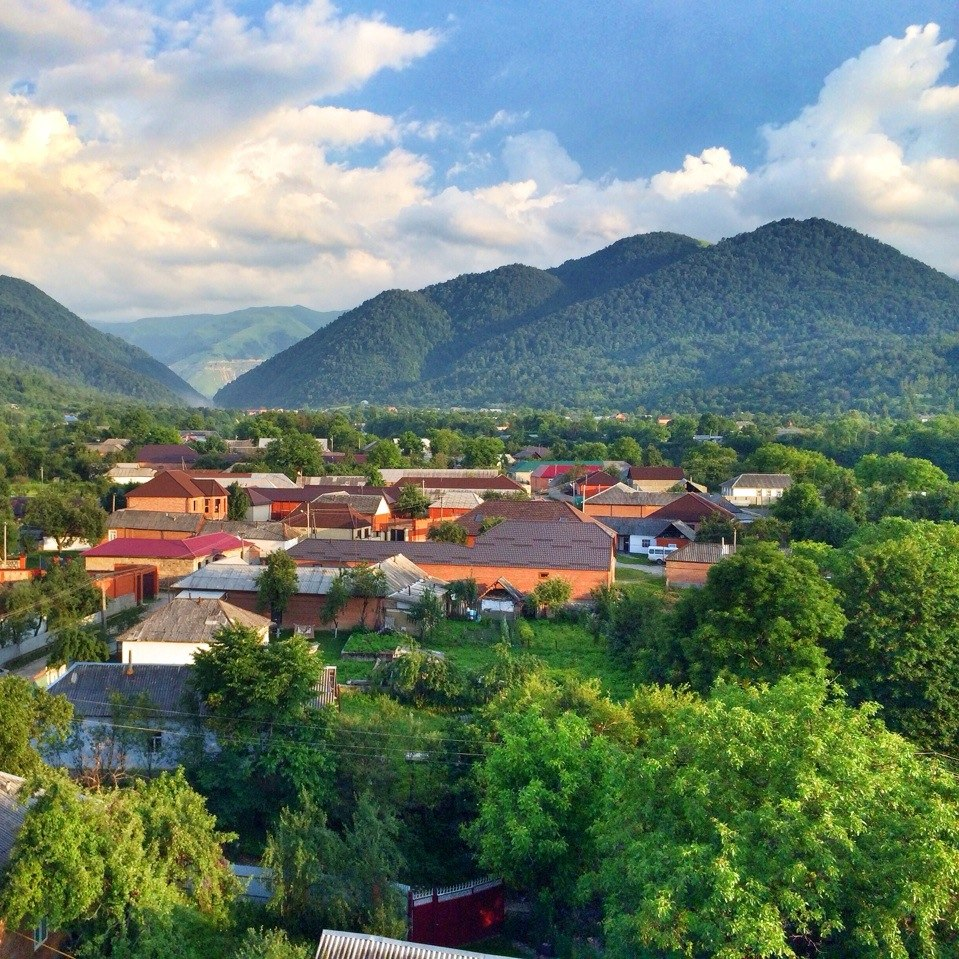
A photo of Dyshne-Vedeno.

Dyshne-Vedeno (Russian: Дышне-Ведено, Chechen: Дишни-Ведана, Dişni-Vedana) is a rural locality (a selo) in Vedensky District, Chechnya.

== Administrative and municipal status ==
Municipally, Dyshne-Vedeno is incorporated as Dyshne-Vedenskoye rural settlement. It is the administrative center of the municipality and the only settlement included in it.

== Geography ==
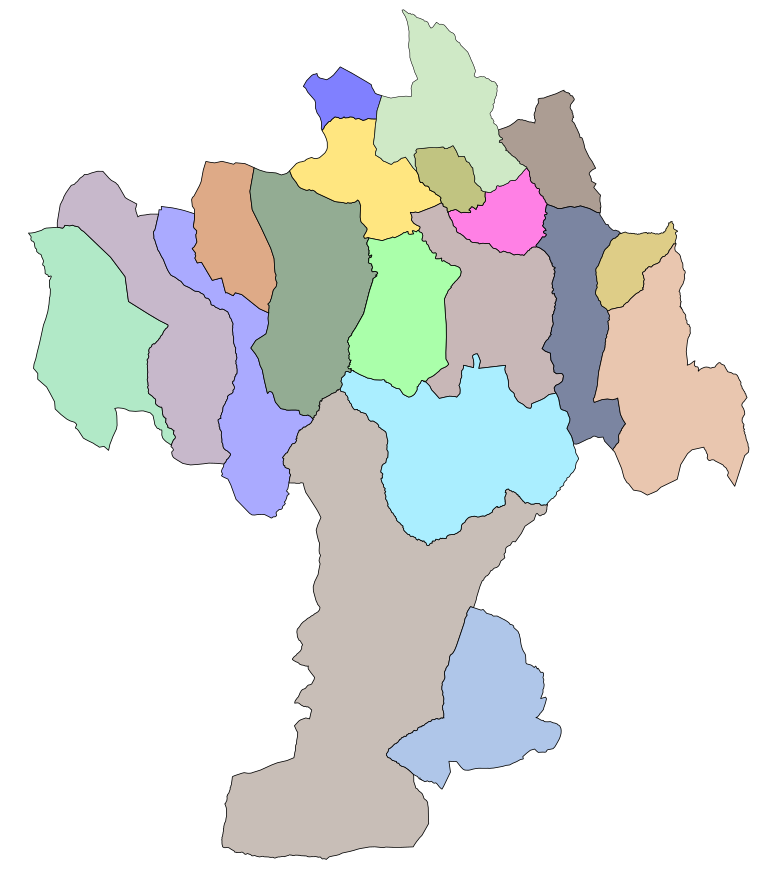
Map of Vedensky District. Dyshne-Vedeno is in the center

Dyshne-Vedeno is located on both banks of the Khulkhulau River. It is on the outskirts of the administrative center of the district, Vedeno.

The nearest settlements to Dyshne-Vedeno are Agishbatoy in the north, Ersenoy and Tazen-Kala in the north-east, Dzhani-Vedeno in the south-east, Kharachoy in the south and Vedeno in the west.

== History ==
In 1944, after the genocide and deportation of the Chechen and Ingush people and the Chechen-Ingush ASSR was abolished, the village of Dyshne-Vedeno was renamed to Aknada, and settled by people from the neighboring republic of Dagestan. From 1944 to 1957, it was a part of the Vedensky District of the Dagestan ASSR.

In 1958, after the Vaynakh people returned and the Chechen-Ingush ASSR was restored, the village regained its old name, Dyshne-Vedeno.

== Population ==
- 1990 Census: 5,210
- 2002 Census: 3,323
- 2010 Census: 4,834
- 2019 estimate: 5,674

According to the 2010 census, the majority of residents of Dyshne-Vedeno were ethnic Chechens.

== Notable people ==
- Shamil Basayev, a native of Dyshne-Vedeno, born here on 14 January 1965.
- Dzhabrail Yamadayev, a Chechen field commander, assassinated in Dyshne-Vedeno on 5 March 2003.
