= Makhkety =

Village in Vedensky District, Russia

Coordinates: 42°57′49″N 45°54′23″E

Makhkety (Russian: Махкеты, Chechen: МахкатӀе, Maxkathe) is a rural locality (a selo) in Vedensky District, Chechnya.

== Administrative and municipal status ==
Municipally, Makhkety is incorporated into Makhketinskoye rural settlement. It is the administrative center of the municipality and is the only settlement included in it.

== Geography ==
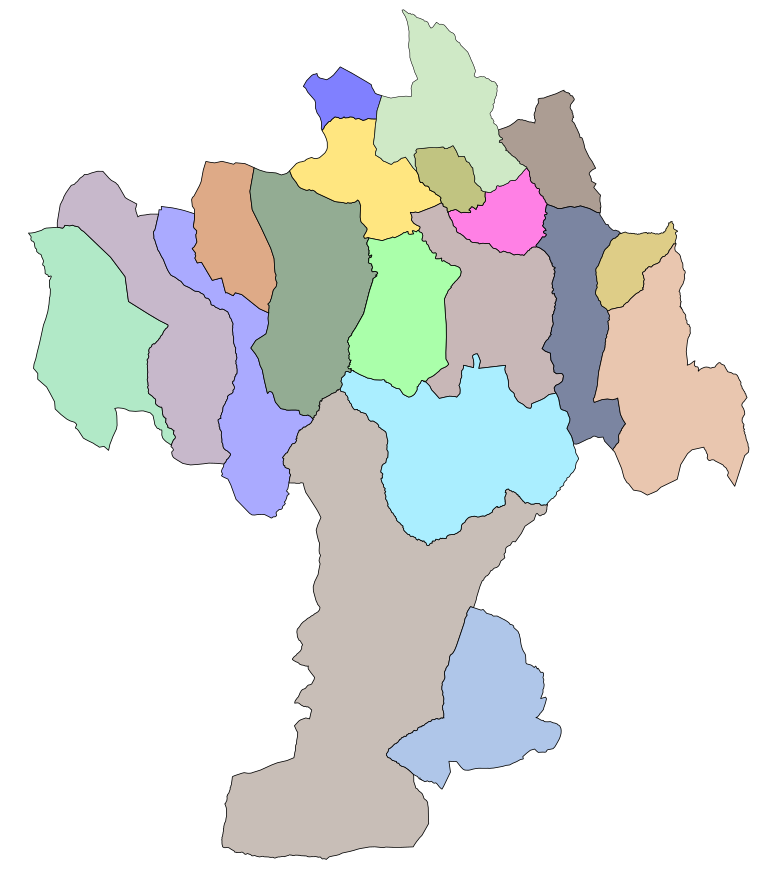
Map of Vedensky District. Makhkety is in the west

Makhkety is located between the Dzhalka and Tenek rivers. It is 30 kilometres (19 mi) west of the village of Vedeno.

The nearest settlements to Makhkety are Agishty in the north, Khattuni and Tevzana in the north-east, and Selmentauzen in the south-west.

Not far from the village, just across the border with Cheberloyevsky District is Barziarlam mountain.

== Name ==
The name "Makhkety" (Chechen: МахкатӀе) comes from the Chechen "мохк" meaning "land" or "homeland", and the ending "-тӀе", meaning "in" or "on". Therefore, the name of the village roughly translates as "settlement in the homeland".

== History ==
In 1944, after the genocide and deportation of the Chechen and Ingush people and the Chechen-Ingush ASSR was abolished, the village of Makhkety was renamed to Alak, and settled by people from the neighboring republic of Dagestan. From 1944 to 1957, it was a part of Grozny Oblast of the Russian SFSR.

In 1958, after the Vaynakh people returned and the Chechen-Ingush ASSR was restored, the village regained its old Chechen name, Makhkatye.

== Population ==
- 1990 Census: 3,870
- 2002 Census: 2,447
- 2010 Census: 5,028
- 2019 estimate: 5,400

According to the 2010 Census, the majority of residents of Makhkety were ethnic Chechens.

== Infrastructure ==
Makhkety has several important buildings. These include a rural mosque, a secondary school, and a museum on local lore.
