= Eshilkhatoy =

Village in Vedensky District, Russia

Coordinates: 42°57′49″N 46°03′14″E

Eshilkhatoy (Russian: Эшилхатой, Chechen: Эшилхата, Eşilxata) is a rural locality (a selo) in Vedensky District, Chechnya.

== Administrative and municipal status ==
Municipally, Eshilkhatoy is incorporated into Vedenskoye rural settlement. It is one of the four settlements included in it.

== Geography ==
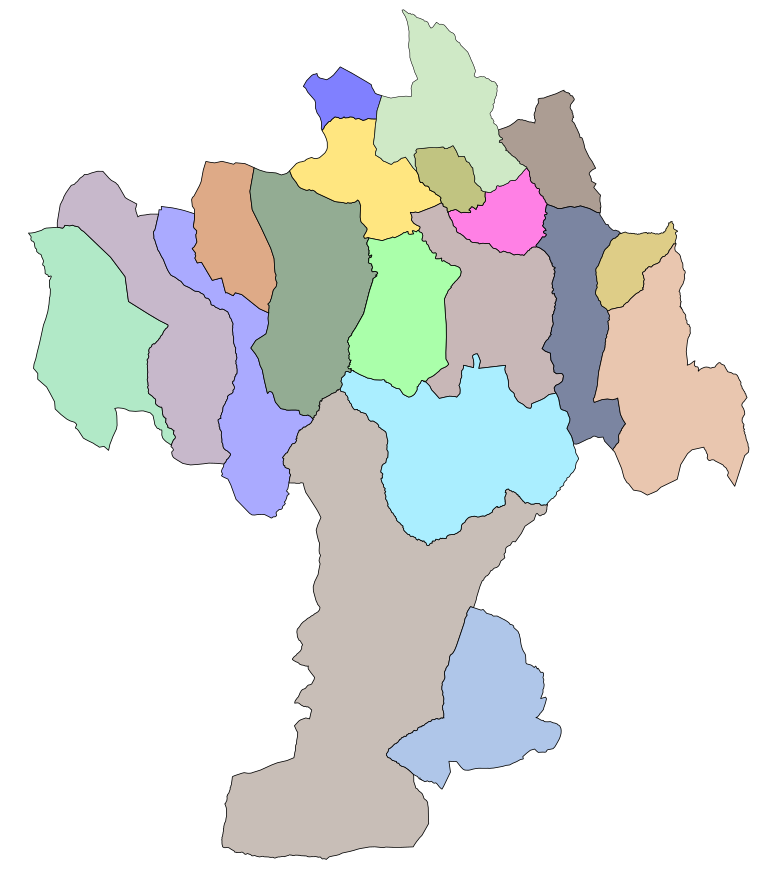
Map of Vedensky District. Eshilkhatoy is in the Vedeno rural settlement

Eshilkhatoy is located on the right bank of the Elistanhzi River. It is located 5 kilometres (3.1 mi) west of the village of Vedeno.

The nearest settlements to Eshilkhatoy are Zelamkhin-Kotar in the north-east, Vedeno in the east, Mekhkadettan-Irze in the south-east, and Elistanzhi in the west.

== History ==
In 1944, after the genocide and deportation of the Chechen and Ingush people and the Chechen-Ingush ASSR was abolished, the village of Eshilkhatoy was renamed to Zebirkolo, and settled by people from the neighboring republic of Dagestan. From 1944 to 1957, it was a part of the Vedensky District of the Dagestan ASSR.

In 1958, after the Vaynakh people returned and the Chechen-Ingush ASSR was restored, the village regained its old Chechen name, Eshilkhata.

== Population ==
- 1990 Census: 320
- 2002 Census: 247
- 2010 Census: 406
- 2019 estimate: ?

According to the results of the 2010 Census, the majority of residents of Eshilkhatoy were ethnic Chechens.
