= Agishbatoy =

Village in Vedensky District, Russia

Coordinates: 43°00′44″N 46°06′29″E

Agishbatoy (Russian: Агишбатой, Chechen: ЭгIашбета, Eġaşbeta) is a rural locality (a selo) in Vedensky District, Chechnya.

== Administrative and municipal status ==
Municipally, Agishbatoy is incorporated as Agishbatoyskoye rural settlement. It is the administrative center of the municipality and the only settlement included in it.

== Geography ==
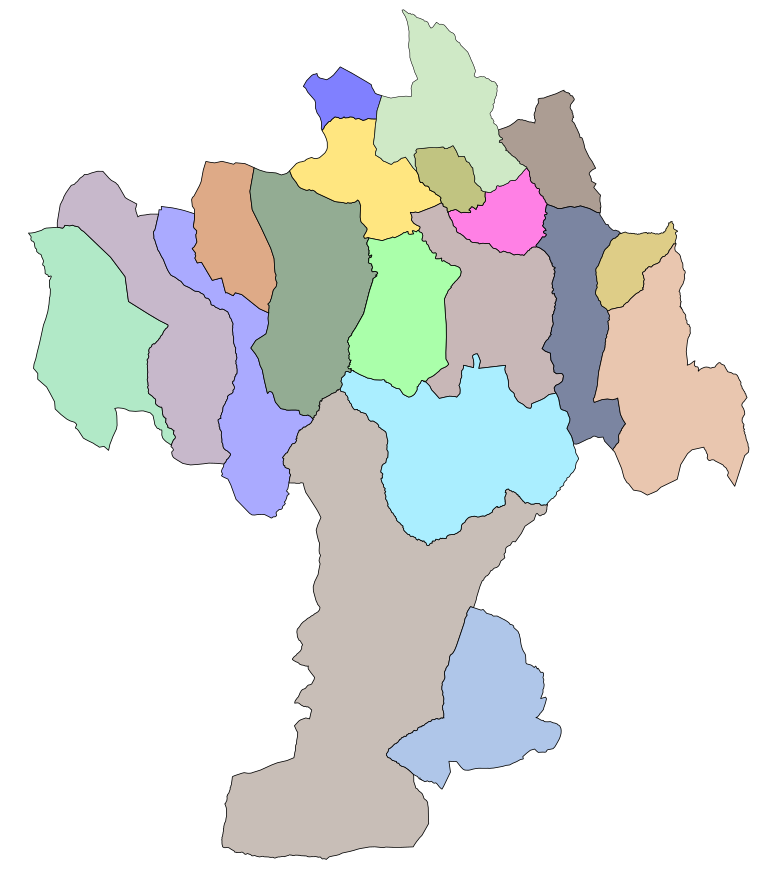
Map of Vedensky District. Agishbatoy is in the north

Agishbatoy is located on the right bank of the Bulk River. It is 15 kilometres (9.3 mi) north-east of the village of Vedeno.

The nearest settlements to Agishbatoy are Guni in the north, Kurchali and Mesedoy in the north-east, Belgatoy in the south-east, Vedeno in the south, Oktyabrskoye in the south-west, and Khazhi-Yurt and Tsa-Vedeno in the north-west.

== History ==
Agishbatoy is the ancestral village of the Egishbatoy teip (clan).

According to legend, the name of the village comes from the names of two brothers, Egash and Beta, who moved here from the mountain village of Tsesa.

In 1944, after the genocide and deportation of the Chechen and Ingush people and the Chechen-Ingush ASSR was abolished, the village of Agishbatoy was renamed to Khushet, and settled by people from the neighboring republic of Dagestan. From 1944 to 1957, it was a part of the Vedensky District of the Dagestan ASSR.

In 1958, after the Vaynakh people returned and the Chechen-Ingush ASSR was restored, the village regained its old Chechen name, Agishbatoy.

== Population ==
- 2002 Census: 502
- 2010 Census: 686
- 2019 estimate: 790

According to the 2010 Census, the majority of residents of Agishbatoy were ethnic Chechens. The majority of the village's population are from the Egishbatoy teip.
