= Guni, Vedensky District =

Village in Vedensky District, Russia

Coordinates: 43°03′24″N 46°06′22″E

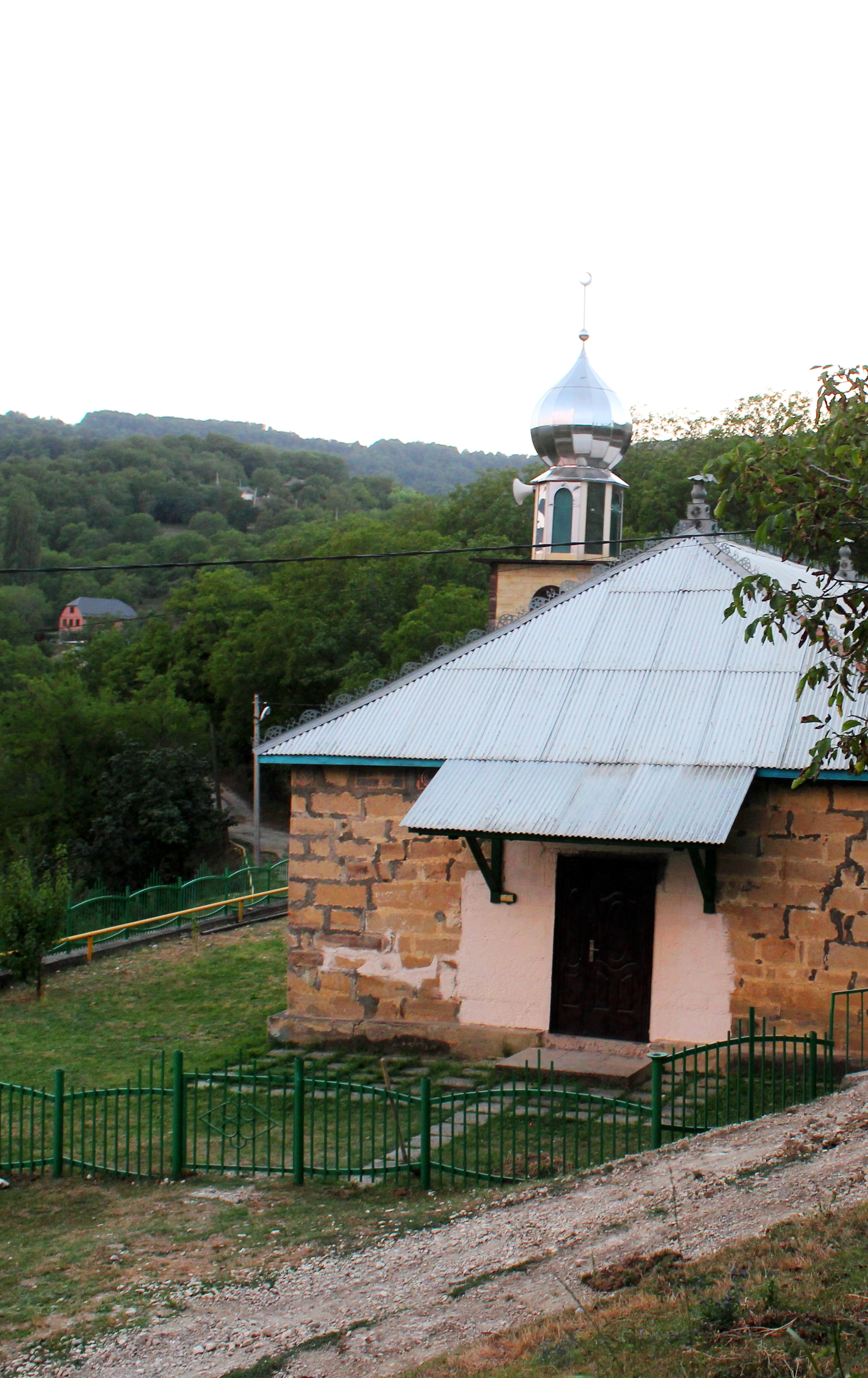
Guni, Vedensky District

Guni (Russian: Гуни, Chechen: Гуьна, Güna) is a rural locality (a selo) in Vedensky District, Chechnya.

== Administrative and municipal status ==
Municipally, Guni is incorporated into Guninskoye rural settlement. It is the administrative center of the municipality and one of the four settlements included in it.

== Geography ==
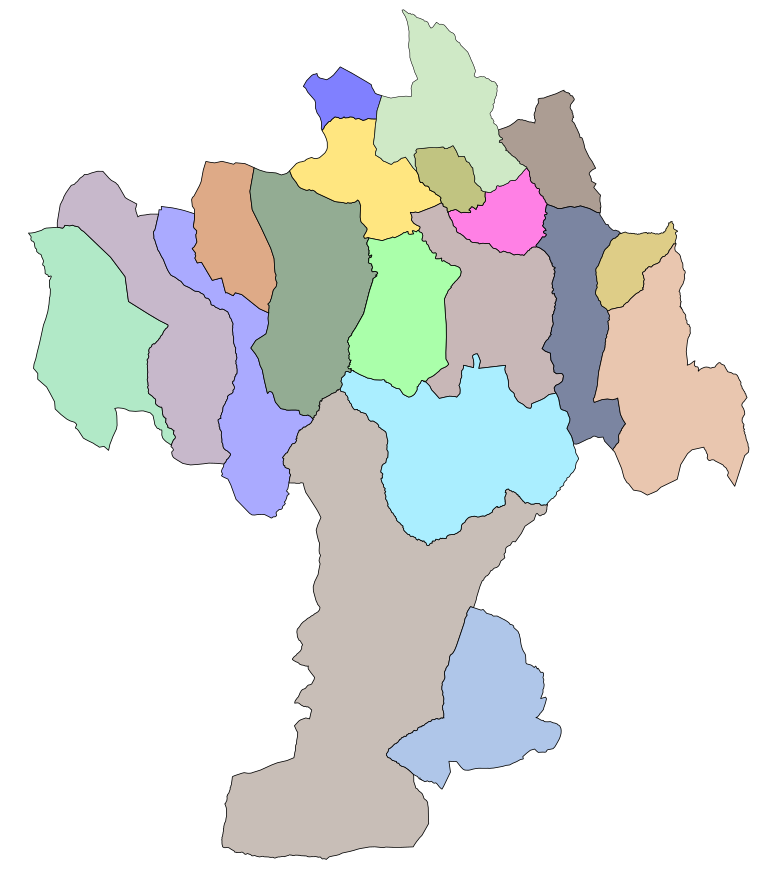
Map of Vedensky District. Guni is in the north

Guni is located between two of the left tributaries of the Gums River. It is located 18 kilometres (11 mi) north-east of Vedeno.

The nearest settlements to Guni are Serzhen-Yurt in the north-west, Marzoy-Mokhk in the north, Achereshki and Enikali in the north-east, Gezinchu in the east, Agishbatoy and Mesedoy in the south-east, and Khadzhi-Yurt in the south-west.

== History ==
In 1944, after the genocide and deportation of the Chechen and Ingush people and the Chechen-Ingush ASSR was abolished, the village of Guni was renamed to Tashi, and settled by people from the neighboring republic of Dagestan. From 1944 to 1957, it was a part of the Vedensky District of the Dagestan ASSR.

In 1958, after the Vaynakh people returned and the Chechen-Ingush ASSR was restored, the village regained its old Chechen name, Guna.

== Population ==
- 1990 Census: 1000
- 2002 Census: 647
- 2010 Census: 849
- 2019 estimate: ?

According to the 2010 Census, the majority of residents of Guni were ethnic Chechens.
