= Vedeno =

Village in Vedensky District, Russia

Coordinates: 42°57′25″N 46°06′37″E

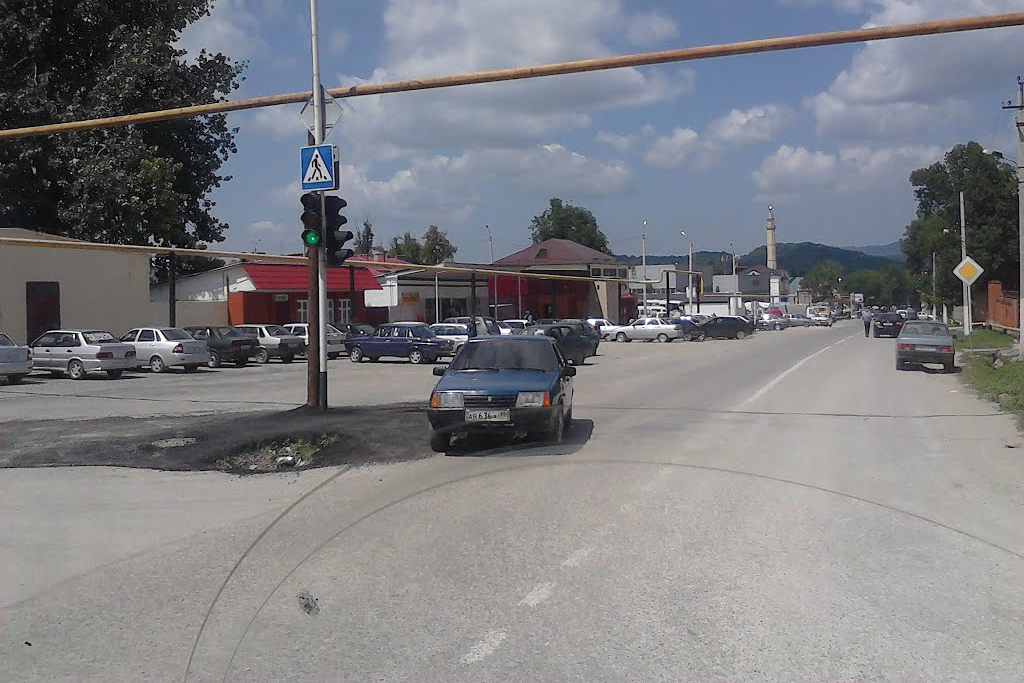
A view of Vedeno.

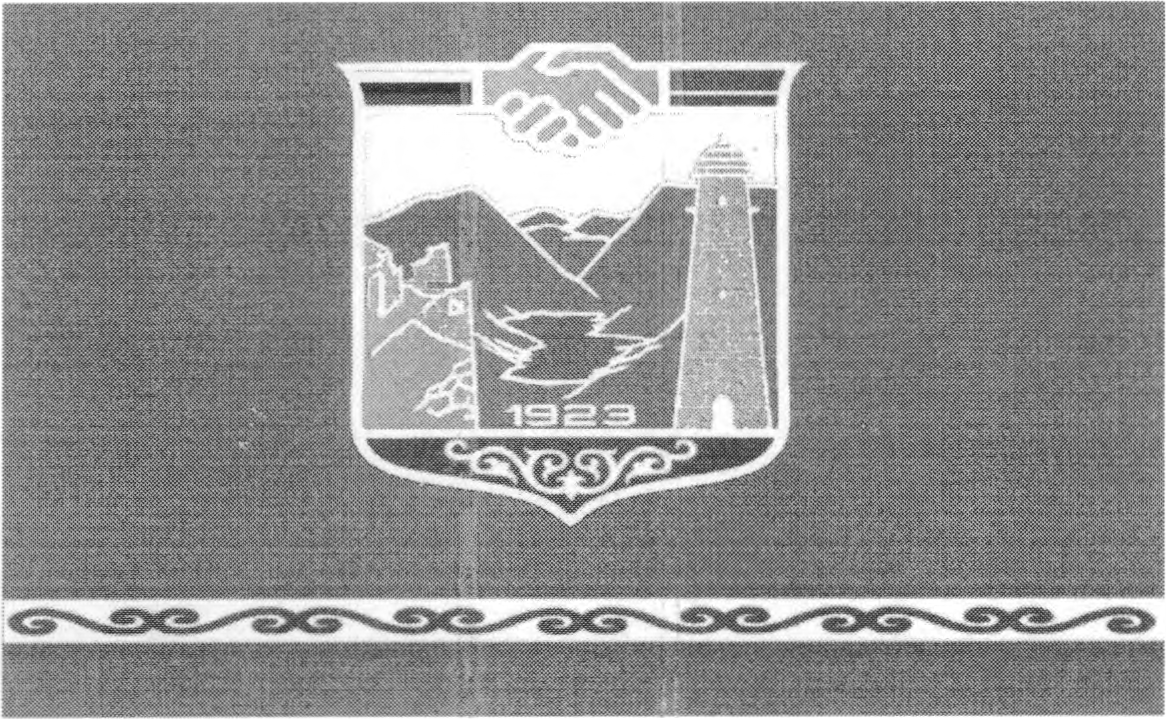
Flag of Vedeno

Vedeno (Russian: Ведено́; Chechen: Ведана, Vedana) is a rural locality (a selo) and the administrative center of Vedensky District, Chechnya.

== Administrative and municipal status ==
Municipally, Vedeno is incorporated into Vedenskoye rural settlement. It is the administrative center of the municipality and is one of the four settlements included in it. The village is also the administrative center of Vedensky District.

== Geography ==
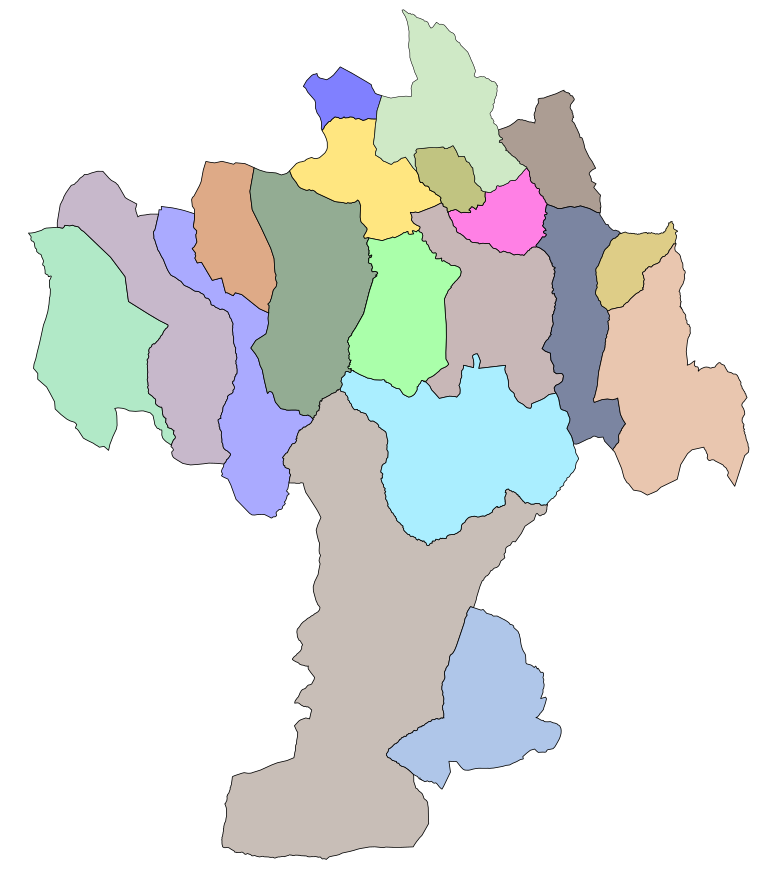
Map of Vedensky District. Vedeno is in the center

The village of Vedeno is located in the central part of Vedensky District, between the Akhkinchu and Khulkhulau rivers. It is located 67 kilometres (42 mi) south-east of the city of Grozny.

The nearest settlements to Vedeno are Ersenoy in the north-east, Dyshne-Vedeno in the south-east, Mekhkadettan-Irze in the south-west, Eshilkhatoy in the west, and Zelamkhin-Kotar in the north-west.

The village is located at an average altitude of 722 meters above sea level. To the south, the Khoroch ridge rises above Vedeno, with the mountain peak of the same name.

The climate of Vedeno is humid and temperate, due to the proximity of the Main Caucasian Range. The average annual air temperature is +9.0°C and ranges from averages of +21.5°C in July, to −4.0°C in January. The average annual rainfall is around 660mm.

== History ==
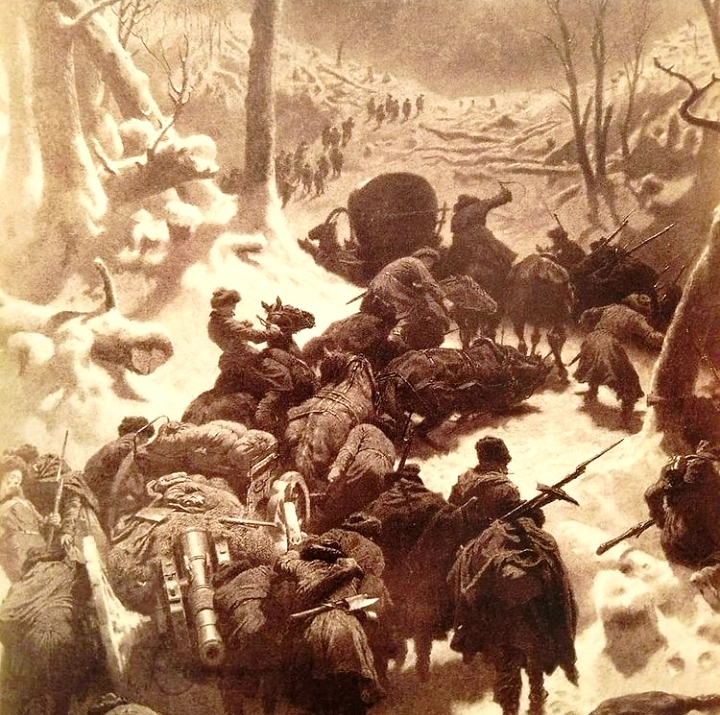
Expedition to the Vedeno, by Theodor Horschelt 1859

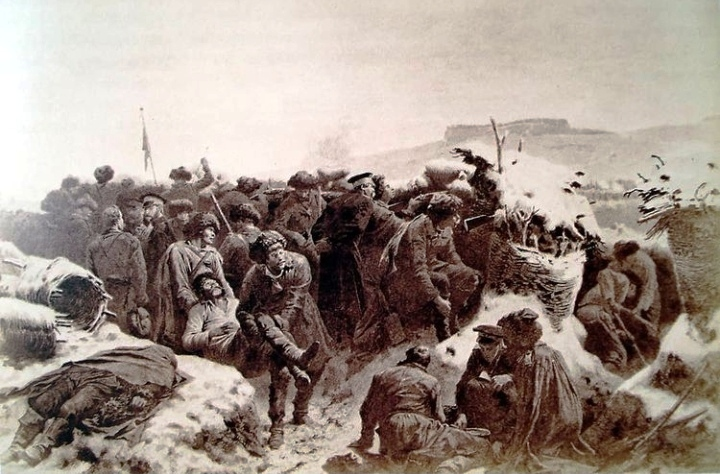
The siege of the village of Vedenya, by Theodor Horschelt 1859

In the 19th century, Vedeno was the last capital of the Caucasian Imamate, an Islamic territory which existed in the territory of Dagestan and Chechnya from 1829 to 1859.

In the mid-19th century, Imam Shamil led his guerrilla army in a twenty-year war against the Imperial Russian army and fought a last stand in Vedeno. The village was captured by Russian forces on 1 April 1859. As a result, a fortress was built in the village. During the Russian Empire, the settlement was the administrative capital of the Vedensky Okrug of the Terek Oblast.

From September 1919 to March 1920, the village was the capital of the North Caucasian Emirate, an Islamic state which appeared in the territory of Chechnya and western Dagestan. Money was printed for the emirate in Vedeno. There were several different types of paper used for the money, including pages from school books.

In 1944, after the genocide and deportation of the Chechen and Ingush people and the Chechen-Ingush ASSR was abolished, Vedeno was one of the very few villages which was not renamed and had its original name preserved. However, on 7 June 1944, the Vedensky District was transferred to the Dagestan ASSR, with Vedeno as the administrative center.

In 1957, after the Vaynakh people returned from the deportation, Vedensky District returned to the restored Chechen-Ingush ASSR with Vedeno as the district center.

During the First Chechen War, Vedeno was under the control of the Chechen Republic of Ichkeria until 3 June 1995, when it was taken by Russian troops, who controlled it until the end of the war.

During the Second Chechen War, on 17 November 1999, the Russian troops suffered their first losses in the mountain village. The 31st Separate Airborne Brigade lost 12 paratroopers in a battle here. Vedeno was taken again by Russian troops on 11 January 2000.

In August 2001, separatists led by Ibn Khattab ambushed and engaged in battle with Russian troops in the village, during which the military commandant's office was attacked.

In March 2006, more battles took place in the vicinity of Vedeno. More than 3,000 Chechen police and OMON units were sent there, and were opposed by the units of Shamil Basayev and Dokku Umarov.

== Population ==
- 1959 Census: 1,606
- 1970 Census: 2,234
- 1979 Census: 2,282
- 1989 Census: 2,504
- 1990 Census: 2,540
- 2002 Census: 1,469
- 2010 Census: 3,186
- 2019 estimate: ?

According to the results of the 2010 Census, the majority of residents of Vedeno were ethnic Chechens (2,257 people, or 70.84%). Other significant groups are Russians (323 people), Avars (140 people), Lezgins (106 people), Tabasarans (58 people) and Kumyks (54 people). 234 people came from other ethnic backgrounds and 14 people did not specify their nationality.

== Notable people ==
- Ibragim-Bek Sarakaev, writer and historian
- Shamil Basayev, senior Chechen rebel leader of the Chechen Republic of Ichkeria
