= Vedensky District =

Vedensky District Веденский район (Russian)
- District

Other transcription(s)
  - Chechen: Веданан кӏошт
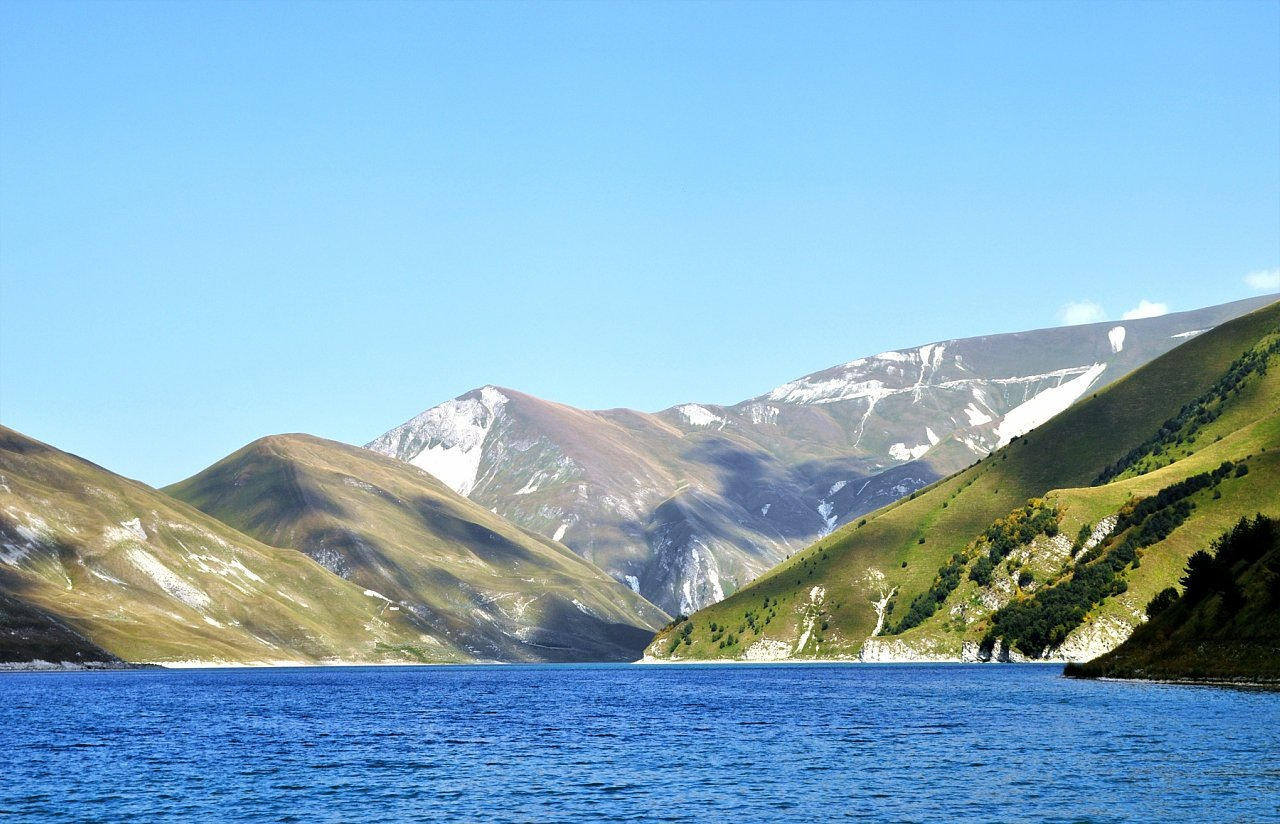
- Lake Kezenoyam, the deepest lake in the Caucasus Mountains, is located mostly in Vedensky District

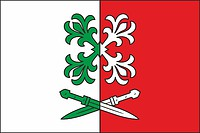
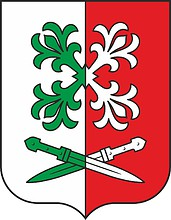
- Flag Coat of arms
- Location of Vedensky District in the Chechen Republic
- Coordinates: 42°57′13″N 46°06′47″E
- Country: Russia
- Federal subject: Chechen Republic
- Established: 1923
- Administrative center: Vedeno

Area
  - Total: 956 km^{2} (369 sq mi)

Population (2010 Census)
  - Total: 36,801
  - Density: 38.5/km^{2} (99.7/sq mi)
  - Urban: 0%
  - Rural: 100%

Administrative structure
  - Administrative divisions: 19 rural administration
  - Inhabited localities: 49 rural localities

Municipal structure
  - Municipally incorporated as: Vedensky Municipal District
  - Municipal divisions: 0 urban settlements, 19 rural settlements
- Time zone: UTC+3 (MSK)
- OKTMO ID: 96604000
- Website: http://www.adminvedeno.ru/

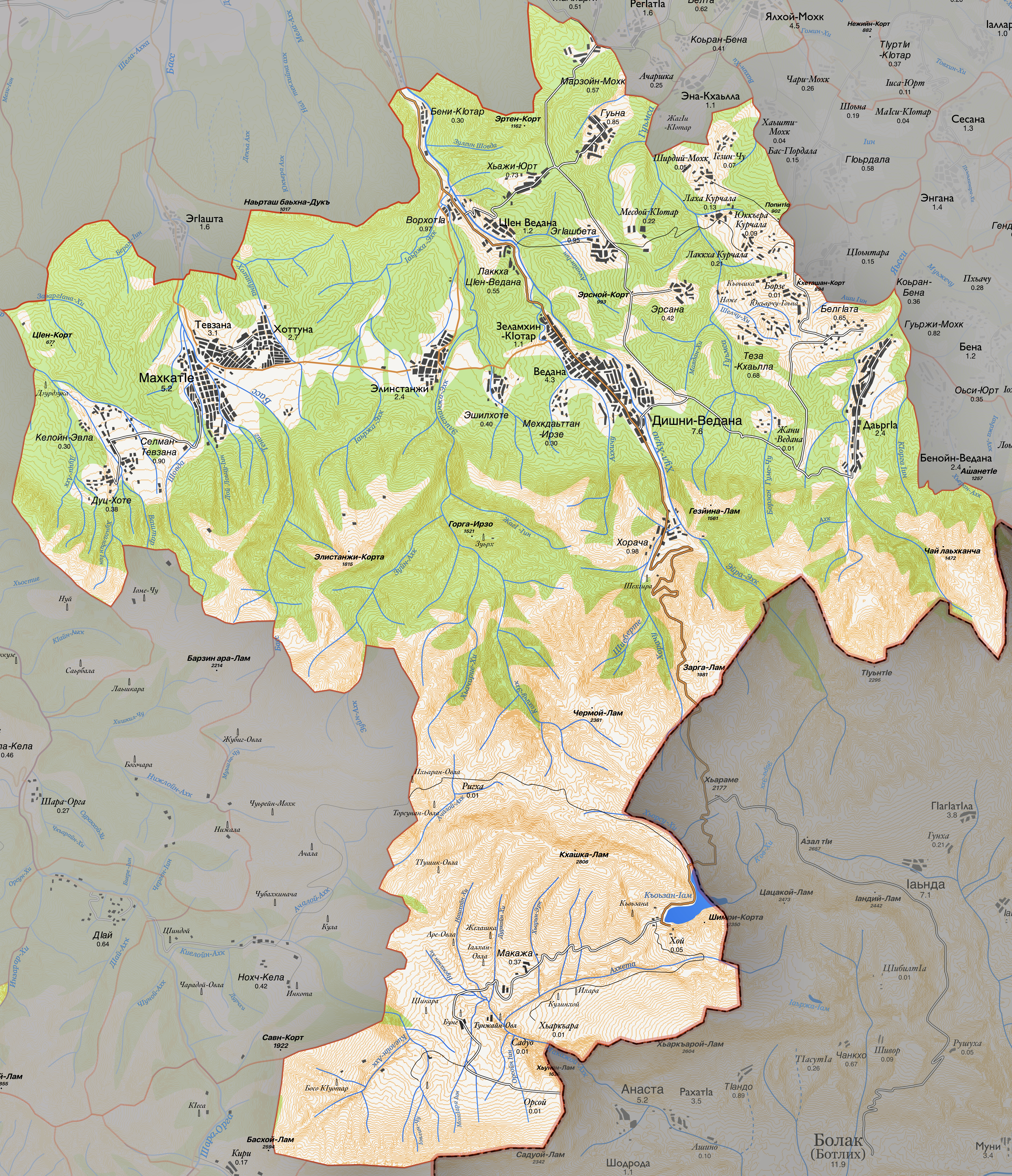
Map of the Vedensky District (in Chechen)

Vedensky District (Russian: Веде́нский райо́н; Chechen: Веданан кӏошт, Vedanan khoşt) is an administrative and municipal district (raion), one of the fifteen in the Chechen Republic, Russia. It is located in the southeast of the republic. The area of the district is 956 square kilometers (369 sq mi). Its administrative center is the rural locality (a selo) of Vedeno. Population: 36,801 (2010 census); 23,390 (2002 Census); 33,207 (1989 Soviet census). The population of Vedeno accounts for 8.7% of the district's total population.

== Healthcare ==
Severe health problems in the district are interlinked with the critical socio-economic situation in the region. As of 2005, access to district health services remains a problem due to the presence of federal and Chechen law enforcement and on-going military activities in the area. In 1999, it was reported that the influx of refugees to the district led to the rise of the population in the area from 30,000 before fighting began to about 90,000 according to reports from Chechnya.

== Notable people ==
Shamil Basayev was born in the selo of Dyshne-Vedeno.
