= Burka =

Burka or burqa may refer to:

- Burka (surname)

== Garments ==
- Burqa, a full body cloak worn by some Muslim women
- Burka (overcoat), a traditional men's overcoat made from felt or karakul
- Kobeniak, Ukrainian traditional garment

== Places ==
- Burqa, Ramallah, a village on the West Bank
- Burqa, Nablus, a village on the West Bank
- Burka District, in Baghlan province, Afghanistan
- Barqa, Gaza, Palestinian village, depopulated in 1948

== See also ==
- Burki (disambiguation)
- Birka (disambiguation)
- Burca (disambiguation)
- Barca (disambiguation)
- Burqa (2023 film), a 2023 Indian film
