= Barca =

Barca or Barce may refer to:

== Places ==
- Barca (ancient city) or Barce, a Greek city in North Africa
- Barce, Greater Poland Voivodeship, a village in Greater Poland
- La Barca (municipality), Jalisco, Mexico
- Barqa, Gaza
- Barca (parish), a parish of Portugal
- Barca d'Alva, a village in Portugal
- Barca d'Alva railway station, train station in Portugal
- Bârca, a commune in Dolj County, Romania
- Košice-Barca, a city part of Košice, Slovakia
- Barca, Rimavská Sobota District, a village in southern Slovakia
- Barca, Soria, a municipality in Soria, autonomous community of Castile and León, Spain
- A Barca, an abandoned hamlet in Galicia, Spain

== Zoology ==
- Barce (bug), a genus of thread-legged bugs in the family Reduviidae
- Barca (butterfly), a genus of skippers in the family Hesperiidae

== Other uses ==
- "Barça" or FC Barcelona, a sports club in Barcelona, Spain
  - UB-Barça, a now-defunct Spanish basketball team once sponsored by FC Barcelona
- Barca (board game), a strategy board game
- Barca-longa, a two or three-masted lugger used in the Mediterranean

== People with the surname ==
- Barcids or Barca family, a prominent family in ancient Carthage
  - Hamilcar Barca (275–228 BC), general and statesman, father of Hannibal, Hasdrubal, and Mago
  - Hannibal Barca (247 – c. 181 BC), military commander
  - Hasdrubal Barca (245–207 BC), military commander
  - Mago Barca (243–203 BC), military commander
- Aija Barča (born 1949), Latvian pedagogue and politician
- Fabrizio Barca (born 1954), Italian politician
- Giovanni Battista Barca (1594–1650), Italian Baroque painter
- Mike Barca (born 1954), American soccer goalkeeper
- Peter W. Barca (born 1955), Democratic politician from the U.S. state of Wisconsin
- Roxana Bârcă (born 1988), Romanian long-distance runner
- Teodor Bârcă (fl. 1894–1918), Bessarabian politician
- Teodosie Bârcă (fl. 1894–1918), Bessarabian politician
- Vasile Bârcă (1884–1949), Moldovan politician

== See also ==
- Abantiades barcas, a moth of the family Hepialidae
- Barco (disambiguation)
- Barqa or Cyrenaica
- Burka (disambiguation)
- Marj, Libya, modern city on the site of ancient Barca
