= Birka (disambiguation) =

Birka was a Viking-age trading center in Sweden.

Birka may also refer to:

== Places ==
- Virk, Jalandhar, Punjab, India, a village sometimes known as Birka
- Wagh El Birket, a former red-light district in Cairo

== Ships ==
- Birka Line, an Ålandian shipping company
- MS Birka Stockholm, a cruise ship owned by Birka Line
- Birka Princess, a cruise ship built for Birka Line
- MS Birka Queen, the original name of the cruise ship MS Norwegian Majesty
- SS Main (1926), a German cargo ship renamed Birka in 1955
- A German hospital ship sunk during World War II by the submarine HMS Triden (N52)

== Other ==
- A font family designed by Franko Luin

== See also ==
- Burka (disambiguation)
- Burk (disambiguation)
- Berk (disambiguation)
- Birkaland (disambiguation)
