= Paddi Khalsa =

- village
- Location in Punjab, India Paddi Khalsa (India)
- Coordinates: 31.1745°N 75.7803°E
- Country: India
- State: Punjab
- District: Jalandhar

Languages
  - Official: Punjabi
- Time zone: UTC+5:30 (IST)
- Vehicle registration: PB-
- Coastline: 0 kilometres (0 mi)
- main language is Punjabi

Paddi Khalsa is a village in the tehsil of Phillaur, sub-tehsil of Goraya, Jalandhar district, in Punjab, India.

== Demographics ==
According to the 2001 Census, Paddi Khalsa has a population of 1,455 people. The village has 196 acres (0.79 km^{2}). Neighbouring villages include Virk, Jalandhar (also known as Birka), Indna Klaske, Meerapur, Kala, Paddi Jagir, Gohawar, Chachrari, Jamalpur, Mouli and Chachoki.

== History ==
It is said that the Soomal families living in the village originally settled from the neighbouring village of Mouli, which also has a number of families with the Soomal surname, also spelt Somal.

The village is famous for the Guru Nanak Mission Hospital, which was founded, funded, and built by Gurdev Singh Soomal. The charitable hospital offers local residence free medical services, and additionally holds an annual eye camp. The annual eye camp offers vision testing, free glasses, cataract eye removal surgery, and cancer screening as of 2017. Gurdev Singh Soomal donated his land, built, and dedicated his life to building and operating the hospital for locals. He donated much of his property to the villagers to have their own place of worship. He is survived by his six children, who carry out overseeing his charitable work.

Gurdev
