= Verkhny Kurchali =

Village in Vedensky District, Russia

Coordinates: 43°00′N 46°11′E

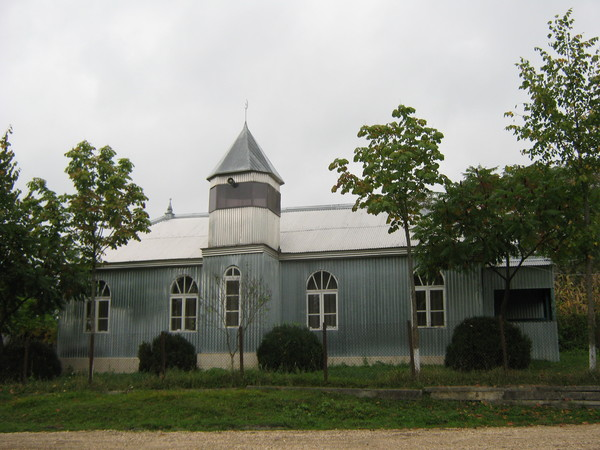
Verkhny Kurchali

Verkhny Kurchali (Russian: Верхние Курчали, Chechen: Лаккха-Курчалa, Lakqa-Kurçala) is a rural locality (a selo) in Vedensky District, Chechnya.

== Administrative and municipal status ==
Municipally, Verkhny Kurchali is incorporated into Kurchalinskoye rural settlement. It is the administrative center of the municipality and is one of the six settlements included in it.

== Geography ==
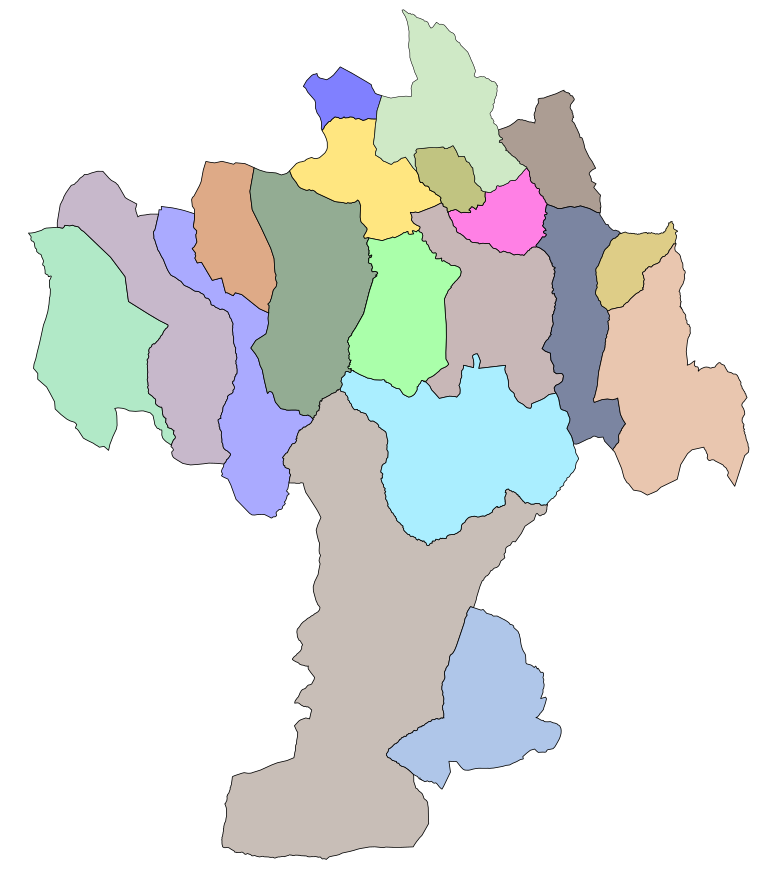
Map of Vedensky District. Verkhny Kurchali is in the north-east

Verkhny Kurchali is located on the left bank of the Gums River. It is 40 kilometres (25 mi) north-east of Vedeno.

The nearest settlements to Verkhny Kurchali are Bas-Gordan and Gordali in the north-east, Sredny Kurchali and Nizhny Kurchali in the north-west, Yukarchoy-Gonkha in the south, Ersenoy in the south-west, Barze in the south-west, and Mesedoy in the west.

== History ==
In 1944, after the genocide and deportation of the Chechen and Ingush people and the Chechen-Ingush ASSR was abolished, the village of Verkhny Kurchali was renamed to Verkhny Kolob, and settled by ethnic Avars from the neighboring republic of Dagestan. From 1944 to 1958, it was a part of the Vedensky District of the Dagestan ASSR.

In 1958, after the Vaynakh people returned and the Chechen-Ingush ASSR was restored, the village regained its old Chechen name, Verkhny Kurchali.

== Population ==
- 1990 Census: 270
- 2002 Census: 0
- 2010 Census: 218
- 2019 estimate: ?

The village had been abandoned due to the Chechen wars at the 2002 census, but many people had returned by 2010.
