= Ghilianella phasma =

Scientific classification
- Kingdom: Animalia
- Phylum: Arthropoda
- Class: Insecta
- Order: Hemiptera
- Suborder: Heteroptera
- Family: Reduviidae
- Genus: Ghilianella
- Species: G. phasma

Binomial name
- Ghilianella phasma Distant

Species of true bug

Ghilianella phasma is a species of assassin bug in the subfamily Emesinae. It is found on the Indian subcontinent and in Myanmar. There is some debate about whether this species may belong in the genus Schidium. William Lucas Distant placed the species in Ghilianella but Ernst Evald Bergroth and Pedro Wygodzinsky moved it to Schidium. In his 1990 work of the Reduviidae of the world, Moldonado doubted the Schidium placement.
