= Barce uhleri =

Scientific classification
- Domain: Eukaryota
- Kingdom: Animalia
- Phylum: Arthropoda
- Class: Insecta
- Order: Hemiptera
- Suborder: Heteroptera
- Family: Reduviidae
- Tribe: Metapterini
- Genus: Barce
- Species: B. uhleri

Binomial name
- Barce uhleri Banks, 1909

Species of true bug

Barce uhleri is a species of thread-legged bug in the family Reduviidae. It is found in North America.
