= Shirdi-Mokhk =

Vendensky

Coordinates: 43°02′23″N 46°09′24″E

Shirdi-Mokhk (Russian: Шерды-Мохк, Chechen: Ширдий-Мохк, Şirdiy-Moxk) is a rural locality (a selo) in Vedensky District, Chechnya.

== Administrative and municipal status ==
Municipally, Shirdi-Mokhk is incorporated into Kurchalinskoye rural settlement. It is one of the six settlements included in it.

== Geography ==
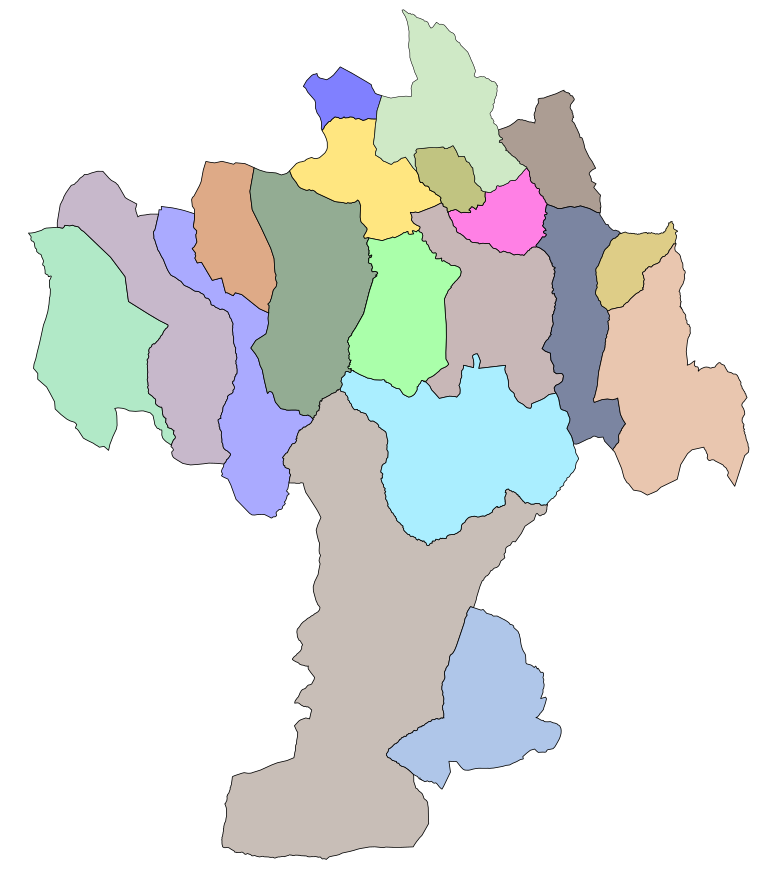
Map of Vedensky District. Shirdi-Mokhk is in the Nizhny Kurchali rural settlement

Shirdi-Mokhk is located on the right bank of the Gums River. It is located 40 kilometres (25 mi) north-east of the village of Vedeno.

The nearest settlements to Shirdi-Mokhk are Enikali in the north, Gezinchu in the north-east, Bas-Gordali in the east, Nizhny Kurchali in the south, Mesedoy in the south-west, and Guni in the north-west.

== Name ==
The village is considered as a general center for the Shirdiy teip (a part of the Nokhckmakhkakhoy tukkhum), whose name may have originated at the Chechen word "ширдолг", which translates roughly as "slingshot". This means that the name of the clan may mean "warriors armed with slingshots". The name of the village comes from the name of the clan, with the ending "-мохк", which translates from Chechen as "country" or "nation" or "territory". There is another version of how the village got its name - in the Kalmyk language, "ширди" roughly meant "people who dressed in quilted felt", which may describe burkas.

== History ==
In 1944, after the genocide and deportation of the Chechen and Ingush people and the Chechen-Ingush ASSR was abolished, the village of Shirdi-Mokhk was renamed to Pervomaysk, and settled by people from the neighboring republic of Dagestan. From 1944 to 1957, it was a part of the Vedensky District of the Dagestan ASSR.

In 1958, after the Vaynakh people returned and the Chechen-Ingush ASSR was restored, the village regained its old Chechen name, Shirdi-Mokhk.

== Population ==
- 1990 Census: 275
- 2002 Census: 0
- 2010 Census: 54

At the time of the 2002 Census, Shirdi-Mokhk had been abandoned due to the Chechen Wars, but by the 2010 Census, some of the population had returned.

According to the results of the 2010 Census, the majority of residents of Shirdi-Mokhk were ethnic Chechens.
