= Johann Becker =

Johann Becker may refer to:

- Johann Becker (organist) (1726–1803), German organist
- Johann Becker (politician) (1869–1951), German politician
- Johann Becker (entomologist) (1932–2004), Brazilian entomologist
- Johann Philip Becker (1809–1886), German revolutionary
