= Kobeniak =

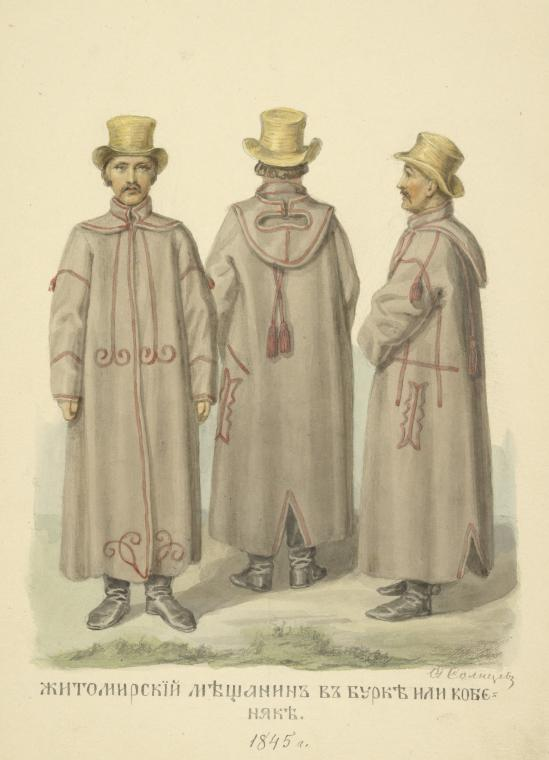
A Zhytomyr burgher wearing burka or kobenyak, 1845

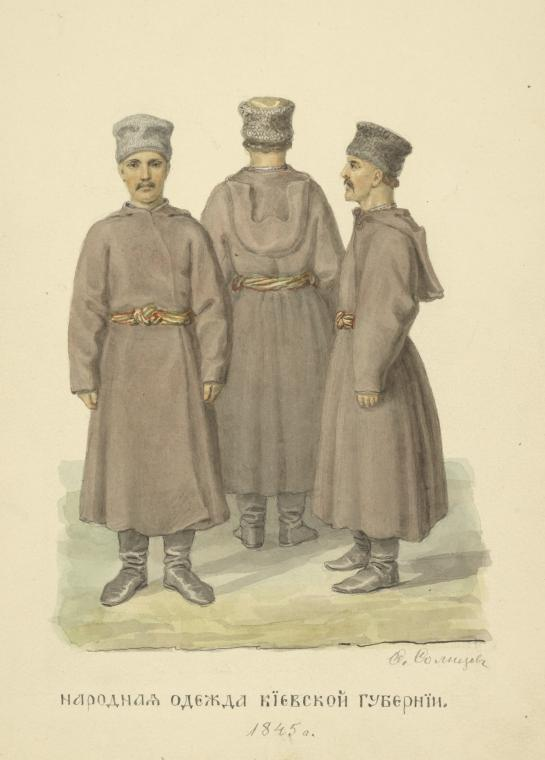
Traditional dress of Kiev Governorate, 1845

Kobeniak (Кобеняк) is a Ukrainian traditional male outer garment. Similar terms are Hungarian köpönyeg for "cloak", "mantle", "overcoat", and a historical Polish garment, kopieniak, all terms being derived from the Turkish garment kepenek, which is a shepherd's garment. Kobeniak is also called burka (cf. "Burka (overcoat)"), kireya, or siryak (бурка, кирея, сіряк).

A kobenyak was the widest garment, so that it could be worn even on top of a kozhukh (fur coat). A distinctive feature is a hood which could cover nearly all the face, with a cut for the eyes and possibly for the mouth, which may be folded back.
