= Sredny Kurchali =

Village in Vedensky District, Russia

Coordinates: 43°00′54″N 46°11′10″E

Sredny Kurchali (Russian: Средние Курчали, Chechen: Йукъерa-Курчала, Yuq̇era-Kurçala) is a rural locality (a selo) in Vedensky District, Chechnya.

== Administrative and municipal status ==
Municipally, Sredny Kurchali is incorporated into Kurchalinskoye rural settlement. It is one of the six settlements included in it.

== Geography ==
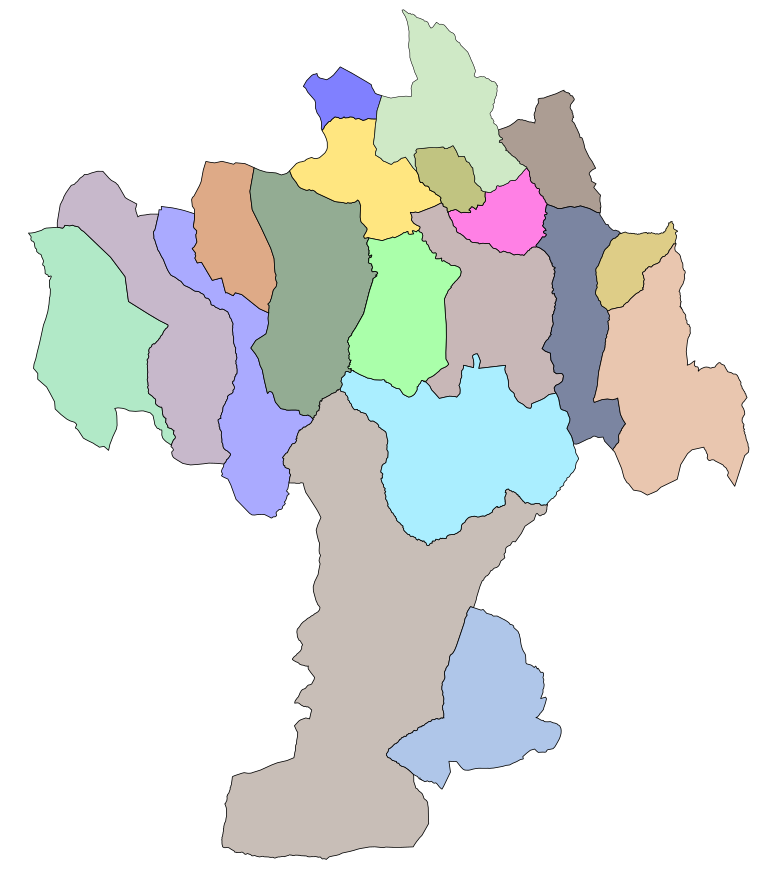
Map of Vedensky District. Sredny Kurchali is in the Kurchalinskoye rural settlement

Sredny Kurchali is located on the right bank of the Gums River. It is 40 kilometres (25 mi) north-east of Vedeno.

The nearest settlements to Sredny Kurchali are Nizhny Kurchali in the north-west, Bas-Gordali in the north-east, Tazen-Kala in the south, Tsentaroy and Verkhny Kurchali in the south-east, Ersenoy in the south-west, and Mesedoy in the west.

== History ==
In 1944, after the genocide and deportation of the Chechen and Ingush people and the Chechen-Ingush ASSR was abolished, the village of Sredny Kurchali was renamed to Kolob, and settled by people from the neighboring republic of Dagestan. From 1944 to 1957, it was a part of the Vedensky District of the Dagestan ASSR.

In 1958, after the Vaynakh people returned and the Chechen-Ingush ASSR was restored, the village regained its old Chechen name, Sredny Kurchali.

== Population ==
- 1990 Census: 178
- 2002 Census: 566
- 2010 Census: 92
- 2019 estimate: ?

According to the results of the 2010 Census, the majority of residents of Sredny Kurchali were ethnic Chechens.
