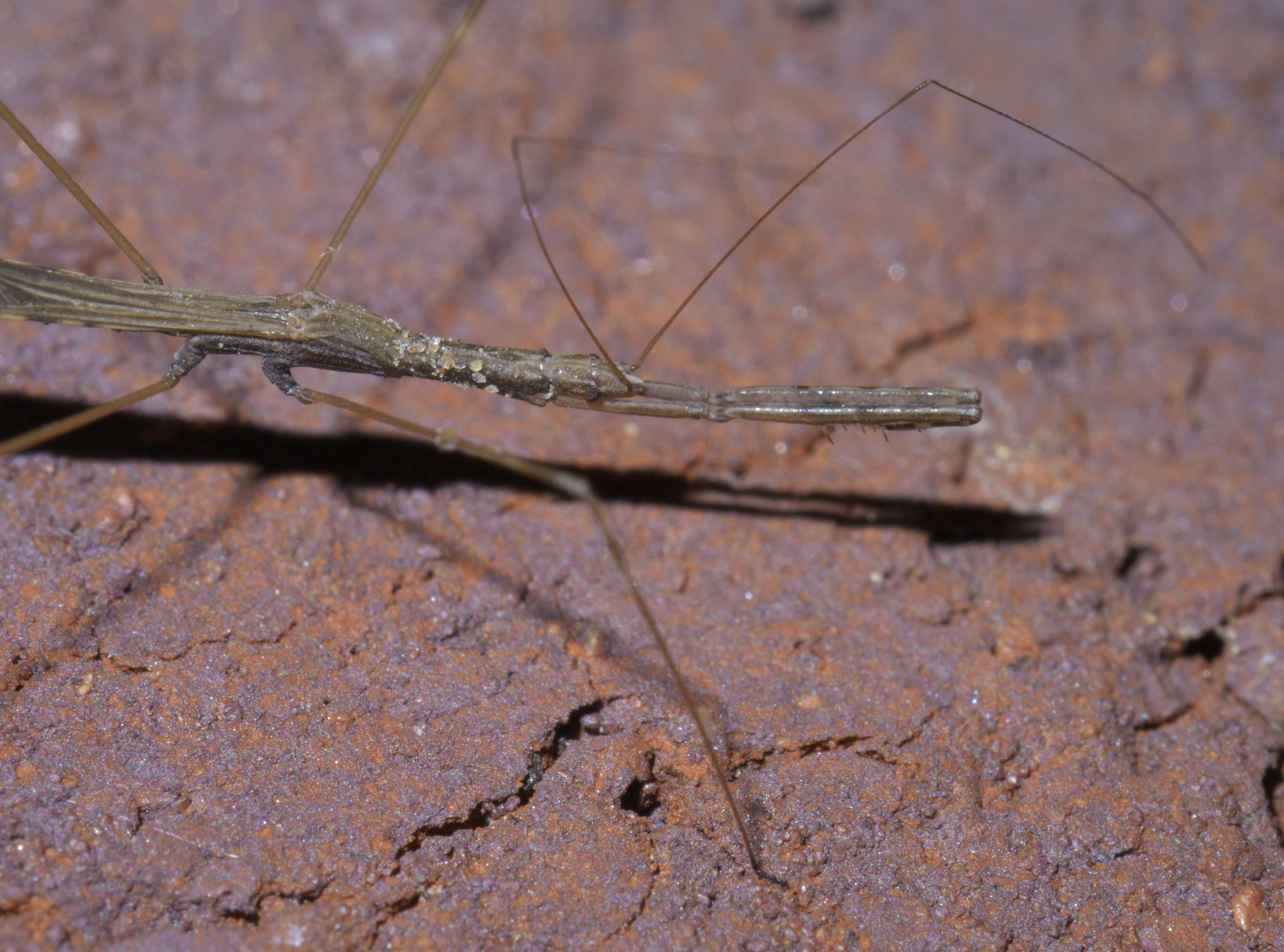
- Barce fraterna

Scientific classification
- Domain: Eukaryota
- Kingdom: Animalia
- Phylum: Arthropoda
- Class: Insecta
- Order: Hemiptera
- Suborder: Heteroptera
- Family: Reduviidae
- Tribe: Metapterini
- Genus: Barce
- Species: B. fraterna

Binomial name
- Barce fraterna (Say, 1832)

= Barce fraterna =

Species of true bug

Barce fraterna is a species of thread-legged bug in the family Reduviidae. It is found in the Caribbean, Central America, North America, and South America.

== Subspecies ==
These three subspecies belong to the species Barce fraterna:

- Barce fraterna annulipes Stål, 1867
- Barce fraterna banksii Baker, 1910
- Barce fraterna fraterna (Say, 1832)
