= Pseudometapterus =

Scientific classification
- Domain: Eukaryota
- Kingdom: Animalia
- Phylum: Arthropoda
- Class: Insecta
- Order: Hemiptera
- Suborder: Heteroptera
- Family: Reduviidae
- Tribe: Metapterini
- Genus: Pseudometapterus; Wygodzinsky, 1966

Genus of true bugs

Pseudometapterus is a little-known genus of thread-legged bug in the subfamily Emesinae. Members of the genus occur in North America and usually have wings that are extremely small or absent entirely, though a winged form of P. umbrosus is known from Southern Illinois.

== Partial species list ==
- Pseudometapterus argentinus Berg, 1900)
- Pseudometapterus butleri Wygodzinsky, 1966
- Pseudometapterus umbrosus (Blatchley, 1926)
- Pseudometapterus wygodzinskyi (Elkins, 1953)
