= Ghinallelia =

Scientific classification
- Domain: Eukaryota
- Kingdom: Animalia
- Phylum: Arthropoda
- Class: Insecta
- Order: Hemiptera
- Suborder: Heteroptera
- Family: Reduviidae
- Tribe: Metapterini
- Genus: Ghinallelia; Wygodzinsky, 1966

Genus of true bugs

Ghinallelia is a genus of thread-legged bugs in the family Reduviidae. There are at least two described species in Ghinallelia.

== Species ==
- Ghinallelia globifera (Bergroth, 1906)
- Ghinallelia productilis (Barber, 1914)
