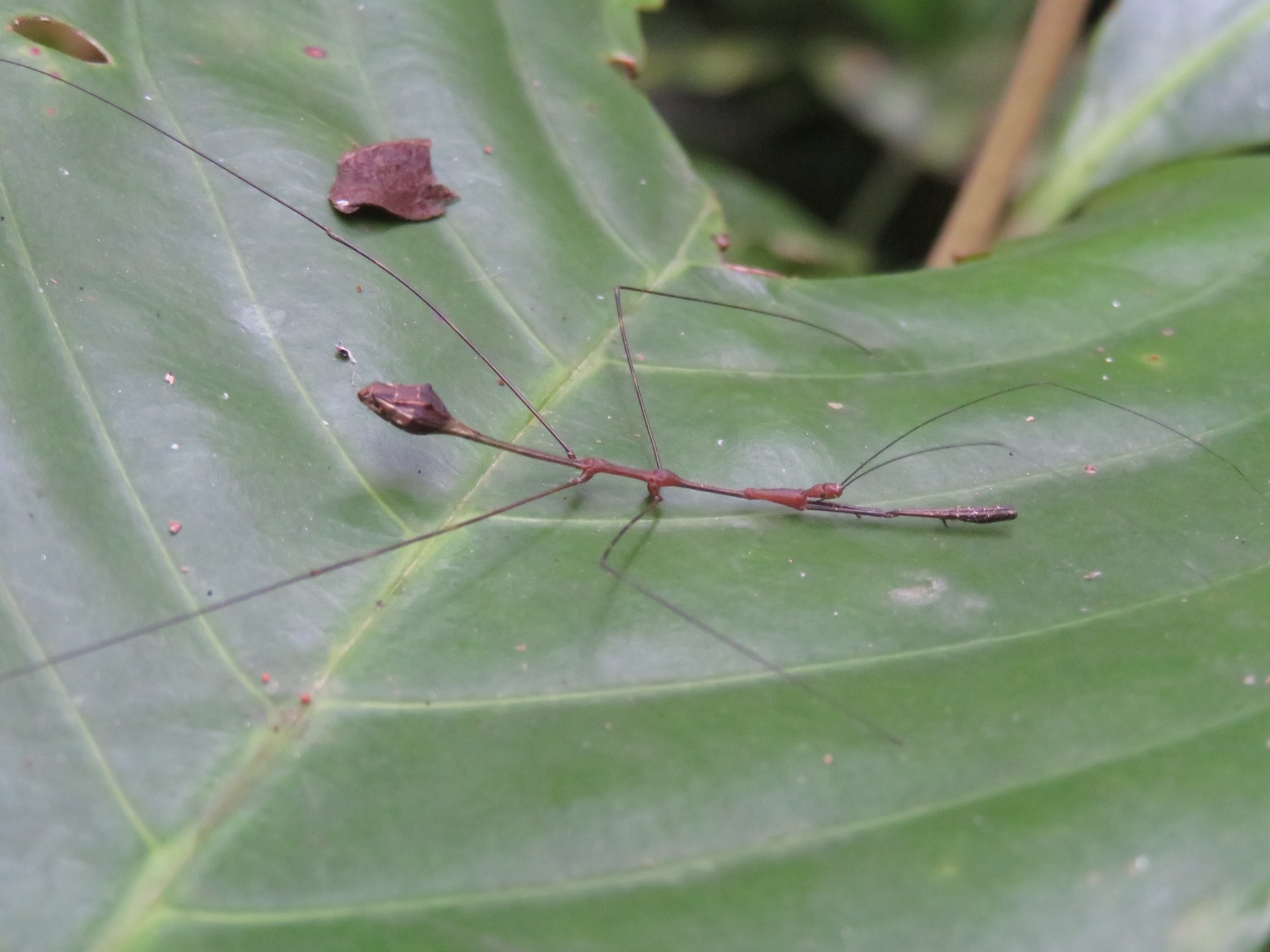
- Ghilianella clavellata

Scientific classification
- Kingdom: Animalia
- Phylum: Arthropoda
- Class: Insecta
- Order: Hemiptera
- Suborder: Heteroptera
- Family: Reduviidae
- Subfamily: Emesinae
- Tribe: Metapterini
- Genus: Ghilianella; Spinola, 1835

= Ghilianella =

Genus of true bugs

Ghilianella is a genus of true bugs in the subfamily Emesinae. Fifty-eight species have been described, with a combined distribution from Guatemala to Brazil. The linear form of the species in this genus allow the young larvae to be carried about by the mother or perhaps the father. The larvae of the young can curl around the parent's thorax.

Species of the genus can be recognized by the laterally acute prolonged apical last abdominal segments.

== Selected species ==
- Ghilianella approximata
- Ghilianella beckeri
- Ghilianella borincana
- Ghilianella mirabilis
- Ghilianella phasma
