= Pseudobargylia =

Scientific classification
- Kingdom: Animalia
- Phylum: Arthropoda
- Class: Insecta
- Order: Hemiptera
- Suborder: Heteroptera
- Family: Reduviidae
- Tribe: Metapterini
- Genus: Pseudobargylia

Genus of true bugs

Pseudobargylia is a little-known genus of thread-legged bug in the subfamily Emesinae. Species of this genus are not adapted for spiderwebs like some other members of the subfamily. Members of the genus occur in Tasmania and Australia. Tasmanian species of this genus are wingless, an unusual characteristic for true bugs.

== Partial species list ==
- Pseudobargylia alata
- Pseudobargylia iuncea
