= Pseudometapterus umbrosus =

Scientific classification
- Domain: Eukaryota
- Kingdom: Animalia
- Phylum: Arthropoda
- Class: Insecta
- Order: Hemiptera
- Suborder: Heteroptera
- Family: Reduviidae
- Genus: Pseudometapterus
- Species: P. umbrosus

Binomial name
- Pseudometapterus umbrosus Blatchley, 1926

Species of true bug

Pseudometapterus umbrosus is a species of assassin bug found in North America. It is univoltine in Illinois and overwinters as an adult. It has been reported from spider webs and plants (Heuchera parviflora) on sandstone and limestone bluffs. The vast majority of observed individuals are mictropterus, but in 2000, a macropterus (full-size winged) female was observed in Little Grand Canyon, Jackson County, Southern Illinois.
