= Ghilianella beckeri =

Scientific classification
- Domain: Eukaryota
- Kingdom: Animalia
- Phylum: Arthropoda
- Class: Insecta
- Order: Hemiptera
- Suborder: Heteroptera
- Family: Reduviidae
- Genus: Ghilianella
- Species: G. beckeri

Binomial name
- Ghilianella beckeri Gil-Santana, 2009

Species of true bug

Ghilianella beckeri is a species of assassin bug in the subfamily Emesinae found in Brazil. The species was described in 2009 and was found in the collection of the late professor Johann Becker (1932–2004).
