= Onychomesa =

Scientific classification
- Kingdom: Animalia
- Phylum: Arthropoda
- Class: Insecta
- Order: Hemiptera
- Suborder: Heteroptera
- Family: Reduviidae
- Subfamily: Emesinae
- Tribe: Metapterini
- Genus: Onychomesa; Wygodzinsky, 1966

Genus of true bugs

Onychomesa is a little-known genus of thread-legged bug in the subfamily Emesinae. Three species have been described, one from India, Japan, and Taiwan.

== Partial species list ==
- Onychomesa sauteri Wygodzinsky, 1966
- Onychomesa susainthani Wygodzinsky, 1966
- Onychomesa gokani Ishikawa, 2000
