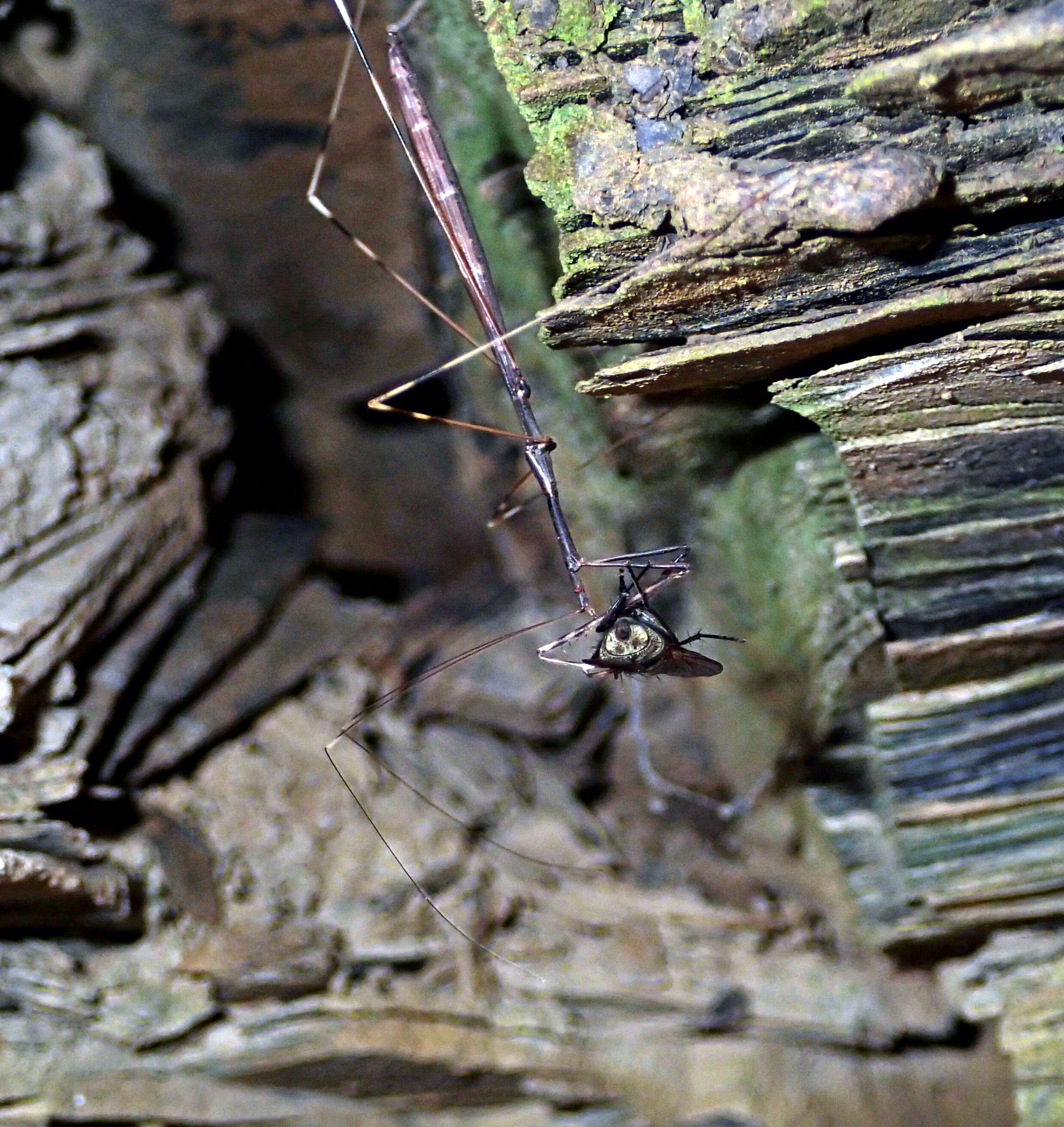
- Emesaya brevipennis

Scientific classification
- Kingdom: Animalia
- Phylum: Arthropoda
- Class: Insecta
- Order: Hemiptera
- Suborder: Heteroptera
- Family: Reduviidae
- Tribe: Metapterini
- Genus: Emesaya

= Emesaya =

Genus of true bugs

Emesaya is a genus of true bug in the subfamily Emesinae.

== Partial species list ==
- Emesaya brevipennis
