= Virk, Jalandhar =

Coordinates: 31°56′N 75°12′E

Virk Birka/Virka
- Village
- Interactive map of Virk
- Country: India
- State: Punjab
- District: Jalandhar
- Founder: Parmar from Rajput community and Manhas from Rajput community

Languages
  - Official: Punjabi
- Time zone: UTC+5:30 (IST)
- Postal code: 144632
- Vehicle registration: PB- 36
- Coastline: 0 kilometres (0 mi)

Virk is a village near Phagwara, but falls within Tehsil Phillaur, Jalandhar district, in Punjab, India.

== Demographics ==
According to the 2001 Census, Virk has a population of 5,195. Neighbouring villages include Chachoki, Indna Klaske, Paddi Khalsa, Jamalpur and Mouli.
