= Ghilianella borincana =

Scientific classification
- Kingdom: Animalia
- Phylum: Arthropoda
- Clade: Pancrustacea
- Class: Insecta
- Order: Hemiptera
- Suborder: Heteroptera
- Family: Reduviidae
- Genus: Ghilianella
- Species: G. borincana

Binomial name
- Ghilianella borincana

Species of true bug

Ghilianella borincana is a species of true bug found in semi-evergreen forest of Puerto Rico. It is highly cryptic, using catalepsis.
