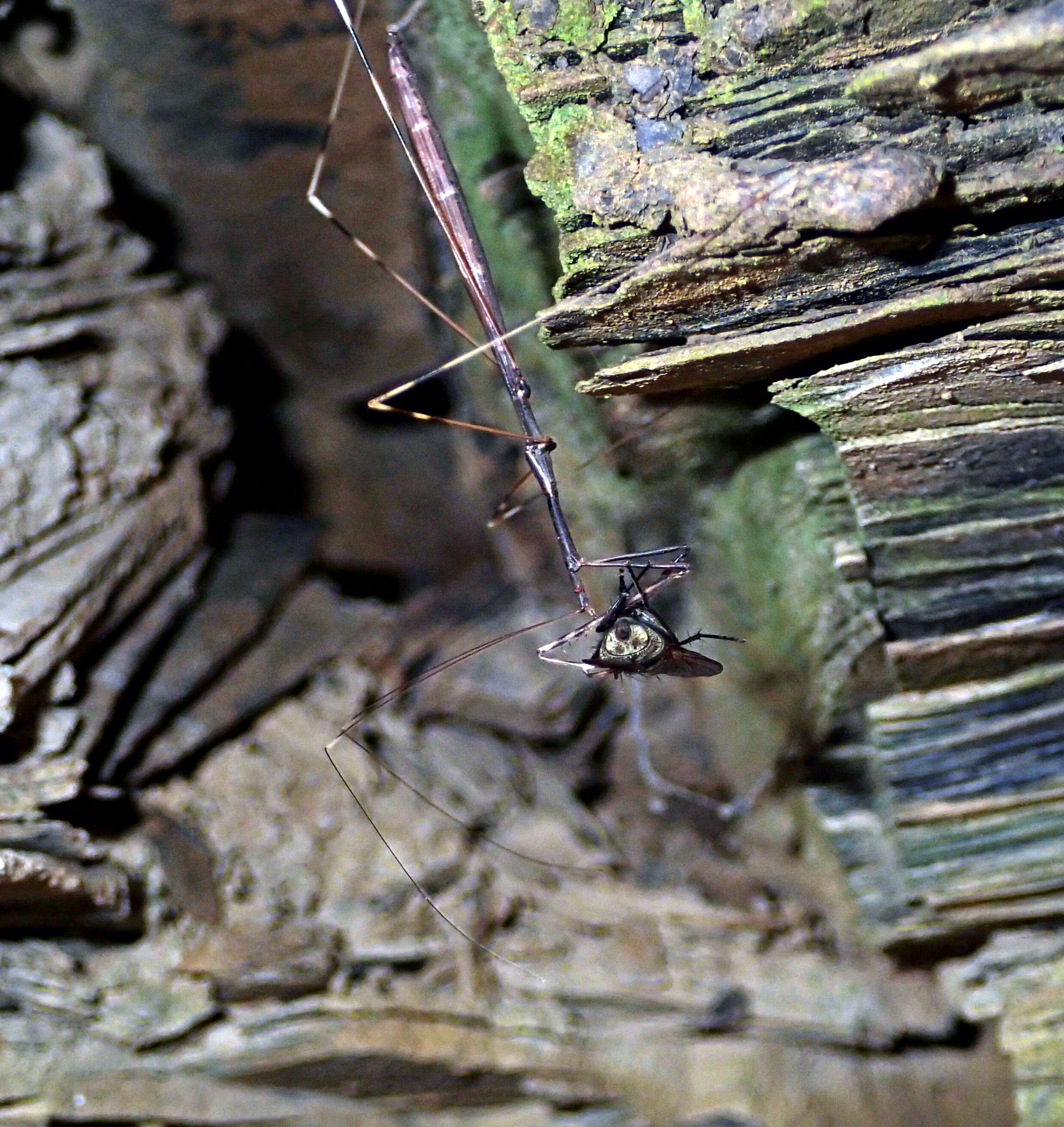

Scientific classification
- Kingdom: Animalia
- Phylum: Arthropoda
- Clade: Pancrustacea
- Class: Insecta
- Order: Hemiptera
- Suborder: Heteroptera
- Family: Reduviidae
- Genus: Emesaya
- Species: E. brevipennis

Binomial name
- Emesaya brevipennis (Say, 1832)

= Emesaya brevipennis =

Species of true bug

Emesaya brevipennis is a New World species of assassin bug in the subfamily Emesinae. There are three subspecies, all of which occur in North America north of Mexico.

The subspecies Emesaya b. brevipennis is the most widely distributed and is reported to be bivoltine in Southern Illinois. This subspecies has 5 instars.

E. brevipennis has been reported to rob spiders of their prey and to prey upon spiders. The species also will prey upon conspecifics, both in the larval and adult stage.
