= Ghinallelia productilis =

Scientific classification
- Domain: Eukaryota
- Kingdom: Animalia
- Phylum: Arthropoda
- Class: Insecta
- Order: Hemiptera
- Suborder: Heteroptera
- Family: Reduviidae
- Genus: Ghinallelia
- Species: G. productilis

Binomial name
- Ghinallelia productilis (Barber, 1914)

Species of true bug

Ghinallelia productilis is a species of thread-legged bug in the family Reduviidae. It is found in the Caribbean and North America.
