= Gezinchu =

Village in Vedensky District, Russia

Coordinates: 43°03′N 46°10′E

Gezinchu (Russian: Гезинчу, Chechen: Гезин-Чу, Gezin-Çu) is a rural locality (a selo) in Vedensky District, Chechnya.

== Administrative and municipal status ==
Municipally, Gezinchu is incorporated into Kurchalinskoye rural settlement. It is one of the six settlements included in it.

== Geography ==
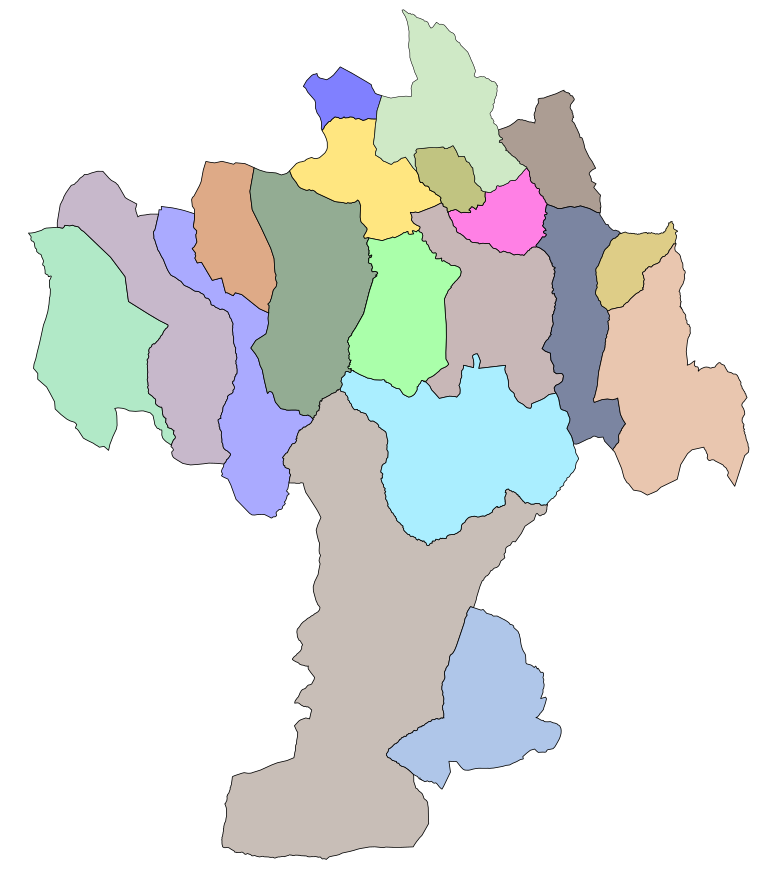
Map of Vedensky District. Gezinchu is in the Kurchali rural settlement

Gezinchu is located on the border between Vedensky District and Kurchaloyevsky District. It is located 40 kilometres (25 mi) north-east of Vedeno.

The nearest settlements to Gezinchu are Enikali in the north-west, Khashki-Mokhk in the north-east, Bas-Gordali in the south-east, and Shirdi-Mokhk in the south-west.

== History ==
In 1944, after the genocide and deportation of the Chechen and Ingush people and the Chechen-Ingush ASSR was abolished, the village of Gezinchu was renamed, and settled by people from the neighboring republic of Dagestan. From 1944 to 1958, it was a part of the Vedensky District of the Dagestan ASSR.

In 1958, after the Vaynakh people returned and the Chechen-Ingush ASSR was restored, the village regained its old Chechen name, Gezinchu.

== Population ==
- 1990 Census: 125
- 2002 Census: 136
- 2010 Census: 73
- 2019 estimate: 140

According to the 2010 Census, the majority of residents of Gezinchu were ethnic Chechens.
