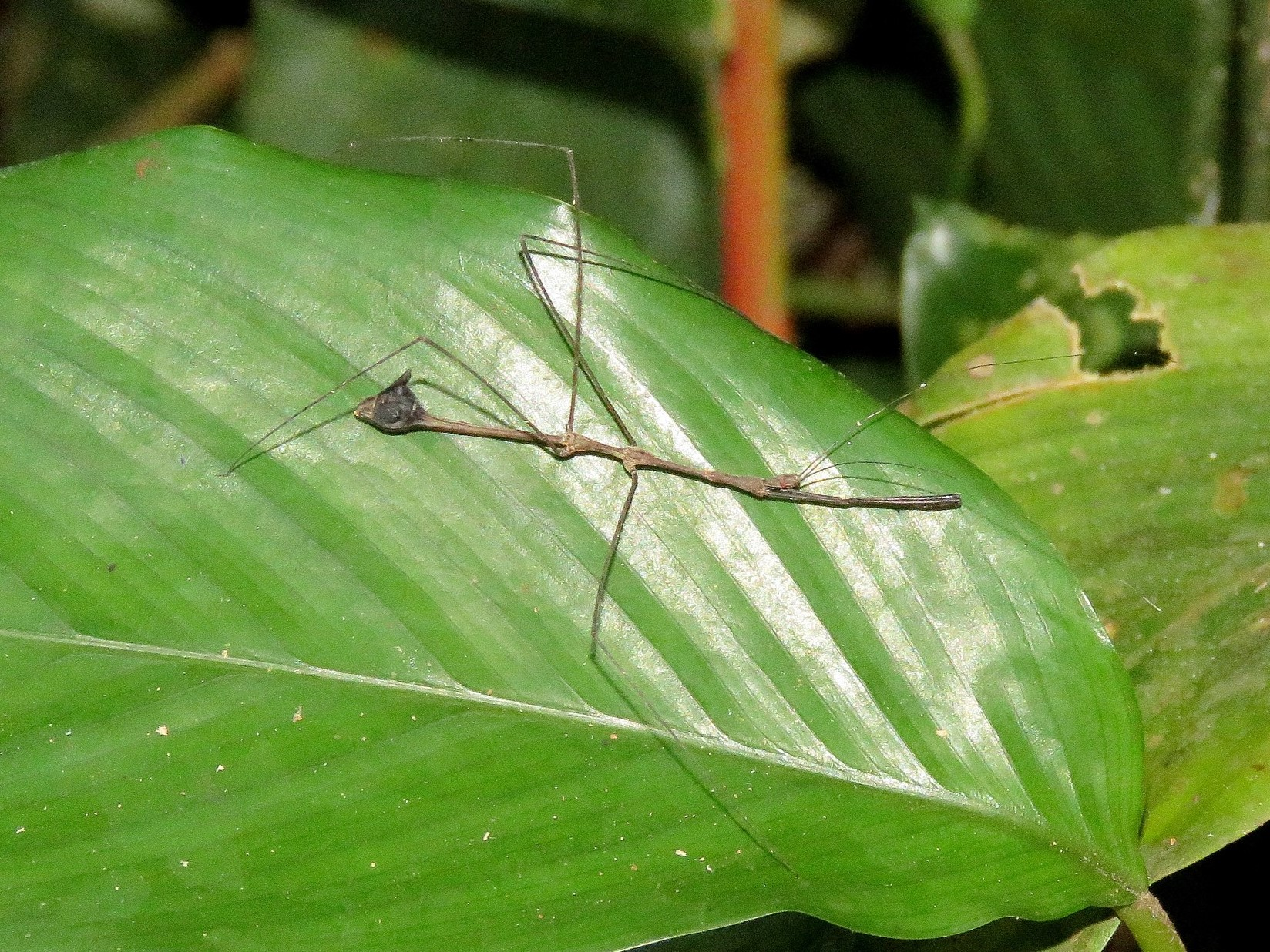

Scientific classification
- Kingdom: Animalia
- Phylum: Arthropoda
- Class: Insecta
- Order: Hemiptera
- Suborder: Heteroptera
- Family: Reduviidae
- Genus: Ghilianella
- Species: G. mirabilis

Binomial name
- Ghilianella mirabilis McAtee & Malloch, 1925

= Ghilianella mirabilis =

Species of true bug

Ghilianella mirabilis is a species of true bug found in the Amazon basin.
