= Schidium =

Scientific classification
- Kingdom: Animalia
- Phylum: Arthropoda
- Class: Insecta
- Order: Hemiptera
- Suborder: Heteroptera
- Family: Reduviidae
- Tribe: Metapterini
- Genus: Schidium; Bergroth, 1916

Genus of true bugs

Schidium is a large genus within the subfamily Emesinae, distributed in the Palaearctic, Afrotropical, Oriental, and Australian Regions.

About 50 species have been described.

== Partial list of species ==
- Schidium confine Wygodzinsky, 1966
