= Birkaland =

Birkaland (Swedish for Pirkanmaa) is the name of a geographical region in Finland which can refer to:

- Pirkanmaa, a current Region of Finland
- Satakunta (historical province) - a historical Province of Sweden that covered much of modern Pirkanmaa
