= Barca, Soria =

Cueva de Ágreda
- Municipality
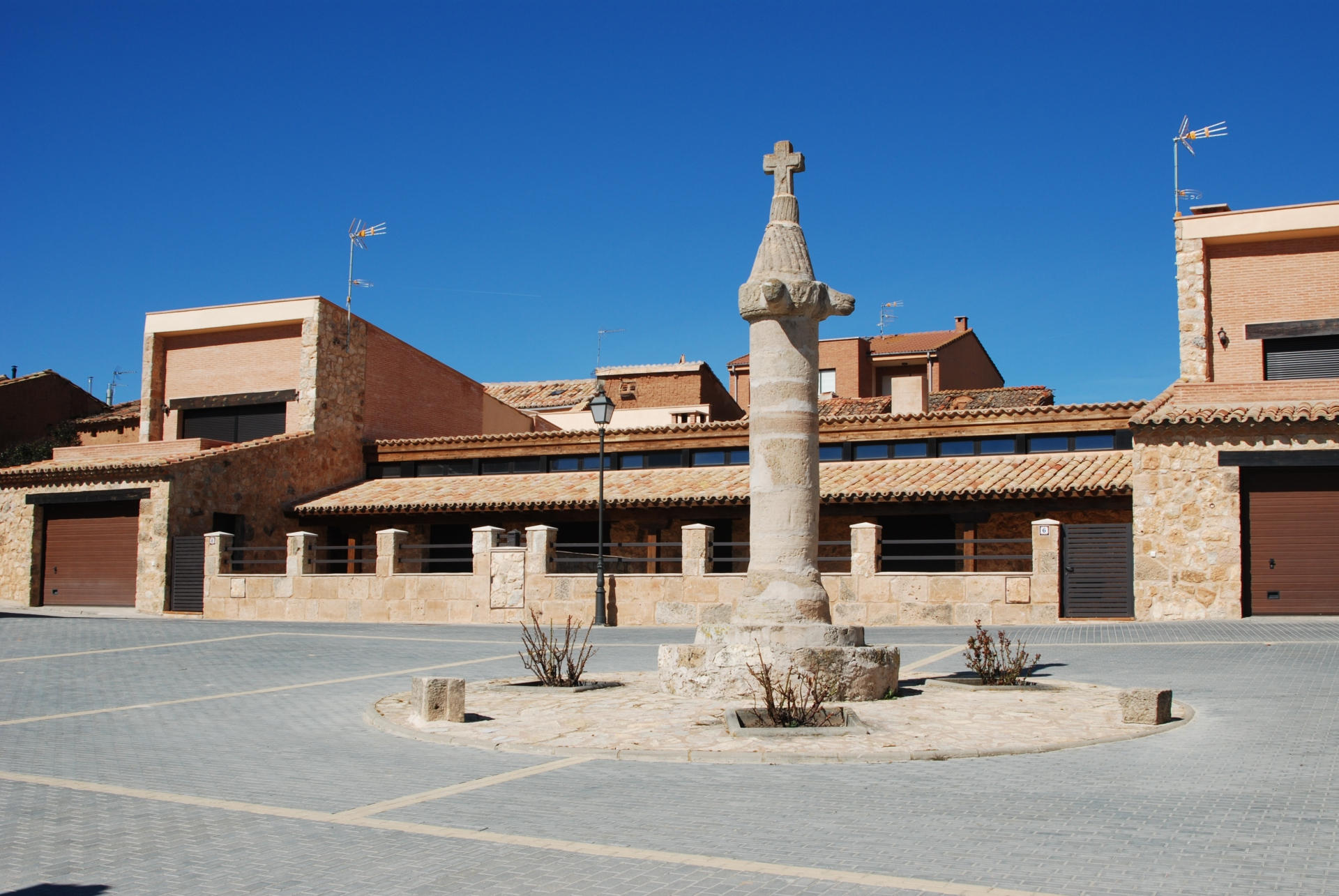

- Coat of arms

- Municipality of Barca in Soria

- Location in Spain. Cueva de Ágreda (Spain)
- Country: Spain
- Autonomous community: Castile and León
- Province: Soria
- Municipality: Caracena

Area
  - Total: 45.05 km^{2} (17.39 sq mi)
- Elevation: 965 m (3,166 ft)

Population (2025-01-01)
  - Total: 116
  - Density: 2.57/km^{2} (6.67/sq mi)
- Time zone: UTC+1 (CET)
  - Summer (DST): UTC+2 (CEST)
- Website: Official website

Barca is a municipality located in the province of Soria, in the autonomous community of Castile and León, Spain.

Included in the Natura 2000 network is a Site of Community Importance known as Riberas del Río Duero y afluentes (Riberas del Río Duero and tributaries), which occupies 43 hectares (110 acres).
