= SS Main =

Several steamships have borne the name Main:

- SS Main (1868) was a 3,087-ton single-screw ocean liner built in 1868 by Caird & Co., Greenock. New compound engines fitted in 1878. Owned 1868–1891 by the Norddeutscher Lloyd and 1891–1892 by the Anglo-American Steamship Co. On 23 March 1892, while on voyage from New Orleans to Liverpool with cattle and general cargo, destroyed by a fire at Prim Bay, Fayal, in the Azores and left to disintegrate.
- SS Main (1900) was a 10,058-ton ocean liner owned by Norddeutscher Lloyd. In service on the route from Bremen to Baltimore until seized by the Allies of World War I in 1914; involved in the 1900 Hoboken Docks fire. Awarded to the British Shipping Controller after the war, and operated by Turner, Brightman & Co. Scrapped in 1925.
- SS Main (1904) was a 715-ton cargo ship launched on 28 April 1904, by Mackie & Thomson in Govan, Scotland. Sold and renamed Marden in 1926, sunk in collision with The Sultan off Cromer Knoll on 27 May 1929.
- SS Main (1906) was a 2,662-ton cargo ship launched as Regina on 13 December 1906, by Flensburger Schiffbau-Gesellschaft in Flensburg, Germany. Sold and renamed Maria in 1921, sold again in 1924 and renamed Main. Finally resold in 1927 and renamed Milos. Struck a mine and sank off Kristiansand, Norway on 20 October 1944.
- SS Main (1926) was a 964-ton cargo ship completed in January 1927 by Stettiner Oderwerke in Stettin, Germany. Norwegian ownership under the name Røyksund from 1947, resold in 1955 to German owners and renamed Birka. Delivered to ship breakers for scrapping in April 1961.
- SS Main (1927) was a 7,624-ton passenger/cargo ship completed in January 1927 by Bremer Vulkan in Bremen-Vegesack, Germany, for Norddeutscher Lloyd. Requisitioned by the Kriegsmarine and used as a supply ship during the German invasion of Norway. Shelled and sunk by the Norwegian destroyer Draug off Haugesund on 9 April 1940.
