= Kepenek =

Traditional Turkish felt robe

A kepenek (also known regionally by various names such as Kurdish: kapank or ferencî) is a thick, tent-like traditional shepherd's outer garment. It is a sleeveless, buttonless garment made of felt worn on the shoulders and covering the whole body from the shoulders down. It is worn across Anatolia, the Zagros Mountains, the Caucasus, and parts of the broader Middle East.

It is made of three parts: one for the back and two (the same as the back, cut in half along the length) for the front. The parts are stitched together along the shoulder lines and all the way down. Usually white, a kepenek may have some adornments. Made from wool, or a combination of goat hair and wool, kepenek are also waterproof.

A kepenek can be as much as one centimeter thick, and is sold according to weight. The dry weight of a kepenek is typically around 6kg, however if a kepenek is rained on its weight can increase to 10kg. A kepenek is stiff enough to stand erect without any additional support. While usually worn as garments, they may also function as a makeshift tent, allowing mobile shepherds to sleep in cold environments.

== See also ==
- Burka (overcoat)
