= Sohan Qadri =

Sohan Qadri (born 2 November 1932, in Punjab, India – died 2 March 2011, in Toronto, Canada) was a yogi, poet and a painter from India who lived in Copenhagen for 30 years. During his life, Qadri interacted with a number of well-known cultural figures including Surrealist painter René Magritte, Nobel laureate Heinrich Böll, and architect Le Corbusier. His paintings result from states of deep meditation, and are influenced by the colors of India: luminous, dye-infused works on serrated paper. He had more than 70 exhibitions in the United States, Europe, Asia, and Africa.

== Early life and career in India ==
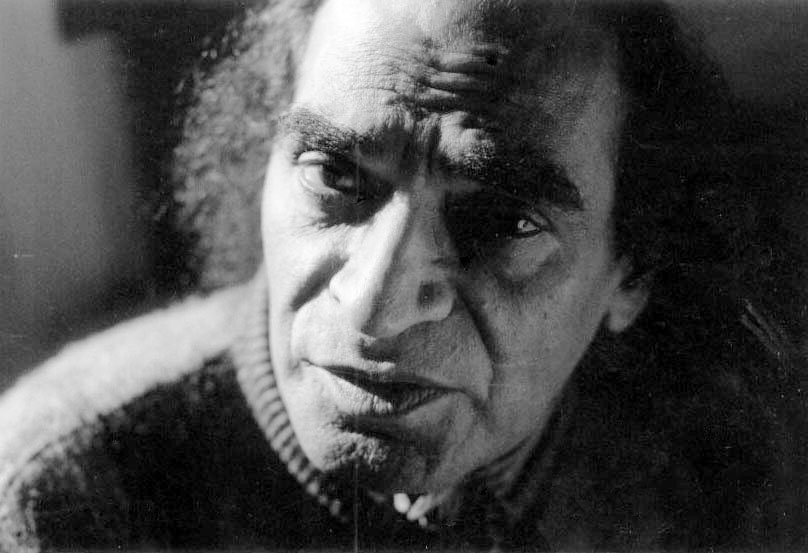
Sohan Qadari

Sohan Qadri was born in the village of Chachoki, in 1932, in British India. Chachoki is near the industrial town of Phagwara in the Kapurthala district of Punjab. He grew up in a wealthy farming family with a Hindu mother and a Sikh father. The village had no electricity, running water, roads or cars.

At the age of seven, Qadri was strongly influenced by two spiritualists. The first was Bikham Giri, a Bengali Tantric-Vajrayan yogi. The second was Ahmed Ali Shah Qadri, a Sufi, who lived near Giri. Both gurus taught him spiritual ideals through meditation, dance and music, and had a profound impact on Qadri, sparking a lifelong interest in spirituality and art, for which Qadri showed talent even as a child. Qadri continued his schooling until the eighth grade, when he matriculated, the first child in the village to do so. He ran away from home several times to avoid taking charge of the family farm as his mother wished. Eventually he refused and went to study a three-year undergraduate degree at Ram Garhia College, pursuing his art as an apprentice to Pyara Kondel, a photographer and amazing artist who taught him the ways of the Kondel art form with a studio in Jullandhar, Punjab.

When Mr.Kondel emigrated to England in 1952, Sohan left Jullandhar for Bombay, settling in Parel and working as a still photographer in an early Bollywood studio in Andheri, Bombay. He resigned after completing two films. In 1955, he enrolled in the Simla College of Art. While a student, Qadri visited the art galleries of Delhi, met the artists Sailoz Mookherjea and J. Swaminathan, who were in the process of starting the group Unknown, and joined the artistic circle around the Indian modernists M.F. Husain, Syed Haider Raza, J. Swaminathan, and Ram Kumar, who were building on earlier Indian modernist movements such as the Calcutta Group (1942) and the Progressive Artists Group of Bombay (1947), while rejecting the reliance on figuration which the earlier artists had believed defined them as authentically Indian.

After finishing his degree, Qadri returned home to Phagwara and joined the faculty of the Phagwara Teachers Training College for three years. In 1961, Dr. Mulk Raj Anand, the founder and editor of the art journal Marg, and associate of the Bloomsbury Group of London, saw Qadri's work at a faculty exhibition, and became his first patron. Anand visited Phagwara in 1963 with Pierre Jeanneret, an architect and cousin of the architect Le Corbusier, who acquired a painting for his collection. Anand and Jeanneret invited Qadri to bring his work to the newly built city of Chandigarh, capital of Punjab and Haryana, designed by Le Corbusier. Qadri's first exhibition was the second exhibition to be held at Gandhi Bhavan, the Punjab University Library art gallery designed by Jeanneret (the first was MF Husain's). During this time Sohan changed his last name from Singh to Qadri as a sign of devotion to his Sufi teacher.

Qadri gained some critical acclaim and began to paint more seriously, teaching himself about the School of Paris by reading the magazines Studio International, Illustrated Weekly of India, and Modern Review. He built himself a studio in Chachoki out of mud and straw bales to continue his art studies, and started creating figurative works, slowly veering toward abstraction, and ultimately abandoning representation in a search for transcendence. "When I start on a canvas," he said, "first I empty my mind of all images. They dissolve into a primordial space. Only emptiness, I feel, should communicate with the emptiness of the canvas." Instead of using subject matter drawn from the gritty urban world like many of his contemporaries, he searched for subject matter that inspired spiritual feelings and turned to an Eastern mode of expression full of bhava or mood. "I was focusing purely on color and form without distraction from figure," he said.

Qadri developed a methodology of painting during this period that he would use for the rest of his life, dividing pure colors into three categories or parts: dark, warm or cool, and light. Dark colors form the earth element or lower level. Warm or cold colors denote energy, each of which possesses a different vibration (vigorous when warm and mild when cold), and form the middle level, and light colors, the upper level. This allowed for a tripartite arrangement that could be organized in descending or ascending order.

In 1962, Qadri had his second exhibition at Sridharani Gallery in New Delhi. After this, with the help of Randhawa and Dr. Anand in Delhi (then chairman of the Lalit Kala Akademi), several galleries took interest in his work. At the time, Indian artists mostly found patrons among the diplomatic or expatriate community, and among the collectors of Qadri's early art were the Belgian Consul and the Canadian and French ambassadors to India.

== Journey to Africa ==
Prompted by Anand, Qadri decided to travel outside of India and devote himself full-time to painting. He had his first international exposure in Africa. Using a fictitious invitation to a wedding in Nairobi, Qadri obtained a passport, and travelled to Mombasa, Kenya, in the luggage hold of a passenger ship. He brought with him all of his large paintings, originally painted in Chachoki for an exhibition at Bombay's Taj Art Gallery, hoping to exhibit them in Kenya. In Mombasa, the port authorities dumped his crate of paintings on the pavement because he could not afford a porter, and he sat with the crate for three days until an acquaintance arrived and agreed to drive them the 300 miles to Nairobi.

Once in Nairobi, he contacted Elimo Njau, a Kenyan cultural figure who visited Delhi often, and had opened two nonprofit galleries, Paa-yaa-paa in Nairobi and Kibo in Marangu, Tanzania. Njau recognized Qadri's work from the Kunika Gallery in Delhi, and offered Qadri an exhibition. Qadri then went to Prem Bhatia, the Indian ambassador to Kenya, with an introductory letter from Anand. Bhatia agreed to sponsor the show and use the embassy's machinery to promote the exhibition. Bhatia bought the first painting for 75 pounds. The successful exhibition was followed by a show at the Stanley Gallery in the American-owned Stanley Hotel.

== Visit to Europe ==
After leaving Africa, Qadri went to Zurich, where he house sat for an architect, Jorge Plangg. Qadri and Plangg formed a bond, and Plangg gave him the keys to an associate's large villa, Tilgenkamp. At Tilgenkamp, Qadri prepared for his first European exhibition, held in November 1966 at the Gallerie Romain Louis in Brussels and arranged with the help of Swiss art critic Mark Kuhn. Of the 23 paintings exhibited, only one was sold.

Shortly afterwards, Kuhn invited Qadri to join him while he interviewed the surrealist painter René Magritte, and Qadri sat quietly while they talked, before playing chess against Magritte.

Before driving with Kuhn from Brussels to Paris to meet Mulk Raj Anand and the Indian painter Syed Haider Raza, Qadri sold five paintings to a couple from Montreal who were on their way back to Canada to open a gallery. Once in Paris, he secured an exhibition in December 1966 at the Gallerie Arnaud alongside European artists including Pierre Soulages, George Michaux, Jean Paul Riepal and Louis Fatoux. Seven years later, he would show his works at Arnaud's sister gallery in Montreal.

When he returned to Zurich, Qadri received an invitation to an international artists' camp in Kushalin, Poland, where he was given lodging, food and painting materials for two months. The Souks Museum of Modern Art in Kushalin acquired one of the paintings he produced during this period. Next to his studio were two Danish artists, painter Bent Kock, and printmaker Helle Thorborg, who were impressed with Qadri's work. In 1969, Thorborg arranged for him to visit Copenhagen, through the Danish cultural ministry.

Before going to Copenhagen, Qadri showed his work in Vienna at the gallery Uni Generation and at the Government Printing Press called d’Orchai. He also showed in Munich at Stenzel Gallerie and stayed for a period in 1968 in Paris where he rented American artist Mimi Vaz's studio in Villa d’Essai. There he mixed with Pierre Soulages and James Michaux, whom he had met at the Arnaud Gallerie, along with the Indian artists Syed Haider Raza, Anjolie Ela Menon, N. Vishwanadhan, and Nikita Narayan. He also met the printmaker Krishna Reddy who was working with his wife, Judy Reddy and the British painter Stanley William Hayter.

During this time, Qadri stopped painting with impasto oil on canvas and experimented with paper, which he considered softer, more feminine, and more suited to works that evolved out of a meditative state.

While in Paris, the Danish Ministry of Culture offered Qadri a show, including traveling expenses and a stipend. The ministry's gallery director bought a painting, as did New Yorker Sam Kanner of Court Gallerie. Christian Oberg, from the graphic department of Denmark's Louisiana Museum, bought several paintings and arranged five exhibitions for Qadri in Denmark.

== Life in Copenhagen ==
In 1973, a few years after settling in Copenhagen, Qadri met another important patron, Nobel laureate Heinrich Böll, to whom he was introduced during a show at the Bodo Galuab Gallery in Cologne, Germany. Böll bought several paintings and wrote about Qadri's work. Böll once said, "Sohan Qadri with his painting liberates the word meditation from its fashionable taste and brings it back to its proper origin." During this period Qadri, along with American psychedelic painter Linda Wood and Pere Bacho, took over an old gun factory and helped found the free city of Christiania, where everything belonged to everyone. Qadri found the city an impossible environment to work in, and six months later returned to Hellerup, where he stayed until Dr. Shimitto's death in 1986. He eventually moved into government-sponsored artists' housing.

Though he continued to produce works on canvas, by the mid-1970s, paper was Qadri's preferred medium. "I was perpetually seeking a medium where effort is superfluous. Deep states of being are not brought out by effort," he said. Qadri said that his work is not philosophical, or designed to excite the thinking process, but instead to arrest the thought process, as in meditation.

Qadri's works are largely monochromatic surfaces which he penetrates with punctures and serrations. The Buddhist scholar Robert Thurman described his dots and striations as "lustrous bubbles of energy." Qadri transformed paper with these markings, making it into a three-dimensional surface.

Throughout the 1980s and 1990s, Qadri was invited to have exhibitions in Los Angeles, Copenhagen, Nairobi, New Delhi, Bombay, Singapore and New York. Although he never married, he had three children with two partners, one a Keralite Christian and the other a Finn. He also began to plan a spiritual earth art project, a gyan stambha or knowledge stupa, on an ancient trading route in the Punjab in India. The structure, intended to occupy several acres of land, would be devoted to knowledge and peace. Construction of the stupa is in progress. As well as continuing with his art, Qadri taught meditation to advanced students throughout Scandinavia.

Sohan Qadri, Tripti VII, 2008. Ink and dye on paper, 55 x 39"

== Selected bibliography ==
- 2011 Sohan Qadri: The Seer, Skira Editore, Milano, Italy. ISBN 978-88-572-0647-9.
- 2009 Wonderstand: The poems "Aphorisms" and "The Dot and the dots", Bindu Publishers, Stockholm, Sweden. ISBN 978-91-977894-0-0.
- 2007 Sohan Qadri: Presence of Being, Sundaram Tagore Ink, New York, USA. ISBN 81-88204-35-8.
- 2005 Seeker: The Art of Sohan Qadri, Mapin Publishing, New York, USA
- 1999 Sakshi, The Seer, Art & Deal, New Delhi, India
- 1995 AntarJoti, Punjabi Sutras, Nav Yug, New Delhi, India
- 1995 Aforismer, Danish translation of English Sutras, Omens Forlang, Denmark
- 1990 Boond Samunder, Punjabi Sutras, Amritsar, New Delhi, India. The Dot & the Dot's, English Sutras, Writers Workshop, Calcutta, India
- 1987 Mitti Mitti, Punjabi sutras, Nava Yug, New Delhi, India
- 1978 The Dot & the Dot's Poems & Paintings, Stockholm, Sweden. ISBN 91-85778-00-1.
