= Gohawar =

- Village
- Location in Punjab, India Gohawar (India)
- Coordinates: 31.1532454°N 75.7877684°E
- Country: India
- State: Punjab
- District: Jalandhar

Government
  - Type: Panchayat raj
  - Body: Gram panchayat
- Elevation: 240 m (790 ft)

Population (2011)
  - Total: 2,645
- Sex ratio 1320/1325 ♂/♀

Languages
  - Official: Punjabi
- Time zone: UTC+5:30 (IST)
- PIN: 144409
- Telephone: 01824
- ISO 3166 code: IN-PB
- Vehicle registration: PB- 08
- Post Office: Goraya
- Website: jalandhar.nic.in

Gohawar is a village in Jalandhar district of Punjab State, India. It is located 6.6 km away from postal head office in Goraya, 20 km from Phillaur, 31.3 km from district headquarter Jalandhar and 134 km from state capital Chandigarh. The village is administrated by a sarpanch who is an elected representative of village as per Panchayati raj (India).

== Education ==
The village has a Punjabi medium, co-ed primary school (GPS Gohawar), which was founded in 1947. The school provides mid-day meals as per Indian Midday Meal Scheme and the meal is prepared on school premises.

== Demography ==
According to the report published by Census India in 2011, Gohawar has a total number of 515 houses and population of 2,645 of which include 1320 males and 1325 females. Literacy rate of Gohawar is 83.19%, higher than state average of 75.84%. The population of children under the age of 6 years is 259 which is 9.79% of total population of Gohawar, and child sex ratio is approximately 947 higher than state average of 897.

Most of the people are from Schedule Caste which constitutes 86.20% of total population in Gohawar. The town does not have any Schedule Tribe population so far.

As per census 2011, 807 people were engaged in work activities out of the total population of Gohawar which includes 702 males and 105 females. According to census survey report 2011, 90.33% workers describe their work as main work and 9.67% workers are involved in marginal activity providing livelihood for less than 6 months.

== Transport ==
Bhatian railway station is the nearest train station. However, Phillaur Junction train station is 19.8 km away from the village. The village is 49.7 km away from domestic airport in Ludhiana and the nearest international airport is located in Chandigarh also Sri Guru Ram Dass Jee International Airport is the second nearest airport which is 134 km away in Amritsar.
