= Burka (surname) =

The surname Burka may refer to:

- Daniel Burka, Canadian creative director for website Digg
- Ellen Burka, Canadian figure skating coach
- Gelete Burka, Ethiopian middle-distance runner
- Jan Burka, Czech painter, graphic artist and sculptor
- Petra Burka, Canadian figure skater
- Sylvia Burka, Canadian speed skater

== See also ==
- Burke (surname) or de Burca
- Berk (disambiguation), a surname
