= Barca, Rimavská Sobota District =

Village and municipality in Slovakia

Barca Baraca
- Municipality
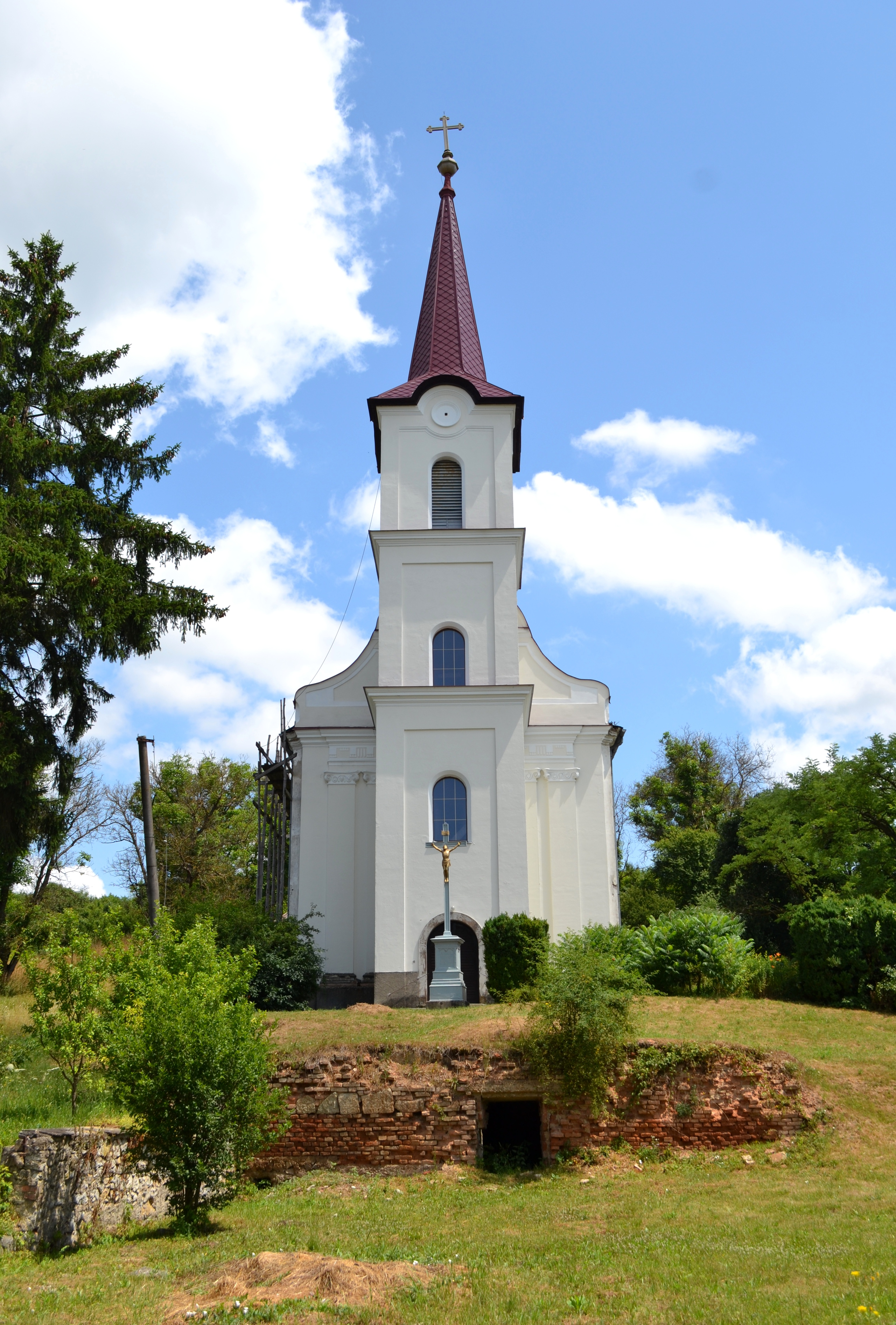

- Flag

- Location of Barca in the Banská Bystrica Region Location of Barca in Slovakia
- Coordinates: 48.3731°N 20.2297°E
- Country: Slovakia
- Region: Banská Bystrica Region
- District: Rimavská Sobota District
- First mentioned: 1334

Area
  - Total: 11.50 km^{2} (4.44 sq mi)
- Elevation: 194 m (636 ft)

Population (2025)
  - Total: 611
- Time zone: UTC+1 (CET)
  - Summer (DST): UTC+2 (CEST)
- Postal code: 982 51
- Area code: +421 47
- Vehicle registration plate (until 2022): RS
- Website: obecbarca.webnode.sk

Barca (earlier also Borica, Baraca; Hungarian: Baraca) is a village and municipality in the Rimavská Sobota District of the Banská Bystrica Region of southern Slovakia.

== History ==
In historical records, the village was first mentioned in 1343 (1343 Barasta, 1345 Barachcha) as a royal donation to the family of the knight Ratold. Historically, the village was the part of the Kingdom of Hungary until 1920. From the 16th century it belonged to the Chapter of Eger, later on to the Jesuits of Košice. From 1938 to 1945 it was part of Hungary again under the First Vienna Award.

== Population ==
Population statistic (10 years)
Year	1995	2005	2015	2025
Count	292	451	566	611
Difference		+54.45%	+25.49%	+7.95%

Population statistic
Year	2024	2025
Count	614	611
Difference		−0.48%

It has a population of 611 people (31 December 2025).

=== Ethnicity ===
Census 2021 (1+ %)
Ethnicity	Number	Fraction
Hungarian	497	83.38%
Romani	358	60.06%
Slovak	66	11.07%
Not found out	23	3.85%
Total	596	

In year 2021 was 596 people by ethnicity 497 as Hungarian, 358 as Romani, 66 as Slovak, 23 as Not found out and 4 as Czech.

Note on population: The difference values of population numbers in the table "Population statistic" and in the sections "Ethnicity" & "Religion" is caused by the use of various statistical methods.

The vast majority of the municipality's population consists of the local Roma community. In 2019, they constituted an estimated 96% of the local population.

=== Religion ===
Census 2021 (1+ %)
Religion	Number	Fraction
Roman Catholic Church	480	80.54%
None	57	9.56%
Jehovah's Witnesses	44	7.38%
Not found out	10	1.68%
Total	596	

In year 2021 was 596 people by religion 480 from Roman Catholic Church, 57 from None, 44 from Jehovah's Witnesses, 10 from Not found out, 3 from Calvinist Church, 1 from Other and 1 from Greek Catholic Church.

== Genealogical resources ==
The records for genealogical research are available at the state archive in Banská Bystrica (Slovak: Štátny archív v Banskej Bystrici).

- Roman Catholic church records (births/marriages/deaths): 1789-1896 (parish A)
- Lutheran church records (births/marriages/deaths): 1730-1896 (parish B)
- Reformated church records (births/marriages/deaths): 1707-1871 (parish B)

== See also ==
- List of municipalities and towns in Slovakia
