= Franko Luin =

Swedish type designer (1941–2005)

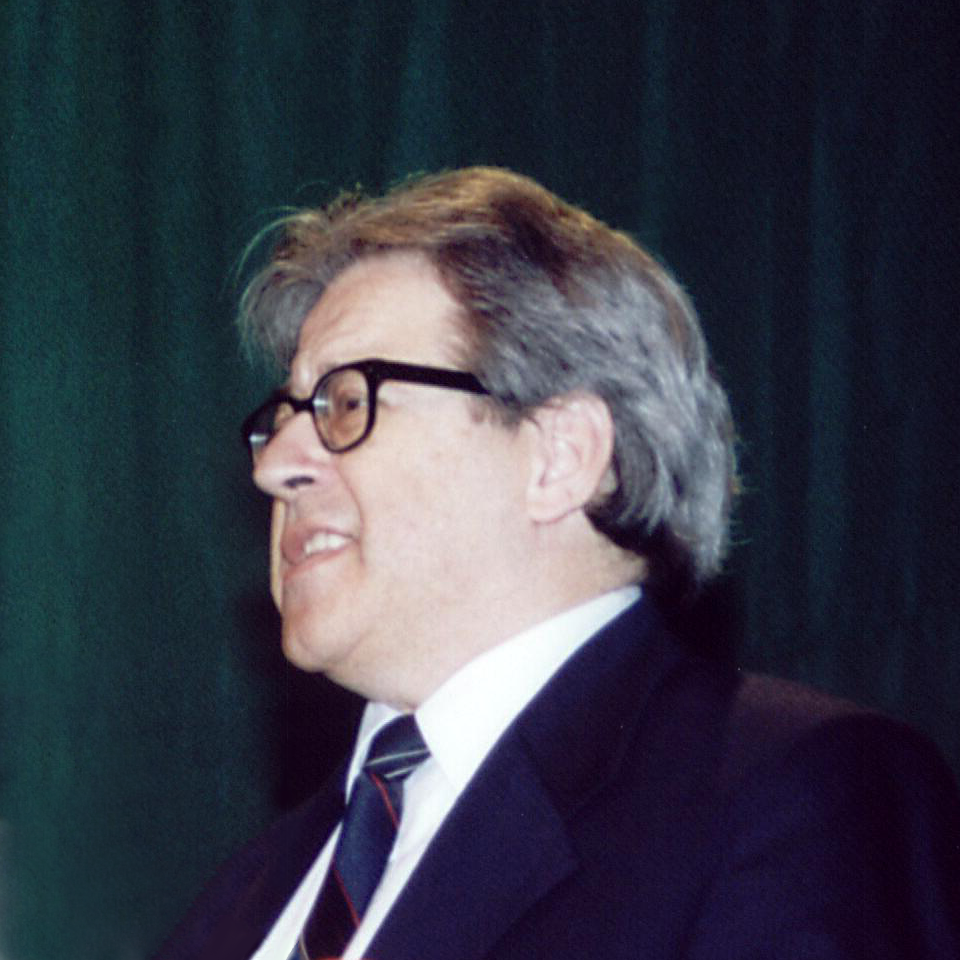
- Franko Luin
- Born: 6 April 1941; Trieste, Italy
- Died: 15 September 2005 (aged 64); Tyresö, Sweden
- Occupation: Swedish type designer

Franko Luin (6 April 1941 in Trieste, Italy – 15 September 2005 in Tyresö, Sweden) was a Swedish type designer of Slovene origin. He studied graphic arts at Grafiska Institutet in Stockholm, where he graduated in 1967. A graphic designer at the telecom company Ericsson (1967–1989), He started his own design shop Omnibus Typografi in 1989.

Franko Luin had a keen interest in languages, particularly the international auxiliary language Esperanto, and was for many years president of the Swedish Esperanto association SEF. He wrote poems, translated songs into Esperanto and organized a well renowned homepage, the Kiosk, which had an enormous link list of online newspapers. In his later years, he collected and digitized many 19th and 20th century works by Slovene classical authors and distributed them on his homepage Beseda ("Word").

== Typefaces of his design ==
- Ad Hoc
- Baskerville Classico
- Birka
- Bodoni Classico
- Carniola
- Caslon Classico
- Cirkus
- Devin
- Dialog
- Edinost
- Emona
- Esperanto
- Fortuna
- Garamond Classico
- Goudy Modern 94
- Goudy Village
- Griffo Classico
- Humana
- Inko
- Isolde
- Jenson Classico
- Jesper
- Jonatan
- Kalix
- Kasper
- Kis Classico
- Luma
- Manuskript
- Marco Polo
- Maskot
- Memento
- Miramar
- Norma
- Nyfors
- Odense
- Odense Neon
- Omnibus
- Pax
- Pax #2
- Persona
- Ragnar
- Res Publica
- Rustika
- Saga
- Semper
- Stockholm Runt
- Transport
- Valdemar
- Vega antikva
- Zip 2000
