= Nizhny Kurchali =

Village in Vedensky District, Russia

Coordinates: 43°01′40″N 46°10′02″E

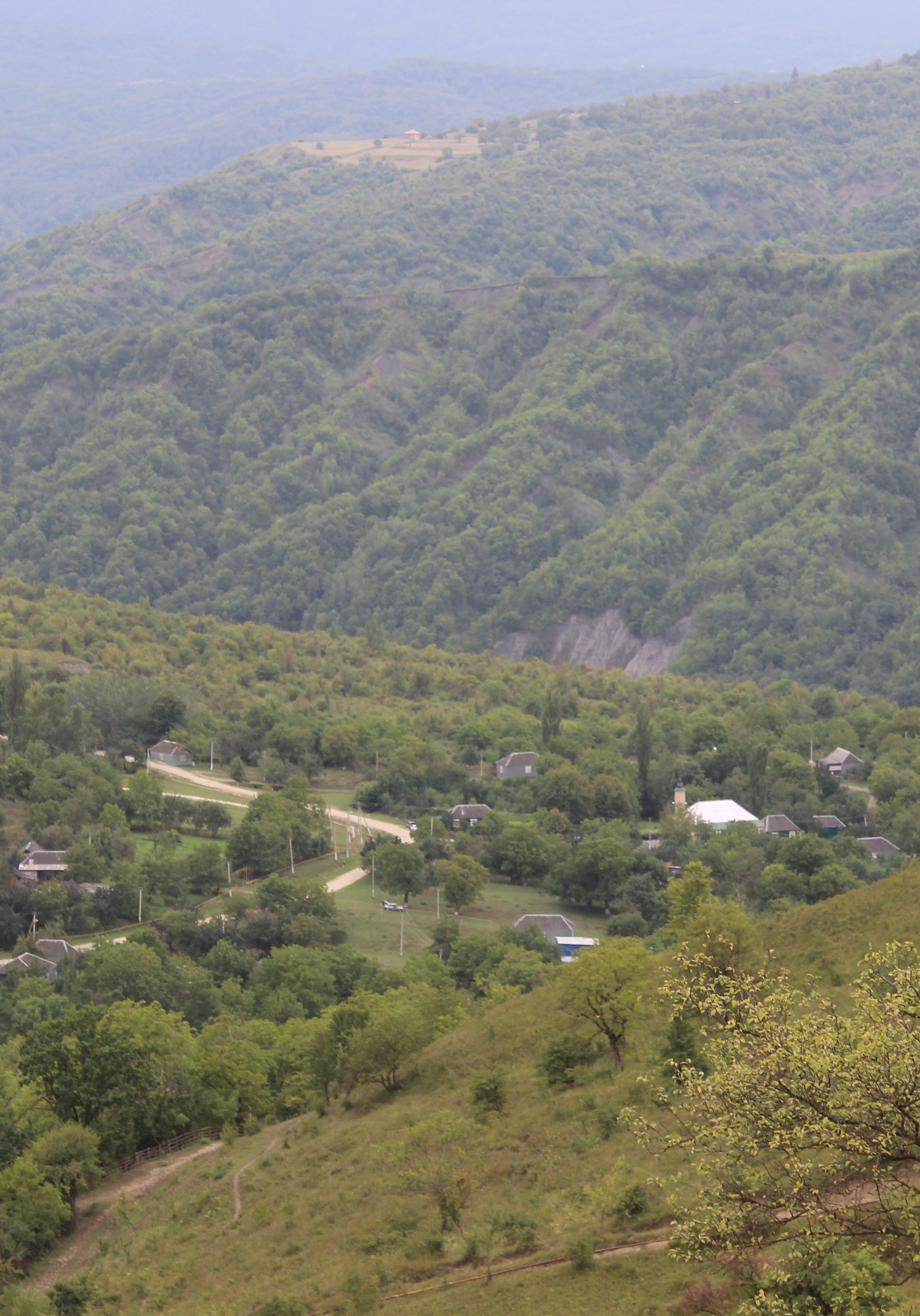
Nizhny Kurchali

Nizhny Kurchali (Russian: Нижние Курчали, Chechen: Лаха-Курчалa, Laxa-Kurçala) is a rural locality (a selo) in Vedensky District, Chechnya.

== Administrative and municipal status ==
Municipally, Nizhny Kurchali is incorporated into Kurchalinskoye rural settlement. It is the de facto administrative center of the municipality and one of the six settlements included in it.

== Geography ==
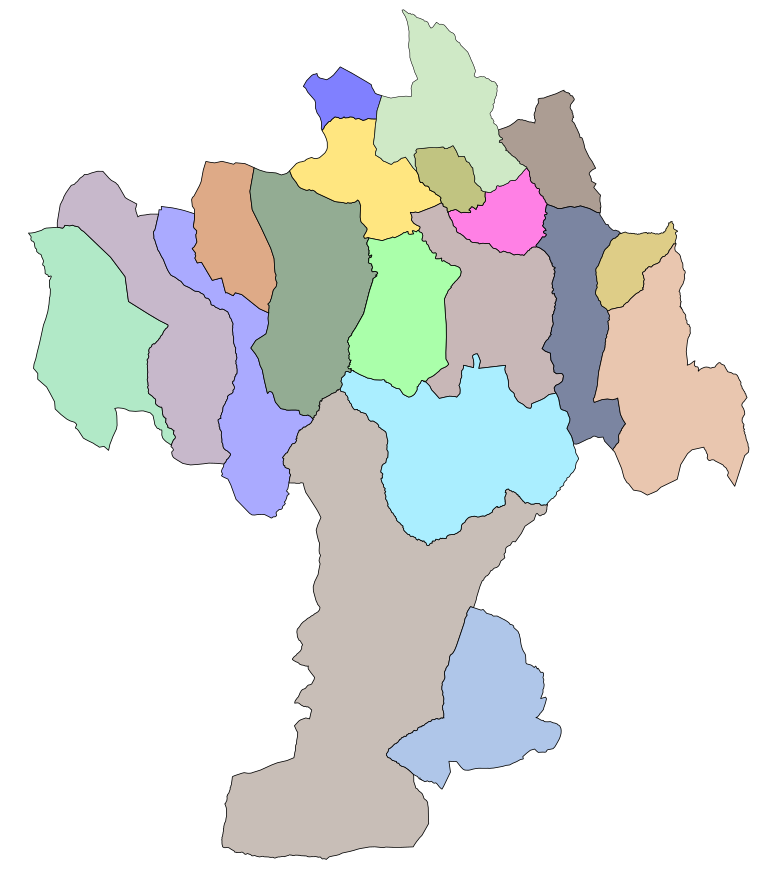
Map of Vedensky District. Nizhny Kurchali is in the north-east

Nizhny Kurchali is located on the right bank of the Gums River. It is 40 kilometres (25 mi) north-east of the village of Vedeno.

The nearest settlements to Nizhny Kurchali are Shirdi-Mokhk in the north, Bas-Gordali in the north-east, Sredny Kurchali and Tazen-Kala in the south-east, Ersenoy and Mesedoy in the south-west, and Guni in the north-west.

== History ==
In 1944, after the genocide and deportation of the Chechen and Ingush people and the Chechen-Ingush ASSR was abolished, the village of Nizhny Kurchali was renamed to Ishtiburi, and settled by people from the neighboring republic of Dagestan. From 1944 to 1957, it was a part of the Vedensky District of the Dagestan ASSR.

In 1958, after the Vaynakh people returned and the Chechen-Ingush ASSR was restored, the village regained its old name, Nizhny Kurchali.

== Population ==
- 1990 Census: 215
- 2002 Census: 0
- 2010 Census: 130
- 2019 estimate: ?

At the time of the 2002 Census, Nizhny Kurchali had been abandoned as a result of the Chechen Wars. However, by the 2010 Census, some of the former residents of the village had returned.

According to the results of the 2010 Census, the majority of residents of Nizhny Kurchali were ethnic Chechens.
