= Chachrari =

- Village
- Location in Punjab, India Chachrari (India)
- Coordinates: 31.1620317°N 75.7732951°E
- Country: India
- State: Punjab
- District: Jalandhar
- Tehsil: Phillaur

Government
  - Type: Panchayat raj
  - Body: Gram panchayat
- Elevation: 246 m (807 ft)

Population (2011)
  - Total: 1,545
- Sex ratio 780/765 ♂/♀

Languages
  - Official: Punjabi
- Time zone: UTC+5:30 (IST)
- PIN: 144409
- Telephone code: 01826
- ISO 3166 code: IN-PB
- Vehicle registration: PB 37
- Post office: Goraya
- Website: jalandhar.nic.in

Chachrari is a village in Jalandhar district of Punjab State, India. It is located 7 km away from Phagwara, 18 km from Phillaur, 29 km from district headquarter Jalandhar and 127 km from state capital Chandigarh. The village is administrated by a sarpanch who is an elected representative of village as per Panchayati raj (India).

== Demography ==
As of 2011, Chachrari has a total number of 329 houses and population of 1,545 of which 780 are males while 765 are females according to the report published by Census India in 2011. Literacy rate of Chachrari is 84.18%, higher than state average of 82.37%. The population of children under the age of 6 years is 155 which is 10.03% of total population of Chachrari, and child sex ratio is approximately 824 lower than state average of 846.

Most of the people are from Schedule Caste which constitutes 46.02% of total population in Begampur. The town does not have any Schedule Tribe population so far.

As per census 2011, 527 people were engaged in work activities out of the total population of Chachrari which includes 445 males and 82 females. According to census survey report 2011, 95.26% workers describe their work as main work and 4.74% workers are involved in marginal activity providing livelihood for less than 6 months.

== Transport ==
=== Rail ===
Phagwara Junction is the nearest train station however, Mauli Railway Station is only 1.5 km (walking distance) away from the village.

=== Air ===
The nearest domestic airport is located 48 km away in Ludhiana and the nearest international airport is located in Chandigarh also Sri Guru Ram Dass Jee International Airport is the second nearest airport which is 123 km away in Amritsar.
