= Chachoki =

- Village
- Location in Punjab, India Chachoki (India)
- Coordinates: 31.194708°N 75.770579°E
- Country: India
- State: Punjab
- District: Kapurthala

Government
  - Type: Panchayati raj (India)
  - Body: Gram panchayat

Population (2011)
  - Total: 4,307
- Sex ratio 2310/1997♂/♀

Languages
  - Official: Punjabi
  - Other spoken: Hindi
- Time zone: UTC+5:30 (IST)
- PIN: 144632
- Telephone code: 01822
- ISO 3166 code: IN-PB
- Vehicle registration: PB-09
- Website: kapurthala.gov.in

Chachoki is a village in Phagwara Tehsil in Kapurthala district of Punjab State, India. It is located 51 kilometres (32 mi) from Kapurthala, 3 kilometres (1.9 mi) from Phagwara, and 128 kilometres (80 mi) from State capital Chandigarh. The village is administrated by a Sarpanch, who is an elected representative.

== Demography ==
According to the report published by Census India in 2011, Chachoki has 958 houses with the total population of 4,307 persons of which 2,310 are male and 1,997 females. The population of children in the age group 0–6 years is 501.

The table below shows the population of different religious groups in Chachoki village, as of 2011 census.

Population by religious groups in Chachoki village, 2011 census
Religion	Total	Female	Male
Hindu	3,259	1,481	1,778
Sikh	893	444	449
Muslim	74	29	45
Buddhist	23	10	13
Jain	2	2	0
Christian	1	0	1
Not stated	55	31	24
Total	4,307	1,997	2,310

== Population data ==
Particulars	Total	Male	Female
Total No. of Houses	958	-	-
Population	4,307	2,310	1,997
Child (0-6)	501	259	242
Schedule Caste	1,323	699	624
Schedule Tribe	0	0	0
Literacy	3,287	1,867	1,420
Total Workers	1,585	1,328	257
Main Worker	1,501	1,278	223
Marginal Worker	84	50	34

== Transport ==
Phagwara Junction Railway Station and Mauli Halt Railway Station are the closest railway stations to Chachoki; however, Jalandhar City Rail Way station is 24 km away from the village. The village is 119 km away from Sri Guru Ram Dass Jee International Airport in Amritsar and the other nearest airport is Sahnewal Airport in Ludhiana, which is located 38 km away from the village.

== See also ==
- Sohan Qadri
