= Johann Becker (entomologist) =

Brazilian entomologist (1932–2004)

Johann Becker (1932–2004) was a Brazilian entomologist who made important contributions to the study of insects in Brazil. He worked at the National Museum of Brazil. The assassin bug Ghilianella beckeri was named after him.
