= Burca =

Burca may refer to:

- Burca, a 5th century episcopal see in Numidia (Roman province), North Africa
- Burca (butterfly)
- Burca, a village in the commune Vidra, Vrancea, Romania

== See also ==
- Burqa, article of clothing fully covering the female body.
