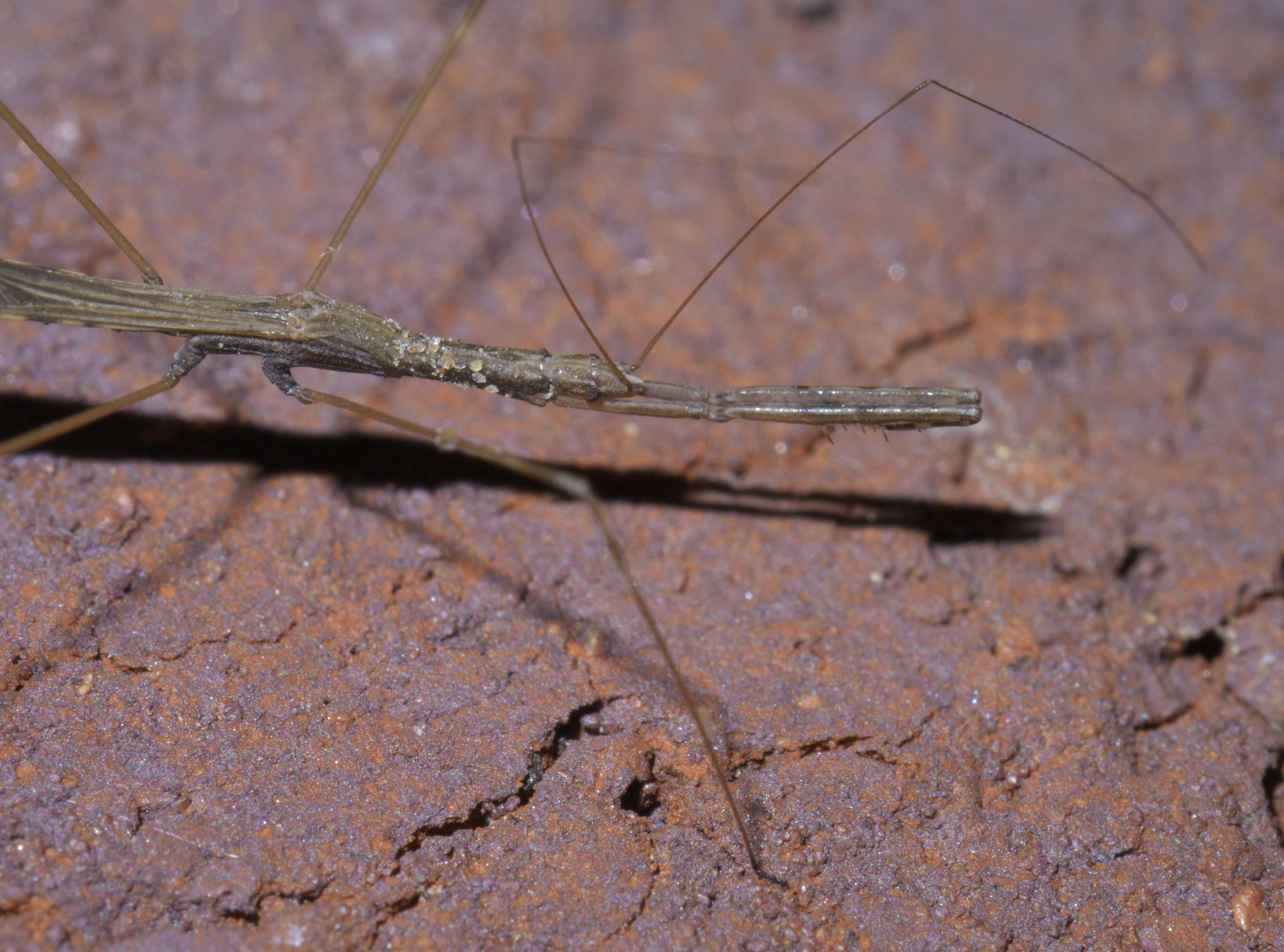

Scientific classification
- Kingdom: Animalia
- Phylum: Arthropoda
- Clade: Pancrustacea
- Class: Insecta
- Order: Hemiptera
- Suborder: Heteroptera
- Family: Reduviidae
- Tribe: Metapterini
- Genus: Barce; Stål, 1866

= Barce (bug) =

Genus of true bugs

Barce is a genus of thread-legged bugs in the family Reduviidae. There are about six described species in Barce.

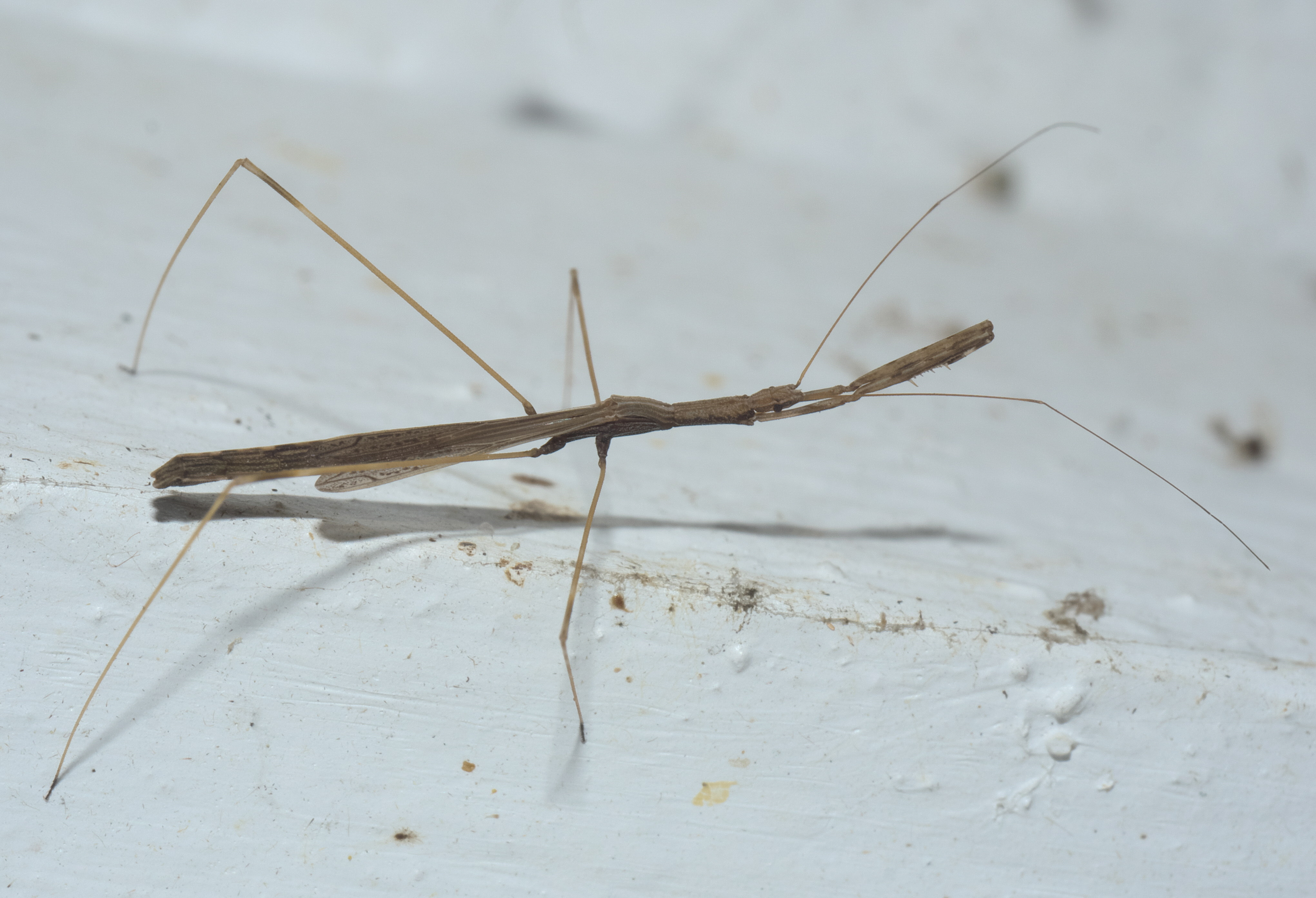

== Species ==
These six species belong to the genus Barce:

- Barce aberrans (McAtee and Malloch, 1925)^{i c g}
- Barce fraterna (Say, 1832)^{i c g b}
- Barce husseyi Wygodzinsky, 1966^{i c g}
- Barce neglecta (McAtee and Malloch, 1925)^{i c g}
- Barce uhleri Banks, 1909^{i c g b}
- Barce werneri Wygodzinsky, 1966^{i c g}

Data sources: i = ITIS, c = Catalogue of Life, g = GBIF, b = Bugguide.net
