= Mesedoy =

Rural locality in Vedensky District, Chechnya

Coordinates: 43°01′14″N 46°07′19″E

Mesedoy (Russian: Меседой, Chechen: Месдой-КӀотар) is a rural locality (a selo) in Vedensky District, Chechnya.

== Administrative and municipal status ==
Municipally, Mesedoy is incorporated into Guninskoye rural settlement. It is one of the four settlements included in it.

== Geography ==
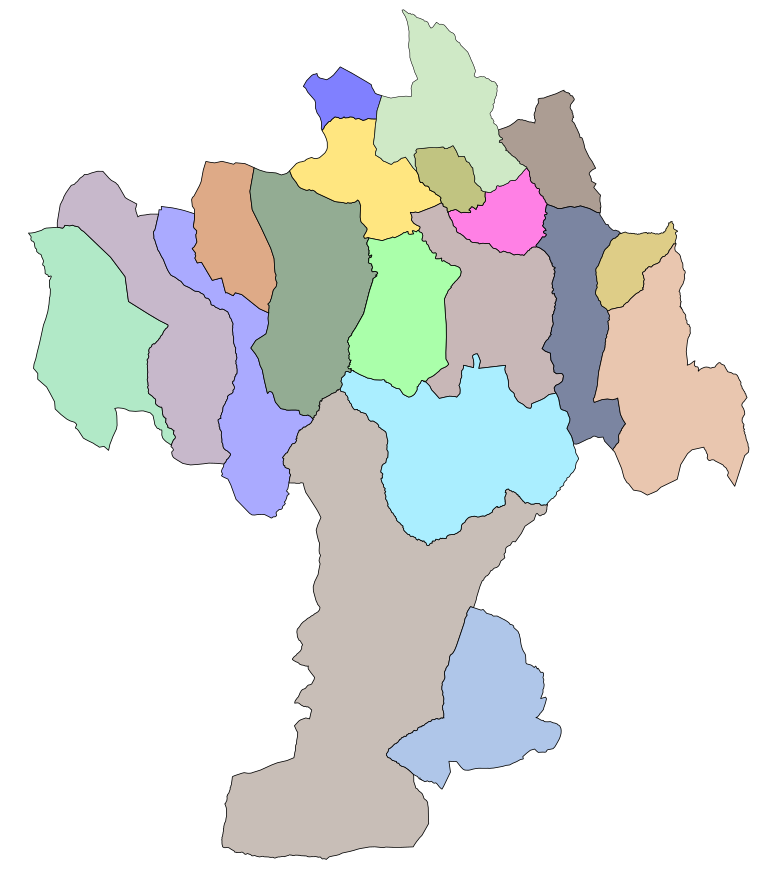
Map of Vedensky District. Mesedoy is in the Guni rural settlement

Mesedoy is located in the upper reaches of one of the left tributaries of the Gums River. It is 16 kilometres (9.9 mi) north-east of Vedeno.

The nearest settlements to Mesedoy are Guni in the north-west, Nizhny Kurchali and Shirdi-Mokhk in the north-east, Ersenoy in the south-east, and Agishbatoy in the south-west.

== History ==
In 1944, after the genocide and deportation of the Chechen and Ingush people and the Chechen-Ingush ASSR was abolished, the village of Mesedoy was renamed, and settled by people from the neighboring republic of Dagestan. From 1944 to 1957, it was a part of the Vedensky District of the Dagestan ASSR.

In 1958, after the Vaynakh people returned and the Chechen-Ingush ASSR was restored, the village regained its old Chechen name, Mesada.

== Population ==
- 1990 Census: 110
- 2002 Census: 144
- 2010 Census: 227

According to the results of the 2010 Census, the majority of residents of Mesedoy were ethnic Chechens.

== Infrastructure ==
The village of Mesedoy hosts one primary school.
