= Metapterini =

Scientific classification
- Kingdom: Animalia
- Phylum: Arthropoda
- Clade: Pancrustacea
- Class: Insecta
- Order: Hemiptera
- Suborder: Heteroptera
- Family: Reduviidae
- Subfamily: Emesinae
- Tribe: Metapterini; Stål, 1874

Tribe of true bugs

The Metapterini are a tribe of thread-legged bugs, assassin bugs of subfamily Emesinae.

== Selected genera ==
Genera of Metapterini include:

- Anandromesa
- Barce
- Bargylia Stål, 1866
- Berlandiana
- Bobba Bergroth, 1914
- Emesaya
- Emesella
- Ghilianella
- Ghinallelia
- Hornylia
- Ischnobaena
- Ischnobaenella
- Ischnonyctes
- Jamesa
- Jamesella
- Leaylia
- Leptinoschidium
- Liaghinella
- Metapterus
- Nandariva
- Onychomesa
- Pelmatomesa
- Pseudobargylia
- Pseudometapterus
- Schidium
- Taitaia
- Tubuataita
