= Barqa, Gaza =

Barqa برقة Burqa
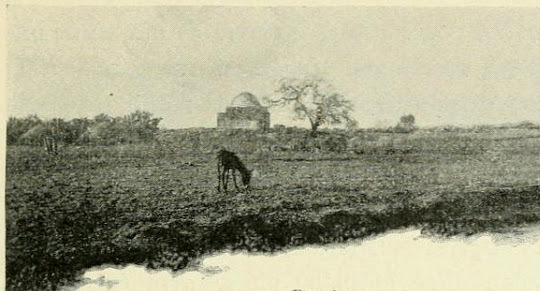
- Maqam (shrine) of Neby Burk, in 1898
- Etymology: sandy ground covered with flint
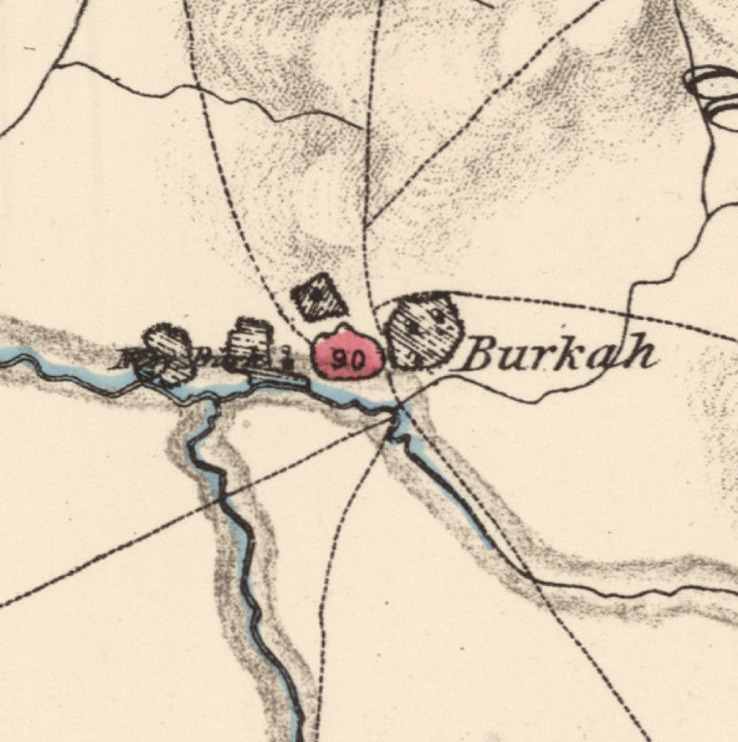
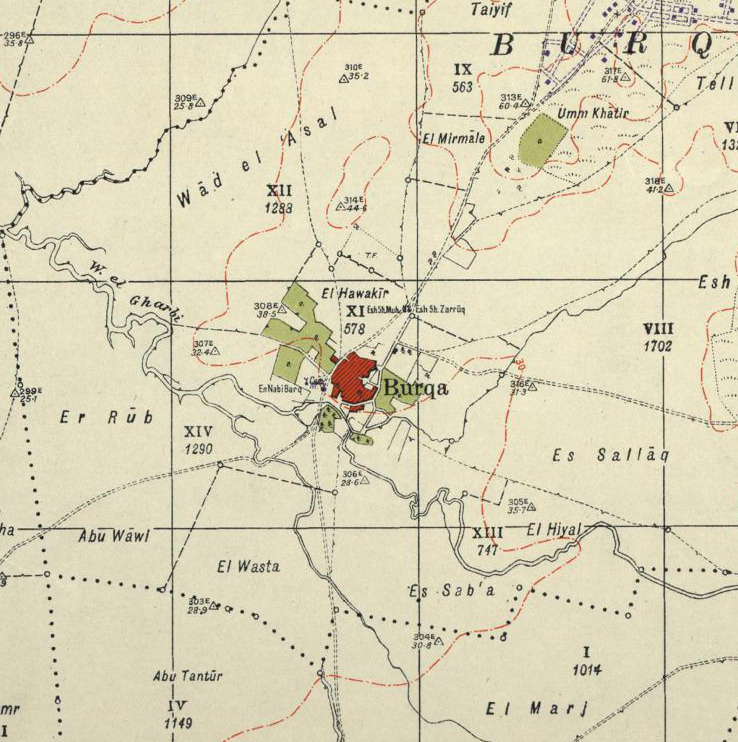
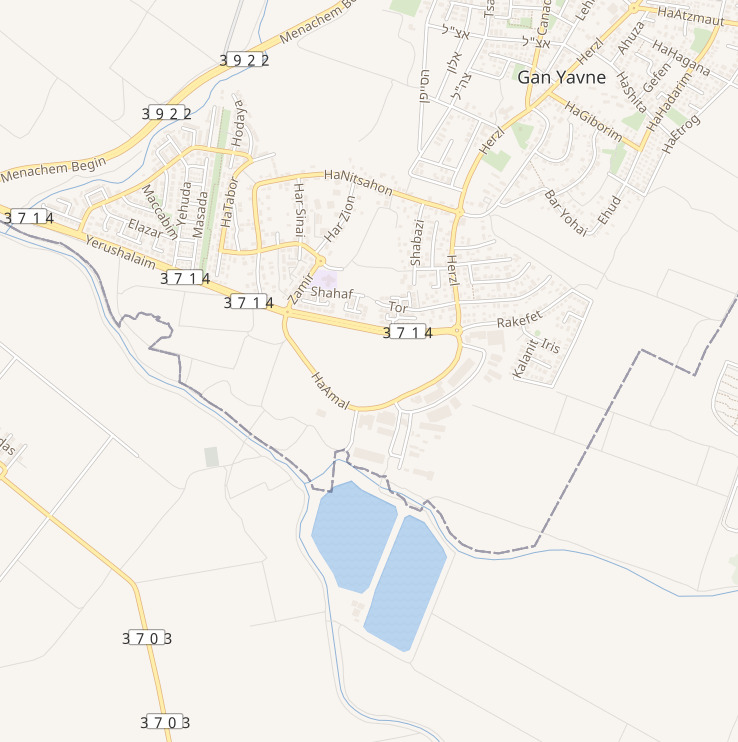
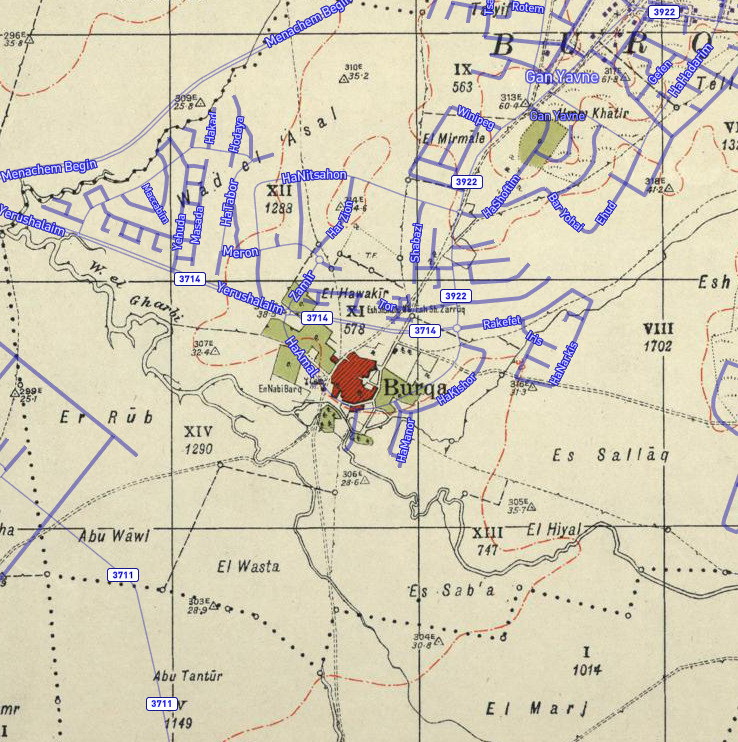
- 1870s map 1940s map modern map 1940s with modern overlay map A series of historical maps of the area around Barqa, Gaza (click the buttons)

- Location within Mandatory Palestine
- Coordinates: 31°46′35″N 34°42′5″E
- Palestine grid: 121/131
- Geopolitical entity: Mandatory Palestine
- Subdistrict: Gaza
- Date of depopulation: May 13, 1948

Area
  - Total: 5,206 dunams (5.206 km^{2}; 2.010 sq mi)

Population (1945)
  - Total: 890
- Cause(s) of depopulation: Military assault by Yishuv forces
- Current Localities: Gan Yavne

Barqa (Arabic: برقة) was a Palestinian Arab village located 37 km north of Gaza near the modern-day Israeli city of Ashdod. It was referred to as Barka by the Greeks and Bareca by the Romans during their rule over the ancient Philistine city. In 1945, the village had a population of 890 and total land area of 5,206 dunums.

It was occupied and depopulated on May 13, 1948 during Operation Barak, a Yishuv offensive in southern Palestine just prior to the outbreak of the 1948 Arab-Israeli War. The ruins of the village were later incorporated into the Israeli town of Gan Yavne.

== History ==
It is likely that Barqa was built on the site of the Greek town of Barka, which the Romans called Baraca. The villagers were Muslim, and around the village mosque were a number of tombs that they referred to as the tombs of Shaykh Muhammad, Shaykh Zarruq, and the prophet (al-nabi) Barq.

A burial chamber with four arcosolia have been uncovered at Barqa. It contained three pottery lamps, dated to the late Roman or Byzantine Empire era, and two Byzantine glass vessels, dated to fifth century CE. The village was a major centre in the Byzantine era. In 511 CE a richly decorated basilica church was built, with a mosaic floor. It was in use until the seventh century.

=== Ottoman era ===
Barqa, like the rest of Palestine, was incorporated into the Ottoman Empire in 1517, and in the census of 1596, the village was located in the nahiya of Gazza in the liwa of Gazza. It had a population of 12 households, all Muslim. They paid a fixed tax-rate of 25% on agricultural products, including wheat, barley, summer crops, fruit trees and sesame; the taxes totalled 2,100 akçe.

In 1838, Robinson noted Burka as a Muslim village located in the Gaza district.

In 1863 Victor Guérin visited and noted, lying beside a well, several trunks of greyish marble. A kubbeh was here, dedicated to Neby Barak, and surrounded by tombs. An Ottoman village list from about 1870 showed that Burka had a population of 202, with a total of 80 houses, though the population count included men, only.

In 1882 the PEF's Survey of Western Palestine described Barqa as an "ordinary" village, with the tomb of Neby Burk.

=== British Mandate of Palestine ===
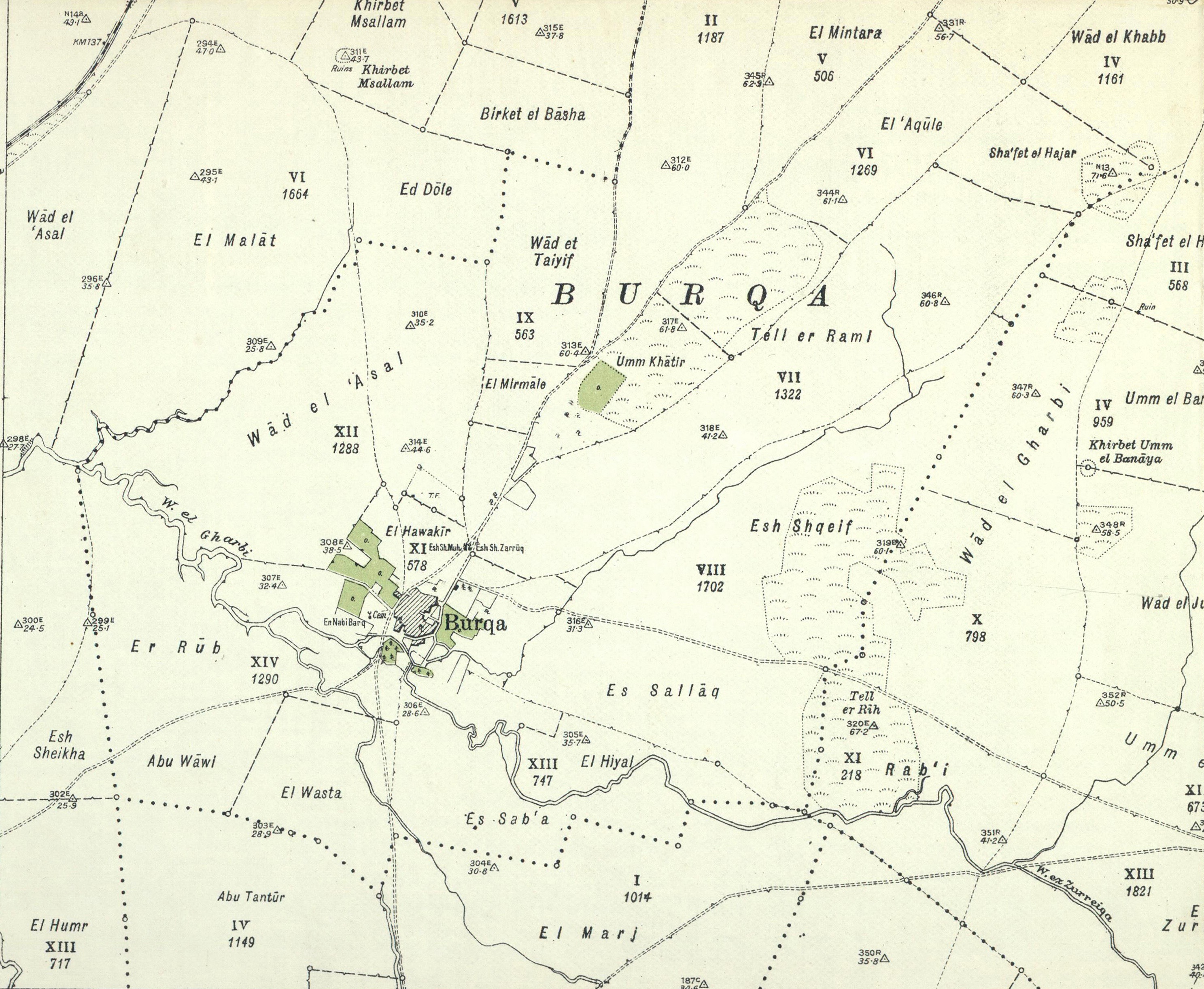
Barqa, Gaza District, 1930

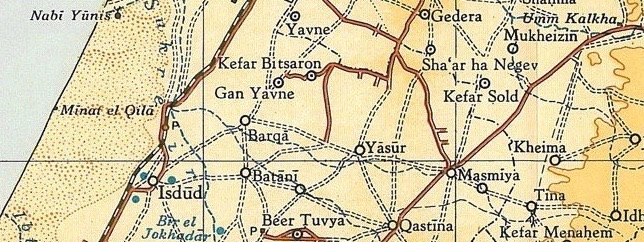
Barqa, Gaza District,1945

In the 1922 census of Palestine conducted by the British Mandate authorities, Burqa had a population of 448 inhabitants, all Muslims, which had increased in the 1931 census to 600, 593 Muslim, 6 Jews and 1 Christian, in a total of in 123 houses.

In the 1945 statistics the population of Barqa consisted of 890, all Muslims, and the land area was 5,206 dunams, according to an official land and population survey. Of this, 667 dunams were designated for citrus and bananas, 47 for plantations and irrigable land, 4,031 for cereals, while 26 dunams were built-up areas.

=== 1948 and aftermath ===
Barqa became depopulated on May 13, 1948, after a military assault by the Yishuv's Giv'ati forces. The area was subsequently incorporated into the State of Israel. In 1992, the village remaining structures on the village land were described:

"Two houses remain standing on the site. One serves as a warehouse; it is made of concrete and has a covered portico on two sides. The other, a stone house with rectangular doors and windows and a flat roof, stands deserted in the midst of wild vegetation. The site is overgrown with weeds interspersed with cactuses and eucalyptus and palm trees. Israelis cultivate the land around the site."

== Bibliography ==
- Barron, J. B., ed. (1923). Palestine: Report and General Abstracts of the Census of 1922. Government of Palestine.
- Ben-Ari, Chen (2012-02-14). "Barqa, Gan Yavne" (124). Hadashot Arkheologiyot – Excavations and Surveys in Israel.
- Conder, C.R.; Kitchener, H. H. (1882). The Survey of Western Palestine: Memoirs of the Topography, Orography, Hydrography, and Archaeology. Vol. 2. London: Committee of the Palestine Exploration Fund.
- Dauphin, C. (1998). La Palestine byzantine, Peuplement et Populations. BAR International Series 726 (in French). Vol. III : Catalogue. Oxford: Archeopress. ISBN 0-860549-05-4. p. 862
- Department of Statistics (1945). Village Statistics, April, 1945. Government of Palestine.
- Gautier, L. (1898). Souvenirs de Terre-Sainte (in French) (2 ed.). Lausanne: Georges Bridel.
- Gonen, Ilana (2014-06-23). "Barqa (South)" (126). Hadashot Arkheologiyot – Excavations and Surveys in Israel.
- Guérin, V. (1869). Description Géographique Historique et Archéologique de la Palestine (in French). Vol. 1: Judee, pt. 2. Paris: L'Imprimerie Nationale.
- Hadawi, S. (1970). Village Statistics of 1945: A Classification of Land and Area ownership in Palestine. Palestine Liberation Organization Research Centre.
- Hartmann, M. (1883). "Die Ortschaftenliste des Liwa Jerusalem in dem türkischen Staatskalender für Syrien auf das Jahr 1288 der Flucht (1871)". Zeitschrift des Deutschen Palästina-Vereins. 6: 102–149.
- Hütteroth, W.-D.; Abdulfattah, K. (1977). Historical Geography of Palestine, Transjordan and Southern Syria in the Late 16th Century. Erlanger Geographische Arbeiten, Sonderband 5. Erlangen, Germany: Vorstand der Fränkischen Geographischen Gesellschaft. ISBN 3-920405-41-2.
- Khalidi, W. (1992). All That Remains: The Palestinian Villages Occupied and Depopulated by Israel in 1948. Washington D.C.: Institute for Palestine Studies. ISBN 0-88728-224-5.
- Mills, E., ed. (1932). Census of Palestine 1931. Population of Villages, Towns and Administrative Areas. Jerusalem: Government of Palestine.
- Morris, B. (2004). The Birth of the Palestinian Refugee Problem Revisited. Cambridge University Press. ISBN 978-0-521-00967-6.
- Palmer, E. H. (1881). The Survey of Western Palestine: Arabic and English Name Lists Collected During the Survey by Lieutenants Conder and Kitchener, R. E. Transliterated and Explained by E.H. Palmer. Committee of the Palestine Exploration Fund.
- Sion, Ofer; Rapuano, Yehudah; Di Segni, Leah (2010-09-05). "Barqa" (122). Hadashot Arkheologiyot – Excavations and Surveys in Israel.
- Robinson, E.; Smith, E. (1841). Biblical Researches in Palestine, Mount Sinai and Arabia Petraea: A Journal of Travels in the year 1838. Vol. 3. Boston: Crocker & Brewster.
- Socin, A. (1879). "Alphabetisches Verzeichniss von Ortschaften des Paschalik Jerusalem". Zeitschrift des Deutschen Palästina-Vereins. 2: 135–163.
- Torge, Hagit (2006-07-02). "Barqa (North)" (118). Hadashot Arkheologiyot – Excavations and Surveys in Israel.
- Torge, Hagit (2006-08-03). "Barqa (East)" (118). Hadashot Arkheologiyot – Excavations and Surveys in Israel.
- Volynsky, Felix (2010-01-03). "Barqa (North)" (122). Hadashot Arkheologiyot – Excavations and Surveys in Israel.
