= Burka (overcoat) =

Type of rough overcoat

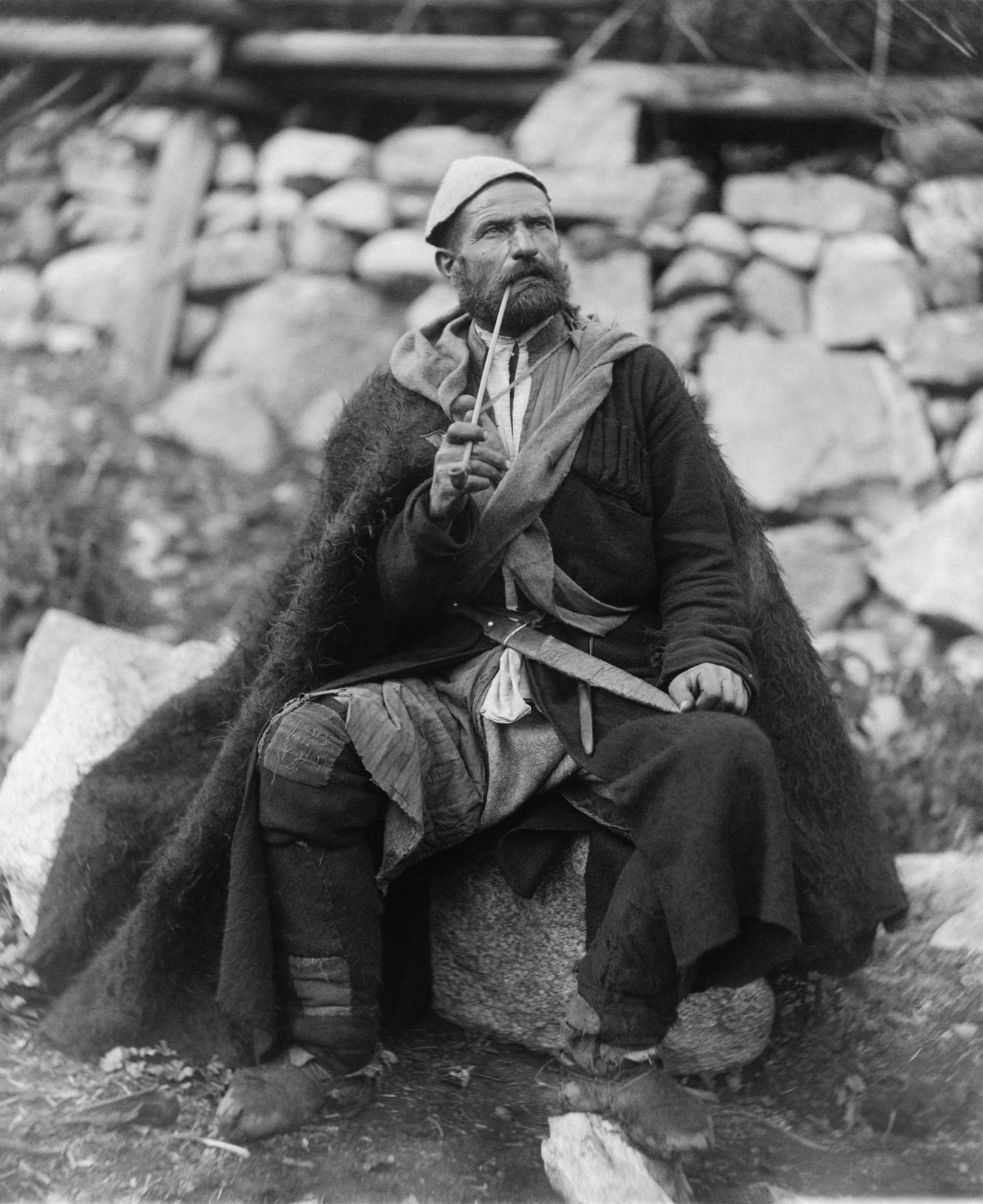
Svan man with burka and kinjal

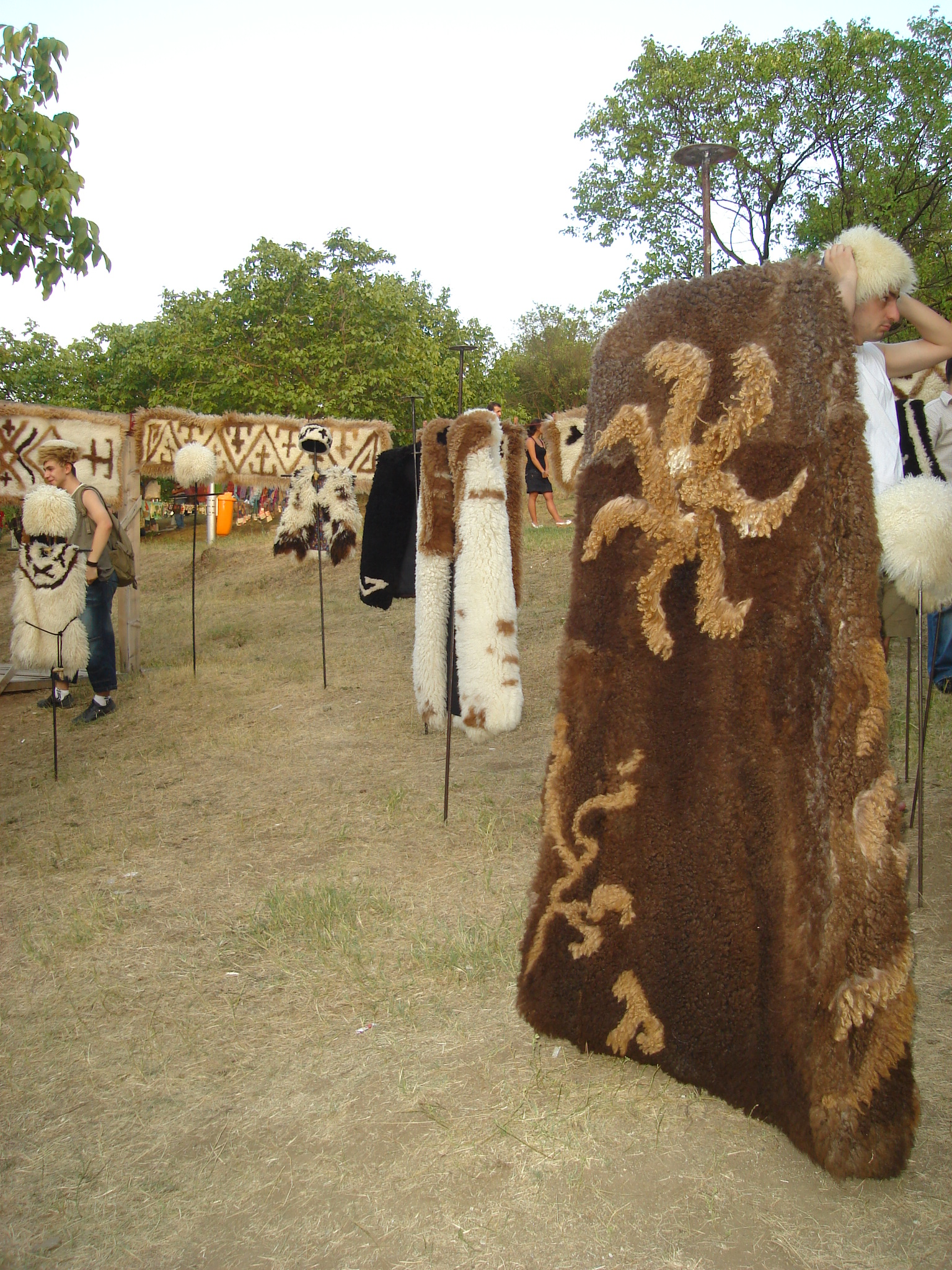
Georgian burka (nabadi) and papakhi displayed at a folk festival in 2008

A burka (Abkhaz: ауапа awápa, Adyghe: кӏакӏо chakwe, Armenian: այծենակաճ aytsenakach, Avar: буртина burtína, Azerbaijani: yapıncı, Chechen: верта verta, Georgian: ნაბადი nabadi, Ingush: ферта ferta, Kabardian: щӏакӏуэ shakwe, Iron Ossetic: нымæт nymæt Russian: бурка burka, Svan: ღა̈რთ ghært) is an overcoat made from felt or karakul (the short curly fur of young lambs of the breed of that name).

Karakul being quite expensive, burkas were usually sewn from felt treated to look like karakul. Burkas are sewn with high, squared off shoulders, and wearers will have a distinctive high-shouldered silhouette. Chechnya was the main producer of burkas throughout the North Caucasus.

Burkas were part of the customary male garb of various peoples inhabiting the Caucasus region. Burkas were adopted by Russian cavalry, and worn as part of the Russian military uniform from the middle of the 18th century until the 1850s, during the Caucasus War. Vasily Chapayev was portrayed wearing a burka as a part of his military uniform in a 1934 Soviet film.

Other items of traditional Caucasian dress were the beshmet, a soft inner shirt with a close-fitting collar, and the cherkeska, a collarless outer shirt with a V-shaped opening in the front with long, wide sleeves. Across the cherkeska were the gazerei, a row of semi-ornamental cartridge-cases, sometimes with decorated tops. On the belt was the kinzhal, a long dagger worn diagonally in front. Below were narrow trousers tied below the knee and at the ankle, leggings, and leather boots. Over all this was the large wool burka, fastened at the neck and open at the front. It could be reversed to make a windbreak or used as a blanket. On the head was the bashlyk, a soft cap, or the papakha, a large wool hat.

== See also ==
- Kepenek, a similar garment in Turkey
