= Chozhi-Chu =

Rural locality in Chechnya

Coordinates: 43°05′10″N 45°17′19″E

Chozhi-Chu (Russian: Чожи-Чу, Chechen: ЧӀожи-Чу) was a rural locality (a selo) in Achkhoy-Martanovsky District, Chechnya.

== Geography ==
Map of Chechnya with Achkhoy-Martanovsky District highlighted

Chozhi-Chu was located at the confluence of the Chozh River into the Nitkhi River. It was located to the south of the district center, Achkhoy-Martan.

The nearest settlements to Chozhi-Chu were Bamut in the north-west, Stary Achkhoy in the north, Yandi in the north-east, and Shalazhi in the east.

== History ==
In 1944, after the genocide and deportation of the Chechen and Ingush people and the Chechen-Ingush ASSR was abolished, the village of Chozhi-Chu was renamed to Vysokogornoye, and settled by people from other ethnic groups. From 1944 to 1957, it was a part of the Novoselsky District of Grozny Oblast.

In 1958, after the Vaynakh people returned and the Chechen-Ingush ASSR was restored, the village regained its old name, Chozhi-Chu.

In 1976, an earthquake occurred, which destroyed more than half of the households in Chozhi-Chu.

== Population ==
The village of Chozhi-Chu is displayed as a residential settlement on the map from 1988. The village was probably abandoned by residents in the 1990s. Currently, no structures or signs of population are visible on satellite images at the site of the village.

There is no known population data for Chozhi-Chu.
