= Shaami-Yurt =

Village in Achkhoy-Martanovsky District, Russia

Coordinates: 43°14′00″N 45°23′11″E

Shaami-Yurt (Russian: Шаами-Юрт, Chechen: ШаӀми-Йурт, Şajmi-Yurt) is a rural locality (a selo) in Achkhoy-Martanovsky District, Chechnya.

== Administrative and municipal status ==
Municipally, Shaami-Yurt is incorporated as Shaami-Yurtovskoye rural settlement. It is the administrative center of the municipality and is the only settlement included in it.

== Geography ==
Map of Achkhoy-Martanovsky District with Shami-Yurt highlighted

Shaami-Yurt is located between the Fortanga and Shalazha rivers, near to the confluence with the Assa River. It is located 11 kilometres (6.8 mi) north-east of the town of Achkhoy-Martan and 25 kilometres (16 mi) south-west of the city of Grozny. The Caucasus highway runs to the north of the village.

The nearest settlements to Shaami-Yurt are Davydenko and Samashki in the north-west, Zakan-Yurt in the north-east, Khambi-Irze and Kulary in the east, Gekhi and Valerik in the south-east, and Katyr-Yurt in the south-west.

== History ==
In 1944, after the genocide and deportation of the Chechen and Ingush people and the Chechen-Ingush ASSR was abolished, the village of Shama-Yurt was renamed to Zelyonaya Roshcha (roughly translates as Green Grove), and settled by people from other ethnic groups. From 1944 to 1957, it was a part of the Novoselsky District of Grozny Oblast.

In 1957, when the Vaynakh people returned and the Chechen-Ingush ASSR was restored, the village regained its old name, Shaami-Yurt.

== Shaami-Yurt in the Chechen Wars ==
During the First Chechen War, Shaami-Yurt and its environs were known mainly as locations for militants. So in early 1995, front-line and army aviation launched a series of missile-bombing attacks at their places of concentration in the villages of Starye Atagi, Novye Atagi, Shaami-Yurt, Shali and Mesker-Yurt.

In the summer of 1999, during the period of the Khasavyurt Accord, a group of people in Shaami-Yurt held Samara journalist Viktor Petrov and head of the regional branch of the "Congress of Soviet Mothers" Svetlana Kuzmin, as hostages. After the escape of Viktor Petrov and the release of Svetlana Kuzmina, some participants in their abduction were arrested in Shaami-Yurt.

In the fall of 1999, during the Second Chechen War, the village was bombarded by federal troops under the command of Vladimir Shamanov, which led to civilian casualties and started proceedings in international courts. The applicants, including the inhabitants of the village of Shaami-Yurt, represented the Human Rights Organization "Memorial". At the end of 2000, Vladimir Shamanov tried to claim that the military operation in Shaami-Yurt had to be carried out because the militants turned a number of settlements, including Shaami-Yurt, into strongholds. Then, at the beginning of 2000, according to Sergey Yastrzhembsky, active hostilities took place in Shaami-Yurt. At the same time, news agencies reported that the federal forces opened fire on the militants in the area of the settlements of Katyr-Yurt and Shaami-Yurt, located to the south-west of the Chechen capital, Grozny.

According to the Human Rights Organization "Memorial", in February 2000, at the command of the federal forces, deliberately within the framework of the developed military operation, a false “corridor” for the Chechen armed detachments to leave Grozny was opened. This "corridor", leading to minefields and ambushes, opened up the way for militants to a number of villages, including the notorious Katyr-Yurt, which had already been declared a "security zone" by the federal authorities. As a result, a number of villages - Alkhan-Kala, Katyr-Yurt, Shaami-Yurt, and Zakan-Yurt - when Chechen troops passed through them, and even after they left these settlements, underwent extremely strong artillery and missile-bombing attacks. Subsequently, the bombing of these settlements, among which was Shaami-Yurt, led to terrible damage. There were numerous casualties among the civilian population. The event later became known as the Katyr-Yurt Massacre, where the worst of the attacks on the villages happened.

In 2002-2004, Shaami-Yurt and its environs were characterized by local fighting, attempts to undermine the village administration building, shelling, the bombing of armored personnel carriers, killings of federal forces, bombings of law enforcement vehicles, the discovery of hiding places with explosives and weapons, shelling of columns with humanitarian aid, the detention of abducted persons, and the creation of extremist literature.

== Population ==
- 1990 Census: 2,814
- 2002 Census: 3,202
- 2010 Census: 4,018
- 2019 estimate: 4,841

According to the results of the 2010 Census, the majority of residents of Achkhoy-Martan (4,014 or 99.9%) were ethnic Chechens, with 4 people (0.1%) coming from other ethnic backgrounds.

== Infrastructure ==
Shaami-Yurt hosts one mosque, which was restored in 2007 at the request of the residents of the village.

== Education ==
In 2007, the grand opening of the renovated secondary school of the village of Shaami-Yurt took place, in which the President of the Chechen Republic Ramzan Kadyrov took part. Also, a separate building with 300 places for elementary grade students was built on the territory of the school. Overall, Shaami-Yurt school is able to accept 800 students.

== Culture ==
Since 2009, as part of the presidential program to revive and preserve the customs and traditions of the Chechen people, the Ministry of Culture of the Chechen Republic has been conducting events throughout the republic. For example, in Shaami-Yurt, theatrical performances dedicated to the onset of spring, “Дуьххара гота якхар", which roughly translates as "Feast of the First Furrow".

== Sport ==
In the village of Shaami-Yurt, horse racing is held, which attracts several thousand spectators from all regions of the republic.

According to Novaya Gazeta, on March 26, 2007, a sports center was opened in the village in which the head of the administration, Said-Magomed Bagaev, taught children and adolescents about the basics of Jujitsu.
