= Khambi-Irze =

Village in Achkhoy-Martanovsky District, Russia

Coordinates: 43°14′03″N 45°27′06″E

Khambi-Irze (Russian: Хамби-Ирзи, Chechen: Хаьмбин-Ирзе, Xämbin-Irze) is a rural locality (a selo) in Achkhoy-Martanovsky District, Chechnya.

== Administrative and municipal status ==
Municipally, Khambi-Irze is incorporated as Khambi-Irzinskoye rural settlement. It is the administrative center of the municipality and is the only settlement included in it.

== Geography ==
Map of Achkhoy-Martanovsky District with Khambi-Irze highlighted

Khambi-Irze is located on the left bank of the Sunzha River. It is located 18 kilometres (11 mi) north-east of the town of Achkhoy-Martan and 20 kilometres (12 mi) south-west of the city of Grozny.

The nearest settlements to Khambi-Irze are Alkhan-Kala in the north-east, Kulary in the east, Gekhi in the south-east, Valerik in the south-west, Shaami-Yurt in the west, and Zakan-Yurt in the north-west.

== History ==
In 1944, after the genocide and deportation of the Chechen and Ingush people and the Chechen-Ingush ASSR was abolished, the village of Khambi-Irze (then, Khadis-Yurt) was renamed to Lermontovo, and settled by people from other ethnic groups. From 1944 to 1957, it was a part of the Novoselsky District of Grozny Oblast.

In 1958, after the Vaynakh people returned and the Chechen-Ingush ASSR was restored, the village was renamed again to Lermontov-Yurt.

In the early 1990s, the modern name, Khambi-Irze was given to the village.

== Population ==
- 1990 Census: 2,144
- 2002 Census: 3,123
- 2010 Census: 3,297
- 2019 estimate: 3,852

According to the results of the 2010 Census, the majority of residents of Khambi-Irze were ethnic Chechens.
