= Valerik, Achkhoy-Martanovsky District =

Village in Achkhoy-Martanovsky District, Russia

Coordinates: 43°10′35″N 45°24′15″E

Valerik (Russian: Валерик, Chechen: ВаларгтӀе, Valergthe) is a rural locality (a selo) in Achkhoy-Martanovsky District, Chechnya.

== Administrative and municipal status ==
Municipally, Valerik is incorporated as Valerikskoye rural settlement. It is the administrative center of the municipality and the only settlement included in it.

== Geography ==
Map of Achkhoy-Martanovsky District with Valerik highlighted

Valerik is located on both banks of the Valerik River. It is located 7 kilometres (4.3 mi) east of the village of Achkhoy-Martan and 25 kilometres (16 mi) south-west of the city of Grozny.

The nearest settlements to Valerik are Zakan-Yurt in the north, Khambi-Irze and Kulary in the north-east, Gekhi in the east, Gekhi-Chu and Shalazhi in the south, Katyr-Yurt in the west, and Shaami-Yurt in the north-west.

== History ==
In 1944, after the genocide and deportation of the Chechen and Ingush people and the Chechen-Ingush ASSR was abolished, the village of Valerik was renamed and settled by other ethnic groups. From 1944 to 1957, it was a part of the Novoselsky District of Grozny Oblast.

In 1958, after the Vaynakh people returned and the Chechen-Ingush ASSR was restored, the village regained its old name, Valerik.

== Population ==
- 1979 Census: 5,065
- 1990 Census: 5,750
- 2002 Census: 6,012
- 2010 Census: 8,023
- 2019 estimate: 9,483

According to the results of the 2010 Census, the majority of residents of Valerik were ethnic Chechens.

== Infrastructure ==
Valerik hosts an elementary school, two secondary schools, and a local mosque.
