= Bamut =

Rural locality in Chechnya

Bamut Бамут
- Selo

Other transcription(s)
  - Chechen: Буммат
  - Ingush: Бlуммат
- Interactive map of Bamut
- Location of Bamut Bamut (Chechnya)
- Coordinates: 43°09′48″N 45°12′03″E
- Country: Russia
- Federal subject: Chechnya
- Elevation: 350 m (1,150 ft)

Population (2010 Census)
  - Total: 6,025
  - Estimate (2021): 5,838 (−3.1%)

Administrative status
  - Subordinated to: Sernovodsky District
- Time zone: UTC+3 (MSK)
- Postal code: 366610
- OKTMO ID: 96631409101

Bamut (Note: Russian: Бамут, Chechen: Буммат, romanized: Bummat; historically sometimes spelled as Bumut (Russian: Бумут).) is a non-residential rural locality (a selo) in Sernovodsky District of the Republic of Chechnya, Russia.

== Administrative and municipal status ==
Municipally, Bamut is incorporated as Bamutskoye rural settlement. It is the administrative center of the municipality and is the only settlement included in it.

== Geography ==
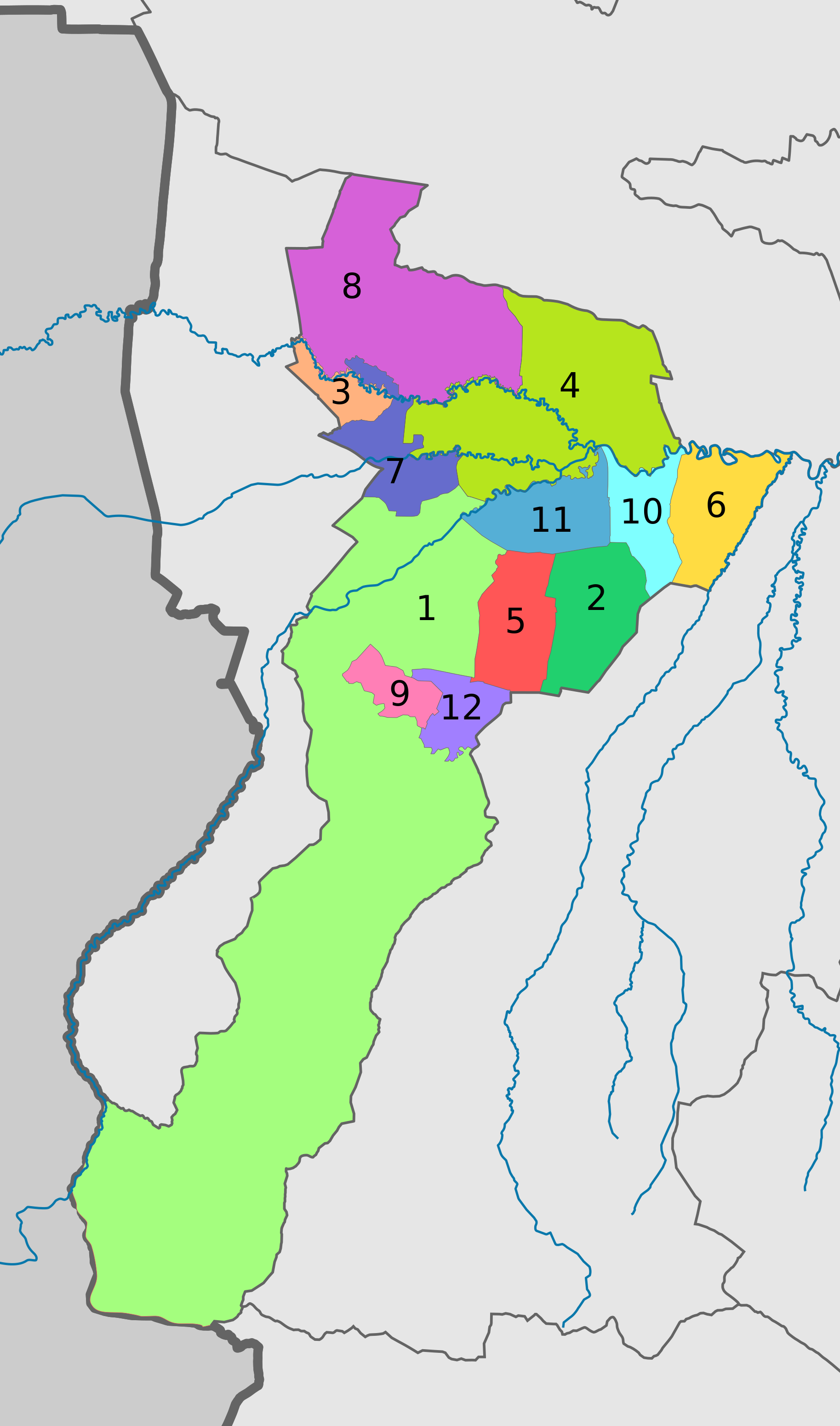
Map of Achkhoy-Martanovsky District (until 8 Sep 2019). Bamut is in the west

Bamut is located on both banks of the Fortanga River. It is located 8 kilometres (5 mi) west of the town of Achkhoy-Martan and 50 kilometres (31 mi) west of the city of Grozny.

The nearest settlements to Bamut are Katyr-Yurt in the east, Shalazhi, Stary Achkhoy and Yandi in the south-east, Arshty in the south-west, Nesterovskaya in the north-west, and Assinovskaya and Novy Sharoy in the north.

== History ==
=== Background ===
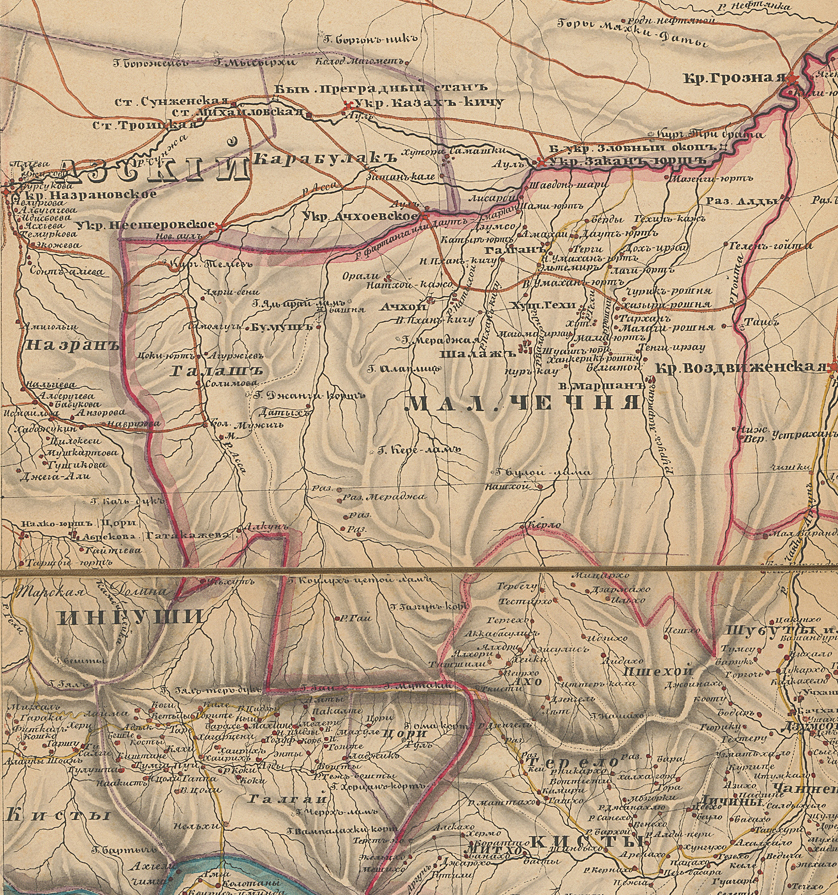
The first map which documented Bamut, 1847.

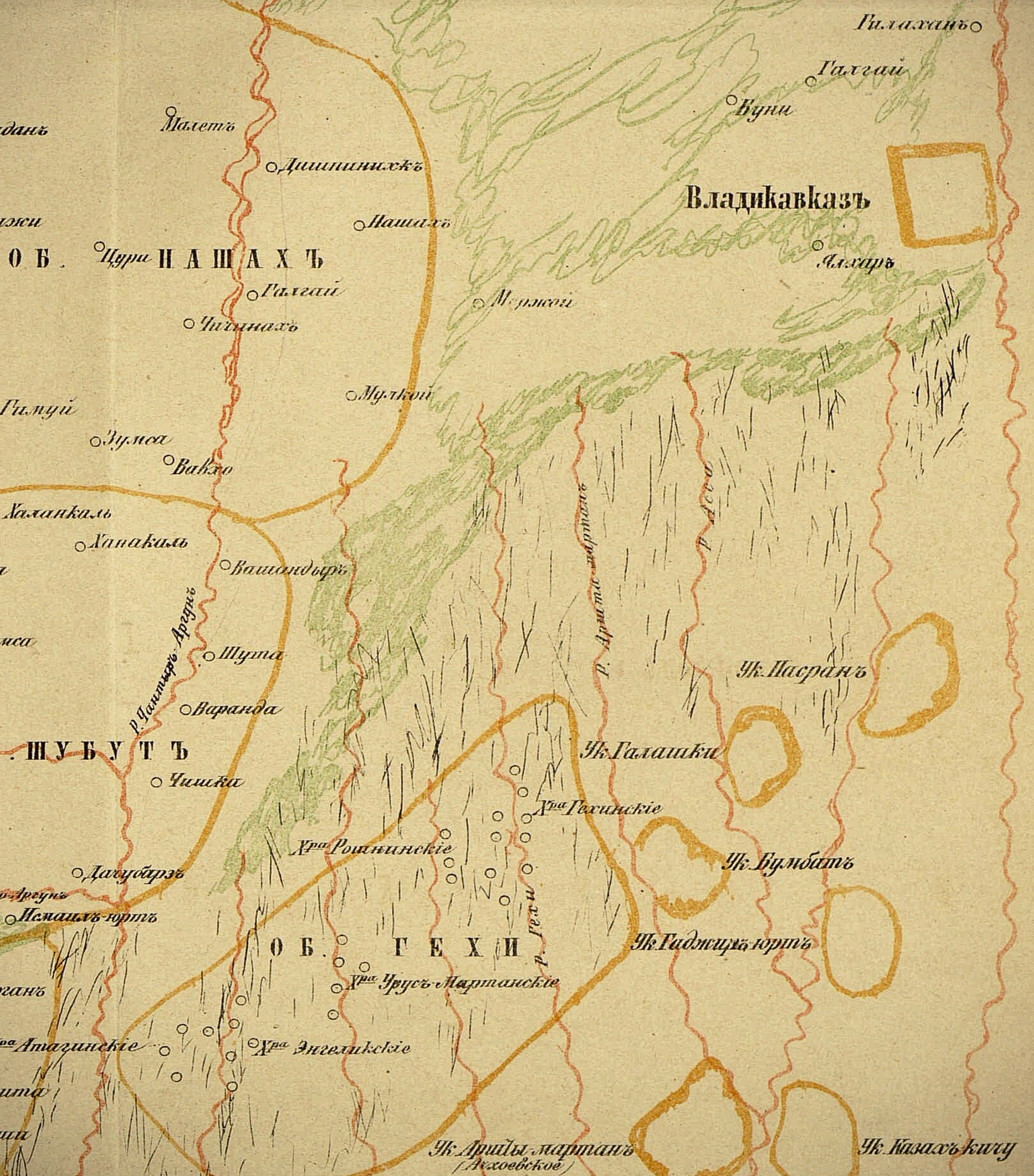
Fortress Bumbat (Bamut) on a fragment of the map of the Imamate on 27 Muharram 1273 (1856 in Gregorian calendar), translated from Arabic to Russian in 1856.

The territory on which Bamut is located and its surrounding area were inhabited by people from ancient times as attested by burials and archaeological monuments dating back to the Bronze Age and late Middle Ages (16–17th centuries).

Although Bamut was in the area of settlement and migration movement on the plane of the Orstkhoys in the second half of the 18th century, its earliest documentation dates to a Russian map of 1847. Therefore, it was founded no earlier than the 1840s. The village was first settled by the Gandaloev family who migrated from Gandalbos. Later, families from Tsecha-Akhki and Akki also settled into the village. In the second half of the 1840s and until the early 1850s, during the Caucasian War, Bamut was part of the administrative-territorial district (naibstvo) of the Caucasian Imamate, Little Chechnya, whose name was conditional considering the fact that it was populated not only by Chechens but also by Ingush, predominantly in its western part.

Bamut, among other villages of Karabulak and Galashian societies, was conquered after the winter expedition of 1850 under the command of Mikhail Ilyinsky. The western part of the territory of the former Little Chechnya was included in the Vladikavkazsky okrug and administratively subordinated to the head of the Verkhne-Sunzhenskaya line. In 1852, a fortification for two infantry companies was founded near Bamut in order to cover one of the main entrances to the lands of the Galashian society from Chechnya. From 1922 to 1934, Bamut was a part of the Ingush Autonomous Oblast.

=== Soviet rule ===
From 1922 to 1934, Bamut was a part of the Ingush Autonomous Oblast.

On May 26 1926, 50 Cossacks of the Assinovskaya stanitsa who went to mow grass near the Ingush village of Bamut, were surrounded by up to 100 Ingush people with a demand to follow them. Some of the Cossacks fled, and the remaining 11 were captured and taken away by the Ingush to the village Bamut, where they were accused of mowing grass on lands belonging to the Ingush.

In 1944, after the genocide and deportation of the Chechen and Ingush people and the Chechen-Ingush ASSR was abolished, the village of Bamut was renamed to Bukovka, and settled by people from the neighboring republic of Dagestan. From 1944 to 1957, it was a part of the Vedensky District of the Dagestan ASSR.

In 1958, after the Vaynakh people returned and the Chechen-Ingush ASSR was restored, the village regained its old Chechen name, Bummat.

During the First Chechen War, the infamous Battle of Bamut occurred in the village.

At the start of the Second Chechen War, in the fall of 1999, the territory of Bamut was completely closed to civilians. The settlement was only unblocked again in April 2002.

In the fall of 2014, by decree of the leadership of the Chechen Republic, a large-scale restoration of the village, which was completely destroyed, was launched. The opening of the revived village of Bamut took place on 3 December 2014.

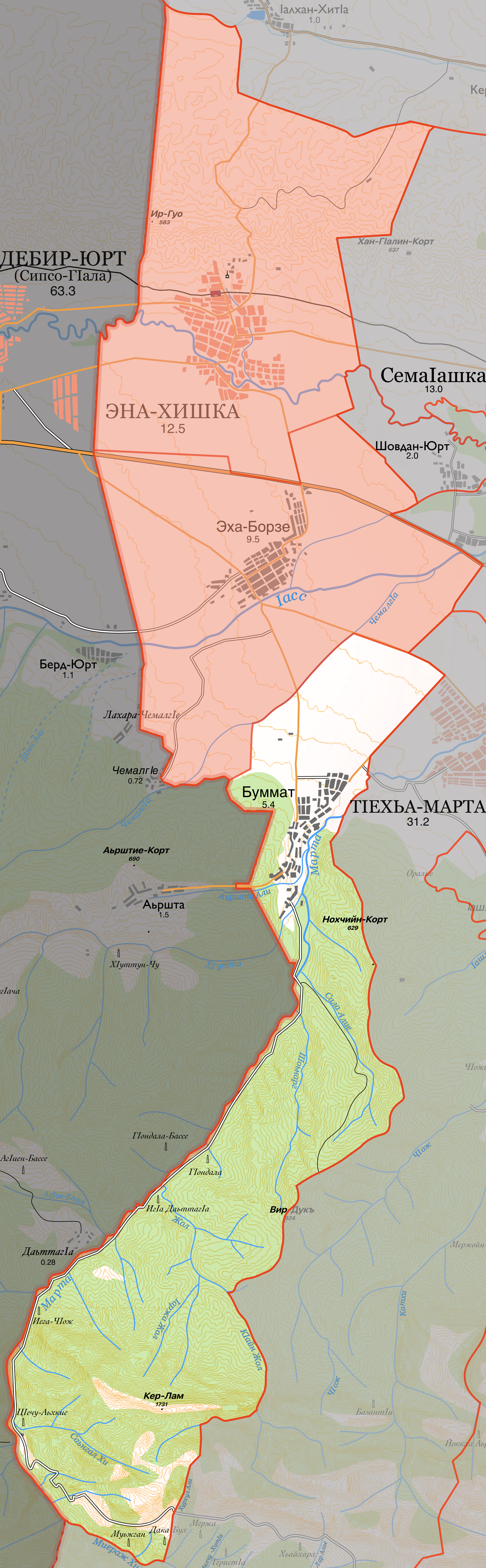
Map of Sunzhensky District. Bamut is in the south-east

On 8 September 2019, a referendum was held in Bamut on the transfer of the settlement to the Chechen section of Sunzhensky District. According to the official results, 1,565 people (73.61% of residents of Bamut) took part in the referendum, in which 84.98% of people voted in favor of the transfer, and 14.82% of people voted against it.

== Population ==
Population of Bamut was majority Ingush in 1926.

- 1990 Census: 5,858
- 2002 Census: 5,137
- 2010 Census: 6,025
- 2019 estimate: 5,589

According to the results of the 2010 Census, the majority of residents of Bamut (6,013 or 99.80%) were ethnic Chechens, with 12 people (0.20%) coming from other ethnic backgrounds.

According to the 2002 Census, 5,137 people (2,465 men and 2,672 women) lived in Bamut.

== Sources ==
- Берже, А. П. (1859). Чечня и чеченцы [Chechnya and Chechens] (in Russian). Тифлис: Типография Главного Управления Наместника Кавказского. pp. 1–141.
- Берже, А. П. (1991) [1859]. Куприянова, Е. А. (ed.). Чечня и чеченцы [Chechnya and Chechens] (in Russian). Грозный [Тифлис]: Книга [Тип. гл. упр. Наместника Кавк.] pp. 1–107.
- Ужахов, М. Г. (1927). Ингушско-русский словарик [Ingush-Russian dictionary] (in Ingush and Russian). Владикавказ: Крайнациздат. pp. 1–185.
- Барахоева, Н. М.; Кодзоев, Н. Д.; Хайров, Б. А. (2016). Ингушско-русский словарь терминов [Ingush-Russian dictionary of terms] (in Ingush and Russian) (2 ed.). Нальчик: ООО «Тетраграф». pp. 1–288.
- Kartoev, Magomet (2015). "Историческая справка о сельском поселении Бамут" [Historical information about the rural settlement of Bamut]. Bulletin of Ingush research institute of Humanities named after Ch. E. Akhriev (in Russian) (1). Magas: 44–47.
- Кодзоев, Н. Д. (2021). Хайрова, Р. Р. (ed.). Русско-ингушский словарь [Russian-Ingush dictionary] (in Ingush and Russian). Ростов-на-Дону. pp. 1–656. ISBN 978-5-906785-55-8.
- Общенациональная Комиссия по рассмотрению вопросов, связанных с определением территории и границ Ингушетии (2021). Всемирный конгресс ингушского народа (ed.). Доклад о границах и территории Ингушетии (общие положения) [Report on the borders and territory of Ingushetia (general provisions)] (archival documents, maps, illustrations) (in Russian). Назрань. pp. 1–175.
- Мальсагов, З. К. (1963). Оздоева, Ф. (ed.). Грамматика ингушского языка [Grammar of the Ingush language] (in Ingush and Russian). Vol. 5 (2nd ed.). Грозный: Чечено-Ингушское Книжное Издательство. pp. 1–164.
- Оздоев, И. А. (1980). Оздоева, Ф. Г.; Куркиев, А. С. (eds.). Русско-ингушский словарь: 40 000 слов [Russian-Ingush dictionary: 40,000 words] (in Ingush and Russian). Москва: Русский язык. pp. 1–832.
