= Samashki massacre =

1995 massacre by Russian forces in Chechnya

- Part of the First Chechen War and Chechen genocide
- Location of Samashki in Chechnya
- Location: 43°17′26″N 45°18′0″E; Samashki, Chechnya
- Date: 7-8 April 1995
- Target: Chechen civilians
- Attack type: Genocidal massacre, looting, arson, rape, war crime
- Deaths: 100-300 civilians executed or killed
- Perpetrator: Russia
- Motive: Genocidal intent (Note: According to State Duma member Anatoly Shabad and Moscow Times.), anti-Chechen sentiment

The Samashki massacre (Russian: Резня в Самашках) was the mass murder of Chechen civilians by Russian Forces in April 1995 during the First Chechen War. Hundreds of Chechen civilians died as result of a Russian "cleansing operation" and the bombardment of the village. Most of the victims were shot at close range or killed by grenades thrown into basements where they were hiding. Others were burned alive or were shot while trying to escape their burning houses. Much of the village was destroyed and the local school blown up by Russian forces as they withdrew. The incident attracted wide attention in Russia and abroad.

The March 1996 United Nations Commission on Human Rights (UNCHR) report said:

It is reported that a massacre of over 100 people, mainly civilians, occurred between 7 and 8 April 1995 in the village of Samashki, in the west of Chechnya. According to the accounts of 128 eye-witnesses, Federal soldiers deliberately and arbitrarily attacked civilians and civilian dwellings in Samashki by shooting residents and burning houses with flame-throwers. The majority of the witnesses reported that many OMON troops were drunk or under the influence of drugs. They wantonly opened fire or threw grenades into basements where residents, mostly women, elderly persons and children, had been hiding.

According to Human Rights Watch (HRW), this was the most notorious civilian massacre of the First Chechen War. The International Committee of the Red Cross (ICRC) announced that approximately 250 civilians were killed. According to Amnesty International and HRW that up to 300 people were executed or killed, while the elders of Samashki stated that up to 300 residents were killed during the attack.

== Operation ==
The Russian Ministry of Internal Affairs (MVD) forces (identified as Sofrinskaya Brigade of the Internal Troops, Moscow Oblast OMON and Orenburg SOBR, some of Moscow policemen and possibly members of the elite counter-terrorist unit Vityaz) began an operation to "mop up" the village (zachistka—an intense search of the streets, house-by-house) on April 7, in the area around the train station, and then, on April 8, through the entire village. According to Lt. Gen. Anatoly Antonov, deputy commander of the MVD forces in Chechnya, it was "the first completely independent military operation by MVD troops," carried out by combined units of more than 3,000 MVD troops, including 350 from the storm detachments. Artillery, a multiple rocket launcher battery, and tanks had also been deployed around Samashki. Interfax reported that Russian forces fired Uragan (BM-27) and Grad (BM-21) rockets on the village.

Despite claims by Russian military sources, armed resistance in Samashki was not organized in nature, as the main Chechen rebel forces left the village following the Russian ultimatum by Generals Antonov, Kulikov and Romanov, ending on April 6, 1995, to hand over the 264 automatic weapons supposedly present in Samashki (the villagers had handed in 11 automatic weapons). Before the ultimatum, Samashki had already been under siege for a prolonged period of time, and several failed storming attempts by the Russian forces had been undertaken since the beginning of the war in December 1994. However, the main force of more than 200 fighters left Samashki under the pressure of the village elders who wanted the village spared. The same elders and the village mullah were fired on by the Russians on the morning of April 7 while returning from the negotiations before the federal attack; the military command announced that it was the separatists who had shot at the elders. Nevertheless, a lightly armed village militia of some 40 self-defense fighters, all of them local residents, resisted the MVD and fighting ensued. A group of 12 fighters immediately broke out from the village, while the other groups put a Russian tank and two armoured personnel carriers (APCs) out of action before retreating as well. Both sides took casualties; two Russian troopers and four self-defense fighters have presumably been killed in combat. Several Russian armoured vehicles were lost during their advance due to land mines.

The number of casualties among the MVD forces as released by the Russian commanders and spokesmen varies considerably, ranging from none dead and 14 wounded to 16 dead and 44 wounded, including Captain Viktor Adamishin who was posthumously awarded the title of Hero of the Russian Federation. According to Stanislav Govorukhin from the Russian parliamentary commission, some 350 Russian troops were wounded and 16 killed out of the total of about 350 who took part in the combat operation (meaning every participant to have sustained wounds), whereas a later report does not mention the number of 350 wounded. The federal officials also claimed that 120 "pro-Dudayev fighters" were killed in the village and that some 150 suspects were detained. The Information Telegraph Agency of Russia quoted Vladimir Vorozhtsov, chief spokesman of the regional Russian command, as denying any large number of civilian casualties. In the same report, however, Gen. Antonov was quoted as saying "many" civilians had been killed in Samashki but they were supposedly killed by Chechen fighters. In the May 1995 press conference, Gen. Kulikov said: "This is warfare. They fired at us. We did not fire first. It is true that 120 residents died, but they were people who resisted us and fought us."

== War crimes ==
In 1996, Memorial compiled an incomplete list of 103, mostly male, villagers confirmed dead. Their minimum estimate of the general number of deceased was 112–144 people (in 2008, Memorial leader Oleg Orlov, who went into Samashki soon after the events of April 7–8, said he saw nearly 150 dead bodies), including some ethnic Russian residents. Russian troops intentionally burned many bodies, either by throwing the bodies into burning houses or by setting them on fire. Many of the burned corpses could not be identified and are not on the list. The majority of those killed were summarily executed during the house-to-house searches. The victims, which included elderly Chechen World War II (WWII) veterans and at least three (four according to the Ingush commission) ethnic Russians, were usually executed by shooting at close range or killed with grenades in the basements, but some were beaten to death. Several of the other victims were apparently burned alive or shot while trying to escape the burning houses. Of the remaining deceased, 29 were established to having been killed by possibly combat-related causes (such as artillery and tank fire, conducted since the night of April 6, or armoured vehicle fire).

The male population of the village was detained indiscriminately in the hundreds and taken to the "filtration camp" in the town of Mozdok in North Ossetia or to the temporary holding center in the nearby Chechen village of Assinovskaya (a number of them were executed during the march while tied to the armoured vehicles). There, the detainees were beaten and mistreated, and many of them were tortured; most of these who survived were released after a few days. The killings and the round-up were accompanied by widespread arbitrary and wanton destruction of property by Russian troops, as well as numerous reports of theft and pillaging. Hundreds of buildings were either destroyed (375 according to the May 1, 1995 U.S. Congressional hearing of Sergei Kovalev) or seriously damaged. The majority of the village's homes were destroyed in premeditated arson by the Russian troops; even the local school where the troops quartered was blown up as they left the village.

A Chechen surgeon, Khassan Baiev, treated wounded in Samashki immediately after the operation and described the scene in his book:

Dozens of charred corpses of women and children lay in the courtyard of the mosque, which had been destroyed. The first thing my eye fell on was the burned body of a baby, lying in fetal position... A wild-eyed woman emerged from a burned-out house holding a dead baby. Trucks with bodies piled in the back rolled through the streets on the way to the cemetery.
While treating the wounded, I heard stories of young men - gagged and trussed up - dragged with chains behind personnel carriers. I heard of Russian aviators who threw Chechen prisoners, screaming, out their helicopters. There were rapes, but it was hard to know how many because women were too ashamed to report them. One girl was raped in front of her father. I heard of one case in which the mercenary grabbed a newborn baby, threw it among each other like a ball, then shot it dead in the air.
Leaving the village for the hospital in Grozny, I passed a Russian armored personnel carrier with the word SAMASHKI written on its side in bold, black letters. I looked in my rearview mirror and to my horror saw a human skull mounted on the front of the vehicle. The bones were white; someone must have boiled the skull to remove the flesh.

== Aftermath ==
Up until April 10, villagers were not permitted to take out their wounded, while doctors and ICRC representatives were denied entry to the closed-off village (the Red Cross was authorized to enter only on April 27); consequently, at least 13 of the wounded people died from lack of medical aid. From April 10 to 15 only Chechen women were allowed to go either way through the military cordon outside of the village. When Western reporters were allowed into Samashki for the first time since the assault on April 14, they found the village "littered with decomposing bodies."

== Reaction ==
At around the time of the incident, Russian President Boris Yeltsin compared the Chechens to the Nazis during the 50th anniversary of the Soviet Union's victory in World War II. The news of the massacre embarrassed Yeltsin's foreign guests, including Bill Clinton and John Major. The European Union expressed its concern regarding the incident, while Washington had warned that the events of Chechnya could wreck the anniversary event.

Member of the State Duma Anatoly Shabad, who was smuggled to the village by Chechen women, compared the Russian troops to Nazi extermination squads: "What happened there was a large-scale punitive operation aimed at destroying the population. There was no organized resistance in Samashki. It was surely planned with the idea to kill as many as possible, in order to achieve a threatening effect." The head of the Department of Caucasian Studies at the Russian Academy of Sciences Sergei Arutiunov compared the massacre to that of "Khatyn in Belarus, Lidice in Czechoslovakia" and said that the name Samashki "sounds more sinister than My Lai in Vietnam." The English-language newspaper The Moscow News wrote in an editorial: "What the Russians did in Samashki is what the Germans did to us throughout the war [WWII], but Russians did this to their own people. And that is unforgivable. What happened in Samashki during those days has only one definition. Genocide." On the other hand, Stanislav Govorukhin of the official commission said "nothing unethical" has happened in Samashki.

The brutality displayed in Samashki by Russian MVD forces succeeded in terrorizing many in Chechnya. Soon afterwards, neighboring towns and villages capitulated to the federal forces. Several other villages through Chechnya made bilateral truces with the Russians and asked the Chechen separatist forces to leave, although they secretly kept supporting Dudayev's government.

== See also ==
- Novye-Aldy massacre
- Alkhan-Yurt massacre
- Bucha massacre
- Katyr-Yurt massacre
- List of massacres in Russia
