= Battle of Bamut =

1995–1996 battle of the First Chechen War

- Part of the First Chechen War
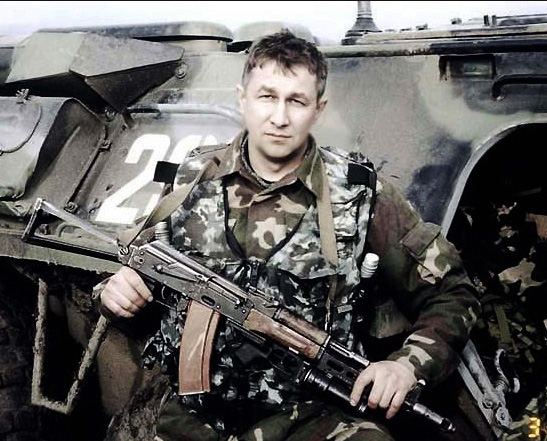
- Russian soldier in Bamut
Date	10 March 1995 – 24 May 1996
Location	Bamut, Chechnya
Result	Russian victory
Territorial changes	Bamut captured by Russian forces

Belligerents
Russia	Chechen Republic of Ichkeria

Commanders and leaders
(Russia) Vladimir Shamanov (Russia) Anatoly Kulikov	(Chechen Republic of Ichkeria) Ruslan Khaikhoroev; (Chechen Republic of Ichkeria) Khizir Khachukaev; (Chechen Republic of Ichkeria) Shirvani Albakov

Units involved
58th Army; 136th Guards Motor Rifle Brigade; 166th Motor Rifle Brigade; 324th Motorized Rifle Regiment; Sofrino Brigade; MVD Internal Troops; 94th Commandant's Battalion; 7th OSN "Rosich"; 1st OSN "Vityaz"; GRU Spetsnaz	Galanchozh Regiment; Khaikoroev Battalion; Amriev's "Assa" Detachment

Strength
1995: ~2,160 troops 1996: ~2,610 troops Equipment (1996): 45 tanks, 115 BMPs, 17 BTRs, 75 artillery pieces, helicopters, and 18 Su-24/Su-25 aircraft	100–300 fighters Per Russia: 1,000+

Casualties and losses
- Casualties and material damage

The Battle of Bamut was a prolonged military engagement during the First Chechen War that lasted from 10 March 1995 to 24 May 1996. The battle for the village of Bamut and its surrounding heights became one of the most intense and symbolic of the conflict, as Chechen forces utilized decommissioned Soviet missile silos to withstand more than a year of Russian assaults. Russian federal forces under the command of Major General Vladimir Shamanov eventually captured the settlement in May 1996. The battle resulted in the complete destruction of the village.

== Background ==
Bamut, located in the Achkhoy-Martanovsky District, became one of the most fortified Chechen strongholds during the First Chechen War. Its defenses were unique due to the presence of a decommissioned Soviet Strategic Rocket Forces facility nearby. The nuclear missile base, which had formerly housed the 178th Missile Regiment's silos, was utilized by Chechen fighters as a network of hardened bunkers and underground shelters. These Soviet-era catacombs were essentially immune to standard Russian artillery and aerial bombardment, allowing the defenders to survive prolonged sieges.

== Battle ==
=== 1995 Assaults ===
Following the fall of Grozny in early 1995, Russian federal forces shifted their focus to the western highlands. The first major assault on Bamut began on 10 March 1995. Russian troops, including elements of the MVD (Interior Ministry) special forces and the Sofrino Brigade, attempted to seize the village but faced stiff resistance.

On 15 April, federal forces launched a full-scale assault to secure the high ground overlooking the village, specifically "Bald Mountain" (Lysaya Gora). The Chechen defenders, leveraging the former missile base infrastructure, effectively held their positions. On 18 April, a unit of the MVD "Rosich" special forces detachment was ambushed on the mountain, suffering heavy casualties in a close-quarters engagement.

A second major offensive was launched in late May 1995. From 21–23 May, federal forces massed significant firepower, including two infantry brigades and Su-24 bombers, around the village. On 24 May 1995, Russian sources reported that they had occupied Bamut. However, this control proved tenuous; Chechen fighters had retreated to the trench lines and underground bunkers, continuing to attack federal troops. Despite the announcement of victory, Russian forces were unable to secure the village permanently and were eventually forced to withdraw, leaving Bamut in separatist hands for another year.

=== Capture in 1996 ===
By the spring of 1996, Bamut remained the only major separatist stronghold in the flatlands of Chechnya that had not been captured. In May 1996, Major General Vladimir Shamanov assumed command of the operation to take the village. Learning from the failures of 1995, Shamanov utilized a strategy of bypassing the main defenses to encircle the village while subjecting it to intense airstrikes.

The final assault concluded on 24 May 1996, exactly one year after the failed 1995 declaration of victory. According to contemporary reports, Shamanov's troops seized Bamut after fierce fighting. While official Russian sources claimed the operation was a tactical success with limited casualties (reporting roughly 20-30 killed), independent observers and later analyses suggested significantly higher losses, with some sources citing "hundreds" of Russian soldiers killed during the prolonged siege and final storming.

The Chechen defense was led by Ruslan Khaikhoroev. As the Russian encirclement tightened, the majority of the Chechen garrison, including Khaikhoroev, managed to slip away under the cover of darkness and fog, retreating into the densely forested mountains of Ingushetia. When Russian forces finally cleared the village, they found it completely destroyed and largely deserted. The capture of Bamut marked the elimination of the last organized static defense by Chechen forces in the western sector, marking a Russian military victory.

== Casualties and material damage ==
Casualty figures for the Battle of Bamut are heavily disputed, with significant discrepancies between official Russian military reports, independent estimates and Chechen claims. Due to the prolonged nature of the siege (spanning 1995 to 1996) and the irregular nature of the Chechen defense, precise numbers for both sides remain difficult to verify.

=== Russian forces ===
Official Russian accounts generally cite low casualty figures, particularly for the final assault in 1996. According to General Vladimir Shamanov, federal forces suffered 52 casualties during the final operation in late May 1996, including 21 killed and 31 wounded. These figures are corroborated by Russian military historian Nikolai Grodnensky, whose history of the war lists 21 dead and 54 wounded for the same period. General Gennady Troshev also cites 21 killed in his memoirs.

However, independent and Western sources suggest these official numbers may underestimate the toll. A 1995 Los Angeles Times report noted 15 Russian soldiers killed in a single earlier engagement in April 1995. For the final 1996 assault, the Jamestown Foundation reported that "hundreds of Russian soldiers were killed". Additionally, a chronology by the CIA and OSCE notes that Russian commanders admitted to approximately 40 killed and 48 wounded during counterattacks in late May 1996 alone, nearly double the official "final assault" death toll.

=== Chechen forces ===
Data on Chechen losses is scarce. Academic sources note that while Chechen defenders admitted to "many killed and wounded" in retrospective interviews, no written records were kept by the separatist fighters.

Russian military statements consistently placed Chechen casualties in the hundreds. Following the initial major assaults in April 1995, General Anatoly Kulikov publicly estimated that "the battle for Bamut killed 400 Chechen fighters".

German researchers Kubanek and Maaß also list a figure of approximately 400 Chechen fighters killed during the final assault in 1996, this only states the official Russian reporting noted above. In contrast, Chechen accounts suggest lower fatalities but a high number of wounded, though no specific counts exist.

=== Material losses ===
The village of Bamut itself was effectively obliterated. By the end of the siege in May 1996, the settlement was described as "completely destroyed," with its infrastructure and housing stock rendered uninhabitable.

== In works of art ==
- "Бамут" - a song by Musa Nasagaev.
- "Бамут" - a song by Timur Mutsurayev.
- "Я убит под Бамутом" - a song written by Russian soldiers of the military unit 5598 26 BON in 1996.
