= Novy Sharoy =

Village in Achkhoy-Martanovsky District, Russia

Coordinates: 43°15′16″N 45°16′40″E

Novy Sharoy (Russian: Новый Шарой, Chechen: Керла-Шара, Kerla-Şara) is a rural locality (a selo) in Achkhoy-Martanovsky District, Chechnya.

== Administrative and municipal status ==
Municipally, Novy Sharoy is incorporated as Novo-Sharoyskoye rural settlement. It is the administrative center of the municipality and is the only settlement included in it.

== Geography ==
Map of Achkhoy-Martanovsky District with Novy Sharoy highlighted

Novy Sharoy is located on the left bank of the Assa River. It is located 5 kilometres (3.1 mi) north of the town of Achkhoy-Martan and 37 kilometres (23 mi) south-west of the city of Grozny. The village is on the south-western outskirts of the Samashki Forest.

The nearest settlements to Novy Shary are Shaami-Yurt in the south-east, Achkhoy-Martan in the south, Assinovskaya in the south-west, Sernovodskoye in the north-west, Davydenko and Samashki in the north.

== History ==
In 1957, after the Vaynakh people returned from the genocide and deportation of 1944 and the Chechen-Ingush ASSR was restored, the residents of Sharoysky District were forbidden to resettle in their ancestral homes until many years later. As a result, in 1964, Novy Sharoy was founded for former residents of the village of Sharoy who could not return.

== Population ==
- 1990 Census: 1,425
- 2002 Census: 1,739
- 2010 Census: 1,924
- 2019 estimate: 2,203
- 2023 Census: 20,678

According to the results of the 2010 Census, the majority of residents of Novy Sharoy were ethnic Chechens.

== Education ==
The village hosts one secondary school, the Novosharoyevsky Municipal Secondary School.

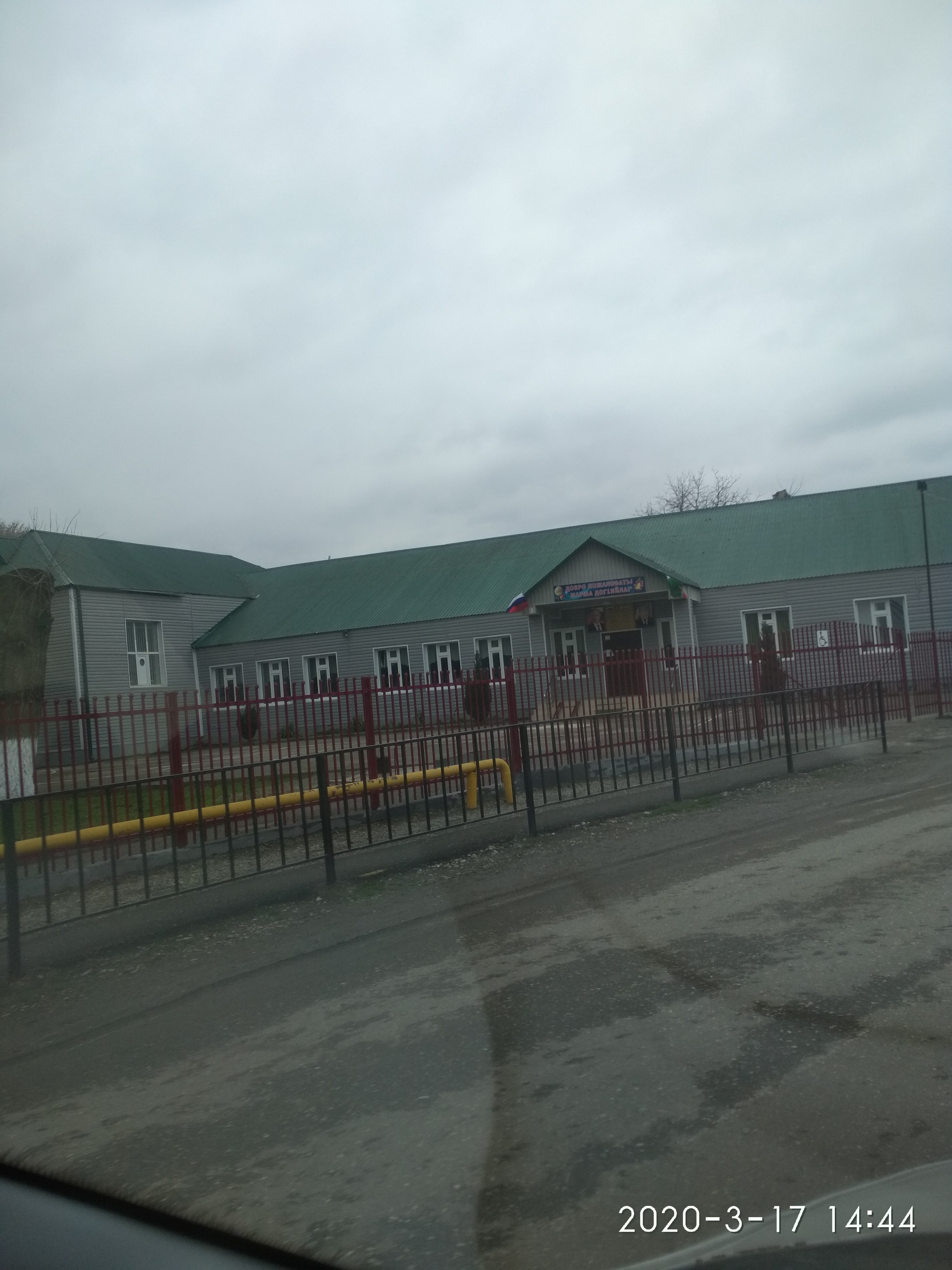
High school

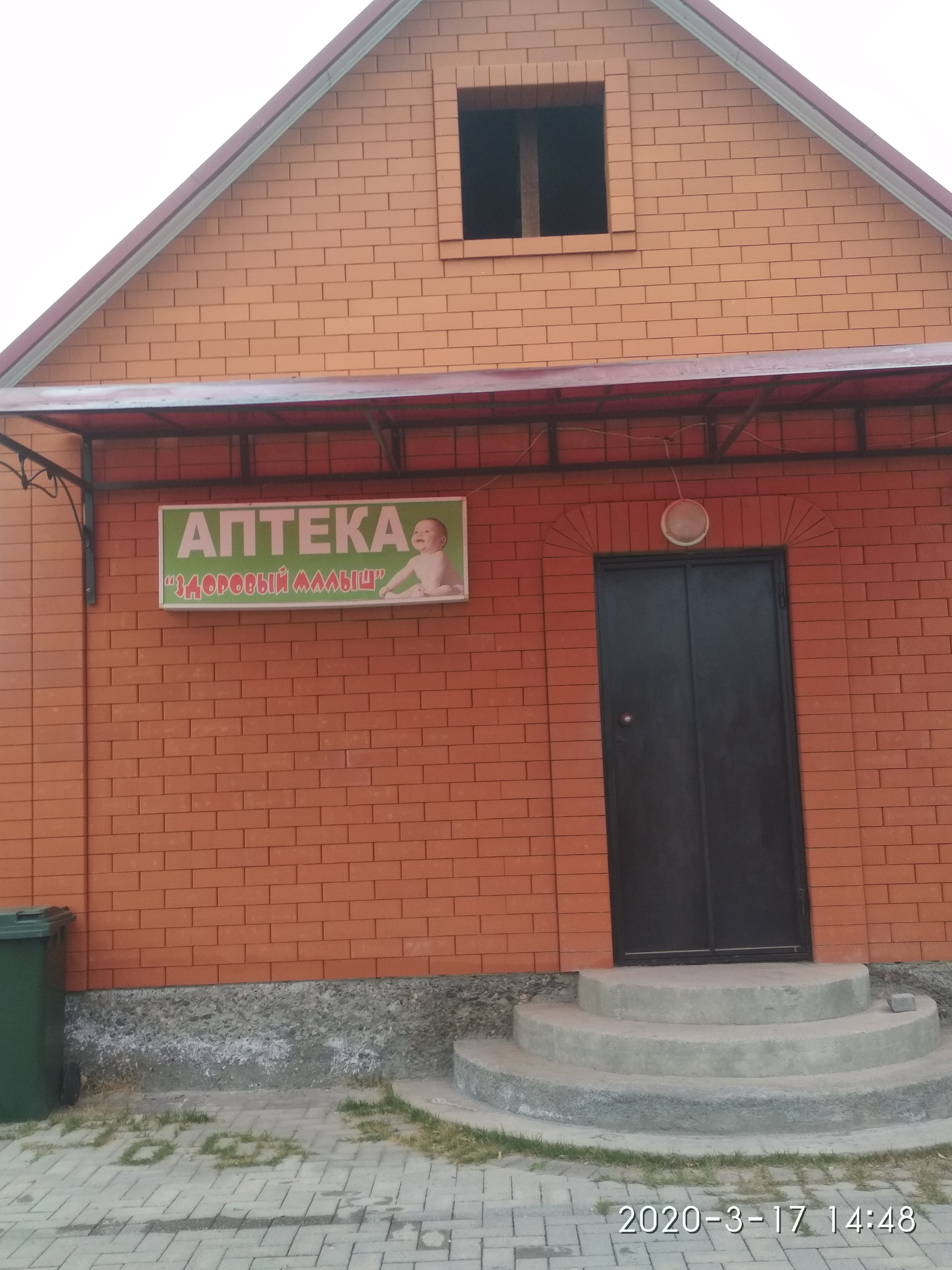
Pharmacy
