= Kulary =

Rural locality in Groznensky District, Russia

Coordinates: 43°14′13″N 45°30′03″E

Kulary (Russian: Кулары, Chechen: ГӀулара, Ġulara) is a rural locality (a selo) in Achkhoy-Martanovsky District, Chechnya.

== Administrative and municipal status ==
Municipally, Kulary is incorporated as Kularinskoye rural settlement. It is the administrative center of the municipality and is the only settlement included in it.

== Geography ==
Map of Achkhoy-Martanovsky District with Kulary highlighted

Kulary is located on the right bank of the Sunzha River, just before its confluence with the Gekhi River. It is 18 kilometres (11 mi) north-east of the town of Achkhoy-Martan and 26 kilometres (16 mi) south-west of the city of Grozny.

The nearest settlements to Kulary are Zakan-Yurt in the north-west, Alkhan-Kala in the north-east, Alkhan-Yurt in the east, the city of Urus-Martan in the south-east, Gekhi in the south, Valerik in the south-west, and Khambi-Irze in the west.

== History ==
In 1944, after the genocide and deportation of the Chechen and Ingush people and the Chechen-Ingush ASSR was abolished, the village of Kulara was renamed to Naberezhnoye, and was settled by people from other ethnic groups. From 1944 to 1957, it was a part of Grozny Oblast.

In 1957, when the Vaynakh people returned and the Chechen-Ingush ASSR was restored, the village regained its old name, Kulara.

On 1 January 2020, the village of Kulary, as well as the entire territory of the rural settlement, was transferred from Groznensky District to Achkhoy-Martanovsky District.

== Population ==
- 1990 Census: 3,365
- 2002 Census: 4,663
- 2010 Census: 5,358
- 2020 estimate: 5,960

According to the results of the 2010 Census, the majority of residents of Kulary (5,354 or 99,90%) were ethnic Chechens.

== Education ==
The village of Kulary hosts one secondary school.
