= Stary Achkhoy =

Village in Achkhoy-Martanovsky District, Russia

Coordinates: 43°07′50″N 45°17′51″E

Stary Achkhoy (Russian: Старый Ачхой, Chechen: Ӏашхой-КӀотар, Jaşxoy-Khotar) is a rural locality (a selo) in Achkhoy-Martanovsky District, Chechnya.

== Administrative and municipal status ==
Municipally, Stary Achkhoy is incorporated as Staro-Achkhoyskoye rural settlement. It is the administrative center of the municipality and is the only settlement included in it.

== Geography ==
Map of Achkhoy-Martanovsky District with Stary Achkhoy highlighted

Stary Achkhoy is located on both banks of the Achkhu River. It is located 9 kilometres (5.6 mi) south-east of the town of Achkhoy-Martan and 44 kilometres (27 mi) south-west of the city of Grozny.

The nearest settlements to Stary Achkhoy are Bamut in the west, Achkhoy-Martan in the north-west, Katyr-Yurt in the north-east, and Yandi in the east.

== History ==
In 1944, after the genocide and deportation of the Chechen and Ingush people and the Chechen-Ingush ASSR was abolished, the village of Stary Achkhoy was renamed to Kizilovo, and settled by people from other ethnic groups. From 1944 to 1957, it was a part of the Novoselsky District of Grozny Oblast.

In 1957, when the Vaynakh people returned and the Chechen-Ingush ASSR was restored, the village regained its old name, Stary Achkhoy.

== Population ==
- 1990 Census: 658
- 2002 Census: 911
- 2010 Census: 940
- 2019 estimate: 870

According to the results of the 2010 Census, the majority of residents of Stary Achkhoy were ethnic Chechens.
