= Davydenko, Achkhoy-Martanovsky District =

Rural locality in Chechnya, Russia

Coordinates: 43°16′17″N 45°15′54″E

Davydenko (Russian: Давыденко, Chechen: Шовдана-Юрт, Şovdana-Yurt) is a rural locality (a selo) in Achkhoy-Martanovsky District, Chechnya.

== Administrative and municipal status ==
Municipally, Davydenko is incorporated as Davydenkovskoye rural settlement. It is the administrative center of the municipality and the only settlement included in it.

== Geography ==
Map of Achkhoy-Martanovsky District with Davydenko highlighted

Davydenko is located on the right bank of the Sunzha River. It is located 9 kilometres (5.6 mi) north of the town of Achkhoy-Martan.

The nearest settlements to Davydenko are Novy Sharoy in the south, Assinovskaya in the south-west, Sernovodskoye in the north-west, and Samashki in the north-east.

== History ==
Davydenkov Farm was founded in 1880 by immigrants from Ukraine, who purchased the land. However, there is evidence that Davydenko was actually founded in 1886. As of January 1, 1883, among the Cossack settlements of the 5th section of the Grozny District, it was absent from the list of settlements of the Terek Oblast. According to data from the end of 1889, a location called Davydenkova farm was present on the list, as a part of the Samashki rural settlement.

By mid 1914, Davydenkova farm had about 200 acres of land (22 of them covered with forest). In 31 households, 179 people lived (96 men and 83 women).

According to the list of populated places of the North Caucasus in 1925, Davydenko had 366 residents (174 men and 192 women), as well as a pond and an elementary school, among other things.

In 1944, after the genocide and deportation of the Chechen and Ingush people and the Chechen-Ingush ASSR was abolished, the village of Davydenko was renamed and settled by people from other ethnic groups. From 1944 to 1957, it was a part of the Novoselsky District of Grozny Oblast.

In 1958, after the Vaynakh people returned and the Chechen-Ingush ASSR was restored, the village regained its old name, Davydenko.

== Population ==
- 1984 estimate: around 1,000
- 1990 Census: 1,106
- 2002 Census: 1,529
- 2010 Census: 1,702
- 2019 estimate: 1,890

According to the results of the 2002 Census, 1,529 people lived in Davydenko (710 men and 819 women). 98% of the population were ethnic Chechens.

According to the results of the 2010 Census, the majority of residents of Davydenko (1,690 or 99.3%) were ethnic Chechens. Of the remaining 12 people - 10 of them were Russians, the last 2 did not specify their ethnic background.

== Infrastructure ==
Davydenko hosts a secondary school, a paramedic-midwife station, a House of Culture, a library, a mosque, and several farms which grow produce such as grapes and wheat.
