= Helicopter Brigade of Russian Airborne Troops =

Russian plan to create aviation brigade

The helicopter brigade of Russian Airborne Forces is a plan of the Ministry of Defense of Russia to create a brigade of army aviation as part of the Airborne Forces.

== Story ==
In December 2012, the commander of the airborne troops, Colonel-General Vladimir Shamanov, offered to include army aviation in the composition of the brigade of the Airborne Forces as an experiment.

“We want to propose to include a helicopter regiment in the 31st separate airborne assault brigade: 40 Mi-8 helicopters and 20 Mi-24 helicopters. I emphasize that they are part of the brigade ... It’s difficult to meet us or the General Staff. Over the past 2 years, almost all of our applications for the allocation of army aviation have been met, "said Shamanov at a press conference in Moscow.

== Cause ==
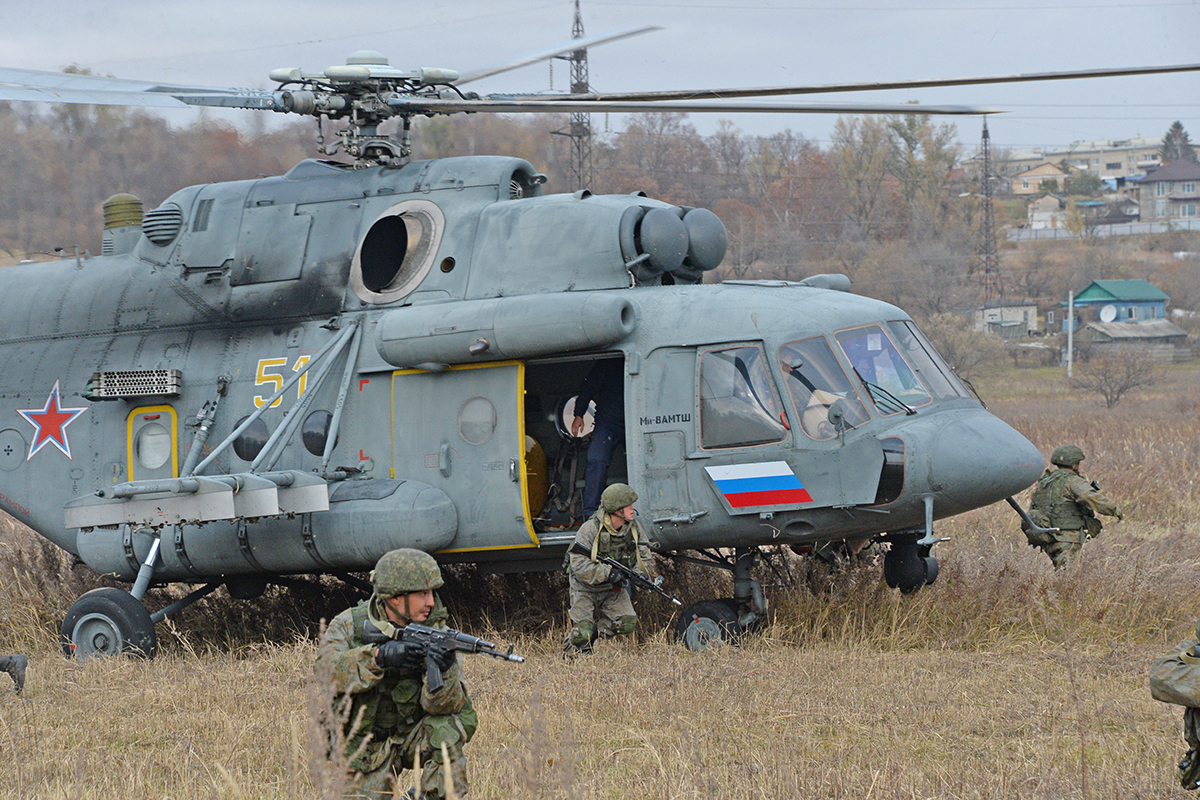
The landing of the landing from the helicopter Mi-8AMTSH

Currently, army aviation brigades are organizationally part of the Aerospace Forces. At the same time, they are operatively subordinated to the command of military districts.

In this regard, the commander of the Airborne Forces in order to plan the transfer of units, you must go through a lot of approvals at the level of higher headquarters. Therefore, precious time is lost. In addition, a large number of participants in such negotiations may lead to information leaks. This negates the key factor of the Airborne Forces - surprise.

Another reason: in the conditions of powerful air defense, the most effective is the transfer of troops by helicopter, which is almost imperceptible at ultra-low altitudes. In addition, a helicopter for paratroopers is not only a means of delivery, but also fire support.

That is why it was decided to form its own aircraft in the Airborne Forces - airborne units will be able to use their helicopters without unnecessary delay.

== Formation ==
The Ministry of Defense of Russia noted that the proposal to form one air force brigade in the Airborne Forces as a whole was approved. A new brigade is planned to be formed in the next 2-3 years.

For the brigade it is necessary to order new helicopters. According to Izvestia sources, the helicopter brigade will report directly to the commander of the Airborne Forces.

== The composition of the brigade ==
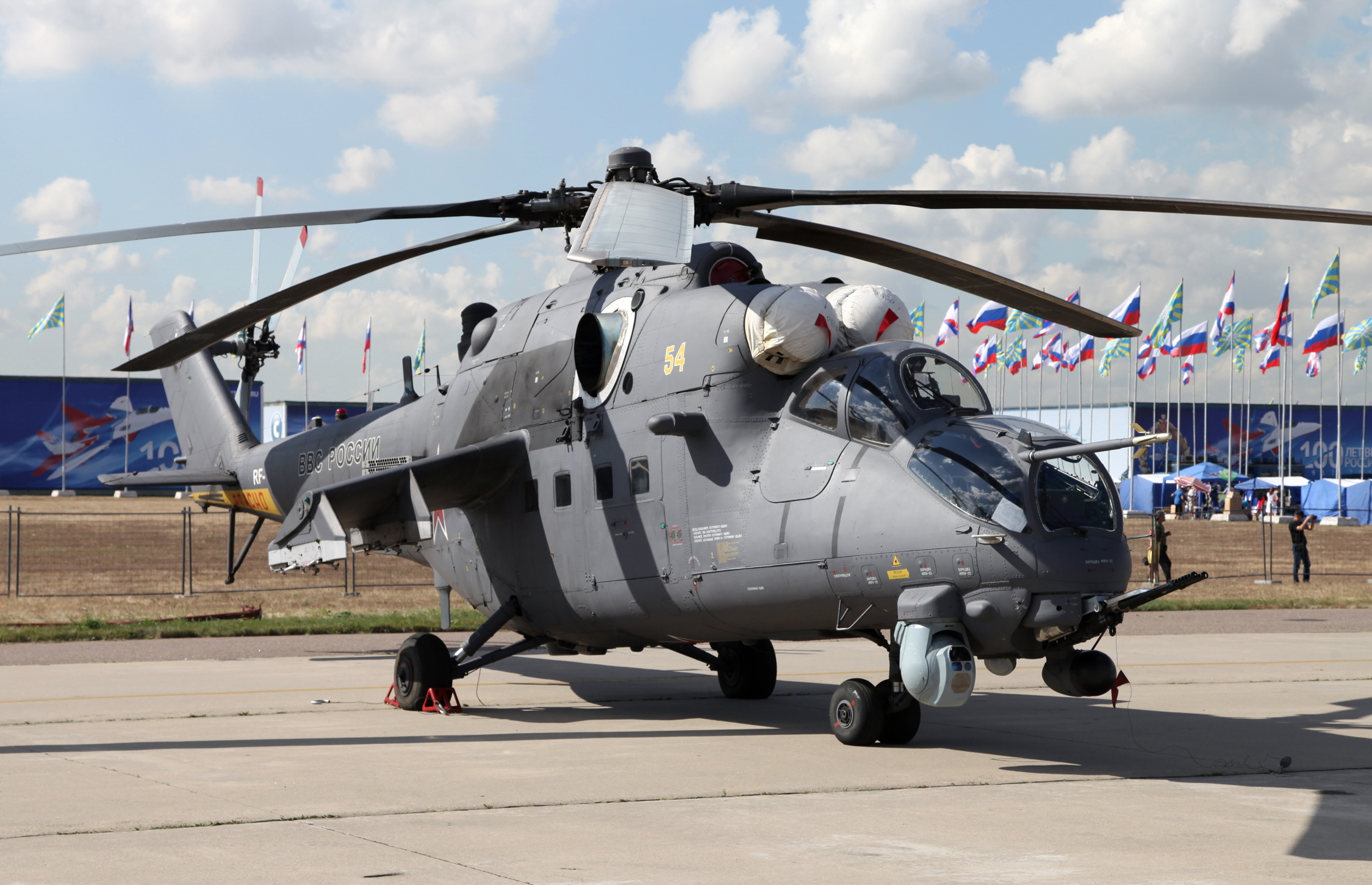
Mi-35M

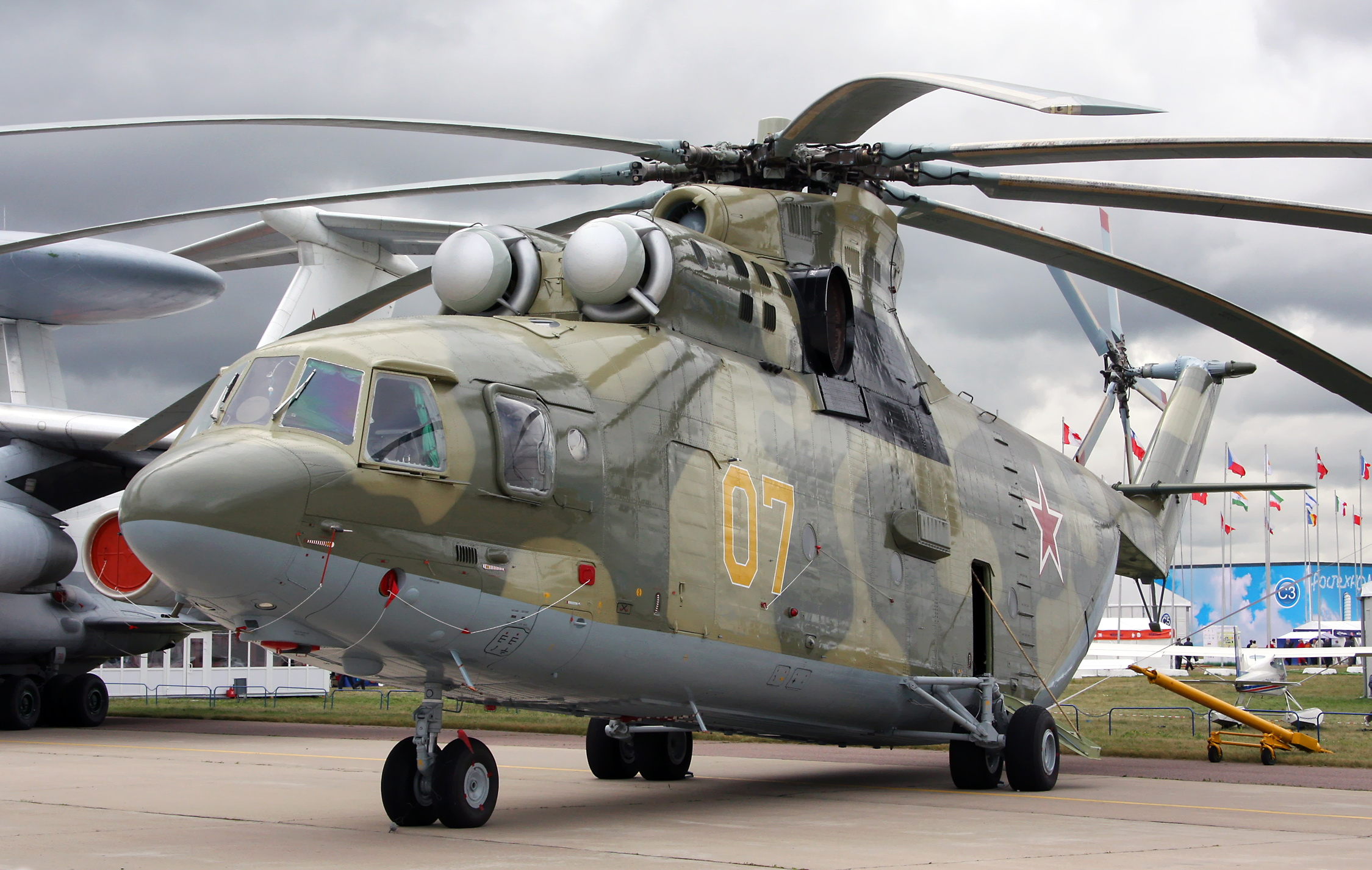
Mi-26

The brigade will consist of 4 helicopter squadrons. The total number is 48–50 helicopters.

One squadron will be equipped with Mi-35M “Super Crocodile” drums - this model, unlike the main attack helicopters Mi-28N and Ka-52, can carry up to seven people of the assault force. Two squadrons will receive in service the transport and combat Mi-8AMTSH-V. Fourth - super heavy Mi-26T2 helicopters.

== Dislocation ==
The brigade will be based either in Ryazan, Voronezh or Orenburg.
