= Adamishin =

Adamishin (Russian: Адами́шин; masculine) or Adamishina (Адами́шина; feminine) is a Slavic surname derived from the given name Adam.

People with the last name

- Anatoly Adamishin (1934–2025), Russian diplomat, politician, and businessman
- Viktor Adamishin (1962–1995), Russian militia captain and Hero of the Russian Federation
