= Yandi =

Yandi may refer to:

- Yandi, Achkhoy-Martanovsky District, a rural locality in Chechnya
- Yan Emperor, aka Yán Dì, ancient Chinese ruler
- Yandi Munawar (born 1992), Indonesian footballer
- Yandi mine, iron ore mine in Western Australia
- Yandicoogina mine, iron ore mine in Western Australia
- Yandhi, announced 2019 album by Kanye West
