= Yandi, Achkhoy-Martanovsky District =

Village in Achkhoy-Martanovsky District, Russia

Coordinates: 43°07′41″N 45°19′44″E

Yandi (Russian: Янди, Chechen: Янди-КӀотар, Yandi-Khotar) is a rural locality (a selo) in Achkhoy-Martanovsky District, Chechnya.

== Administrative and municipal status ==
Municipally, Yandi is incorporated as Yandinskoye rural settlement. It is the administrative center of the municipality and is the only settlement included in it.

== Geography ==
Map of Achkhoy-Martanovsky District with Yandi highlighted

Yandi is located on the right bank of the Netkhoy River. It is located 11 kilometres (6.8 mi) south-east of the town of Achkhoy-Martan and 40 kilometres (25 mi) south-west of the city of Grozny.

The nearest settlements to Yandi are Katyr-Yurt and Valerik in the north-east, Gekhi in the east, Shalazhi in the south-east, and Stary Achkhoy in the west.

== History ==
In 1944, after the genocide and deportation of the Chechen and Ingush people and the Chechen-Ingush ASSR was abolished, the village of Yandi was renamed to Orekhovo, and settled by people from other ethnic groups. From 1944 to 1957, it was a part of the Novoselsky District of Grozny Oblast.

In 1957, when the Vaynakh people returned and the Chechen-Ingush ASSR was restored, the village regained its old name, Yandi.

== Population ==
- 1990 Census: 2,339
- 2002 Census: 1,510
- 2010 Census: 2,488
- 2019 estimate: 2,618

According to the results of the 2010 Census, the majority of residents of Yandi were ethnic Chechens.
