= Zakan-Yurt =

Village in Achkhoy-Martanovsky District, Russia

Coordinates: 43°15′49″N 45°25′09″E

Zakan-Yurt (Russian: Закан-Юрт, Chechen: Заки-Эвла, Zaki-Evla) is a rural locality (a selo) in Achkhoy-Martanovsky District, Chechnya.

== Administrative and municipal status ==
Municipally, Zakan-Yurt is incorporated as Zakan-Yurtovskoye rural settlement. It is the administrative center of the municipality and is the only settlement included in it.

== Geography ==
Map of Achkhoy-Martanovsky District with Zakan-Yurt highlighted

Zakan-Yurt is located on the southern slope of the Sunzhensky Ridge, opposite from the confluence of the Assa River into the Sunzha River. It is located 18 kilometres (11 mi) north-east of the town of Achkhoy-Martan and 23 kilometres (14 mi) south-west of the city of Grozny.

The nearest settlements to Zakan-Yurt are Alkhan-Kala in the east, Khambi-Irze in the south-east, Shaami-Yurt in the south-west, and Samashki in the north-west.

== History ==
The village was first founded in 1851 or 1853, according to different sources, with the name of Zakan-Yurtovskaya (from 1913-1924 - called Romanovskaya) as a part of the Sunzhensky Cossack line. Later, on Order number 01721, the entire Cossack population of the village was evicted. The empty village was then handed to Chechen control. It was populated by Chechens and renamed to Zakan-Yurt at this time.

In 1944, after the genocide and deportation of the Chechen and Ingush people and the Chechen-Ingush ASSR was abolished, the village of Zakan-Yurt was renamed to Prigorodnoye, and settled by people from other ethnic groups. From 1944 to 1957, it was a part of the Novoselsky District of Grozny Oblast.

In 1958, after the Vaynakh people returned and the Chechen-Ingush ASSR was restored, the village regained its old name, Zaki-Evla.

On 1 January 2020, the territory of the Samashki Forestry was transferred from Samashki to Zakan-Yurt, and became known as Zakan-Yurt Forestry.

== Population ==
- 1990 Census: 5,093
- 2002 Census: 4,928
- 2010 Census: 5,835
- 2019 estimate: 6,713

According to the results of the 2010 Census, the majority of residents of Zakan-Yurt were ethnic Chechens.

== Infrastructure ==
Zakan-Yurt hosts two secondary schools, a kindergarten, and a state farm.
