= Vladimir Shamanov =

Russian former colonel general and politician

Vladimir Shamanov MP
- Владимир Шаманов
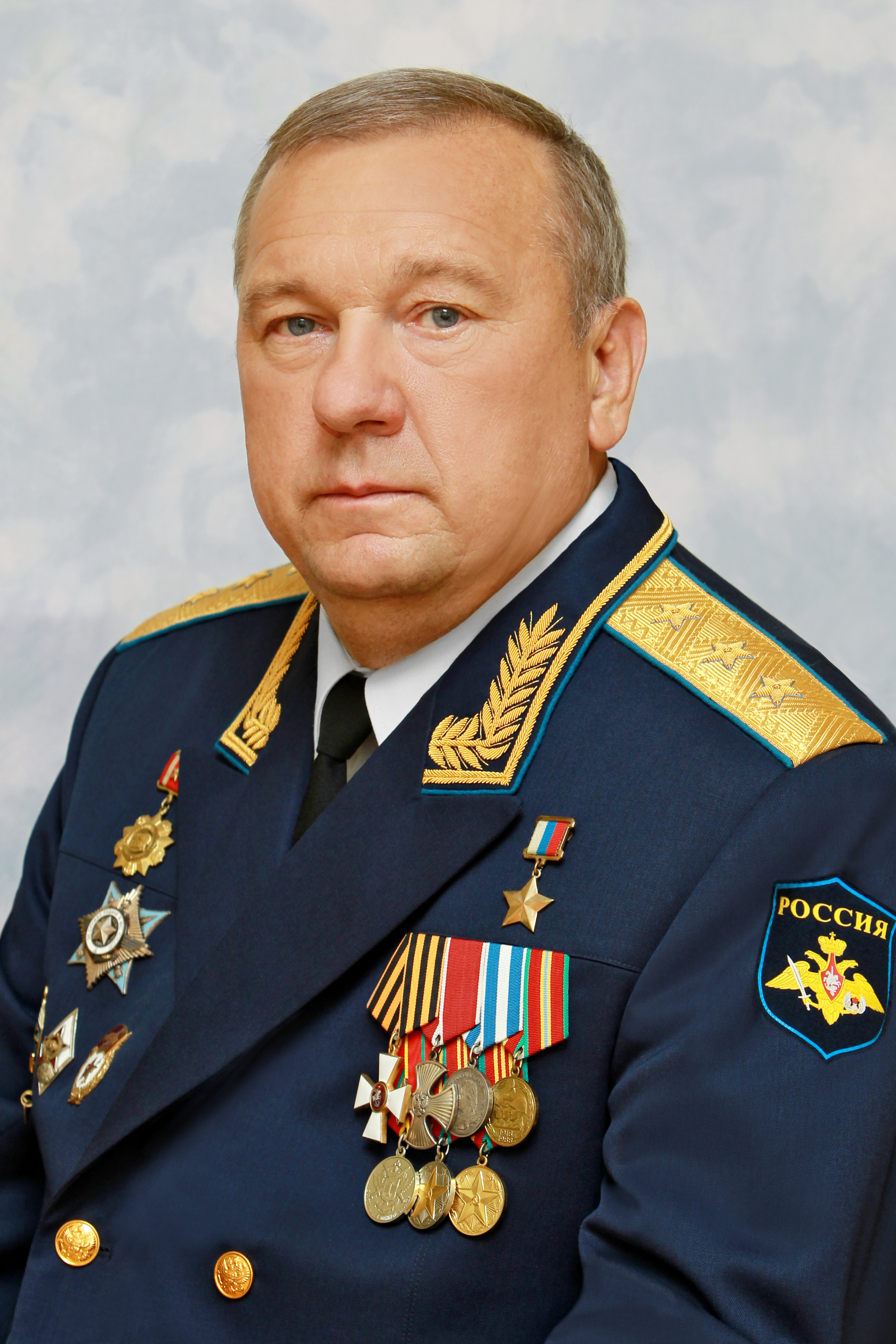
- Official portrait, 2010

Member of the State Duma
- Incumbent
- Assumed office 5 October 2016
- Constituency: Party list

Chairman of the Defence Committee of the State Duma
- In office 5 October 2016 – 12 October 2021
- Preceded by: Vladimir Komoyedov
- Succeeded by: Andrey Kartapolov

2nd Governor of Ulyanovsk Oblast
- In office 19 January 2001 – 15 November 2004
- Preceded by: Yury Goryachev
- Succeeded by: Maria Bolshakova (acting); Sergey Morozov

Personal details
- Born: 15 February 1957 (age 69) Barnaul, Altai Krai, Russian SFSR, Soviet Union
- Party: United Russia
- Spouse: Lyudmila Shamanova
- Education: Tashkent Higher Tank Command School; Frunze Military Academy; General Staff Academy
- Awards: Hero of Russian Federation
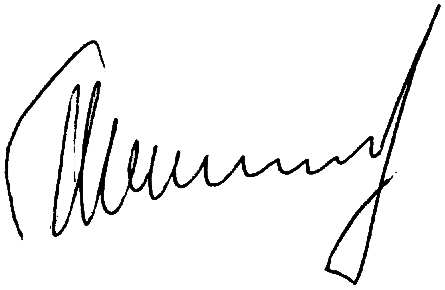
- Signature

Military service
- Allegiance: Soviet Union (to 1991); Russia
- Branch/service: Soviet Airborne Forces; Russian Airborne Forces
- Years of service: 1978–2016
- Rank: Colonel General
- Commands: 328th Guards Parachute Regiment; 58th Army; Russian Airborne Forces
- Battles/wars: First Nagorno-Karabakh War; Operation Goranboy; First Chechen War; First Battle of Grozny; Battle of Bamut; Dagestan War; Second Chechen War; Battle of Grozny; Russo-Georgian War; Battle of Kodori Valley

Vladimir Anatolyevich Shamanov (Russian: Владимир Анатольевич Шаманов, born 15 February 1957) is a Russian politician and retired colonel general who last served as the commander of the Russian Airborne Forces from May 2009 to October 2016. Since he was elected in the 2016 Russian legislative election, Shamanov has been member of the State Duma, and he was the head of the Defense Committee until 2021.

== Biography ==
Vladimir Shamanov entered the Tashkent Higher Tank Command School in 1974. He commanded a battalion in the 76th Guards Air Assault Division in 1985–86, attended the Frunze Academy, graduated in 1989, was a deputy airborne regiment commander in Moldova, regimental commander in Azerbaijan, became division chief of staff for 7th Guards Airborne Division in Novorossiysk, fought in the Chechen War, and became there the senior commander for the Ground Forces there in April 1996.

He received the Hero of the Russian Federation decoration for his service in Chechnya, but human-rights groups have criticized him strongly for war crimes committed by Russian Federation troops under his orders during the First Chechen War of 1994–1996 and the Second Chechen War of 1999–2009. Shamanov was removed from duty in January 2000 for "health reasons", and for a period he served as a civilian politician, becoming the elected governor (2001–2004) of the Ulyanovsk Oblast region of the Russian Federation.

As of 2007 Shamanov operated as a counselor to Russia's defense minister, Sergei Ivanov, and as co-chairman of the U.S - Russia Joint Commission on POW/MIAs (USRJC) which seeks to determine the fates of U.S. personnel who remain unaccounted-for from World War II and from the Cold War Era. In November 2007 Kommersant reported his impending return to the Ministry of Defence.

In August 2008 Shamanov commanded the Russian forces in Abkhazia during the 2008 South Ossetia war against Georgia. On August 12, 2008, he took control over 9,600 Russian servicemen in Abkhazia and led them during the fight with Georgian forces for control over the Upper Kodori Gorge.

On 26 May 2009 Vladimir Shamanov became the new commander of the VDV, replacing Lieutenant General Valery Yevtukhovich after Yevtukhovich reached the age of 55 and was discharged to the reserve. Dmitry Medvedev appointed Shamanov to neutralize discontent over the cuts and reorganisations as a result of the 2008 reform programme. Although Shamanov supported the programme, he cancelled all cuts and changes in the VDV and announced reinforcement for the airborne troops.

On 4 October 2016 Shamanov retired from the Russian Armed Forces and became head of the State Duma Defence Committee.

=== Sanctions ===
He was sanctioned by the UK government in 2014 in relation to the Russo-Ukrainian War.

== Controversies ==
Shamanov has an image of an "over-the-top" ruthless man among the other Russian military leaders, with certain insurgency-related sources calling him the "Butcher of Chechnya". Already during the First Chechen War, the Chechen Insurgency claimed Shamanov to be the reincarnation of Alexey Yermolov, alluding to the Russian Imperial general of the 19th century Caucasian War, who was famous in his time for his merciless policy towards the local rebel fighters and their supporters among civilians.

As Gennady Troshev, another Russian commander in Chechnya, wrote in his book My War, Shamanov "was too hot-tempered and direct in his relations with the Chechen population" [preferring] "to choose the shortest way to victory (...) [which] resulted in numerous casualties among Russian soldiers."

Aslambek Aslakhanov, a retired MVD general who was Vladimir Putin's advisor on Chechnya, called Shamanov a "butcher" and a "one-man curse on the Chechen people": "Chechens talk about Shamanov like a plague that has descended on their heads, a disease like AIDS. He is drowning in blood. He cynically believes that all Chechens – men and women, even children – are bandits."

The director of the Moscow office of Memorial, the human rights group founded by the late Nobel Peace Prize laureate Andrei Sakharov, said: "His subordinates are definitely guilty of war crimes, and I believe a serious investigation would show Shamanov’s direct guilt in war crimes as well, that he ordered them. He has a serious xenophobic streak. He’s cruel, but it comes from his sense of duty. He’s honest about it, but that doesn’t make it less frightening."

In December 1999 Shamanov was awarded his second Hero of the Russian Federation medal for actions around the village of Alkhan-Yurt earlier that month. However, Human Rights Watch (HRW) have asked the Russian government to open an investigation into his role the incident in Chechnya, which HRW has declared a "massacre." Shamanov was reported as threatening to shoot villagers who pleaded with him to halt the abuses. Later, he dismissed calls for accountability for the abuses, saying that the Russian soldiers were doing "a sacred thing". In a Novaya Gazeta interview published in June 2000, Shamanov eventually admitted there have been numerous cases of looting by the Russian military in Chechnya, but he also said he viewed his image as a "cruel general" as a compliment and that he believed the wives and children of rebel fighters to also be "bandits" who needed to be "destroyed". Nevertheless, he denied the accusations of human rights violations in the foreign media. In the 2004 The Washington Post interview, Shamanov rejected the allegations as "fairy tales" and suggested that human rights groups had planted the bodies in Alkhan-Yurt and "fabricated" a slaughter.

Shamanov's forces are also believed to have looted and pillaged and killed in the other places during the second Chechen campaign, among them at Katyr-Yurt (in 2005 the European Court of Human Rights held Russia responsible for civilian deaths during the indiscriminate bombing of Katyr-Yurt), Shami-Yurt and Gekhi-Chu.

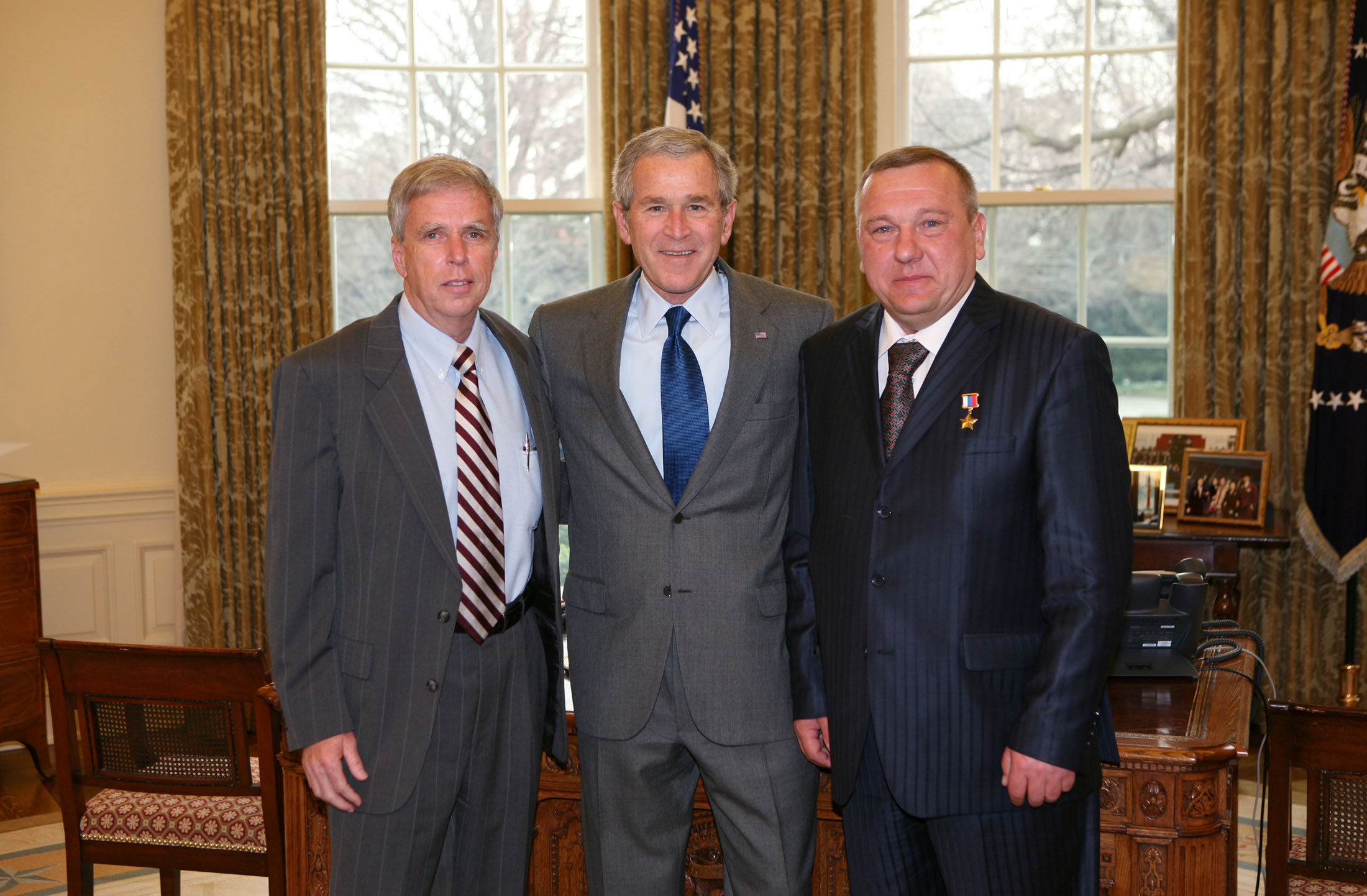
Controversial image of Robert H. Foglesong, U.S. President George W. Bush, and Vladimir Shamanov in the Oval Office.

In March 2000, Shamanov exhibited strong sympathy towards the war crimes suspect Colonel Yuri Budanov. Budanov, Shamanov trumpeted, was one of his "best commanders" and offered this challenge: "Don't put your paws on the image of a Russian soldier and officer." Later, Shamanov came to Rostov-on-the-Don to defend Budanov during trial and expressed his solidarity with him. Ultimately, Budanov was convicted for the March 2000 kidnapping and murder of the young Chechen woman Elza Kungaeva. On September 21, 2004, Shamanov, now the Ulyanovsk regional governor, backed a pardon for Budanov, sparking anger in Chechnya even among the pro-Moscow locals.

In March 2007 Shamanov met in the White House with the U.S. President George W. Bush, which was criticised by human rights groups. "This isn't someone the U.S. president should be meeting with. This is someone the president should be calling for an investigation of," HRW commented. Later, the White House explained that it was not aware of the allegations against the general before their meeting and that it is "unlikely" that Bush would have meet and pose to photo with Shamanov if he had been aware of the allegations.

In September 2010, MOD Serdyukov helped Shamanov out of a scandal when he tried to order a detachment from the VDV's 45th Independent Reconnaissance Regiment to detain an investigator looking into the business of his son-in-law Anatoly "Glyba" Khramushin, a well-known criminal figure. Shamanov had to admit to "inappropriate behaviour" and only got a reprimand for this incident. He could easily have been dismissed.

== Car crash ==
On October 30, 2010, in Tula, general Shamanov's BMW 525 was hit by a MAZ truck. The general's driver was killed on impact, while he and two passengers (Shamanov's assistant Colonel Oleg Chernousand and Colonel Alexey Naumets, the acting commander of the 106th Airborne Division) were seriously injured and hospitalized. Vladimir Shamanov had a brain concussion and had his arm broken. The same evening the general was visited by Vladimir Putin at the Burdenko Main Military Clinical Hospital in Moscow. General Shamanov was discharged from the hospital on 27 December 2010.

== Honours and awards ==
- Hero of the Russian Federation (Presidential Decree of 4 December 1999) - for the fighting in Dagestan in August - September 1999
- Order of Saint George, 4th class (No. 006, 2008)
- Order of Courage
- Order for Service to the Homeland in the Armed Forces of the USSR, 3rd class
- Medal "200 Years of the Ministry of Defense"
- Medal "For Distinction in Military Service" 1st and 2nd class
- Jubilee Medal "300 Years of the Russian Navy"
- Jubilee Medal "70 Years of the Armed Forces of the USSR"
- Medals "For Impeccable Service" 3rd and 2nd classes
- Medal "In Commemoration of the 850th Anniversary of Moscow"

== See also ==
- List of Heroes of the Russian Federation

Political offices
Preceded by Vladimir Komoedov	Chairman of the Defense Committee of the State Duma; 2016–2021	Succeeded by Andrey Kartapolov
Preceded by Yury Goryachev	Governor of Ulyanovsk Oblast; 2001–2004	Succeeded by Sergey Ivanovich Morozov
