= Viktor Adamishin =

Russian militia captain

Viktor Mikhailovich Adamishin
- Виктор Михайлович Адамишин
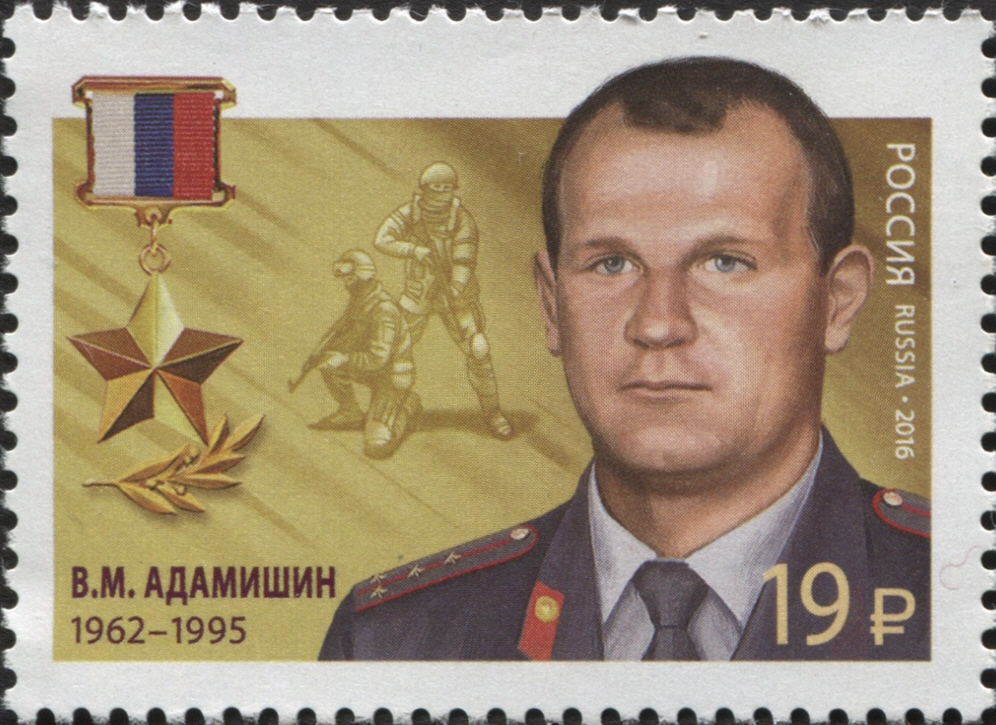
- Born: 25 March 1962; Murmansk, Russian SFSR, Soviet Union
- Died: 7 April 1995 (aged 33); Samashki, Chechenya, Russia
- Military career
- Allegiance: Soviet Union; Russia
- Branch: MVD
- Service years: 1980–1982; 1984–1995
- Rank: Captain
- Conflicts: First Chechen War
- Awards: Hero of the Russian Federation

Viktor Mikhailovich Adamishin (Russian: Виктор Михайлович Адамишин; 25 March 1962 – 7 April 1995) was a Russian militia captain. In 1995 he was killed during a military operation in the Chechen village of Samashki, and was awarded posthumously the title Hero of the Russian Federation on August 25, 1995.

During a military operation in Samashki, Adamishin's unit was surrounded by militants and pinned down by heavy fire. During the fighting, Adamishin's squad became surrounded and formed a defensive circle. Viktor decided to organize a breakthrough for his unit and remained behind to provide covering fire. Adamishin was mortally wounded during the skirmish and died on the battlefield.

Adamishin was posthumously awarded the Russian Order of Courage in 1995.

== See also ==
- List of Heroes of the Russian Federation
