= Katyr-Yurt =

Village in western Chechnya, Russia

Coordinates: 43°10′07″N 45°22′05″E

Katyr-Yurt (Russian: Катыр-Юрт or Катар-Юрт, Chechen: Котар-Йурт, Kotar-Yurt) is a rural locality (a selo) in Achkhoy-Martanovsky District, Chechnya.

== Administrative and municipal status ==
Municipally, Katyr-Yurt is incorporated as Katyr-Yurtovskoye rural settlement. It is the administrative center of the municipality and is the only settlement included in it.

== Geography ==
Map of Achkhoy-Martanovsky District with Kotar-Yurt highlighted

Katyr-Yurt is located between the Netkhoy and Shalazha rivers. It is located 3 kilometres (1.9 mi) south-east of the town of Achkhoy-Martan and 30 kilometres (19 mi) south-west of the city of Grozny.

The nearest settlements to Katyr-Yurt are Shaami-Yurt and Valerik in the north-east, Gekhi in the east, Gekhi-Chu in the south-east, Shalazhi in the south, Yandi in the south-west, Bamut in the west, and Achkhoy-Martan in the north-west.

== History ==
In 1944, after the genocide and deportation of the Chechen and Ingush people and the Chechen-Ingush ASSR was abolished, the village of Katyr-Yurt was renamed to Tutovo, and settled by people from other ethnic groups. From 1944 to 1957, it was a part of the Novoselsky District of Grozny Oblast.

In 1958, after the Vaynakh people returned and the Chechen-Ingush ASSR was restored, the village regained its old name, Katyr-Yurt.

== Katyr-Yurt in the Chechen Wars ==
From 4 February 2000 to 7 February 2000, during the closing stages of the Second Chechen War, Russian aircraft launched several bomb attacks against the village of Katyr-Yurt. While the intended target was said to be militants who were passing through the village, the vast majority of the victims were civilians. At least 363 civilians were killed in the attack. On 2 December 2010, the European Court of Human Rights ordered Russia to pay €1,720,000 to the victims of the bomb attack on Katyr-Yurt, in compensation to 29 applicants for their injuries or the death of their loved ones.

== Population ==
- 1979 Census: 6,120
- 1990 Census: 7,562
- 2002 Census: 9,182
- 2010 Census: 12,806
- 2019 estimate: 14,556
- 2022 estimate: 34,861

According to the results of the 2010 Census, the majority of residents of Katyr-Yurt were ethnic Chechens.
