= Samashki =

Locality in Achkhoy-Martanovsky District, Chechnya, Russia

Samashki Самашки

Other transcription(s)
  - Chechen: СемаӀашка
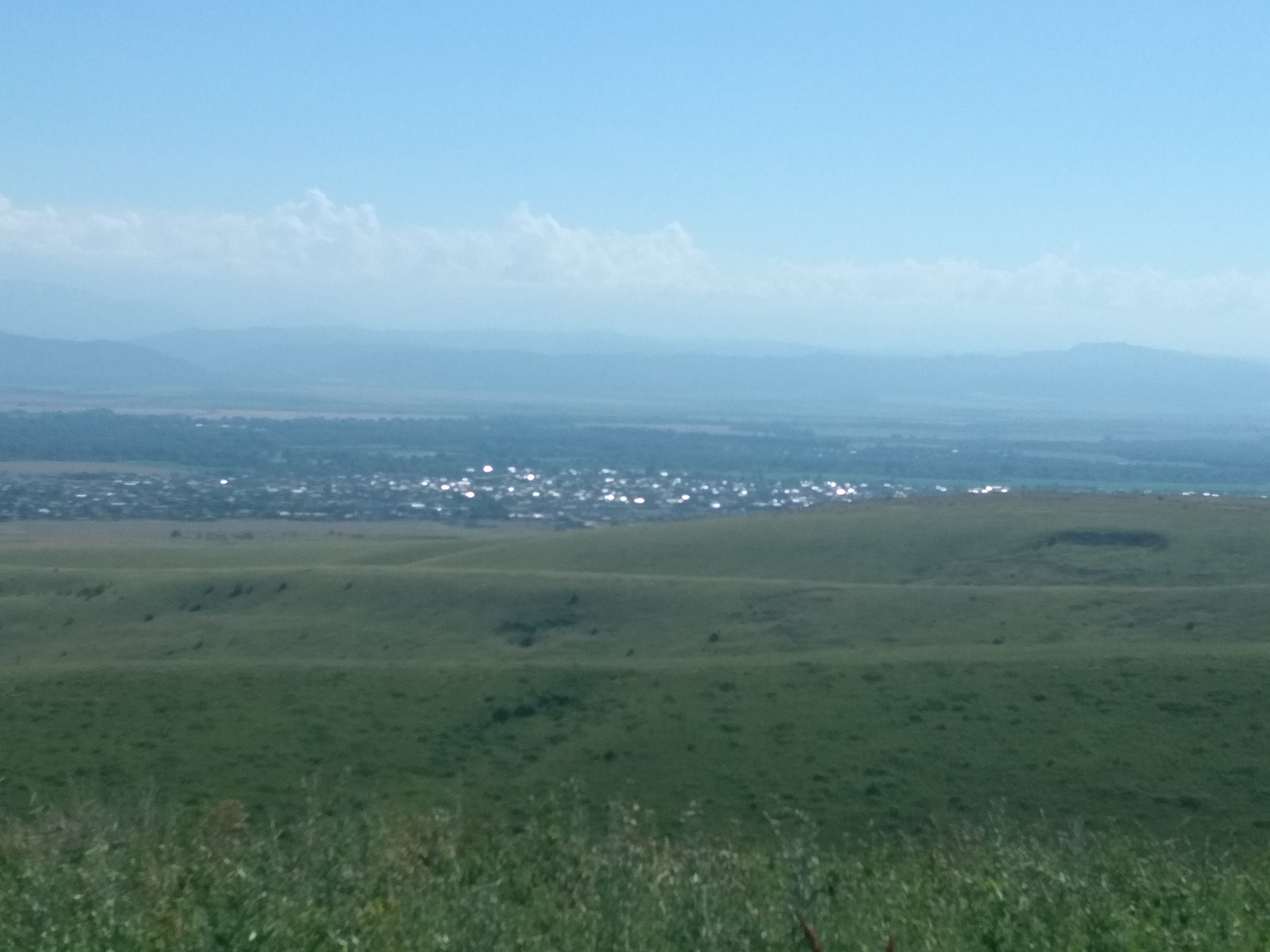
- Interactive map of Samashki
- Location of Samashki Samashki (Chechnya)
- Coordinates: 43°17′32″N 45°18′14″E
- Country: Russia
- Federal subject: Chechnya
- Founded: 1851
- Elevation: 235 m (771 ft)

Population
  - Estimate (2025): 12,769 )

Municipal status
  - Municipal district: Achkhoy-Martanovsky District
  - Rural settlement: Samashkinskoye
- Time zone: UTC+3 (MSK)
- Postal code: 366602
- Dialing code: +7 87147
- OKTMO ID: 96602425101

Samashki (Russian: Самашки; Chechen: СемаӀашка, Semajaşka) is a rural locality (a selo) in Achkhoy-Martanovsky District, Chechnya. Samashki is the administrative center and only settlement of the Samashkinskoye rural settlement. Its population was estimated at 12,769 in 2021.

== Geography ==
Map of Achkhoy-Martanovsky District with Samashki highlighted

Samashki is located on the left bank of the Sunzha River. It is 9 kilometres (5.6 mi) north of the town of Achkhoy-Martan and 30 kilometres (19 mi) west of the city of Grozny.

From the north, the hills of the Sunzhensky ridge reach the village, and from the south, the Samashki Forestry and the Sunzha River.

The nearest settlements to Samashki are Raduzhnoye to the north-east, Zakan-Yurt to the east, Novy Sharoy to the south, Davydenko to the south-west, and Sernovodskoye to the west.

== Name ==
The name of the village comes from the Chechen: Саь-Маӏашка, which translates roughly as "the place of deers".

== History ==
Samashki was founded in 1851, as a part of the Sunzhensky Cossack line, on the site of the destroyed Chechen village of Lower Samashki. In 1920, the entire Cossack population of the village was evicted by order of Sergo Ordzhonikidze. The village was then given back to the Chechens, who repopulated it.

In 1944, after the genocide and deportation of the Chechen and Ingush people and the abolition of the Chechen-Ingush ASSR, the village of Samashki was renamed and settled by people from other ethnic groups. From 1944 to 1957, it was a part of the Novoselsky District of Grozny Oblast.

In 1958, after the Vainakh people returned and the Chechen-Ingush ASSR was restored, the village regained its old name, Samashki.

== Samashki in the Chechen Wars ==
During both Chechen Wars the village suffered greatly from the hostilities, most notably in the notorious April 1995 incident known as Samashki massacre committed by the Internal Troops of Russia which resulted in the deaths of 100 to 300 civilians.

In March 1996 another attack on the town took the form of a full-scale assault with apparent disregard for civilian lives; according to Human Rights Watch, Russian forces used civilians as a human shields on APCs. Reports suggested some 500 civilians were killed as a result of the April 1995 and March 1996 attacks. The next month, Russian journalist Nadezhda Chaikova, who had filmed the effects of the 1996 attack, was killed execution-style in Chechnya.

A devastating artillery and rocket attack on Samashki took place in October 1999 at the beginning of the Second Chechen War, despite the demilitarization of the village, killing or injuring dozens of residents on October 27, 1999 alone, according to HRW. At the time, the deputy commander of the North Caucasus Military District announced that there were only "bandits and terrorists" in Samashki, but a report for the British parliament claimed civilians were killed in revenge for the heavy casualties suffered there by Russian forces during the first war.

Federal forces reported a large-scale operation in Samashki in May 2000.

== Population ==
- 1979 Census: 9,185
- 1990 Census: 9,945
- 2002 Census: 10,824
- 2010 Census: 11,275
- 2019 estimate: 12,597
- 2021 estimate: 12,769

According to the results of the 2010 Census, the majority of residents of Samashki (11,263 or 99.9%) were ethnic Chechens, with 12 people (0.1%) coming from other ethnic backgrounds.

== Teips ==
Members of the following teips (clans) live in Samashki:

- Nashkhoy
- Zandak
- Sharoy
- Zumsoy
- Terloy
- Nuokhoy
- Galay
- Akkiy
- Keloy
- Cheberloy
- Dai
- Nizhloy
- Gukhoy
- Kesaloy
- Khimoy
- Khakmadoy
- Shikaroy
- Chanti
- Buosoy

== Famous natives ==
- Lyoma Satuyev, Honored Artist of the Chechen Republic, theater and film actor;
- Usman Dadayev, tightrope walker, People's Artist of the Chechen Republic, Honored Artist of the Republic of Ingushetia;
- Mikhail Ivanyukov, Hero of Socialist Labor;
- Prokofi Kalashnikov, Hero of the Soviet Union, colonel, tanker;
- Shumisat Khazhmukhambetova, sambo wrestler and judoka, champion of the USSR, silver medalist of the Spartakiad of the peoples of the USSR, master of sports of the USSR in sambo and judo.

== Transportation ==
The R217 federal highway "Caucasus" passes 4 kilometres (2.5 mi) south of the village. Also, a railway line from Nazran to Grozny passes through the village. Part of the village is located beyond the railway.
