= Bombing of Katyr-Yurt =

Bombing in Chechnya

- Location: Katyr-Yurt, Chechnya
- Date: February 4, 2000
- Target: Village, refugee convoy
- Attack type: Indiscriminate bombing
- Deaths: At least 363 civilians killed, more injured
- Perpetrator: Russian Air Force
- Motive: Attack on the retreating rebel forces in area.

The reported bombing of Katyr-Yurt (Chechnya) occurred on February 4, 2000, when Russian forces bombed the village of Katyr-Yurt and afterwards a refugee convoy under white flags. The village was also previously bombed by the Russians in 1995 and in 1996.

== Events ==
Journalists who managed to report on the area confirmed the use, by the Russians, of the vacuum bomb on the town. The residents, including many civilian refugees who had fled the fighting in Grozny, were not warned in advance or told of safe exit routes by the Russian side. The sudden heavy bombardment of the village began in the early hours of the morning and subsided at approximately 3 p.m. At that time, many of the villagers attempted to leave, believing that the military had granted a safe passage out of the village. As they were leaving by road, planes appeared and bombed the cars.

The final atrocity came in the afternoon of February 4. The Russians told the Chechens they would be able to leave in a convoy of buses with white flags attached. The convoy which the Russians themselves dispatched for the Chechens was then bombed by the Russians.

A resident of the village claimed that Chechen fighters entered the village on 5 February.

Ultimately, the bombing lasted for two days and resulted in the deaths of at least 363 civilians, all Russian citizens. Many more were injured.

== European Court of Human Rights judgments ==
In the February 24, 2005, ruling, the European Court of Human Rights held Russia responsible for the civilian deaths in Katyr-Yurt:

The Court concluded that the military operation in Katyr-Yurt, aimed at either disarmament or destruction of the fighters, had not been spontaneous. The Court regarded it as evident that when the military had contemplated the deployment of aviation equipped with heavy combat weapons within the boundaries of a populated area, they should also have considered the inherent dangers. There was however no evidence to conclude that such considerations played a significant role in the planning.

The military used heavy free-falling high-explosion aviation bombs FAB-250 and FAB-500 with a damage radius exceeding 1,000 metres. Using this kind of weapon in a populated area, outside wartime and without prior evacuation of the civilians, was impossible to reconcile with the degree of caution expected from a law-enforcement body in a democratic society.

It was further noted that no martial law and no state of emergency had been declared in Chechnya, and no derogation has been entered under Article 15 of the Convention. The operation therefore had to be judged against a normal legal background.

Even when faced with a situation where, as the Government had submitted, the villagers had been held hostage by a large group of fighters, the primary aim of the operation should be to protect lives from unlawful violence. The use of indiscriminate weapons stood in flagrant contrast with this aim and could not be considered compatible with the standard of care prerequisite to an operation of this kind involving the use of lethal force by State agents.

In 2010, the court delivered a judgement in another case related to Katyr-Yurt events: Abuyeva and Others v. Russia.

Judgment in the third case related to the bombing was adopted by European Court of Human Rights in 2015.

== See also ==
- Grozny ballistic missile attack, another attack that resulted in massive civilian losses.
- Russian war crimes
