= Shalazhi =

Rural locality in Chechnya, Russia

Shalazhi Шалажи
- Selo

Other transcription(s)
  - Chechen: Шалажа
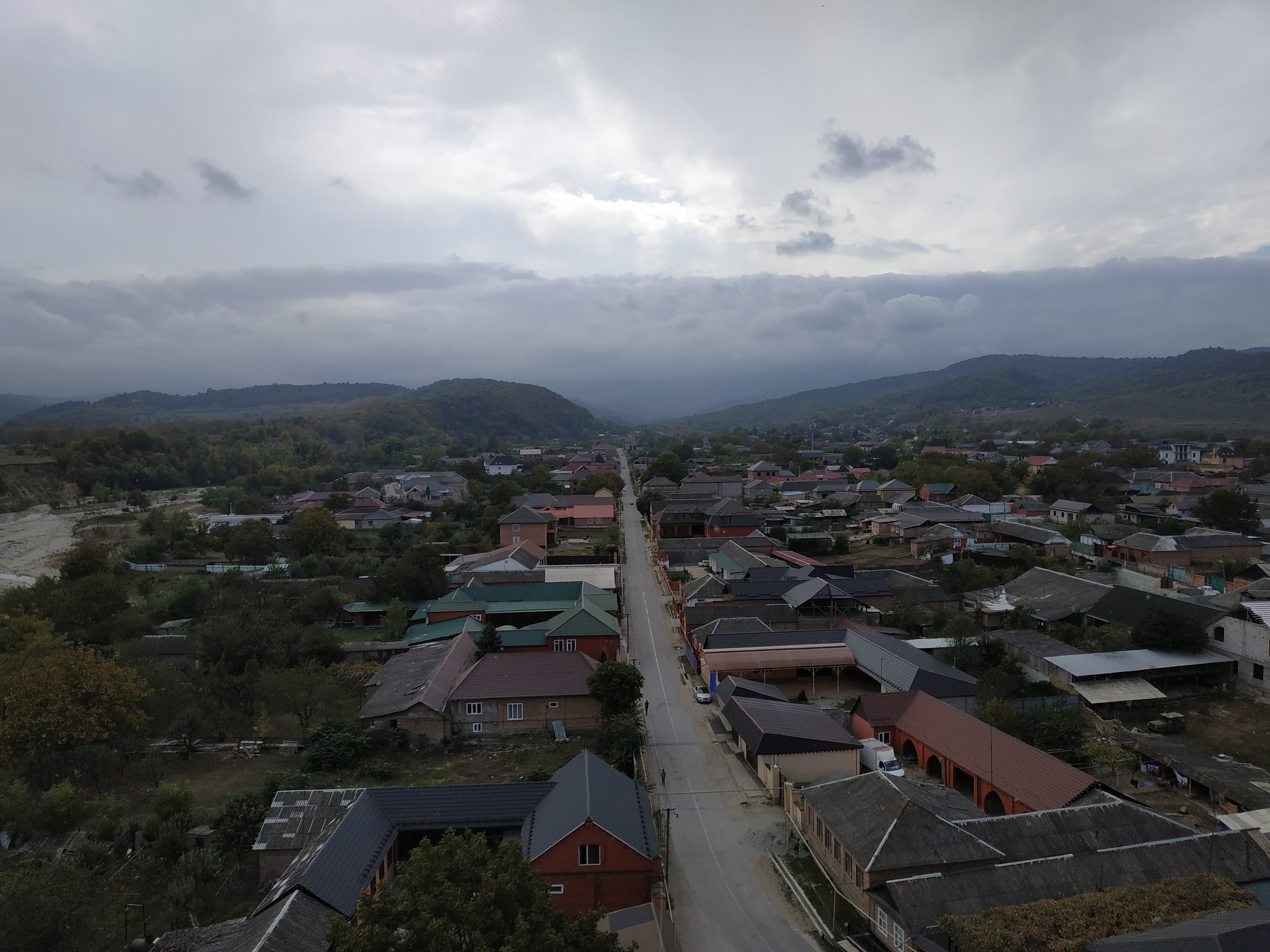
- View of Shalazhi from the minaret of Shalazhi Mosque.
- Interactive map of Shalazhi
- Location of Shalazhi Shalazhi (Chechnya)
- Coordinates: 43°06′00″N 45°21′25″E
- Country: Russia
- Federal subject: Chechnya
- Administrative district: Urus-Martanovsky District
- Founded: 1840
- Elevation: 377 m (1,237 ft)

Population
  - Estimate (2020): 5,332 )
- Time zone: UTC+3 (MSK)
- Postal code: 366512
- OKTMO ID: 96634428101

Shalazhi (Russian: Шалажи; Chechen: Шалажа, Şalaƶa) is a rural locality (a selo) in the Urus-Martanovsky District, the Chechen Republic, Russia.

== Geography ==
Shalazhi is located west of the republic on the foothills of the Greater Caucasus mountains and is located on the banks of the Shalezha River. It is 15 kilometres (9.3 mi) west of Urus-Martan and 37 kilometres (23 mi) south-west of the City of Grozny.

The nearest settlements to Shalazhi are Katyr-Yurt and Valerik in the north, Gekhi-Chu in the east and Yandi in the north-west.

== History ==
=== 1944–1958 ===
In 1944, after the genocide and deportation of the Chechen and Ingush people and the Chechen-Ingush ASSR was abolished, the village of Shalazhi (Şalaƶa) was renamed to Podgornoye.

In 1958, after the Vaynakh people returned and the Chechen-Ingush ASSR was restored, the village regained its old names, Shalazhi in Russian, and Şalaƶa in Chechen.

=== Present time ===
In 2020, the village made headlines as the place where Abdullah Anzorov was buried. A young radicalized Chechen refugee living in France with his family, he decapitated a history teacher named Samuel Paty he believed was guilty of blasphemy against Muhammad.

His burial, which was filmed with a cellphone and published on the internet, attracted significant controversy. Cries of Allahu Akbar (God is great in Arabic) accompanied the funeral procession are considered as support for Paty's murder, denied by some as being just a tribute to his death, like any deceased Muslim. Another controversy erupted after Russian news site news.ru claimed a street had been renamed in Anzorov's honour. The Chechen television of the Kadyrov administration (Grozny TV) denied this rumor, believing that is a fake news and a photo montage.

== Population ==
- 1979 Census: 5,044
- 1990 Census: 5,639
- 2002 Census: 5,307
- 2010 Census: 4,998
- 2012 Census: 5,032
- 2013 Census: 5,078
- 2014 Census: 5,094
- 2015 Census: 5,133
- 2016 Census: 5,169
- 2017 Census: 5,212
- 2018 Census: 5,267
- 2019 Census: 5,313
- 2020 Census: 5,332
