= Achkhoy-Martan =

Achkhoy-Martan Ачхой-Мартан

Other transcription(s)
  - Chechen: Iашхой-Марта
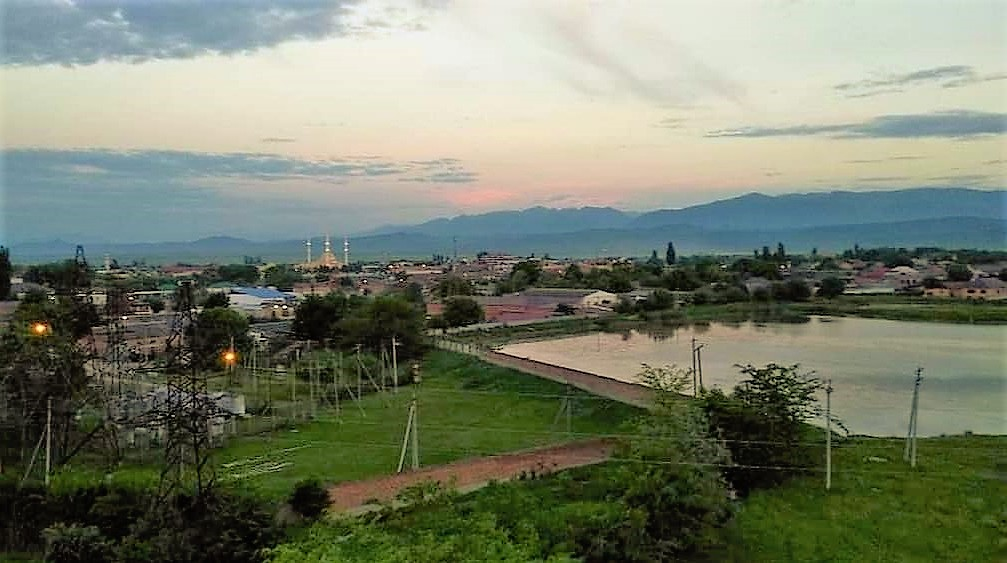
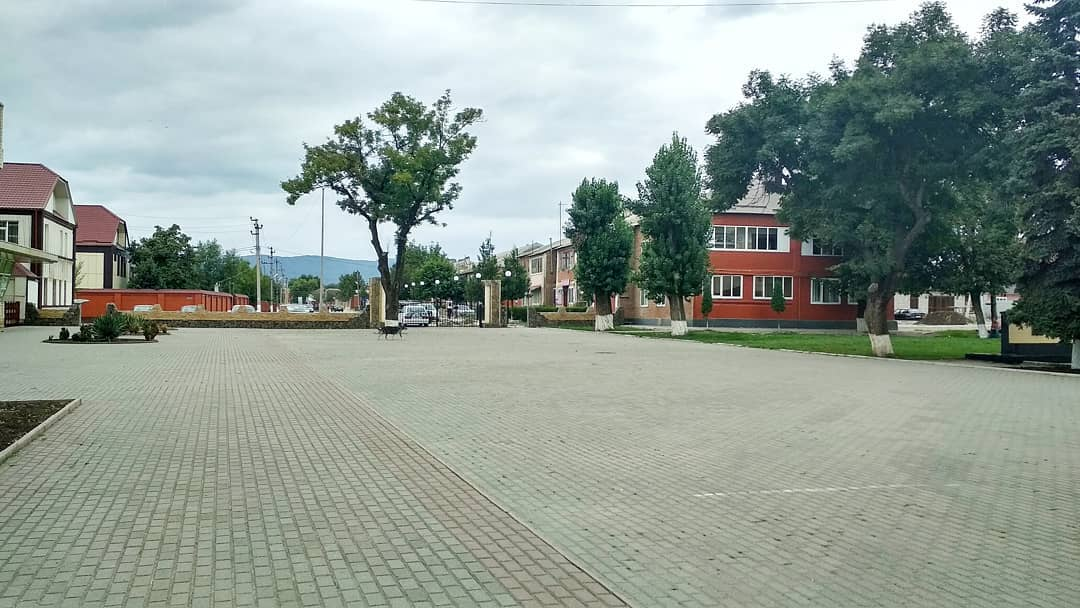
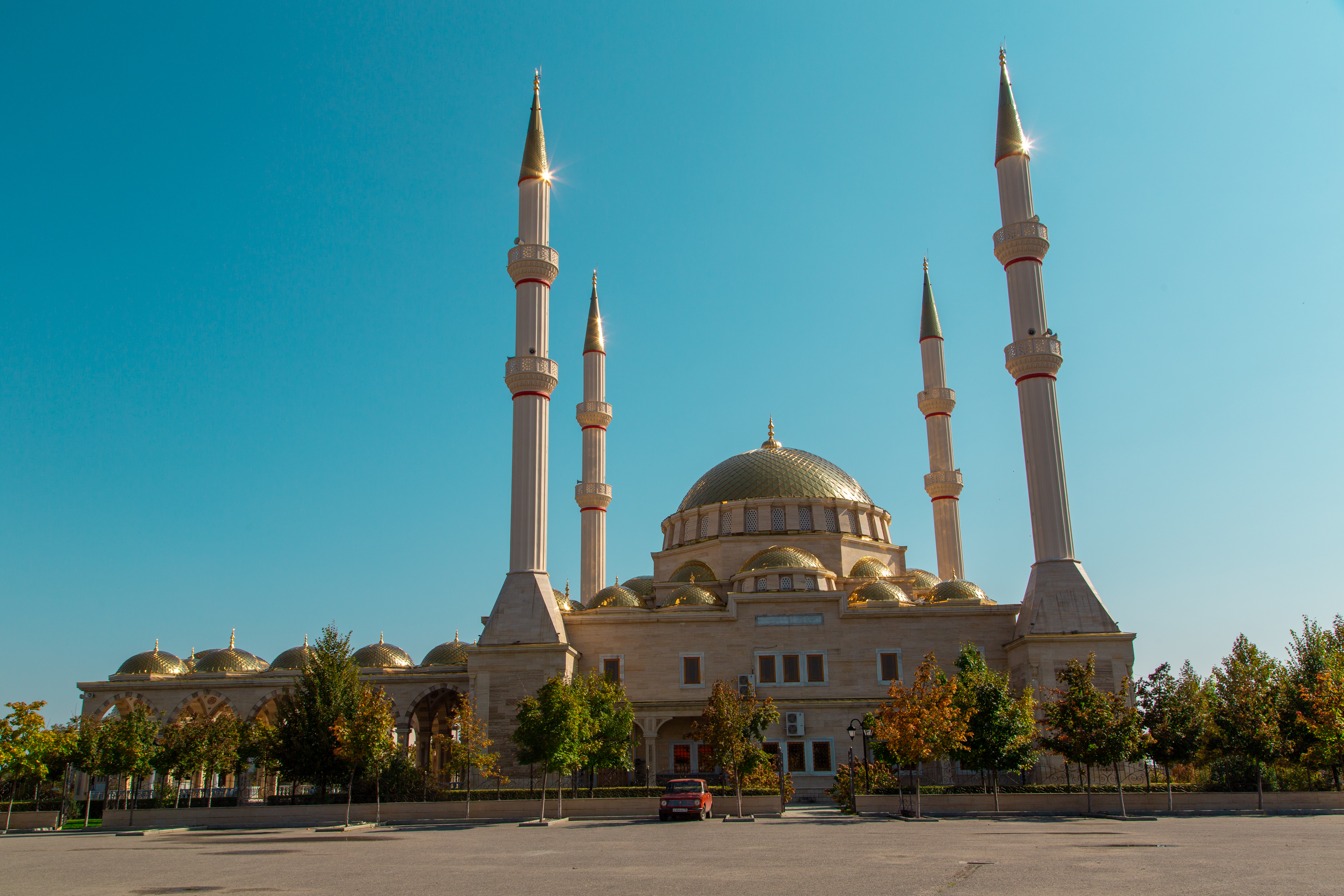
- From the top, Panoramic view of Achkhoy-Martan, Communal Square, Central Mosque Achkhoy-Martan in 2018
- Interactive map of Achkhoy-Martan
- Location of Achkhoy-Martan Achkhoy-Martan (European Russia) Achkhoy-Martan (Russia)
- Coordinates: 43°11′21″N 45°17′05″E
- Country: Russia
- Federal subject: Chechnya
- Founded: 1846
- Current status since: 2023
- Elevation: 250 m (820 ft)

Population
  - Estimate (1926): 5,096 )
- Time zone: UTC+3 (MSK)
- Postal code: 366600
- OKTMO ID: 96602402101

Achkhoy-Martan (Russian: Ачхой-Мартан, Chechen: Iашхой-Марта, Jaşxoy-Marta or Тӏехьа-Март, Theẋa-Mart) is a town and the administrative center of Achkhoy-Martanovsky District, Chechnya.

== Administrative and municipal status ==
Municipally, Achkhoy-Martan is incorporated as Achkhoy-Martan Urban Settlement. It is the administrative center of the municipality and is the only settlement included in it. Achkhoy-Martan is the administrative center of Achkhoy-Martanovsky District.

Town status was granted to Achkhoy-Martan in 2023.

== Geography ==
Map of Achkhoy-Martanovsky District with Achkhoy-Martan highlighted

The Fortanga River (Chechen: Марта) flows through the center of the village. To the east of the village is the Achkhu River. The name of the village comes from these two rivers.

Achkhoy-Martan is located 40 kilometres (25 mi) south-west of the city of Grozny. The nearest settlements to Achkhoy-Martan are Novy Sharoy in the north, Shaami-Yurt in the north-east, Katyr-Yurt in the east, Stary Achkhoy and Yandi in the south-east, Bamut in the south-west, and Assinovskaya in the north-west.

== History ==
In 1944, after the genocide and deportation of the Chechen and Ingush people and the Chechen-Ingush ASSR was abolished, the village of Achkhoy-Martan was renamed to Novoselskoye, and settled by people from other ethnic groups. From 1944 to 1957, it was the administrative center of the Novoselsky District of Grozny Oblast.

In 1957, when the Vaynakh people returned and the Chechen-Ingush ASSR was restored, the village regained its old name, Achkhoy-Martan.

The village came to national attention in Russia in 1999 during the second Chechen War when it saw intense fighting and suffered severe destruction. This event is featured in the popular Russian war song "Ты только маме, что я в Чечне, не говори"

== Population ==
- 1959 Census: 8,389
- 1970 Census: 12,250
- 1979 Census: 12,276
- 1989 Census: 14,680
- 1990 Census: 15,101
- 2002 Census: 16,742
- 2010 Census: 20,172
- 2019 estimate: 24,212

According to the results of the 2010 Census, the majority of residents of Achkhoy-Martan (20,113 or 99.7%) were ethnic Chechens, with 59 people (0.3%) coming from other ethnic backgrounds.

== Infrastructure ==
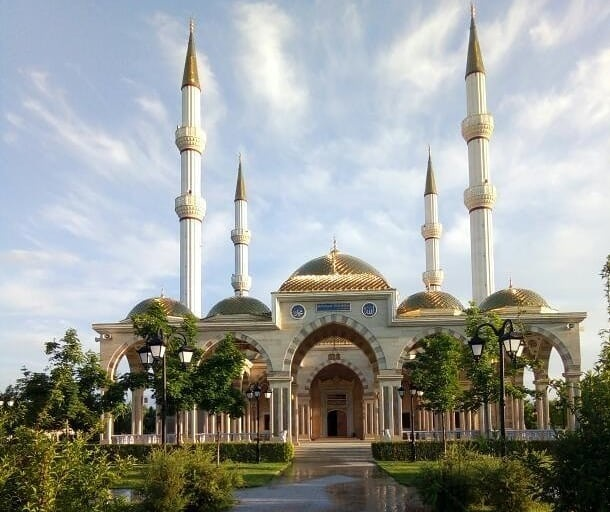
The mosque in Achkhoy-Martan.

The district library in Achkhoy-Martan has around 70,000 books. The village also hosts nine secondary schools, an eight-year school, three kindergartens, and a youth center. Prior to the outbreak of hostilities, a boarding school was also present in Achkhoy-Martan. The village also hosts a mosque.

== Industry ==
The Achkhoy-Martan state farm exists in the village, and engages in cereal crops, cattle breeding and gardening. The village also hosts the largest seed processing plant in Chechnya, as well as a plastic factory, one of the largest bases of building materials in the republic.

== Sport ==
The village has its own football club "Marta", volleyball team "Achkhoy", a sports club, and hosts competitions in judo, karate, taekwondo and boxing.

== Famous people ==
- Beta of Achhoy, the chief imam of Shamil during the Caucasian War.
- Tamerlan Bashaev, judoka.
- Yunus Desheriev, scholar and linguist.
- Magomet Mamakaev, Chechen poet, prose writer, publicist, and literary critic.
- Magomed Nadaev, the president of the Chechen Federation of Kyokushin Karate, a 5th dan black belt, an honored coach of the Chechen Republic in karate, and an IKO Matsushima branch chief.
- Magomed Bibulatov, famous MMA fighter.
- Rassambek Akhmatov, professional footballer.
- Ziya Bazhayev, businessman.
