= Achkhoy-Martanovsky District =

Achkhoy-Martanovsky District Ачхой-Мартановский район (Russian)
- District

Other transcription(s)
  - Chechen: Тӏеьха-Мартан кӏошт
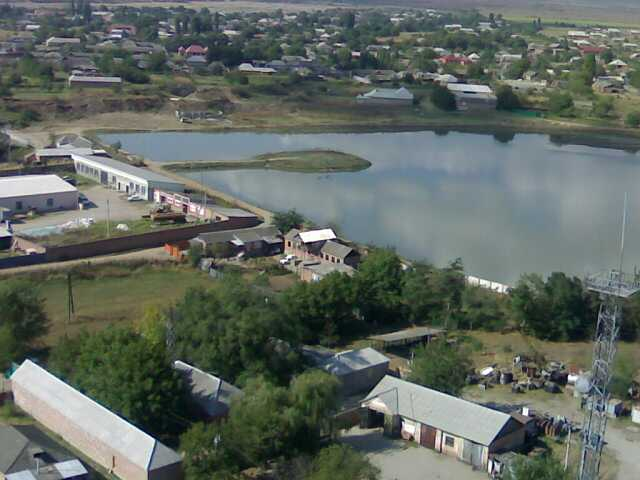
- The selo of Achkhoy-Martan, the administrative center of the district

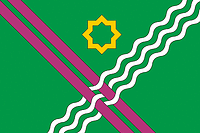
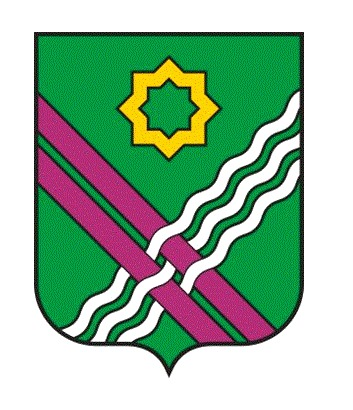
- Flag Coat of arms
- Location of Achkhoy-Martanovsky District in the Chechen Republic
- Coordinates: 43°11′18″N 45°16′43″E
- Country: Russia
- Federal subject: Chechen Republic
- Established: 1935
- Administrative center: Achkhoy-Martan

Area
  - Total: 1,100 km^{2} (420 sq mi)

Population (2010 Census)
  - Total: 78,505
  - Density: 71/km^{2} (180/sq mi)
  - Urban: 0%
  - Rural: 100%

Administrative structure
  - Administrative divisions: 12 rural administration
  - Inhabited localities: 12 rural localities

Municipal structure
  - Municipally incorporated as: Achkhoy-Martanovsky Municipal District
  - Municipal divisions: 0 urban settlements, 12 rural settlements
- Time zone: UTC+3 (MSK)
- OKTMO ID: 96602000
- Website: http://a-martan.ru/

Achkhoy-Martanovsky District (Russian: Ачхо́й-Марта́новский райо́н; Chechen: Тӏеьха-Мартан кӏошт, Theẋa-Martan khoşt) is an administrative and municipal district (raion), one of fifteen in the Chechen Republic, Russia. It is located in the west of the republic. The area of the district is 1,100 square kilometers (420 sq mi). Its administrative center is the rural locality (a selo) of Achkhoy-Martan.

== Health care ==
State health facilities in the district are represented by one central district hospital in Achkhoy-Martan and one district hospital in Samashki.

== Demographics ==
Population: 78,505 (2010 census); 64,839 (2002 Census); 59,837 (1989 Soviet census). The population of Achkhoy-Martan accounts for 25.7% of the district's total population.
