= War crimes in the Second Chechen War =

Human rights violations were committed by the warring sides during the second war in Chechnya. Both Russian officials and Chechen rebels have been regularly and repeatedly accused of committing war crimes including kidnapping, torture, murder, hostage taking, looting, rape, decapitation, and assorted other breaches of the law of war. International and humanitarian organizations, including the Council of Europe and Amnesty International, have criticized both sides of the conflict for blatant and sustained violations of international humanitarian law.

== Crimes ==
=== Forced disappearances ===
Human rights campaigners estimate that since September 1999 – the start of the second Chechen conflict – as many as 5,000 people have disappeared and are feared dead. According to Amnesty International in 2005, Russian officials give about 2,000 as the official figure for "disappearances" since late 1999.

- In March 2001 Human Rights Watch (HRW) issued the report titled The "Dirty War" In Chechnya, which called the "disappearances" of detainees in the custody of Russian federal forces in Chechnya a major human rights crisis that the international community must address.
- On February 25–26, 2006, Alvaro Gil-Robles, resigning Council of Europe's Commissioner for Human Rights, visited Chechnya, together with his successor, Thomas Hammarberg ; they criticized abductions, impunity and lack of security in Chechnya. On March 2, 2006, Chechen ombudsman Nurdi Nukhadzhiyev stated the problem of forced disappearances of people in Chechnya cannot be solved by local authorities, adding that a special commission has to be created at federal level.
- On May 12, 2006, Dmitry Grushkin of the 'Memorial' human rights group told Interfax that at least 1,893 residents of Chechnya had been kidnapped since 2002; of those, he said, 653 were found alive, 186 were found dead, and 1,023 "disappeared". 'Memorial' monitors kidnappings for only 25-30 percent of Chechen territory.
- On November 13, 2006, HRW published a briefing paper on torture in Chechnya that it had prepared for the 37th session of the United Nations Committee Against Torture. The paper covered torture by personnel of the Second Operational Investigative Bureau (ORB-2), torture by units under the effective command of Ramzan Kadyrov, torture in secret detention and continuing "disappearances." According to HRW, torture "in both official and secret detention facilities is widespread and systematic in Chechnya. Based on extensive research, HRW concluded in 2005 that forced disappearances in Chechnya are so widespread and systematic that they constitute crime against humanity."

=== Mass hostage takings ===
==== Moscow theater hostage crisis ====
On October 23, 2002, over 40 terrorists took more than 700 hostages prisoner at a Moscow theater. The hostage-takers demanded an end to the Russian presence in Chechnya, and threatened to execute the hostages if their conditions were not met. The siege ended violently on October 26, when Russian troops were forced to storm the building after the detonation of some explosive devices inside. Many casualties resulted from the fact that unconscious victims' airways were blocked and sub-optimal care was given during the rescue. In particular, the failure of Russian authorities to equip their troops with opioid antidotes and their efforts to conceal the identity of the gas for days afterward hindered efforts to save the lives of the stricken hostages.

On November 2, Shamil Basayev assumed responsibility for the attack and apologized to Aslan Maskhadov for not informing him of the plan.

==== Beslan school siege ====
On September 1, 2004, a group of 32 heavily armed, masked men seized control of Middle School Number One and more than 1,000 hostages in Beslan, North Ossetia. Most of the hostages were children aged from six to sixteen years old. Following a tense two-day standoff punctuated by occasional gunfire and explosions, Alpha Group of the FSB raided the building. The fighting lasted more than two hours; ultimately 331 civilians, 11 commandos and 31 hostage-takers died.

Russian officials publicly linked Basayev and Maskhadov to the attack. Basayev claimed responsibility in a September 17 website publication; Maskhadov denounced the attacks and denied involvement. The carnage at Beslan and the outcry it caused has had an unexpected effect on the tactics employed by Chechen separatists and their allies.

==== Other hostage incidents ====
- March 15, 2001 – three Chechens hijacked a Russian Tu-154 aircraft with 174 people on board after it left Turkey; they forced it to land in Medina, Saudi Arabia. On March 16, Saudi commandos freed over 100 hostages, killing three people including a hijacker, a female flight attendant and a Turkish passenger. A Russian diplomat in Saudi Arabia said the leader of the hijackers was a "highly-trained military officer who appears to know what he is doing."
- April 22, 2001 – in Turkey pro-Chechen gunmen seized up to 100 hostages at a luxury hotel in Istanbul. The standoff lasted nearly 12 hours before the hostage-takers, armed with automatic rifles, surrendered; police said they had encountered no resistance from the gunmen and there were no reports of anybody being injured.
- October 29, 2004 – the State Duma hosted Vladimir Ustinov, head of the Prosecutor General's Office, to discuss the Putin administration's anti-terrorism strategy. As he explained it to the deputies, in future hostage-taking episodes the security agencies would have a formal statutory right to seize and detain the relatives of the suspected hostage-takers. The government would then let the terrorists know that it will do to these "counter-hostages" whatever the terrorists do to their own hostages.

Meanwhile, the practice of taking civilians hostages exists among the officers of Russian and local security agencies in Chechnya. On March 1, 2004, officers of security agencies seized more than 30 relatives of former Ichkerian defence minister Magomed Khambiyev, including women, in the Khambiyev family's native village of Benoy in Chechnya's Nozhay-Yurtovsky District. Magomed Khambiyev got an ultimatum to lay down his arms in exchange for the lives of his relatives; he did it, giving himself up to the authorities in a few days.

- June 3, 2006 – Russian diplomats in Iraq were seized when their convoy was waylaid by the Mujahedeen Shura Council. One was shot during the kidnapping; three others were later executed. The group hoped to pressure Russia into allowing Chechnya to secede and become an Islamic theocracy.

=== Massacres ===
==== Indiscriminate attacks ====
- On October 5, 1999, a bus filled with refugees was reportedly hit by a Russian tank shell, killing as many as 40 civilians and wounding several others.
- On October 7, 1999, federal forces carried out a cluster bomb attack on the village of Elistanzhy in Vedensky District. Within several minutes 27 people were killed; among them only eight were men of "fighting age", meaning aged 14 to 60. In the next two weeks, 21 more died of their wounds.
- On October 21, 1999, a series of Russian ballistic missile strikes on central Grozny killed at least 137 people, mostly civilians, and injured hundreds. The missiles hit the city's main marketplace, a maternity hospital and a mosque.
- On October 24, 1999, seven children were killed and 14 maimed by a Russian tank attack in Novy Sharoy; an adult man was also killed.
- On October 29, 1999, the Russian Air Force carried out a rocket attack on a large convoy of refugees who were using a "safe exit" route. Casualties were estimated at 50-100, among them several Red Cross workers, two journalists and many women and children.
- On February 4, 2000, in an attempt to stop the Chechen retreat, Russian forces bombed the village of Katyr-Yurt, then a civilian convoy under white flags, killing at least 170 civilians, while many more were injured.
- On February 9, 2000, a Russian tactical missile hit a crowd of people who had come to the local administration building in Shali, a town declared to be one of the "safe areas", to collect their pensions. The missile is estimated to have killed some 150 civilians, and was followed by an attack by combat helicopters causing further casualties. The Russian attack, which happened without any warning, was a response to infiltration of the town by a group of Chechen fighters who suffered few casualties.

==== Documented mass killings ====
- On December 3, 1999, at least 40 people fleeing the besieged Grozny were shot and killed by Russian troops, leaving only seven wounded survivors.
- In early December 1999, Russian troops under the command of General Vladimir Shamanov killed up to 41 civilians during a two-week drunken rampage in the village of Alkhan-Yurt, near Grozny.
- In several incidents during December 1999 and January 2000 in the Staropromyslovski district of Grozny, Russian troops killed at least 50 unarmed civilians, mostly elderly men and women.
- A particularly brutal massacre was carried out on February 5, 2000 in the suburb of Novye Aldi, where suspected members of OMON, a special purpose police unit from St Petersburg and contract soldiers summarily executed at least 60 civilians.
- Following the March 2000 Battle of Komsomolskoye about 70 Chechen combatants who were taken prisoner were officially amnestied, but almost all of them are believed to have been murdered in captivity.

From 1999 to 2004, the Chernokozovo detention center operated as a filtration and torture camp, and human rights abuses were documented in the facility.

=== Rebel bombings ===
- September 6–14, 1999 – a series of nighttime explosions in apartment buildings using hexogen (RDX) killed 307 and injured 1,700 people. Four buildings in Moscow, Buinaksk and Volgodonsk were destroyed. (Disputed – Evidence points to a russian false flag operation.)
- May 9, 2002 – an explosion of a Russian-made anti-personnel mine in the Dagestani town of Kaspiysk killed 45 and wounded some 175 soldiers and civilian bystanders during a military parade. A Dagestani pro-Chechen group blamed for an attack had previously killed seven Russian soldiers on January 18, 2001, in the Dagestani capital, Makhachkala.
- June 12, 2005 – a bomb planted by Russian nationalist extremists, said to be veterans of the Chechen wars belonging to the Russian National Unity group, derailed the Grozny-Moscow passenger train some 150 kilometers south of the Russian capital. Dozens of people were injured, but only eight hospitalized. On May 30, 2006, suspects Vladimir Vlasov and Mikhail Klevachyov were charged with terrorism and attempting to commit murder motivated by ethnic or religious hatred.

==== Suicide bombings ====
Between June 2000 and September 2004, Chechen insurgents added suicide attacks to their weaponry. During this period there were 23 Chechen related suicide attacks in and outside Chechnya, targeting both military and civilian targets, the profiles of the suicide bombers have varied just as much as the circumstances surrounding the bombings. Although only six of the attacks were directed against civilians, these attacks have drawn the lion's share of the publicity generated by Chechen suicide tactics.

- July 5, 2003 – 19-year-old Zulichan Elichadzjijeva blew herself up outside a rock festival at the Tushino airfield near Moscow. Her bomb did not detonate as expected. 15 minutes later, only a few meters from the site of the first attack, 26-year-old Zinaida Alijeva detonated her explosives and killed 11 people instantly. Four more died in hospital. For many observers, the Tushino attacks appeared out of place.
- December 5–10, 2003 – a shrapnel-filled bomb which was believed to be strapped to a lone male suicide attacker ripped apart a commuter train near Chechnya, killing 46 people and wounding nearly 200. The explosion occurred during a busy morning rush hour when the train was packed with many students and workers; it ripped the side of the train open as it approached a station near Yessentuki, 750 miles south of Moscow. Only five days later another blast shook Russia—this time five people were killed and 44 injured in Red Square in the very heart of Moscow. Shamil Basayev later claimed responsibility for organising the December 2003 attacks.
- February 6, 2004 – a bomb ripped through a Moscow metro car during the morning rush hour, killing 40 people and wounding 134. A previously unknown Chechen rebel group claimed responsibility for the bombing; the claim came from a group calling itself Gazoton Murdash, and was signed by Lom-Ali ("Ali the Lion"). According to the statement, the group launched the attack to mark the fourth anniversary of the killing of scores of Chechen civilians by Russian soldiers who took control of the Chechen capital Grozny.
- August 27, 2004 – 123 people were killed by a female suicide bomber in the Russian aircraft bombings of August 2004. Basayev again claimed responsibility.

== Terrorist raids ==
During the Insurgency phase of Second Chechen War, numerous raids and terrorist attacks were carried out by the jihadists. These include the 2004 Nalchik raid, 2004 Avtury raid, 2004 Nazran raid, 2004 Grozny raid, and the 2005 Nalchik raid. These attacks constitute as terrorism because they were attacks and armed incursions on infrastructure, civilian areas, civilians, government buildings, government officials, on law enforcement, and unarmed traffic patrol officers (ДПС), and also often included hostage taking and the usage of civilians as human shields.

== Legal proceedings ==
=== Trial in Russia ===
==== Trials of Chechen separatists ====
Since the Russian authorities do not treat the war as an armed conflict and enemies as combatants, the Chechen separatists are invariably described by the Russian government as terrorists or bandits. Captured extremists are routinely tried for such articles of the Russian criminal code as illegal weapons possession, "forming and participating in illegal armed groups," and banditry. This strips detainees of key rights and protection under the Geneva Convention rules of war, including the right to be released at the end of the conflict and not to be held criminally liable for lawful combat. Participation in combat is treated as murder or attempted murder and terrorism, making little if any distinction with incidents of actual murders and terrorism.

- One of the earliest war crimes trials to be held was that of Salman Raduyev, a notorious ex-field commander for the rebel Chechen forces. Raduyev was convicted in December 2001 of terrorism and murder charges and sentenced to life imprisonment. He died in a Russian prison colony a year later.
- On February 21, 2001, a Chechen field commander Salautdin Temirbulatov was sentenced to life in prison for murdering four Russian contract soldiers whose execution in 1996 was filmed on video tape. When Russia invaded Chechnya for the second time in September 1999, the video became a powerful weapon in the Kremlin's propaganda war, as it was shown to soldiers preparing for active service in the war-torn republic. Temirbulatov was also accused of terrorism and abducting Russian special unit servicemen taken prisoner during their raid into Chechnya in 1997.
- On May 26, 2006, Nur-Pashi Kulayev was jailed for life for his part in the Beslan school siege.

==== Trials of Russian servicemen ====
The cases of a Russian servicemen being tried for war crimes are few and far between, no one has been charged with mistreatment or the murder of captured enemy fighters. Nevertheless, several servicemen have been accused and convicted of crimes against civilians.

- On July 25, 2003, after a series of trials and retrials, Russian tank unit commander Col. Yuri Budanov was sentenced to 10 years in prison for the March 2000 abduction and murder of a Chechen woman, Elza Kungaeva. According to the newspaper Novye Izvestia Budanov mysteriously disappeared: he had left the prison colony in Dmitrovgrad but he did not arrive at his destination, a prison colony in Ulyanovsk Oblast.
- On April 29, 2004, a Russian court in Rostov-on-Don acquitted four GRU special forces unit officers of the fatal shooting of six Chechen civilians, including a disabled woman. In the incident in January 2000, Captain Eduard Ulman's unit killed a civilian and subsequently extrajudicially executed five more with silenced weapons; the commandos then burned the bodies in the victims' vehicle. They were found not guilty in a retrial on May 19, 2005. Although the four admitted the killings, the court ruled that their actions were not punishable as they had been following orders. The acquittals of Cpt. Ulman and his three subordinates sparked a public outrage in Chechnya, where rights advocates and many Chechens say Russian forces act with impunity. During the third court hearing Ulman and the two officers mysteriously disappeared. In 2007, they officers were all found guilty and received prison sentences ranging from 9 to 14 years. Aleksei Perelevsky, the only officer present for the trial, received a 9-year sentence.
- On March 29, 2005, a court in Grozny found Lieutenant Sergey Lapin (a police officer) "Kadet" and a member of the Khanty–Mansi OMON, guilty of torturing the "disappeared" Chechen civilian Zelimkhan Murdalov in January 2001, and sentenced him to 11 years imprisonment, which was reduced to 10.5 years on appeal.
- On October 27, 2005, Mukhadi Aziyev, a company commander of the Vostok (East) Spetsnaz GRU unit, was convicted of "exceeding official authority", and given a three-year suspended sentence regarding the June 2005 Borozdinovskaya operation resulting in the death or disappearance of 12 ethnic Avar civilians on Chechnya's border with Dagestan.
- On April 5, 2006, Alexey Krivoshonok, a Russian serviceman, accused of killing three Chechen civilians at a roadblock in November 2005, admitted his guilt in his final plea. Next day, Krivoshonok, a contract soldier since 1995 whose rank was not disclosed, was sentenced to 18 years in prison for violent murder while under a state of alcoholic and narcotic intoxication.
- On May 15, 2006, the Grozny Garrison Military Circuit Court completed the trial of contract soldier, Private Pavel Zinchuk. He was sentenced to seven years in a general penal colony for shooting and wounding from "hooligan motives" three civilian persons in the village of Staraya Sunzha near Grozny.
- On December 27, 2007, Lt. Sergei Arakcheyev and Lt. Yevgeny Khudyakov were convicted by a Rostov-on-Don military court of the January 2003 of the killing of three local construction workers at a checkpoint in Chechnya and sentenced to 15 and 17 years in prison, respectively. According to court papers, Khudyakov and Arakcheyev forced the victims out of their truck, ordered them to lie on the ground and shot them dead; the bodies were doused in fuel and set on fire. Khudyakov failed to appear for the verdict and the court said police would search nationwide for him. He was arrested in 2017. In 2022, Khudyakov was released from prison early after volunteering for service in the Wagner Group in the Russian invasion of Ukraine. He was killed in action on 10 September 2022.

=== European Court of Human Rights ===
In October 2004, the European Court of Human Rights (ECHR) agreed to try cases brought by Chechen civilians against the Russian government.

As of November 2007, 23 cases were decided by the Court. The cases include:

- The first trial concluded in February 2005. The Court ruled that the Russian government violated several articles of the European Convention on Human Rights, including a clause on the protection of property, a guarantee of the right to life, and a ban on torture and inhumane or degrading treatment, and ordered the Russian government to pay compensation to the six plaintiffs in the case. The cases concerned the Russian federal forces' indiscriminate aerial bombing of a civilian convoy of refugees fleeing Grozny in October 1999; the "disappearance" and subsequent extrajudicial execution of five individuals in Grozny in January 2000; and the indiscriminate aerial and artillery bombardment of the village of Katyr-Yurt in February 2000. The compensation has not been paid and NGOs claim that the applicants to the court have experienced persecution, including murders and disappearance.
- In summer 2006 the ECHR decided the first cases concerning forced disappearances from Chechnya; more than 100 disappearance cases related to Chechnya were pending in the court. The cases included one where the court ordered Russia to pay 35,000 euros to the mother of Khadzhi-Murat Yandiev for violating her son's "right to life" as well as failing "to conduct an effective investigation" into his February 2000 disappearance. Key evidence in the case, according to court documents, was video footage filmed by a reporter for NTV and CNN television showing an army officer, later identified by CNN reporters as Colonel-General Alexander Baranov, ordering soldiers to "finish off" and "shoot" Yandiev. Baranov has since been promoted and awarded a Hero of Russia medal and is now responsible for all Defense Ministry forces in the North Caucasus.
- On October 12, 2006, the Court held the Russian state responsible for the summary execution of the Estamirov family during the February 5, 2000 Novye Aldi massacre by OMON forces. "Russian and Chechen security forces should take this decision as a warning that the abuse and murder of innocent civilians cannot be met by impunity," said Europe and Central Asia director at Human Rights Watch. At least 11 other incidents of summary executions committed on the same day in the same region of Chechnya were pending before the Court.
- On November 9, 2006, the Court ruled the Russian government complicit in the murder and abduction of three Chechen civilians, including a case on the disappearance and presumed death of two Chechens from the same family. The court sided with Marzet Imakayeva, a Chechen woman who fled Russia two years ago to seek asylum in the United States. It also said that the way Imakayeva's complaints were dealt with by Russian authorities constituted "inhuman treatment." The bodies of Imakayeva family members have never been found. In the other case the abductee, the body of Nura Luluyeva turned up in a mass grave eight months later.
- On January 8, 2007, the Court condemned Russia in the first torture case from Chechnya to be heard by the ECHR. In its judgment, the Court stated that the applicants Adam and Arbi Chitayev had been held in unacknowledged detention, that they had been subjected to torture, and that the Russian authorities had not properly investigated their allegations.

== See also ==
- Deportation of the Chechens and Ingush
- International response to the Second Chechen War
- Russian war crimes
