= International response to the Second Chechen War =

Russia incurred much international criticism for its conduct during the Second Chechen War, which started in 1999. The governments of the United States and other countries condemned deaths and expulsions among civilians. The United Nations Commission on Human Rights (UNHCR) passed two resolutions in 2000 and 2001 condemning human rights violations in Chechnya and requiring Russia to set up an independent national commission of inquiry to investigate the matter. However, a third resolution on these lines failed in 2004. The Council of Europe in multiple resolutions and statements between 2003 and 2007 called on Russia (a member of the Council) to cease human rights violations. The European Court of Human Rights (ECHR) between 2005 and 2007 conducted legal cases brought by Chechens against the Russian government, and in many of these cases held Russia responsible for deaths, disappearances and torture.

== Governments ==
=== Western countries ===
There had been strong international condemnation of Russia's threat to civilians to get out of the Chechen capital, Grozny, or be considered an enemy target and destroyed. The United States and the European Union denounced the move. There had been speculation about possible economic sanctions.

US President Bill Clinton said Russia would "pay a heavy price" for its current tactics, facing international isolation. The EU also urged Russia to end what they called disproportionate and indiscriminate use of force in Chechnya. The United Kingdom Secretary of State for Foreign and Commonwealth Affairs Robin Cook has "wholeheartedly condemned" the Russian ultimatum to the people of Grozny to flee or die. "We condemn vigorously what Milosevic did in Kosovo and we condemn vigorously what Russia is doing in Chechnya," he said.

On November 18, 1999, then presidential candidate George W. Bush strongly criticised Russia over its military campaign in Chechnya, saying foreign aid to Russia should be suspended if Russian policy did not change. "I think Russia has stepped over the bounds," Bush said.

The United States statement in response to Human Rights Commission Resolution on Chechnya in 2000 noted:

As Secretary Albright noted in her March 24th speech to the Commission, "We cannot ignore the fact that thousands of Chechen civilians have died and more than 200,000 have been driven from their homes." Together with other delegations, we have expressed our alarm at the persistent, credible reports of human rights violations by Russian forces in Chechnya, including extrajudicial killings. There are also reports that Chechen separatists have committed abuses, including the killing of civilians and prisoners. ... The war in Chechnya has greatly damaged Russia's international standing and is isolating Russia from the international community. Russia's work to repair that damage, both at home and abroad, or its choice to risk further isolating itself, is the most immediate and momentous challenge that Russia faces.

=== Other countries ===
On December 9, 1999, at a meeting with Li Peng, China's legislative chairman and the Chinese Communist Party's most hard-line leader, Boris Yeltsin told reporters he wanted to send a message to Clinton, who had criticized Russia for causing civilian casualties in Chechnya. "Yesterday, Clinton allowed himself to put pressure on Russia. He apparently forgot for a second, a minute, half a minute, what Russia is, that Russia possesses a full arsenal of nuclear weapons. He forgot about this, so he decided to flex his muscles, as they say. I want to say to Clinton: let him not forget what kind of world he lives in. It has never been and never will be the case that he alone dictates to the whole world how to live, how to work, how to rest... And so on. No, and again no. A multipolar world is the basis for everything, as we agreed with Jiang Zemin, President of the People's Republic of China. We will dictate to the world how to live, not him alone," Yeltsin said. Yeltsin and General Secretary of the Chinese Communist Party Jiang Zemin discussed and both criticized U.S. global dominance. "Jiang Zemin completely understands and fully supports Russia's actions in combatting terrorism and extremism in Chechnya," Russian Foreign Minister Igor Ivanov said afterwards. Chinese Foreign Ministry said that China "understands and supports the efforts made by Russia in safeguarding national unity and territorial integrity."

On 26 September 2002, after Saddam Hussein's meeting with the Chechen pro-Moscow President Akhmad Kadyrov, Iraq's Foreign Minister Naji Sabri stated the country's position with regard to Chechnya, namely that Chechnya is an integral part of Russia. "Iraq is firmly against any manifestations of separatism in Russia."

On 30 September 2001, Georgian President Eduard Shevardnadze offered mediation in talks between the Chechen leader Aslan Maskhadov and Russian President Vladimir Putin. Georgian Interior Minister Kakha Targamadze ruled out that Georgia and Russia would conduct the joint operations against Chechen rebels in the Georgia's Pankisi region, where the rebels allegedly had been hiding according to Russian officials.

== Council of Europe ==
Council of Europe Resolutions and Recommendations on 'The human rights situation in the Chechen Republic':

- Resolution 1323 (2003)
- Resolution 1402 (2004)
- Resolution 1403 (2004)
- Recommendation 1678 (2004)
- Recommendation 1679 (2004)

In June 2005, the Parliamentary Assembly of the Council of Europe (PACE) examined Russia's progress in honoring the obligations and commitments it undertook on joining the Council of Europe in 1996. PACE passed a resolution which stated that there had been very little progress in relation to the obligation to bring to justice those responsible for human rights violations. The resolution called on the Russian authorities to "take effective action to put an immediate end to the ongoing 'disappearances', torture, arbitrary detention in illegal and secret facilities, and unlawful killings" reported in Chechnya.

The June 9, 2006 PACE report by Dick Marty said "It is hardly possible to speak of secret detention centers in Council of Europe member states without mentioning Chechnya. Mr Bindig's very recent report also notes not only numerous cases of forced disappearance and torture, but also the existence of secret places of detention." It quoted "Damning recent accounts by witnesses."

On March 13, 2007 the new Council of Europe report said "resort to torture and other forms of ill-treatment by members of law enforcement agencies and security forces continues, as does the related practice of unlawful detentions." The Council said it felt forced to make public its findings in light of the Russian authorities' "failure to improve the situation" despite detailed recommendations following the torture committee's visits to Chechnya the previous year.

=== European Court of Human Rights ===
In October 2004, the European Court of Human Rights (ECHR) agreed to try cases brought by Chechen civilians against the Russian government. As of November 2007, 35 cases were decided.

The first trial concluded in February 2005. The Court ruled that the Russian government violated several articles of the European Convention on Human Rights, including a clause on the protection of property, a guarantee of the right to life, and a ban on torture and inhumane or degrading treatment, and ordered the Russian government to pay compensation to the six plaintiffs of the case. The cases concerned the Russian federal forces' indiscriminate aerial bombing of a civilian convoy of refugees fleeing Grozny in October 1999; the "disappearance" and subsequent extrajudicial execution of five individuals in Grozny in January 2000; and the indiscriminate aerial and artillery bombardment of the village of Katyr-Yurt in February 2000. The compensations were not paid, NGOs claim that applicants to the court are met with repressions, including murders and disappearance. In the most dramatic period of 2000-2002 five plaintiffs died.

In summer 2006 the European Court on Human Rights decided the first cases concerning forced disappearances in Chechnya; it was accepted the decisions by the European Court might play an important role in changing Chechnya's terrible human rights situation, as more than 100 disappearance cases related to Chechnya are pending in the court. The cases included one where the court ordered Russia to pay €35,000 to the mother of Khadzhi-Murat Yandiev for violating her son's "right to life" as well as failing "to conduct an effective investigation" into his February 2000 disappearance. Key evidence in the case, according to court documents, was video footage filmed by a reporter for NTV and CNN television showing Colonel-General Alexander Baranov, ordering soldiers to "finish off" and "shoot" Yandiev; Baranov has since been promoted and awarded a Hero of Russia medal and made responsible for all Defense Ministry forces in the North Caucasus.

On October 12, 2006, the Court held Russian state responsible for the summary execution of the Estamirov family during the February 5, 2000 Novye Aldi massacre by the OMON forces. "Russian and Chechen security forces should take this decision as a warning that the abuse and murder of innocent civilians cannot be met by impunity," said Europe and Central Asia director at Human Rights Watch. At least 11 other incidents of summary executions committed on the same day in the same region of Chechnya are pending before the Court.

On November 9, 2006, the Court ruled the Russian government complicit in the murder and abduction of three Chechen civilians, including a case on the disappearance and presumed death of two Chechens from the same family. The court sided with Marzet Imakayeva, a Chechen woman who fled Russia two years ago to seek asylum in the United States; it also said the way Imakayeva's complaints were dealt with by Russian authorities constituted "inhuman treatment." The bodies of Imakayeva family members have never been found; in the other ruled case the abductee, Nura Luluyeva, turned up in a mass grave eight months later.

On January 8, 2007, the Court has condemned Russia in the first torture case from Chechnya to be heard by the ECHR. In its judgment, the Court held that the applicants Adam and Arbi Chitayev had been held in unacknowledged detention, that they had been subjected to torture, and that the Russian authorities have not properly investigated their allegations.

== United Nations ==
=== UNHCR ===
A resolution adopted in April 2000 by the United Nations Commission on Human Rights (UNCHR) called for Russia, among other things, to establish a "national broad-based and independent commission of inquiry" into abuse, with a view to bringing perpetrators to justice and preventing impunity. It was the first time in the UNHCR history it had criticized a permanent United Nations Security Council member. However, Russia has not fulfilled the resolution's requirements.

On April 20, 2001, the UNHCR adopted another resolution condemning human rights violations in Chechnya perpetrated by federal forces, citing "forced disappearances, extrajudicial, summary and arbitrary executions, torture, and other inhuman and degrading treatment." The resolution called on Russia to "ensure that both civilian and military prosecutor's offices undertake systematic, credible and exhaustive criminal investigations and prosecutions" of all violations of international human rights and humanitarian law. It reiterated its requirement, also made in 2000 resolution, for Russia to establish a national commission of inquiry to investigate crimes in Chechnya; despite Russia's failure to create such a commission or ensure effective prosecutions after the 2000 resolution, the commission declined to call for the creation of an international commission of inquiry.

In April 2004 the Commission rejected another resolution on Chechnya. 23 of 53 countries voted against the resolution, while 12 countries voted for the resolution—mainly European Union countries. Russian Foreign Minister Sergey Lavrov said "all attempts to depict the situation in Chechnya as a human rights problem have been unrealistic."

On February 22, 2006, UN High Commissioner for Human Rights, Louise Arbour, said she was deeply shocked by accounts of torture and kidnappings in Chechnya. She recommended the creation of an independent body to investigate crimes committed during the war.

On March 30, 2006, Manfred Nowak, the United Nations investigator on torture said that Moscow had agreed to let him visit Russia, including the troubled region—the first such trip by a UN torture envoy in more than a decade.

== See also ==
- Reactions to the First Chechen War
- Second Chechen War crimes and terrorism
