= List of European Court of Human Rights judgments =

The following is a list of notable judgments by the European Court of Human Rights.

== Climate ==
=== Verein KlimaSeniorinnen Schweiz v Switzerland ===
Verein KlimaSeniorinnen Schweiz v Switzerland (2024) was a landmark European Court of Human Rights case in which the court ruled that Switzerland violated the European Convention on Human Rights by failing to adequately address climate change. It is the first climate change litigation in which an international court has ruled that state inaction violates human rights.

== Disability rights ==
=== Alajos Kiss v. Hungary ===
On 20 May 2010, the Court ruled in Alajos Kiss v. Hungary (38832/06) that Hungary cannot restrict voting rights only on the basis of guardianship due to a psychosocial disability. The Court awarded Mr. Kiss with EUR 3,000.

=== Toplak and Mrak v. Slovenia ===
In the Toplak and Mrak v. Slovenia judgment, issued October 2021, the Court ruled that Slovenia had violated two wheelchair users' right to an effective legal remedy in a 2015 referendum on gay marriage. Slovenia's Supreme Court had ruled that voters had not had a right to request accessible polling places ahead of the vote, but only after the election would be over. Slovenia's Supreme Court stated that no court in Slovenia had jurisdiction over such cases. The ECHR found a violation of Article 13.

The Court also ruled that polling places in Europe need to be accessible for persons with disabilities but accepted that accessibility does not require that voters go through the building’s front entrance. It found no violation in Slovenia's abandonment of voting equipment which had enabled voters to vote by secret ballot. It found acceptable a scheme in which a voter who could not cast a ballot by himself had to disclose his vote to a family member who would fill out a ballot for him.

== Freedom of speech ==
=== Appleby v. UK ===
This 2003 case involved balancing the right of freedom of speech against the rights of private property owners. The issue was whether shopping centers in new towns, by assuming the functions of traditional high streets, must also assume the responsibility of serving as a public forum. The Court considered but declined to follow the decision of the Supreme Court of California in the landmark case of Robins v. Pruneyard Shopping Center (affirmed by the U.S. Supreme Court in Pruneyard Shopping Center v. Robins (1980)).

=== E.S. v. Austria ===
In the 2018 case E.S. v. Austria the Court upheld the ruling of the Austrian courts that imposed a fine on a woman for calling Muhammad a pedophile. The Court maintained that Article 10 was not violated by the Austrian courts, because the plaintiff's "comments were not objective, failed to provide historical background and had no intention of promoting public debate." The ruling drew a lot of criticism for not upholding the freedom of speech (guaranteed under ECHR Article 10) and fears of promoting "anti-blasphemy laws" that endanger free thought.

== Military actions ==
=== Cases of Russian Military Abuses ===
Since the Russian military invaded Chechnya for the second time in 1999, the Court agreed to hear cases of human rights abuse brought forward by Chechen civilians against Russia in the course of the Second Chechen War, with 104 rulings to date as of April 2009 (including regarding the cases of torture and extrajudicial executions). In 2007, the Court ruled that Russia was responsible for the killings of a human rights activist, Zura Bitiyeva, and her family. Bitiyeva herself had filed a complaint against Moscow with the Court in 2000 for abuse while in detention, in the then-second case from Chechnya, but she was murdered in 2003 before the ruling was issued. Other cases ruled against Russia included the deaths (or presumed deaths after years of forced disappearance) of Ruslan Alikhadzhyev, Shakhid Baysayev, Nura Luluyeva and Khadzhi-Murat Yandiev, the case of the indiscriminate bombing of Katyr-Yurt, and some of the deaths during the Novye Aldi massacre. As of 2008, the Court has been flooded by complaints from Chechnya, what the Human Rights Watch called "the last hope for the victims".

A European court case that received an unprecedented level of attention in Russia and in the countries of the former Soviet Union was Kononov vs Latvia, in which the Grand Chamber ruled against Soviet WWII veteran, partisan fighter Vassili Kononov, accused of war crimes in now independent Latvia. The ruling was mentioned on numerous talk shows on television, led to sharp criticism and threats to pull out of the court among some high-ranking Russian politicians, and caused the State Duma to adopt a condemning resolution.

== Treatment of individuals ==
=== Ireland v United Kingdom ===
In December 1977, in the case of Ireland v United Kingdom (5310/71), the Court ruled that the government of the United Kingdom was guilty of "inhuman and degrading treatment", of men interned without trial, following a case brought by Ireland (Case No. 5310/71). The Court found that while their internment was an interference of the convention rights, it was justifiable in the circumstances; it however ruled that the practice of the five techniques and the practice of beating prisoners constituted inhumane and degrading punishment in violation of the convention, although not torture. This is considered a "key decision" by the court.

=== A. and others v. the United Kingdom ===
On 19 February 2009, in the case of A. and Others v. the United Kingdom, the Grand Chamber of the Court held unanimously that there had been a violation of right to liberty and security, a violation of right to have lawfulness of detention decided by a court, and violation of right to be compensated for such violations. The case concerned the applicants' complaints that they were detained in high security conditions under a statutory scheme that permitted the indefinite detention of non-nationals certified by the Secretary of State as suspected of involvement in terrorism. The applicants were 11 individuals, six of Algerian nationality; four, respectively, of French, Jordanian, Moroccan and Tunisian nationality; and, one, born in a Palestinian refugee camp in Jordan, and thus stateless. The Court made awards under Article 41 of the European Convention on Human Rights (just satisfaction) that were substantially lower than those it made in past cases of unlawful detention, since the detention scheme was devised in the face of a public emergency and as an attempt to reconcile the need to protect the United Kingdom public against terrorism with the obligation not to send the applicants back to countries where they faced a real risk of ill-treatment. The Court therefore awarded, to the six Algerian applicants EUR 3,400, EUR 3,900, EUR 3,800, EUR 3,400, EUR 2,500 and EUR 1,700, respectively; to the stateless and Tunisian applicants EUR 3,900, each; and to the Jordanian applicant, EUR 2,800. The applicants were jointly awarded EUR 60,000 for legal costs.

=== Torreggiani and Others v. Italy ===
On 8 January 2013, in Torreggiani and Others v. Italy, the Court unanimously found a violation of Article 3 in respect of seven prisoners held in the prisons of Busto Arsizio and Piacenza. Applying the pilot-judgment procedure, it held that overcrowding was a structural and systemic problem of the Italian prison system and obliged Italy to put in place, within one year of the judgment, remedies with preventive and compensatory effect.

== Refugees ==
=== Loizidou v. Turkey ===
In Loizidou v. Turkey the property rights of Greek-Cypriot refugees displaced by an invading Turkish army were addressed. In 2003 Turkey paid Ms. Loizidou compensation (of over $1 million) as ruled by the European Court of Human Rights.

=== Batasuna and Herri Batasuna v Spain ===
In June 2009, the Court supported the illegalization of the Basque party Batasuna (formerly Herri Batasuna) on the basis that its activity was part of the strategy of the terrorist group ETA, stating that its illegalization by Spain could be justified as necessary in a democratic society in the pursuit of the legitimate aim of preventing terrorism.

=== M.S.S. v Belgium and Greece ===
In the case M.S.S. v Belgium and Greece, the Court judged on 21 January 2011 that both the Greek and the Belgian governments violated the European Convention on Human Rights when applying the EU law (Dublin Regulation) on asylum seekers, and they were fined €6,000 and €30,000, respectively.

== Religion ==
=== Refah Partisi v Turkey ===
In upholding the Turkish Constitutional Court's dissolution of The Welfare Party (Refah Partisi) for violating Turkey's principle of secularism (by calling for the re-introduction of religious law) the court held "that sharia is incompatible with the fundamental principles of democracy." The Court justified the breach of the appellants' rights by reasoning that a legal regime based on sharia would diverge from the Convention's values, "particularly with regard to its criminal law and criminal procedure, its rules on the status of women and the way it intervenes in all spheres of private and public life in accordance with religious precepts."

=== Decisions on religious symbols and clothing ===
In several cases, the Court has ruled in favour of restricting the display of symbols and clothing as religious signs. In the case of Leyla Şahin v. Turkey, where adult Turkish women were refused entrance into lectures and examination rooms if they chose to wear a headscarf, the Court ruled in favour of the ban, arguing that it was based on the principles of secularism and equality. In the 2001 case of Dahlab v. Switzerland, the court upheld the government's right to require a teacher, who had recently converted to Islam, to remove her headscarf given that it was a "powerful external symbol" that could "influence" young children. In November and December 2008, the European Court dealt with Dogru v. France, and Kevanci v. France, both cases of 12-year-old Muslim girls expelled in 1999 from their schools for covering their head during phys-ed class. The European Court found no violation of the right to religion saying the girls had made an "ostentatious" display. In Mann Singh v. France, where a Sikh who had held driving licenses for 20 years with his picture showing him wearing a turban now had to remove his turban to continue to do so, the European Court rejected the case without a hearing. In Lautsi v. Italy the Court ruled unanimously in 2009 that crucifixes in Italian public school classes are contrary to parents' right to educate their children in line with their convictions and to children's right to freedom of religion (art. 2 of the 1st Protocol, and art. 9 of the Convention). According to the Court ruling: "the presence of the crucifix—which it was impossible not to notice in the classrooms - could easily be interpreted by pupils of all ages as a religious sign and they would feel that they were being educated in a school environment bearing the stamp of a given religion." In 2011, this judgment was reversed by a majority in the Grand Chamber of the Court.

== Vaccination ==
=== Vavřička and Others v. the Czech Republic ===
In the case of Vavřička and Others v. the Czech Republic, decided in April 2021, the court ruled that the nation of the Czech Republic did not violate the European Convention on Human Rights by imposing a vaccination mandate on children in that country. The legal challenge was initially filed by Czech citizen Pavel Vavřička, who had received a fine for refusing to vaccinate his children for tetanus, hepatitis B, and polio. The court found that the public health interest in achieving herd immunity from contagious diseases outweighed the individual right to privacy, and that the Czech law contained sufficient provisions for the exemption of those with medical or religious reasons for not receiving vaccination, neither of which were demonstrated by the objecting parent. The case was the first in which the ECtHR had ruled on the question of compulsory vaccination.

== Ferrazzini v Italy ==
In the Ferrazzini proceedings, the European Court addressed the evolving tension between the protections afforded by Convention rights protections and the powers of states to raise revenue by taxation. The judgment is notable because it decided that tax matters remain part of the State’s public‑law prerogatives and that, therefore, tax disputes do not fall under Article 6(1) of the Convention as to civil rights and obligations.

== Interstate cases ==
- Adjudicated on merits:
  - Ireland v. the United Kingdom (no. 5310/71, 5451/72) (see five techniques)
  - Cyprus v. Turkey (no. 25781/94)
  - Denmark v. Turkey (no. 34382/97)
  - Georgia v. Russia (no. 1) (no. 13255/07) (see 2006 deportation of Georgians from Russia)
  - Georgia v. Russia (no. 2) (no. 38263/08)
- Discontinued without judgment
  - Greece v. the United Kingdom (ECtHR) (nos. 176/56 and 299/57).
  - Austria v. Italy (no. 788/60)
  - Denmark, Norway and Sweden v. Greece (nos. 3321-23/67 and no. 4448/70) + Netherlands v. Greece (no. 3344/67)
  - Cyprus v. Turkey (1978) (nos. 6780/74, 6950/75 and 8007/77, EComHR interim report on the latter is kept confidential)
  - France, Norway, Sweden, Denmark and the Netherlands v. Turkey (nos. 9940/82-9944/82)
  - Georgia v. Russia (no. 3) (no. 61186/09)
  - Ukraine v. Russia (III) (no. 49537/14)
- Pending:
  - Ukraine v. Russia (no. 20958/14)
  - Ukraine v. Russia (II) (no. 43800/14)
  - Ukraine v. Russia (IV) (no. 42410/15)
  - Slovenia v. Croatia (no. 54155/16) (see Ljubljanska banka)

== Unanimous Chamber judgments reversed by the Grand Chamber ==
- Oršuš and Others v. Croatia: discrimination in education
- Lautsi v. Italy: freedom of religion and education
- Kotov v. Russia (54522/00): property rights
- Bouyid v. Belgium (23380/09): degrading treatment

== Judgments where the only judge finding a violation was from the state accused ==
- Perna v. Italy (48898/99)
- Zavoloka v. Latvia (58447/00)
- Ligeres v. Latvia (17/02)
- Velkhiyev and Others v. Russia (34085/06)

== Other cases ==
- List of ECHR cases concerning existence of political parties
- List of ECHR cases concerning legal ethics
- List of LGBT-related cases
