= Mass graves in Chechnya =

Aspect of the Chechen Wars

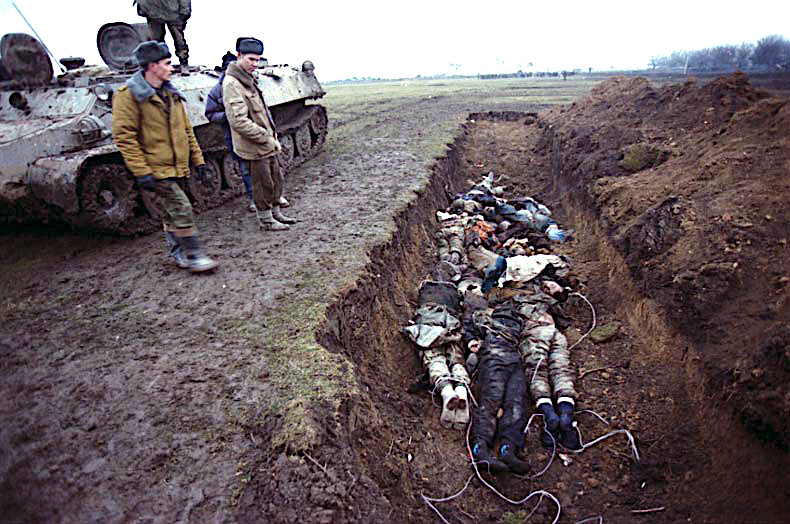
Russian troops burying corpses in a trench in Chechnya

Mass graves in Chechnya containing hundreds of corpses have been uncovered since the beginning of the Chechen wars in 1994. As of June 2008, there were 57 registered locations of mass graves in Chechnya. According to Amnesty International, thousands may be buried in unmarked graves including up to 5,000 civilians who disappeared since the beginning of the Second Chechen War in 1999. In 2008, the largest mass grave found to date was uncovered in Grozny, containing some 800 bodies from the First Chechen War in 1995. Russia's general policy to the Chechen mass graves is to not exhume them.

== Summary ==
In a March 2001 report, Human Rights Watch (HRW) has documented eight unmarked graves in Chechnya, all of which were discovered in 2000 and 2001; HRW has also documented eight cases in which dead bodies were simply dumped by roadsides, on hospital grounds or elsewhere. The Memorial Human Rights Center also has documented numerous cases. The majority of the bodies showed close-range bullet wounds, typical of extrajudicial summary executions, and signs of mutilation (examinations of some of these bodies by doctors have revealed that some of the mutilations were inflicted while the detainees were still alive, indicating that the victims were also severely tortured). On March 29, 2001, the UN High Commissioner for Human Rights (UNHCR), Mary Robinson, called for a thorough investigation of the mass grave sites in Chechnya. In a statement given to the 57th session of the UNHCR, Robinson stated that the mass graves "must be followed up and thoroughly investigated."

In 2003, residents and human rights campaigners alleged that fragments of blown-up bodies were being found all over the war-ruined region. The critics alleged that rather than put a stop to the human rights violations, the military appeared to be doing its best to hide them. Families were reported to be paying ransom to Russian troops for bodies. On March 31, 2003, the Russian government's human rights commissioner Oleg Mironov called on the authorities to open the mass burial sites in Chechnya to identify the bodies and establish the reasons for their deaths, "and then bury them as humans deserve." At the same time, Mironov rejected the proposal by Parliamentary Assembly of the Council of Europe (PACE) to establish an international tribunal to investigate alleged war crimes committed in Chechnya.

On June 16, 2005, the local pro-Russian government announced that there were 52 mass graves in Chechnya. The chairman of the Chechen government committee for civil rights, Nurdi Nukhazhiyev, was quoted by ITAR-TASS news agency as saying that the graves have not been opened, so the total number of dead was difficult to determine. By 2005, AI estimated that up to 5,000 people who had disappeared since 1999, out of the population of roughly one million, were still missing.

As of 2008, exhuming and identifying the bodies in almost 60 identified but unopened mass burial sites remains a problem. European human rights organizations are financing the construction of a laboratory to identify the bodies. It is not unusual for reconstruction crews in Grozny to run across collections of bodies, and some of them have been quietly moved to make room for the rebuilding. According to the pro-Moscow Chechen government, 4,825 people disappeared, without a trace, in the republic from 1994 to July 2008.

== Selected discoveries ==
(The dates often relate to the media reports, not the discoveries themselves.)

- February 2000: German N24 television company aired a video tape showing a mass grave of people said to be Chechens, many of whom appeared to be bound and tied at the ankles or wrapped in barbed wire and some to be mutilated (including one with his ear seemingly cut off). The footage also showed a dead Chechen dragged by a lorry truck across a field and Russian soldiers dumping a dead body from a tank. "I was shocked by what I saw," commented Alvaro Gil-Robles, the Council of Europe's human rights commissioner. Some Moscow officials argued that it showed the burial of rebels killed in fighting, rather than having been executed, some called it "propaganda and falsification" by the rebels, while still others said Russia opened an investigation regarding the circumstances of the Chechens' death.
- July 2000: The bodies of about 150 people were reported to have been found in a mass grave near the village of Tangi-Chu, Urus-Martanovsky District in southern Chechnya. People who happened to witness the exhumations claimed that the hands of the dead bodies had been tied with barbed wire. A pro-Moscow official stated that around half the bodies were of Chechen rebels as they had Chechen rebel uniforms on them. The rest were of civilians who "appeared to have no marks of violence on them".
- February 21, 2001: More than 50 (an official in pro-Moscow administration put the number at 80) bodies of men, women and children, showing signs of torture and military-style summary execution, were uncovered across the main Russian Khankala military base at the abandoned holiday settlement of Dachny (also called Zdorovye) near Grozny, sparking an international-scale scandal. Many were booby-trapped and some bore signs of mutilation including stab wounds, broken limbs, severed fingernails and dismembered ears, and many had their hands tied behind them and were blindfolded. The vast majority (16 out of 19) of the victims whose corpses were identified were last seen when Russian federal forces took them into their custody. Human rights groups suggested that Russian servicemen at the Khankala base used the Zdorovye dacha settlement as a disposal site for executed prisoners. Among the identified victims was the corpse of Nura Luluyeva, a Chechen woman who was later proven in the European Court of Human Rights (ECHR) to have been kidnapped and bludgeoned to death by the Russian servicemen in 2000. The authorities, who had strongly denied involvement in the deaths, had buried the rest of the bodies without prior notice and without performing adequate autopsies or collecting crucial evidence which could have helped in identifying the perpetrators. The HRW called the official investigation a "charade".
- April 10, 2001: Pro-Moscow Grozny mayor Beslan Gantamirov announced that 17 bodies with gunshot wounds had been discovered in the basement of a bombed-out dormitory next to Oktyabrskoye city district police station, manned by the OMON special police troops from Siberia's Khanty-Mansiysk. The next day Gantamirov announced that his report was false and there were no bodies found. When explaining his change of heart, Gantamirov said that he learned of the discovery from the same source as the Russian envoy to the region Viktor Kazantsev, who also first confirmed the find, but later denied it. The OMON officer in charge of the station claimed the unit had nothing to do with the disappearance of local residents, adding that mass graves in Chechnya are commonplace. In March 2005, one of the unit's officers, Sergey Lapin, was convicted for the torture of a Chechen man who remains missing. In June 2006, Memorial produced what it says is documentary evidence of a secret torture center in the basement of a former school for deaf children in the Oktyabrsokye district of Grozny, which the Russian police allegedly used to hold, torture and murder hundreds of people. The activists said they collected the evidence just in time before the building housing the cellar was demolished in what they said was a crude attempt at a cover-up.
- April 22, 2001: A Russian reconnaissance unit found the remains of at least 18 and as many as 30 people in a mass grave near a rough mountain road in southern Chechnya. According to a spokesman for the Kremlin aide Sergei Yastrzhembsky, the victims appeared to have been prisoners of war or kidnapping victims killed during the First Chechen War and all appeared to have been shot in the head and then beheaded.
- June 25, 2001: The remains of 10 men were uncovered in a ditch on the outskirts of Grozny, while 16 more corpses (two without heads) were found near the Russian military headquarters at Khankala just few days earlier.
- March 3, 2002: ABC reported that the Chechen rebels said they found a mass grave containing more than 20 bodies of civilians in a grain silo in the town of Argun, of whom they recovered three. Human rights groups said many civilians went missing there during the sweep operation three months earlier.
- April 9, 2002: A mass grave containing remains of about 100 people was found in a mountain cave in Achkhoy-Martanovsky District. Local people who discovered the grave, claimed on the basis of the examination of the skeletal remains that they were of children, all of them reportedly beheaded. General Vladimir Moltenskoi, who commanded combined federal forces in Chechnya, promptly announced the bodies might be of Russian soldiers captured by Chechen fighters in 1994-1996 and held in an alleged death camp. However, eyewitnesses say pork tins and bottles of vodka found on the spot prove roistering Russian soldiers stayed there. Local people also allege that, as early as in December 2000, several detainees, including children held during "mopping-up" operations, were held by the troops stationed in the area of the caves.
- September 8, 2002: Police from Ingushetia discovered a common grave near Goragorsk, on the border with neighboring Chechnya, containing the bodies of 15 ethnic Chechen men. Memorial claims that seven who were identified were last seen being taken into custody by the Russian troops at different times and in different places in May 2002. Russian authorities, however, claim that four of the victims were kidnapped by a Chechen rebel group. The grave was reportedly found after relatives of the victims bribed Russian soldiers for information.
- April 6, 2003: Police in Chechnya said they had discovered four graves filled with disfigured bodies over the past 24 hours. Chechnya's Emergency Situations Ministry claimed that three sites were found in the northern Nadterechny District, a relatively peaceful area of Chechnya. The heads and arms had been cut off of the corpses.
- October 8, 2004: A mass grave of three women, all of whom were killed by gunshot wounds to the head, was discovered in Grozny. The women were buried a few metres from buildings which housed Russian Federation forces in 2000–2001, and near a checkpoint manned by federal troops between 2000 and 2003.
- November 20, 2004: A mass grave containing the bodies of 11 unidentified young people, aged 12 to 20, was reportedly discovered near the Gudermessky District village of Jalka. Earlier same week, local residents discovered three male corpses in the vicinity of a dairy farm in the Grozny rural district; the bodies showed multiple signs of torture.
- April 2, 2006: The remains of 57 bodies were discovered in unmarked graves during unexploded ordnance and land mine disposal work in the Sergey Kirov Park in Grozny's Leninsky district. Valery Kuznetsov, Chechnya's prosecutor, claimed that an examination of the corpses buried in the unmarked graves indicated that they were "ordinary citizens" who had died from explosions of artillery shells and bombs during siege between 1999 and 2000; he added that there would be no investigations of the finding. Six bodies from that dig were never identified and were reburied in numbered graves. Local authorities planned to build a large entertainment center, to be named for Akhmad Kadyrov, on the site of the former Kirov Park, where nine other graves were uncovered in April–May 2000.
- June 27, 2006: The Federal Security Service's (FSB) branch for Chechnya said it has discovered a grave containing the bodies of nine federal soldiers and local supporters of the federal government executed by Chechen militants in 1996–1997.
- May 5, 2008: A Special Battalion Vostok serviceman revealed the location of a secret burial ground at the decommissioned Gudermes biochemical fertilizer plant, from which seven completely decomposed corpses were recovered. The next day, the man revealed the burial site of a Vostok officer Vakharsolt Zakayev, who was shot in 2003 on suspicion of having murdered Vostok commander Dzhabrail Yamadayev.
- June 21, 2008: A large burial site containing about 800 bodies was reported in the area of the Russian Orthodox cemetery in Grozny's Leninsky district. The bodies, mostly civilians but also some Chechen fighters and federal troops killed during the fighting for the city, had been reportedly first collected from the streets and ruins of Grozny by civilian volunteers and then recorded and buried there by the Russian military between January and October 1995. The authorities have confirmed that there is data on everyone buried in the grave, and the archive could establish their names.
- July 3, 2008: A suspected mass grave containing the bodies of around 250 to 300 people killed by federal artillery and tank fire in October 1999 was announced to have been discovered near the village of Goryachevodsk. Human rights groups and the media at the time reported the October 30, 1999 attack on a refugee convoy fleeing Grozny under white flags via the so-called "safe corridor" opened by the federal forces along the road between Goryachevodsk and the village of Petropavlovskaya. According to eyewitnesses, they decided to go public about the mass grave only after an official investigation of the mass grave in Grozny began in June, the wounded were finished off by sniper fire, and the bodies were then collected by the military and buried together with their smashed vehicles in an enormous pit on the grounds of an asphalt factory. Later the same month, a superficial survey of the incident site detected fragments of a passenger car and clothes, but the investigators decided not to dig deeper. According to Memorial, the people buried in the grave were exhumed by the organization already in early June 2000.
- March 27, 2009: Fellow-villagers of Elza Kungayeva, the victim of former Colonel Yuri Budanov, showed journalists a mass burial site in the village of Tanga-Chu. The collective grave holds the remains of 23 persons. Human rights ombudsman of the Chechen Republic Nurdi Nukhazhiev has reported that local residents assert that soldiers from Budanov's regiment were involved in the crimes.

== See also ==
- Filtration camp system in Chechnya
- Russian war crimes
