= Bradshaw and Others v. the United Kingdom =

Bradshaw v. the United Kingdom
- Court: European Court of Human Rights
- Full case name: Bradshaw and Others v. the United Kingdom
- Decided: 22 July 2025
- Citation: Application 15653/22, [2025] 81 E.H.R.R. 24

Court membership
- Judges sitting: Lado Chanturia; Jolien Schukking; Faris Vehabović; Tim Eicke; Lorraine Schembri Orland; Anne Louise Bormann; András Jakab
- Chief judge: Lado Chanturia

Keywords
- Freedom of expression; Margin of appreciation; National security; Foreign interference

Bradshaw v. the United Kingdom is a European Court of Human Rights case involving the United Kingdom. The applicants claimed Russia had engaged in interference with democratic elections across the UK and Council of Europe by using 'cyber troops' and 'troll farms'. The respondents had not investigated these allegations previously.

== Facts ==
The applicants were Ben Bradshaw MP, Caroline Lucas MP, and Alyn Smith MP. The respondents were the United Kingdom, with Sir James Eadie KC representing on behalf of the UK.

In 2019, the House of Commons Digital, Culture, Media and Sport Committee published a report regarding fake news and disinformation. A second report followed by the Intelligence and Security Committee, entitled "Russia", had been sent to the Prime Minister and was published in 2020. Both reports provided evidence of interference in the Scottish independence referendum, the European Union membership referendum, and the 2019 General Election. As a result, the applicants decided to challenge the Prime Minister, by judicial review, on his failings to direct an investigation into Russian interference. They argued the PM was obliged to direct an investigation as per Article 3 protocol 1 of the European Convention on Human Rights, and that the PM had failed to provide adequate framework to prevent interference and allow for free expression.

In 2021, the applicants' application for judicial review was refused in the High Court. The judge noted it would have touched the state's core functions and sovereignty. The judge also mentioned it is for the PM to decide whether an investigation should take place and not the courts. The applicants' sought to appeal this decision. However, this was refused by the Court of Appeal as there was no compelling reason to hear the appeal.

== Judgement ==
It was held unanimously that there was no violation of Article 3 protocol 1 in the circumstances of this case. There was found to be nothing in the Court's case law to imply any existence of an obligation to investigate claims of a breach of an individual's rights under Article 3.

== See also ==
- List of European Court of Human Rights judgments
