= Gennady Troshev =

Russian military leader (1947–2008)

Hero of the Russian Federation Gennady Troshev
- Геннадий Николаевич Трошев
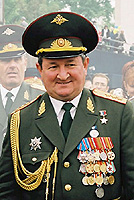
- Born: 14 March 1947; East Berlin, Allied-occupied Germany (Note: A section of Berlin and Germany was under Soviet occupation at the time of Troshev's birth.)
- Died: 14 September 2008 (aged 61); Perm, Russia
- Military career
- Allegiance: Soviet Union; Russia
- Service years: 1969–2002
- Rank: Colonel General
- Units: 58th Army; North Caucasus Military District
- Conflicts: First Chechen War; Invasion of Dagestan (1999); Second Chechen War
- Awards: Hero of Russia
- Other work: Advisor to the President of the Russian Federation for Cossacks affairs

Gennady Nikolayevich Troshev (Russian: Геннадий Николаевич Трошев; 14 March 1947 – 14 September 2008) was a Russian colonel general and a former commander of the North Caucasus Military District, including Chechnya, during the Second Chechen War. He was awarded a Hero of Russia award.

== Biography ==
=== Early years ===
Gennady Troshev was born in 1947 in the East Berlin, in the Soviet occupation zone, the son of a Soviet officer. He spent his childhood in the ethnic Russian community in Grozny in the Chechen-Ingush Republic.

=== Military career ===
In 1969, Troshev graduated from the Kazan Tank College, and later from the Tank Academy and from the Military Academy of the General Staff. After graduating from the tank college in 1969, Troshev served in Soviet tank forces. Troshev served as the commander of the 10th Guards Uralsko-Lvovskaya Tank Division, later - as the commander of the 42nd Army Corps. and as the commander of the joint group of federal forces in Chechnya during the First Chechen War. On 1 June 1995, Troshev was appointed commander of the 58th Army, and since 29 July 1997, he served as the deputy commander of the North Caucasus Military District. In April 2000, Troshev was appointed the commander of the joint group of federal forces in the Northern Caucasus.

During his career as a commander in Chechnya he gained notoriety after advocating public executions of separatist fighters. Human rights activists had accused him of tolerating rampant abuses in the war-ravaged republic. Early in the war he declared that the shattered city of Grozny should never be rebuilt so as to serve as a warning against "treason to Russia's ethnic minorities". He also publicly defended Yuri Budanov, who was on trial for the murder of an 18-year-old Chechen woman, Elza Kungayeva.

=== Post military career ===
Troshev publicly defied, on national television, Minister of Defense Sergei Ivanov's suggestion that he should relocate from Chechnya in the North Caucasus Military District to the command of the Siberian Military District. In response, President Vladimir Putin signed a decree dismissing Troshev from his post in 2002.

The Jamestown Foundation, a U.S. policy research organisation that studies Russian military affairs, said Ivanov's order that Troshev relocate to Siberia was "open to multiple and complex interpretations. One theory connects it to a broader reshuffling of personnel as major elections approach in Chechnya (and perhaps in response to the Moscow theater hostage crisis). A second explanation ties it to the stalled process of military-administrative reform."

After his sacking, Troshev was appointed an advisor to the President of the Russian Federation for Cossacks affairs.

=== Final years and death ===
From 2000 onwards Troshev worked as the civil service personnel and promoted a number of important legislative papers.

Troshev died on 14 September 2008. He was a passenger aboard Aeroflot Flight 821, which crashed and left no survivors. Russian officials have dismissed public suspicions that the plane might have been sabotaged.

One week after Troshev's death, the President of the Chechen Republic Ramzan Kadyrov renamed Krasnoznamennaya Street in Grozny after Troshev.

=== Military medals and ribbons ===
| Order of Military Merit |
| Order of Friendship of Peoples |
| Order for Service to the Homeland in the Armed Forces of the USSR 3rd class |
| Jubilee Medal "300 Years of the Russian Navy" |
| Medal of Zhukov |
| Jubilee Medal "In Commemoration of the 100th Anniversary since the Birth of Vladimir Il'ich Lenin" |
| Medal "Veteran of the Armed Forces of the USSR" |
| Jubilee Medal "50 Years of the Armed Forces of the USSR" |
| Jubilee Medal "60 Years of the Armed Forces of the USSR" |
| Jubilee Medal "70 Years of the Armed Forces of the USSR" |
| For Military Valour 1st Class (Ministry of Defence) |
| For Strengthening Military Cooperation (Ministry of Defence) |
| For Valour, silver (Ministry of Justice of Russia) |
| For Strengthening Military Cooperation (Ministry of Internal Affairs) |
| For Strengthening Military Cooperation (Federal Security Service of the Russian Federation) |
| For Participation in Counter-Terrorist Operation |
| Medal "For Impeccable Service" 1st class |
| Medal "For Impeccable Service" 2nd class |
| Medal "For Impeccable Service" 3rd class |

== See also ==
- List of Heroes of the Russian Federation
