= Sergey Lapin =

Sergey Lapin may refer to:

- Sergey Lapin (diplomat) (1912–1990), Soviet Union diplomat and politician
- Sergey Lapin (police officer), Russian police officer
