= Sergei Babin =

Russian police officer

- Citizenship: Saint Petersburg
- Occupation: police officer

Sergei Babin is a former Russian police officer who had served in the OMON (special police) detachment sent from Saint Petersburg and is an accused war criminal.

In early 2005 Babin was charged with the robbery and murder of an old man during the notorious Novye Aldi massacre near Grozny, Chechnya in February 2000. After this, Babin went into hiding and was put on the wanted list; later in 2005, the preliminary criminal case investigation was suspended on grounds of having to search for the accused.

Babin himself maintains he was part of an engineering squad sent to dismantle explosives and had served seven tours of duty in Chechnya without killing anyone. Many in the Russian anti-war movement believe he was chosen by the government as a scapegoat and there was a mass protest in support of Babin by the anti-government opposition in 2005.

== See also ==
- Sergey Lapin (police officer)
