= Musayev, Labazanova and Magomadov v. Russia =

European Court of Human Rights case

Decided 26 July 2007
- Full case name: Musayev, Labazanova and Magomadov v. Russia
- Case: 57941/00, 58699/00 and 60403/00
- ECLI: ECLI:CE:ECHR:2007:0726JUD005794100
- Chamber: First Section

Court composition
- President; C.L. Rozakis
- Judges: L. Loucaides; N. Vajić; A. Kovler; E. Steiner; K. Hajiyev; D. Spielmann

Musayev, Labazanova and Magomadov v. Russia was the July 26, 2007, ruling by the European Court of Human Rights (ECHR) in the case of the February 2000 Novye Aldi massacre in Chechnya, which unanimously held Russia responsible for violations of Articles 2 (right to life) and 13 (right to effective remedy) of the European Convention of Human Rights. The three applications, which the Court joined into one case, concerned the murders of 11 civilian persons committed during a rampage in the Chechen capital Grozny by the Russian OMON special police unit.

In its ruling, the Court said:

The killings had been committed in broad daylight and a large number of witnesses, including some of the applicants, had seen the perpetrators face to face. Their detailed accounts of the events had been made public by various sources. The relatives of the victims had demonstrated their willingness to cooperate with the authorities by allowing the exhumation and forensic analysis of the bodies and by forming an action group to coordinate their efforts. The injuries and the circumstances of the victims' deaths had been established with a sufficient degree of certainty. Numerous bullets and cartridges had been collected, some of them being suitable for identifying individual guns and even bearing serial numbers that allowed the origin of their production to be traced. Information about the alleged involvement of particular military units had been available to the prosecuting authorities no later than one month after the incident. Despite all that, and notwithstanding the domestic and international public outcry caused by the cold-blooded execution of more than 50 civilians, almost six years after the tragic events in Novye Aldy no meaningful result whatsoever had been achieved in the task of identifying and prosecuting the individuals who had committed the crimes. In the Court's view, the astonishing ineffectiveness of the prosecuting authorities in this case could only be qualified as acquiescence in the events.

== See also ==
- Estamirov and Others v. Russia
