= Estamirov and Others v. Russia =

Court case

Estamirov and Others v. Russia was a European Court of Human Rights ruling in the case of the February 5, 2000, Novye Aldi massacre in Chechnya, which unanimously held Russia responsible for violations of Articles 2 (right to life) and 13 (right to effective remedy) of the European Convention of Human Rights. The case was brought to the European Court by several members of the Estamirov family together with the British solicitor Gareth Peirce and the organization Russian Justice Initiative.

On October 12, 2006, the court held the Russian state responsible for the summary execution of five members of the Estamirov family in the Novye Aldi suburb of the Chechen capital Grozny, including a pregnant woman and a one-year-old child (the bodies were discovered the same day, burnt and with gunshot wounds). The court noted that the Russian government had not disputed that the area was controlled by Russian federal forces at the time, and the government did not provide any explanation for its assertion that these deaths were not linked to numerous other deaths in that area on that day. The Court noted that the investigation into the deaths had not been completed and that the individuals responsible were not identified or indicted; because of this and other shortcomings the Court found that the Russian state had also violated its obligation to conduct a proper investigation. It also expressed its dissatisfaction with the Russian government's refusal to disclose all documents concerning the investigation into the deaths.

== See also ==
- Musayev, Labazanova and Magomadov v. Russia
