= List of ECHR cases concerning existence of political parties =

== Chronological list ==
- 1957 — Communist Party of Germany, Reimann and Fisch v. Germany
- 1998 — United Communist Party of Turkey and Others v. Turkey
- 1998 — Socialist Party and Others v. Turkey
- 1999 — Freedom and Democracy Party (ÖZDEP) v. Turkey
- 2002 — Dicle for the Democratic Party (DEP) of Turkey v. Turkey
- 2002 — Yazar and Others v. Turkey
- 2003 — Socialist Party of Turkey (STP) and Others v. Turkey
- 2003 — Refah Partisi and Others v. Turkey
- 2004 — Gorzelik v. Poland
- 2004 — Vatan v. Russia
- 2004 — Presidential Party of Mordovia v. Russia
- 2005 — Partidul Comunistilor (Nepeceristi) and Ungureanu v. Romania
- 2005 — Democracy and Change Party and Others v. Turkey
- 2005 — United Macedonian Organisation Ilinden – PIRIN and Others v. Bulgaria
- 2005 — Emek Partisi v. Turkey
- 2006 — Fazilet Partisi and Kutan v. Turkey
- 2006 — Artyomov v. Russia
- 2007 — Demokratik Kitle Partisi and Elçi v. Turkey
- 2009 — Herri Batasuna and Batasuna v. Spain
- 2010 — HADEP and Demir v. Turkey
- 2011 — Republican party of Russia v. Russia
- 2013 — Eusko Abertzale Ekintza — Acción Nacionalista Vasca (EAE-ANV) v. Spain (No. 2) (application No. 40959/09)
- 2016 — Demokratik Toplum Partisi and 6 other applications v. Turkey (no. 3840/10)

== List by issue ==
=== Left-wing parties ===
- 1957 — Communist Party of Germany, Reimann and Fisch v. Germany
- 1998 — United Communist Party of Turkey and Others v. Turkey
- 2005 — Partidul Comunistilor (Nepeceristi) and Ungureanu v. Romania

=== Ethnic-based parties ===
- 2004 — Gorzelik v. Poland
- 2004 — Vatan v. Russia
- 2005 — United Macedonian Organisation Ilinden – PIRIN and Others v. Bulgaria
- 2006 — Artyomov v. Russia

=== Federalist and separatist parties ===
- 1998 — Socialist Party and Others v. Turkey
- 1999 — Freedom and Democracy Party (ÖZDEP) v. Turkey
- 2002 — Dicle for the Democratic Party (DEP) of Turkey v. Turkey
- 2002 — Yazar and others v. Turkey
- 2003 — Socialist Party of Turkey (STP) and Others v. Turkey
- 2005 — Democracy and Change Party and Others v. Turkey
- 2005 — Emek Partisi v. Turkey
- 2007 — Demokratik Kitle Partisi and Elçi v. Turkey
- 2009 — Herri Batasuna and Batasuna v. Spain
- 2010 — HADEP and Demir v. Turkey
- 2013 — Eusko Abertzale Ekintza — Acción Nacionalista Vasca (EAE-ANV) v. Spain (No. 2)
- 2016 — Demokratik Toplum Partisi and 6 other applications v. Turkey

=== Religious parties ===
- 2003 — Refah Partisi and Others v. Turkey
- 2006 — Fazilet Partisi and Kutan v. Turkey

=== Other issues ===
- 2004 — Presidential Party of Mordovia v. Russia
- 2011 — Republican party of Russia v. Russia
