= Reactions to the First Chechen War =

The First Chechen War began on 11 December 1994, with the Russian military launching an assault on Grozny, capital of the Chechen Republic of Ichkeria. Despite early diplomatic support from the United States and the European Union, Russia's position was undermined by war crimes committed in Chechnya, and both governmental and popular attitudes gradually shifted against Russia. Chechnya also found extensive popular support in the Muslim world and the former Eastern Bloc, and people from both regions on some occasions served alongside or in the Armed Forces of the Chechen Republic of Ichkeria.

== Governments ==
=== United States ===
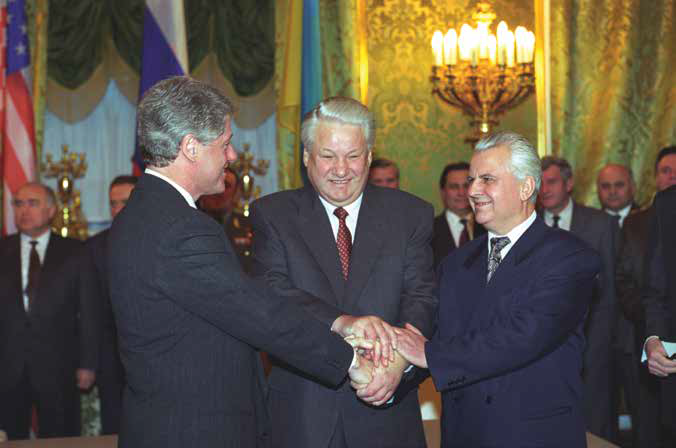
U.S. President Bill Clinton (left) supported the First Chechen War

The United States and its president at the time, Bill Clinton, initially pursued a relatively pro-Russian stance towards the war. In a defining moment of this early period, Mike McCurry, then White House Press Secretary, compared the Chechen War to the American Civil War. Bill Clinton also voiced similar position, saying that "I would remind you that we once had a civil war in our country... over the proposition that Abraham Lincoln gave his life for: That no state had a right to withdraw from our union". Over time, American policy changed to become more critical of Russia (particularly after the Samashki massacre), though Clinton refused to retract his support for Yeltsin. This position met with criticism from members of the U.S. Congress, particularly those from the Republican Party, who argued for conditioning American aid to Russia. On 21 April 1996, Bill Clinton reiterated his support for Boris Yeltsin's position that Chechnya "must and will remain part of Russia" and expressed his readiness to help to mediate the conflict.

=== European Union ===
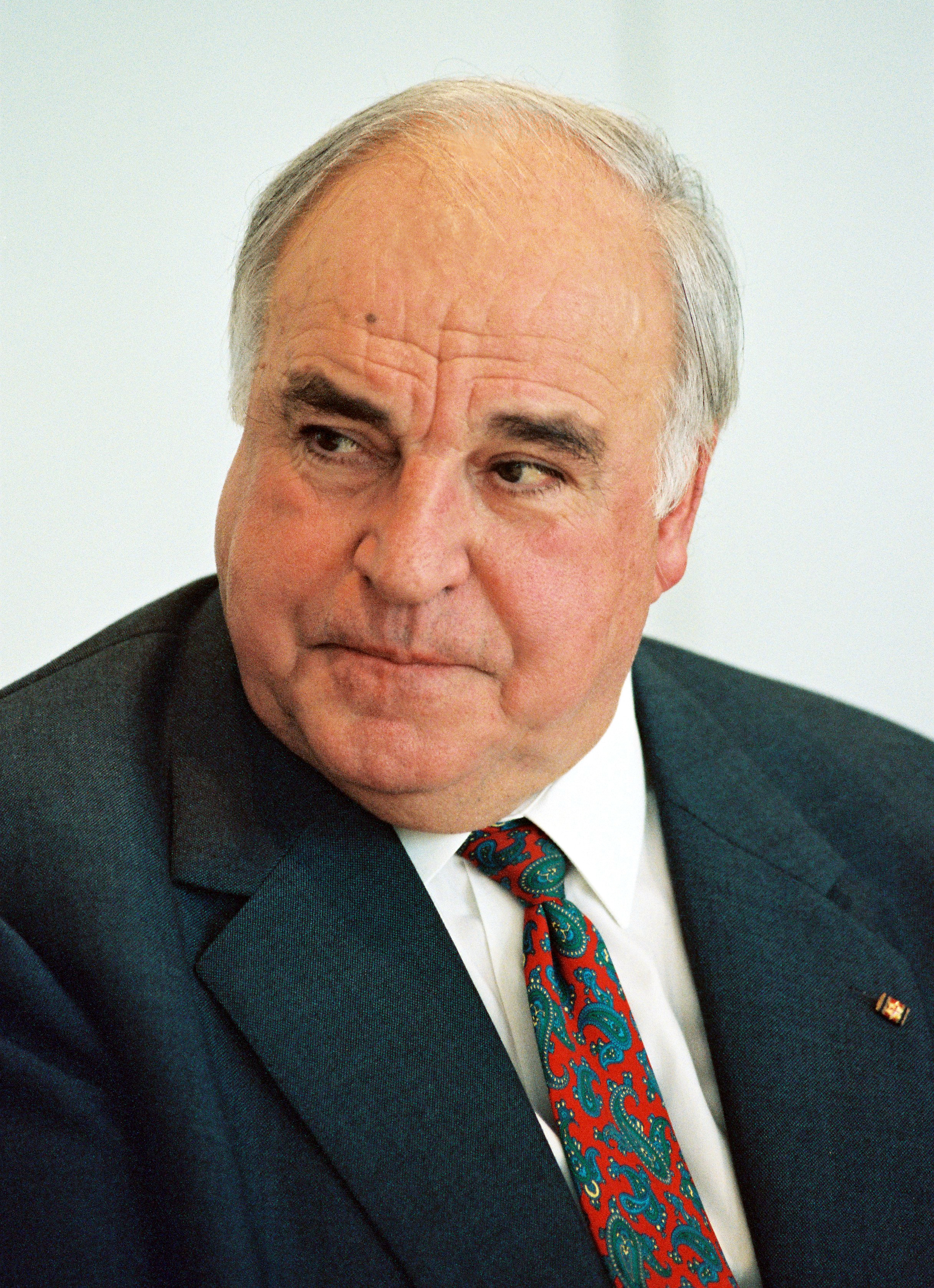
Helmut Kohl, Chancellor of Germany, was one of the European Union's most supportive members of Russia during the war

Like the United States, European Union members followed a generally pro-Russian policy, though some countries (France and the Nordic countries in particular) were more critical towards Russia. In response to the beginning of the First Chechen War, Russia's application to the Council of Europe was paused on 2 February 1995. However, European political structures continued to engage with Russia despite this, including the formulation of a Partnership and Cooperation Agreement (PCA) between the European Union and Russia and the reopening of Russia's Council of Europe application on 26 September 1995. The EU–Russia PCA was met with controversy, with Denmark stating its refusal to sign the agreement while the war was ongoing. Scandinavian countries pushed for sanctions, but to no avail.

Alongside the United States, Germany (in particular, Chancellor Helmut Kohl and Vice-Chancellor Klaus Kinkel) proved to be among Yeltsin's strongest foreign supporters. Kohl was criticised by members of his Christian Democratic Union party for his stance towards the war, and Volker Rühe, Germany's minister of defence, refused to meet with Russian defence minister Pavel Grachev, saying that the latter would be unwelcome in Germany.

=== Former Eastern Bloc ===
In contrast to the United States and the European Union, Eastern European countries formerly belonging to the Soviet Union and Warsaw Pact offered substantial diplomatic support for Chechnya. In particular, the Baltic states and Poland signified their support for Chechnya, with the latter refusing to refer to Chechen forces as "separatists" at the Council of Europe and allowing members of the Chechen government to take part in conferences in Poland. Polish political leaders also publicly expressed their support for Chechen independence. In Estonia, a symbolic motion to recognise Chechnya as independent passed unanimously in the Riigikogu; in Latvia, the Saeima accused Russia of committing genocide in Chechnya; in Lithuania, 46 of the country's 56 municipalities delivered a letter to the Seimas calling on them to recognise Chechen independence. Ukraine was also sharply critical of Russian activities during the war, with some People's Deputies of Ukraine unsuccessfully seeking Ukrainian recognition for Chechnya. In Kazakhstan, the war was met with concerns regarding the stability of the former Soviet Union as a whole.

=== Muslim world ===
Two major nations of the Islamic world, Iran and Turkey, were significantly affected by the First Chechen War. In the former country, policy was shaped by friendly Iran–Russia relations, including cooperation on oil exploitation in the Caspian Sea and Russian support for the nuclear program of Iran. As a result, despite popular support for Chechnya, Iranian governmental support for Chechnya was limited. Nonetheless, Iranian President Akbar Hashemi Rafsanjani expressed the opinion that continued violence in Chechnya would threaten Iran–Russia relations, and Iran's foreign minister, Ali Akbar Velayati requested that the Organisation of Islamic Cooperation discuss Chechnya with Russian officials.

Conversely, in Turkey, the government reaction was shaped by the Kurdish–Turkish conflict and concerns about instability in the Caucasus. Despite such concerns, however, the Turkish government allowed the nationalist Grey Wolves organisation to deliver military equipment to Chechen forces. Another nation, Saudi Arabia, made significant donations to Chechen nationalists and Islamists.

On 27 December 1994, Saudi Arabia and the 51-member Organization of Islamic Conference issued statements, expressing concern over the fighting in Chechnya and calling for a peaceful resolution of the conflict. Fahd of Saudi Arabia called for a halt in the fighting. Hamid Algabid, chairman of OSC, said that "Muslims throughout the world were following with anxiety the developments in Chechnya" and expressed hope that "the basic rights of the Muslims in Chechnya will be taken into consideration". Algabid urged Russia and Chechnya to seek peaceful and negotiated settlement.

Russia accused Turkey, Pakistan and other Muslim-majority countries of aiding the Chechen rebels.

== Non-governmental organisations ==
Russia's role in the First Chechen War was condemned by the Organisation of Islamic Cooperation, as well as by the International Court of Justice, which used its powers to a previously unseen extent in an effort to shift American and European Union policy towards the war, prevent Russia from joining the Council of Europe, and encourage the United States to freeze a $6.8 billion loan from the International Monetary Fund until the war's conclusion. Human Rights Watch also condemned the violence, accusing both Russian and Chechen forces of violating people's human rights.

== Popular response ==
In contrast to a muted response from governments, popular support was broadly in favour of Chechnya, particularly in the Muslim world and the former Eastern Bloc. Public protests throughout the Muslim world in support of Chechnya were frequent, including in Pakistan, Egypt and Libya, among other countries. In Europe, former Polish president Lech Wałęsa called on other laureates of the Nobel Peace Prize to condemn the war, while Ukrainian journalists delivered medical aid to Chechnya amidst the failure of the International Committee of the Red Cross and the Ministry of Emergency Situations of Russia to do the same.

=== Foreign volunteers for Chechnya ===
The Armed Forces of the Chechen Republic of Ichkeria was supported by international volunteers during the conflict. Chechens in Turkey volunteered to fight on Chechnya's behalf, as did soldiers from Abkhazia and the Confederation of Mountain Peoples of the Caucasus. The Ukrainian National Assembly – Ukrainian People's Self-Defence also participated in the conflict, under the Oleksandr Muzychko-led "Viking Brigade" (which, despite its name, consisted of around 200 men). This proved to be a sticking point in Russia–Ukraine relations for years after the event. Ukrainian nationalist figures Dmytro Korchynsky, Anatolii Lupynis, and Arseniy Yatsenyuk have been targeted by Russia for their alleged role in UNSO activities during the war. Other volunteers from Belarus, Poland, the Baltic states (especially Lithuania), Georgia (among loyalists to ex-president Zviad Gamsakhurdia), and Azerbaijan (from the Grey Wolves) also fought on the side of Chechnya, with the lattermost country being accused by Russia of sending an army contingent. This accusation led to a temporary closure of the Azerbaijan–Russia border, but was later stated to be unrealistic; Russian ambassador to Azerbaijan Valter Shoniya stated that any Azerbaijani military presence would go to Nagorno-Karabakh before the country involved itself in foreign military conflicts.

== Internal reactions ==
President of Ingushetia Ruslan Aushev called the Russia's military actions "outrageous", noting that "there are no political problems in our fatherland that cannot be solved by peaceful political means". North Ossetia, on the other hand, adopted pro-Moscow line, with President of North Ossetia Akhsarbek Galazov saying that the leaders of other Caucasian republics have "no moral right to interfere into the conflict". However, both leaders called the Russian authorities to "have a well-thought out policy for the Caucasus".
