= Disappearance of Zelimkhan Murdalov =

Disappearance of Russian student

Zelimkhan Murdalov
- Born: Zelimkhan Murdalov; 1975
- Disappeared: 2 January 2001 (aged 26) at a police station in Grozny, Chechnya
- Status: Missing for 25 years, 2 months and 2 days
- Father: Astemir Murdalov

Zelimkhan Murdalov was a student from Grozny, Chechnya, who left his home on 2 January 2001, saying he would return but never did. His parents tracked him down at the police station, where an official promised that he would soon be released, but they have not seen their son since. According to witnesses, Murdalov was subsequently severely tortured while in police custody. His case was first brought to the public prominence by the September 2001 Novaya Gazeta article "The Disappearance" by Anna Politkovskaya.

== Background ==
On 7 January 2001, a criminal investigation was opened into Murdalov's disappearance. The investigation found that on 3 January 2001, Murdalov was taken into a cell in the district police of Oktyabrsky district of Grozny by former OMON officer Sergei Lapin and another unidentified official; there Lapin had beaten Murdalov with a truncheon and subjected him to electric shock treatment. Witnesses told the court that while in the cell, Murdalov could hardly stand and lost consciousness several times; his arm was broken, his ear was torn, and he had received a concussion. The next day, Lapin and some colleagues took Murdalov out of the cell; since then his fate and whereabouts remain unknown. It emerged in court that he was tortured in detention in an attempt to turn him into an informant. In 2005 and again in 2007, Lapin was sentenced to prison for the torture of Zelimkhan Murdalov.

== Disappearance and aftermath ==
According to Amnesty International Zelimkhan Murdalov is one of thousands of people who have become victims of forced disappearances in Chechnya. Virtually none of the investigations have produced any results, and relatives seeking justice often face reprisals and intimidation.

== See also ==
- List of people who disappeared mysteriously (2000–present)
