= Ferrazzini =

European Court of Human Rights judgement

Ferrazzini v. Italy (Application no. 44759/98) is a landmark judgment delivered by the Grand Chamber of the European Court of Human Rights on 12 July 2001, which addressed whether tax proceedings fall under the scope of "civil rights and obligations" guaranteed by the first paragraph of Article 6 of the European Convention on Human Rights.

The applicant, Giorgio Ferrazzini, an Italian citizen, complained about the excessive length of three sets of tax proceedings concerning property tax and corporate tax assessments between 1987 and 1993.The Court had to determine if tax disputes, which are inherently disputes between a citizen and the state acting in its sovereign capacity, constitute a "civil" right, thus allowing the applicant to claim a violation of the right to a fair trial within a "reasonable time".

By a 11–6 vote, the Grand Chamber held that Article 6 § 1 was not applicable to the case, and therefore, there was no violation.

The Court reasoned that tax matters belong to the "hard core of public-authority prerogatives," with the public law nature of the relationship between the taxpayer and the tax authority remaining predominant. The Court emphasized that tax obligations are not "civil" in nature.

This ruling established a clear limitation on the applicability of Article 6 to tax proceedings, distinguishing them from other financial disputes that directly affect civil rights.
