= Yuri Budanov =

Russian military officer and criminal (1963–2011)

- Budanov in the courtroom on his trial
- Born: 24 November 1963; Khartsyzk, Ukrainian SSR, Soviet Union
- Died: 10 June 2011 (aged 47); Moscow, Russia
- Cause of death: Assassination by gunshot
- Military career
- Allegiance: Russia
- Branch: Armoured Troops of the Russian Ground Forces
- Service years: 1987 – 2003
- Rank: Guards Colonel (stripped)
- Units: 160th Guards Tank Regiment
- Conflicts: First Chechen War, Second Chechen War
- Awards: (stripped)

Yuri Dmitrievich Budanov (Russian: Ю́рий Дми́триевич Буда́нов, IPA: [ˈjʉrʲɪj ˈdmʲitrʲɪjɪvʲɪdʑ bʊˈdanəf]; 24 November 1963 – 10 June 2011) was a Russian military officer convicted for the kidnapping and murder of Elza Kungayeva in Chechnya.

Budanov was highly controversial in Russia: despite the conviction, Budanov enjoyed widespread support of Russian households as polled by public opinion. At the same time, he was broadly hated in Chechnya, even by the pro-Russian Chechens. In December 2008, a court in the south Russian Ulyanovsk Oblast granted a petition for early release. After eight years in prison (of the ten years he was sentenced), he was released on parole on 15 January 2009.

On 10 June 2011, Budanov was shot dead in Moscow.

== Biography ==
=== Early life ===
Budanov was born in 1963 in Khartsyzk, Ukrainian SSR, Soviet Union. He graduated from the Tank Military School in Kharkiv and went on officer career in the Soviet Army, particularly, serving with the Soviet base (Southern Group of Forces) in Hungary.

At the fall of the Soviet Union, Budanov was serving in Belarus, but he refused Belarusian citizenship and was transferred to the Siberian Military District, where he appears to have commanded the 160th Guards Tank Regiment of the 5th Guards Tank Division 1999–2001, and then to Chechnya. In 1999 Budanov graduated from the Malinovsky Military Armored Forces Academy, receiving the rank of Guards Colonel.

=== Chechen war ===
As noted in his later murder trial by Dr. Stuart Turner, Royal College of Psychiatrists in London, Budanov participated in a military operation in the Argun River gorge in January 2000, where more than half of his regiment officers were killed, supposedly from sniper fire.

He was home for a leave in February 2000, where he talked about the killed officers in the Argun River gorge with his family, showed photographs of the fallen, looked nervous, depressive (from Stuart Turner expertise).

=== Elza Kungaeva's murder ===
The father of Elza Kungayeva reported that Budanov had been encamped with his tank regiment outside the village of Tangi-Chu in the Urus-Martanovsky District of the Chechen Republic since February 2000. He had gained a notorious reputation amongst villagers, having conducted arbitrary searches and looting of several homes ten days prior to the murder. Two days before the incident, he also reportedly looted and threatened to set fire to other homes.

On March 27, 2000, Russian forces stormed the Kungayev family home in Tangi-Chu. Budanov and three soldiers took Elza Kungayeva (who went by Kheda), the eldest daughter, out of the house and drove her away in an armored personnel carrier. Villagers then traveled to nearby Urus-Martan to search for her, and were told by a federal commander that Kungayeva had been raped and killed by drunken men.

From 2001 to 2003, Russian courts tried Budanov, charged with kidnapping, rape, and murder of Kungayeva. The rape allegation was later withdrawn by the prosecution despite the indication of an initial autopsy report. From the start, Budanov confessed to the slaying but denied the rape (which can be considered more dishonorable than murder in Chechen culture). He said he was interrogating Kungayeva in his tent, believing that she was a sniper who had been shooting at his troops, and killed her in a fit of rage when she insulted him.

== Prosecution ==
=== Arrest ===
Budanov was arrested on 29 March 2000. According to press reports, Budanov claimed that Kungayeva was a suspected sniper, and that he had gone into a rage while questioning her.

Colonel-General Anatoly Kvashnin, then chief of the General Staff of the Armed Forces of the Russian Federation, appeared on national television to announce to President Vladimir Putin and the nation the arrest of Budanov in the grisly case. Kvashnin accused Budanov of "humiliating" and murdering Kungayeva, and denounced the colonel's behavior as "barbaric and "disgraceful."

In a stark contrast, Lieutenant-General Vladimir Shamanov, who was Budanov's commanding officer, exhibited strong sympathy towards him. He said that Budanov was one of his best commanders and offered this challenge: "To [Budanov's] enemies I say: Don't put your paws on the image of a Russian soldier and officer."

The Chechen rebels offered to exchange nine recent OMON special police captives for Budanov. After the Russian side refused the offer, the prisoners were executed on the morning of 4 April 2000.

=== Charges ===
In relation to the case of Kungayeva, Budanov was charged with three crimes: kidnapping resulting in death, abuse of office accompanied by violence with serious consequences, and murder of an abductee. No charges have been brought expressly for the beating and torture Kungaeva endured prior to her death. He was also charged in the beating up of a subordinate officer, threatening superior officers with a weapon, and other crimes.

Budanov used his official position and a combat vehicle to remove Kungayeva from her home, and detained Kungayeva at a military installation; he was thus charged with exceeding his official position with violence resulting in serious consequences, which is punishable by three to ten years of imprisonment (article 286.3 of the criminal code).

=== Lack of a rape prosecution ===
The forensic physician, a Captain in the Russian military medical service, found three tears in her hymen and one in the mucous membrane of her rectum, and the report concludes that she was penetrated anally and vaginally by a blunt object before death.

Three of Budanov's subordinates, Sergeants Li En Shou and Grigoriev and a Private Yegorev, were found responsible. Charges against all three were simultaneously brought and dropped under the 26 May 2000 amnesty law.

=== Trial ===
The trial began on 9 April 2003, in Rostov-on-Don. Legal proceedings against Budanov, who underwent several retrials, lasted a total of 2 years and 3 months.

Witnesses included Yahyayev, the person in the town administration, who according to Budanov had given him the picture representing Chechen snipers. However, Yahyayev said he had given no such picture to Budanov. General Shamanov came to defend Budanov during trial. He expressed his solidarity with the defendant, as did Colonel-General Gennady Troshev and numerous other Russian soldiers and civilians who picketed the court. According to a poll, 50% of the Russians asked supported the demands of picketers to release Colonel Budanov from custody; 19% did not support these demands.

In a controversial decision, Budanov was initially found not guilty by reason of temporary insanity on 31 December 2002, and committed to a psychiatric hospital for further evaluation and the length of the treatment would have been decided by his doctor.

However, in the beginning of March 2003 the supreme court invalidated the sentence and ordered a new trial. This took place in the same place but with a new judge. The sentence of 10 years of imprisonment was given on 25 July 2003.

The judge who convicted Budanov, Vladimir Bukreyev, himself was convicted of bribe-taking and sentenced to 10 years of imprisonment on 6 July 2009.

== In prison and release ==
On 21 September 2004, Shamanov, now the Ulyanovsk regional governor, signed a pardon for Budanov. Interfax quoted the head of the Ulyanovsk pardons commission, Anatoly Zherebtsov, as saying that if Putin backed the recommendation, Budanov would also get back his military rank and awards.

The commission's decision sparked outrage in Chechnya. "Whether in jail or freed, Budanov will remain a person who has committed a grave crime, which took the life of an innocent girl," Taus Dzhabrailov, the head of Chechnya's parliament, told Interfax. Ramzan Kadyrov said: "The Ulyanovsk commission's decision is like spitting on the soul of the long-suffering Chechen people."

Kadyrov made statements that "If any of Elza's friends should meet [Budanov] I don't want to predict how they will act. The Chechen people do not consider him to be a human being, and as a war criminal, he does not deserve to be. One might be able to forgive his crime to some extent if he had killed a man. But to sexually assault a girl cannot be forgiven. He is beneath contempt. He has brought shame on the Ministry of Defense of the Russian Federation."

In February 2006, a Russian prison official announced that Budanov, who was serving his 10-year sentence, might be released early on good behaviour. The Chechen regional branch of the United Russia party addressed the State Duma and the Russian president with a request not to grant amnesty to Budanov. The same month Budanov was removed from the strict custody colony to a settlement-colony, on the petition of Budanov's attorney, with account of good behaviour.

On 24 December 2008, a court granted him a release on parole. This was the fifth attempt by Budanov's lawyers to obtain him a release on parole. Four applications before that were rejected. Victim's lawyers appealed to overturn the decision (thus the delay in release), without success. Budanov was released on 15 January 2009, 15 months before completion of his conviction term. The decision was protested by Chechnya's human rights ombudsman, Nurdi Nukhazhiyev, who accused Russian judges of "double standards" with regard to Russians and Chechens.

The lawyer for the Kungayeva family, Stanislav Markelov, who had attempted a last-minute appeal against the release of Budanov, was shot dead in Moscow on 19 January 2009 along with Anastasia Baburova, a 25-year-old journalist for Novaya Gazeta.

== Assassination and funeral ==
Yuri Budanov was assassinated around 11:30 on 10 June 2011 in central Moscow (Hamovniki, Komsomolski prospekt). Six silenced shots were fired, four of which struck Budanov in the head. The killer escaped in a car driven by an accomplice. The car was found partially burned several blocks away. A gun believed to be a Makarov PM was found with a silencer inside the car. Budanov's wife witnessed the assassination and was held by Russian authorities. Russian police investigators commented that the attack was carefully planned and they considered blood revenge as one of the likely motives. One witness to the murder described the driver of the car from which the six shots were fired as being of Slavic appearance.

His funeral was attended by right-wing leaders such as Vladimir Zhirinovsky and included a three-gun salute. The Moscow police is reported to have made a dozen arrests, immediately before closing most of the investigation to the press.

On 7 May 2013, Yusup Temerkhanov was convicted by a jury of Budanov's murder and sentenced to 15 years of imprisonment. According to investigation, Temerkhanov's motive was revenge for his father, who was killed in 2000 during the Second Chechen War by Russian troops who refused to pay for their food in his restaurant. Temerkhanov's defense lawyer, Murad Musayev, was charged with trying to bribe two jury members to find his client not guilty. The charges against Musayev were dropped in February 2015 due to statute of limitations.

Two jury members in question, Diana Lomonosova and Vitali Pronin, were charged with taking that bribe of 6,000,000 rubles. Pronin plead guilty to the charges during his trial. Lomonosova was amnestied on 28 April 2015 due to being older than 50. Pronin was sentenced to a suspended sentence of one year and immediately amnestied on 5 May 2015.

Temerkhanov denied any involvement and pleaded not guilty. He died while serving his sentence in a penal colony in Siberia in August 2018. Chechnya president Ramzan Kadyrov said that Mr Temerkhanov had been tried and imprisoned illegally due to anti-Chechen bias of Russian law enforcement.

== See also ==
- Alexander Ivanovich Baranov
- Second Chechen War crimes and terrorism
