= Killing of Elza Kungayeva =

2000 murder during the Second Chechen War

- Location: Chechnya
- Date: 27 March 2000; 26 years ago
- Attack type: Kidnapping, battery, homicide
- Deaths: 1
- Victim: Elza Kungayeva
- Perpetrator: Yuri Budanov

Elza Kungayeva (Russian: Эльза Кунгаева; also known as Kheda Kungayeva, alternatively spelled Kungaeva; 1982 – 27 March 2000) was an 18-year-old Chechen woman abducted, beaten, murdered, and raped by Russian Army Colonel Yuri Budanov during the Second Chechen War.

On March 27, 2000, Elza Kungayeva was forcibly taken from her home in Chechnya, abused and murdered. On February 28, 2001, the Rostov District Military Court began the trial of Col. Yuri Budanov for Kungayeva's murder. It was one of the first cases in which Russian authorities promptly and publicly acknowledged a war crime perpetrated by Russian forces against civilians in Chechnya.

== Overview ==
On the night of March 26–27 at about 1 a.m., the commander of division 13206 Colonel Y.D. Budanov arrived in the village of Tangi-Chu in the Urus-Martan district of the Chechen Republic on armored personnel carrier (APC) no. 391 together with servicemen Sergeant Grigoriev, Sergeant Li-En-Shou, and Private Yegorov. On the orders of Col. Budanov, his subordinates forcibly took citizen Elza Kungayeva from house no.7 on Zarechni Lane and drove her to the division's encampment on the APC. Around 3 a.m. Budanov strangled Kungayeva in trailer 131 that was allegedly Budanov's quarters. On the orders of Col. Budanov, Pvt. Yegorov, Sgt. Li-En-Shou and Sgt. Grigoriev took the body of Kungayeva and buried her in a forested area near the encampment. Around 10 a.m. on March 28, 2000, Kungayeva's body was exhumed.

A forensic medical report, a copy of which was obtained by Human Rights Watch (HRW), cited a military procurator's report that on March 27 at 1 a.m., Budanov took Elza Kungayeva, a civilian, from her home in Tangi-Chu and brought her to a military encampment. The forensic examiner concluded that Kungayeva was beaten with a hard object, and strangled at about 3 a.m. The report cited marks on her neck, the condition of her blood vessels, the tone of her skin, and the condition of her lungs. It found that other injuries such as bruising found on her face, her neck, her right eye, and her left breast were inflicted by a blow with a "blunt, hard object of limited surface," which occurred approximately one hour before her death.

Russian military authorities first publicly accused Budanov of murdering Kungayeva, torturing and subsequently indicted him only on charges of murder, kidnapping, and abuse of office, in which he was accused of using torture.

== The events of March 27 ==
Visa Kungayev, Elza Kungayeva's father, said that between midnight and 1 a.m. on March 27, 2000, a loud noise woke the Kungayeva family. An armored personnel carrier (APC) drove up to their house on the outskirts of the village of Tangi-Chu, carrying three Russian soldiers, and their commander, Colonel Budanov. Kungayev warned his five children and went to his brother's nearby home to seek help.

According to the Kungayev family, armed soldiers entered the Kungayev house. Budanov stood in the corridor while two soldiers entered the bedroom and others guarded the house. First they brought Kungayev's younger daughter, Khava, out of the room, but when she screamed, Budanov reportedly said, "Let her go, take that one." The soldiers then brought out the eldest daughter, Elza, took her outside, and drove her away in the APC. Visa Kungayev then returned to his house, only to be told by his children that Elza Kungayeva had been taken by the soldiers. Kungayev's brother, a neighbor, said the APC bore the number 391. Many have reported that Budanov was drunk at the time.

Later on March 27, a group of villagers obtained permission from local Russian forces to travel to Urus-Martan, seven kilometers away, to search for Kungayeva. They believed she might have been taken to one of two detention facilities run by federal forces in that town. Two witnesses told Human Rights Watch that a federal commander in Urus-Martan told the villagers that Kungayeva had been raped by drunken men and was dead.

== Aftermath ==
The military responded immediately to Kungayeva's murder, promptly taking Budanov into custody, and assisting the Kungayeva family; they also condemned Budanov at the highest levels, without awaiting the outcome of a court proceeding. Federal soldiers returned Kungayeva's body to her family on the evening of March 28, 2000, Major-General Alexander Verbitskii told villagers that Budanov had raped and then strangled Kungayeva, and promised that justice would be severe and swift. Budanov told the court he believed that Kungayeva was a Chechen sniper and that a fit of rage had come over him as he interrogated her.

Top Russian military officials in the Chechnya war attended Kungayeva's funeral on March 29, 2000, including Colonel-General Valery Baranov, acting commander of the United Group of Forces in Chechnya at the time, Maj.-Gen. Valery Gerasimov, acting commander of the Western Group of Forces, and his deputy, Maj.-Gen. Verbitskii. Kungayev said that the generals were very helpful, paid for the funeral, asked for his forgiveness, and expressed sympathy.

=== Official investigation ===
Visa Kungayev told Human Rights Watch that initially the investigation seemed satisfactory. He reported meeting with investigators in Tangi-Chu and in Urus-Martan and reported that investigators also questioned family members and villagers. Kungayev's lawyer said that the investigation established that no members of the Kungayeva family were fighters. However, after six months had passed, Kungayev worried that the investigation had stalled, and sent petitions to the federal military procuracy, the general procuracy, and the Duma, expressing concern about the apparent halt to the investigation and urging that it continue. In October 2000, Kungayev learned that the charges against Budanov did not include rape, and became especially concerned about the investigation at that point.

When he spoke with HRW in early February 2001, after authorities had closed the investigation, Kungayev expressed shock and regret that Budanov had not been charged with rape. "They took away the most important charge," he said. Kungayeva's reaction to the failure to prosecute the rape of his daughter may reflect the view common in Chechnya that rape ruins the honor not only of the victim but of her extended family. For this reason, rape is considered by some a crime worse than murder.

Budanov was convicted of kidnapping, murder, and abuse of power and sentenced to 10 years in prison for the murder of Elza Kungayeva. He was also stripped of his military rank and his Order of Courage. In January 2009, Budanov was released early from jail—a move that angered human rights activists.

== Murder of Kungayeva family's attorney ==
On January 19, 2009, the attorney for the Kungayev family, Stanislav Markelov, was shot and killed when leaving a press conference he held in Moscow. Yuri Budanov was released in mid-January, 15 months earlier than his original release date, and Markelov announced at the press conference that he planned to file an appeal to keep Budanov in prison. A freelance journalist with Novaya Gazeta, Anastasia Baburova, was also killed with Markelov. A criminal investigation found that the murders were associated with Markelov's prosecutions of neo-Nazis.

== Murder of Yuri Budanov ==
On June 10, 2011, Yuri Budanov, the man convicted of Elza Kungayeva's murder, was shot dead in central Moscow by an unidentified assailant as he left a notary office on Komsomolsky Prospekt, a busy avenue in the capital. Budanov had been released from prison 17 months earlier, in a move that angered human rights activists. Police said his killer and an accomplice fled in a Mitsubishi Lancer, which was later found less than a kilometer away from the crime scene. A pistol and silencer had been left inside the vehicle. A police source said the killing was “obviously a contract hit.”

On 7 May 2013, Yusup Temerkhanov was convicted by a jury of Budanov's murder and sentenced to 15 years of imprisonment. According to investigation, Temerkhanov's motive was revenge for his father, who was killed in 2000 during the Second Chechen War. Temerkhanov denied any involvement and pleaded not guilty. He died while serving his sentence in a penal colony in Siberia in August 2018.

== See also ==
- Khadzhi-Murat Yandiev
- List of kidnappings (2000–2009)
- Nura Luluyeva
