= Death of Nura Luluyeva =

2000 murder of Chechen woman

- Location: Grozny, Chechnya, Russia (kidnapping)
- Date: 3 June 2000; 26 years ago (kidnapping)
- Attack type: Kidnapping, murder, enforced disappearance
- Victim: Nura Luluyeva
- Perpetrator: Russian death squad

Nura Luluyeva (Chechen: Нура Лулуева; 1960 – 2000) was a Chechen woman who was kidnapped and murdered by a Russian death squad in 2000.

== Abduction ==
On the morning of 3 June 2000, Nura Luluyeva, an unemployed nurse and kindergarten teacher and the mother of four children (ages 6–21), was selling strawberries on Mozdokskaya Street of Grozny, the capital of Chechnya, with her cousins Markha Gakayeva (b. 1962) and Raisa Gakayeva (b. 1964). A group of armed men in ski masks raided the marketplace on top of an armoured personnel carrier with a hull number 110; their leader told a witness that he was from the FSB and some of "their guys" have been killed there. The servicemen detained Luluyeva along with her two cousins, two other women, and at least one other person. A local policeman, trying to stop them, got into a heated argument and was fired on before the APC drove away with the detainees.

Luluyeva and her cousins "disappeared". A search by her husband Said-Alvi Luluyev, a former Soviet-era judge from Gudermes, did not bring any results, despite him contacting authorities from different ministries at various levels, petitioning, and even personally looking for her in detention centres and prisons in Chechnya and beyond in North Caucasus. There was also no official record of any operation conducted on Mozdokskaya Street on that day. The market was looted and destroyed in a raid by armored vehicles in November 2000, after a total of 18 Russian servicemen were reportedly either killed or kidnapped there since March 2000.

== Discovery ==
In February 2001, eight months after the abduction and shortly after the official investigation was "suspended for lack of information", the bodies of the missing women were discovered among some 60 mostly disfigured corpses uncovered from a dumping ground in an abandoned Zdorovye dacha summer house settlement located in the vicinity of Khankala, the main Russian military base in Chechnya outside Grozny. Many of the cadavers found there were blindfolded and had their arms bound behind their backs; some of the bodies were missing ears and showing signs of torture, and several were booby-trapped.

As the bodies of Nura Luluyeva and her cousins were in an advanced stage of decomposition, they could be identified only by their earrings and clothes. An autopsy of Luluyeva showed that she died from a multiple strong blows to the head with a solid blunt object at least three months before the discovery of the corpse-dumping site. Her body was then taken to be buried in her home village.

== International hearing ==
On 10 November 2006, in the case of Luluyev and Others v. Russia, the European Court of Human Rights found that Russia had violated the European Convention on Human Rights on five separate counts: right to life, right to effective investigation, prohibition of inhuman or degrading treatment (applicants), right to liberty and security, right to an effective remedy. In the judgement, the Court announced that it "could not but conclude that Nura Luluyeva was apprehended and detained by [unidentified] state servicemen. There existed a body of evidence that attained the standard of proof "beyond reasonable doubt", which made it possible to hold the state authorities responsible for Nura Luluyeva's death." However, "the description of the injuries found on her body by the forensic experts did not permit the Court to conclude beyond reasonable doubt that she had been tortured or otherwise ill-treated prior to her death. The Court ordered Moscow to pay nearly 70,000 euros in damages to members of her family.

== See also ==
- Killing of Elza Kungayeva
- List of solved missing person cases (2000s)
- Mass graves in Chechnya
