= Sergey Lapin (police officer) =

Russian police officer

Sergei (Sergey) Lapin, also known by his radio communications call sign Kadet ("Cadet"), is a former Russian police officer who had served in Grozny, Chechnya as a Lieutenant in the OMON (special police detachment) from the Khanty–Mansi Autonomous Okrug. He has been convicted for the torture and "disappearance" of a Chechen student.

== Politkovskaya death threats investigations ==
In September 2001, journalist Anna Politkovskaya published an article in Novaya Gazeta newspaper called "The Disappearing People", in which she wrote about the allegations connecting Sergei Lapin and his OMON colleagues to the torture of Zelimkhan Murdalov. Following the publication of this article, Politkovskaya received two letters containing threats to her life, apparently written by Lapin. The Office of the Procurator of the city of Nizhnevartovsk in Khanty-Mansyski region opened a criminal investigation in October 2001 into Lapin’s involvement in threatening the safety of Politkovskaya and the investigation had been reportedly closed and renewed at least nine times.

On October 7, 2006 Anna Politkovskaya was shot dead in Moscow, bringing suspicions upon Lapin and his colleagues.

== Torture trials ==
In January 2002, Sergei Lapin was arrested and charged in connection with the allegations of torture of Zelimkhan Murdalov in detention. Lapin was released pending trial in May 2003 because he was found not to be threatening to the public safety. His trial began in Grozny at the end of 2003, and at first he reportedly has not attended any of the hearings because he claimed he suffered a mental illness. However, according to reports, he was first dismissed from OMON, but later reinstated as a police officer in the city of Nizhnevartovsk. Reportedly, Lapin was also awarded a medal "for protecting public order" accompanied by a letter signed by the President of Russia Vladimir Putin.

On March 29, 2005, in a rare ruling, court in Grozny found Lapin guilty of abusing authority and torturing Murdalov (including the use of electric shocks and dogs) and sentenced him to 11 years' imprisonment. On release, he will be banned from working for agencies under the MVD for three years. In addition, the court sent a special ruling to the head of the Khanty-Mansyski OMON, criticising the conduct of the OMON unit serving in Chechnya in broader terms. Another sentence, of 10.5 years in prison, was passed on him on November 27, 2007. In his last plea to the court, Lapin did not plead guilty and regretted that he had appeared for the trial in 2003. After Lapin's sentencing, several other Nizhnevartovsk policemen were also reportedly charged.

== See also ==
- Sergei Babin
