= Novye Aldi massacre =

Russian massacre of Chechens in 2000

- Part of the Second Chechen War
- Location of Novye-Aldy in Chechnya
- Location: Novye-Aldy, Groznensky District, Chechnya, Russia
- Date: February 5, 2000
- Target: Civilians
- Attack type: Mass murder, looting, arson, rape, robbery, massacre
- Deaths: 60–82
- Perpetrator: Russia

The Novye Aldi massacre was the mass murder of Chechen civilians on February 5, 2000, in which Russian forces went on a cleansing operation (zachistka), summarily executing dozens. The village had been cluster-bombed a day prior to the massacre, and local residents urged to come out for inspection the next day. Upon entering the village, Russian forces shot their victims with automatic fire at close range. The killings were accompanied by looting, rape, arson and robbery. As a result of the deadly rampage by Russian forces, up to 82 civilians were killed in the spree. Houses of civilians were burnt in an attempt to destroy evidence of summary executions and other crimes. Looting took place on a large scale and organised manner.

The official investigation into the Aldi massacre established that the "sweep operation" there was conducted by the paramilitary police of OMON from the northern Russian city of Saint Petersburg (possibly also from the southern Ryazan Oblast). As of 2016 the Russian authorities had failed to hold anyone to account for the crime. The guilt of the Russian state in the Aldi murders and the denial of justice to the victims was formally established in two different judgements by the European Court of Human Rights in 2006–07.

== Background ==
Novye Aldi (New Aldi) is a residential suburb to the south-west of the city and east of the villages of Alkhan-Yurt and Alkhan-Kala and the now-flattened Grozny oil refineries, next to the M-29 highway. Its population had been 27,000 people before the war, but most of the residents had fled the fighting in the last months of 1999, leaving behind approximately 2,000 people who were too old or otherwise incapable of the journey to safety. It appears that the suburb was not used by Chechen fighters in any way during the war and there are no reports of clashes with the Russian forces in Aldi. However, approximately 63 residents were killed between December 1999 and February 2000 by federal artillery and mortar fire in the course of the siege of the city. At least five of them died during the barrage of February 3–4 which included cluster bomb air strikes (among them three members of the ethnic Russian Smirnov family killed when their house was hit in the last hours of the bombardment). Aldi itself was not a target prior to February 3 and the casualties appear to have been inflicted by stray shells and rockets fired at neighboring areas such as District 20.

On February 4, after the bulk of the Chechen separatist forces had left Grozny, a delegation of Aldi village elders went under white flags to inform the Russian military command about the lack of a presence of Chechen fighters in the suburb. They had been fired on as they approached the federal military positions (one of them, an ethnic Russian, was injured in the shooting and later died), but eventually managed to successfully negotiate a cessation of the shelling. The initial Russian forces who had arrived in Aldi in the afternoon of February 4 (visibly battle-weary and typically very young conscript soldiers in dirty uniforms), did not encounter any resistance and passed through the settlement without committing any illegal acts. Indeed, they warned the villagers they had encountered extremely severe ("like beasts") troops coming behind them. They advised the civilians to leave the cellars but to not leave the relative safety of their homes, and to prepare their identity papers.

== Massacre ==
According to the June 2000 report by Human Rights Watch (HRW), based on reports of the fighting by the Russian human rights group Memorial (HRW has been denied direct access to Chechnya by the Russian authorities), the "mop-up" forces came in the morning of the next day (February 5) in multiple groups advancing from the northern edges towards the center of Aldi, likely numbering in excess of one hundred men along with several vehicles (BTR armoured personnel carriers, Ural trucks and UAZ minibuses). These new arrivals were much older than the conscripts. Many were drunk, often bearded and with shaven heads. They wore a variety of either military-green or police-grey camouflage uniforms with balaclava masks and headscarves. They were primarily members of Russia's heavily armed OMON riot police, apparently with a number of mercenary-like Russian short-term contract soldiers known as kontraktniki serving alongside or within the OMON detachments. A much smaller number of conscripts were also present. Conscript soldiers, according to Human Rights Watch, distinguished themselves in a number of incidents, either warning residents of the imminent danger or saving the lives of civilians by their active intervention.

After entering the settlement, ostensibly to check villagers' internal passports and to detain suspected fighters who had been left behind, groups of Russian riot police officers and contract soldiers began beating and randomly shooting civilians in their homes and in the streets. Most of the deadly violence took place along Matasha-Mazaeva Street, where at least 24 people were killed as the attackers went from house to house, executing civilians. The first murder there was committed at No. 170, resulting in the death of the house owner, 50-year-old Sultan Timirov. His body was found decapitated and torn into several pieces by multiple bullet wounds and other injuries (his head was never found and might have been blown off with a grenade fired from an underbarrel launcher). Most of the victims were middle-aged or elderly. The oldest victim was 82-year-old Rakat Akhmadova, who was gunned down at 162 Matasha-Mazayeva Street along with her 66-year-old cousin Gula Khaidayev and his 70-year-old neighbour Rizvan Umkhayev. Among other victims were an infant boy (one-year-old Khassan Estamirov, shot with at least two bullets to the head and then burned), at least six younger Chechen women (including the eight-months-pregnant 21-year-old Toita Estamirova, found with gunshot wounds to her stomach and chest), an elderly Russian woman (70-year-old Elena Kuznetsova, repeatedly shot in the face at point-blank range while leaving the cellar at 58 Second Tsimliansky Lane and then burned together with bodies of her Chechen neighbours, the Yakhiayevs) and a Ukrainian man (40-year-old Victor Shiptora, whose body was found in Khoperskaia Street).

The killings were often accompanied by demands for money or other valuables, which served as a pretext for execution if the amount proffered was insufficient; other victims were killed because they lacked identity papers. At least three men were detained and subsequently executed; one was also used as a human shield but later released. There were many incidents of Russian forces deliberately starting fires through the village, systematically torching civilian homes and property using canisters and bottles of flammable liquid, in particular where they found people with no identity papers. Some of this seemed to be a primitive attempt to destroy the evidence of civilian killings. In one incident, the arson itself appears to have been a murder attempt. The killers were looting houses and stealing jewelry and gold teeth from dead bodies. Numerous civilians were also beaten and threatened with death while being robbed. At least six women were reportedly gang-raped, including the subsequent strangling of three of them and the attempted murder of another. Some of the survivors were forced to plead for their lives, a number played dead after they were injured by gunfire. Others survived by fleeing and hiding, avoiding contact with OMON and the contract soldiers. After dark on February 5, when the Russian forces had left, the residents went through the streets of Aldi putting out fires and picking up dead bodies.

At least five people were murdered on this day in the nearby neighborhood of Chernorechie, an adjacent Grozny suburb linked with Aldi by a road through the large reservoir dam to the west. During the siege Chernorechie had been shelled much more heavily than Aldi and only a few people remained there during the events of February 5.

== Aftermath ==
The villagers collectively decided not to bury the bodies immediately (as demanded by Muslim tradition), but to instead keep the victims' bodies inside homes so their deaths could be documented. Following the massacre, Russian forces returned to Aldi on numerous occasions to loot and to threaten residents with reprisals should they speak out about what they witnessed. While there was some plunder on February 5, systematic pillage on a massive scale first took place during the following week, including on February 10 when OMON returned to Aldi in large numbers and began rounding-up any Chechen males they could find, taking away 16 of them along with whole truckloads of looted items. (They were later returned alive.)

The initial Russian investigations, including one which established the operation was undertaken by OMON units from the city of St. Petersburg and Ryazan province, had been accompanied by indignant public denial. Typical of this was the Russian military's reaction on February 24 to HRW's preliminary report on the killings, when a Russian Ministry of Defense spokesman declared that "these assertions are nothing but a concoction not supported by fact or any proof ... [and] should be seen as a provocation whose goal is to discredit the federal forces' operation against the terrorists in Chechnya". An eye-witness also said that investigators from the Federal Security Service told her the massacre was probably committed by Chechen fighters "disguised as federal troops". The residents expressed fear and mistrust of the Russian investigators in Aldi (three different teams on February 14 and 16 and on March 19), whose activities appeared to be an attempt to shift the blame on to the Chechen fighters and to intimidate the witnesses. Particularly frightening was the questioning as to whether they would recognize the perpetrators, which many regarded as a direct threat to their lives.

In spite of the weight of evidence and a host of enquiries by foreign and Russian journalists and by human rights organisations, no official investigation of the crime has ever been completed. For several years no-one had been charged in connection with the incident. This is not considered unusual, as a large number of civilians had been extrajudicially executed by federal forces in the course of the Chechen conflict and yet very few of the perpetrators have been brought to trial. Only in 2005 was one OMON officer, Sergei Babin, charged with the murder of an elderly resident of Aldi; however he then went into hiding and the case against him was suspended. As predicted by HRW in 2000, "the Russian government to date has shown a clear lack of political will to vigorously investigate and prosecute the perpetrators of the Aldi massacre" and until "an international commission is formed, with the ability to recommend prosecutions, there remains little likelihood of the guilty ever being punished."

In 2004, a previously unknown and allegedly Chechen Sufi group, Gazotan Murdash, claimed responsibility for the February 2004 Moscow Metro bombing which killed 40 people on the fourth anniversary of the Aldi killings. A statement signed by a man calling himself "Lom-Ali" called it an act of revenge. According to some media speculation, the bombing might have been the work of Musa Idigov, whose brother, also named Lom-Ali, had been killed in Aldi while shielding Musa from the blast of a hand grenade tossed into the cellar where they had been locked-in during the massacre. However, it is now widely believed that the bombing was organised by a Salafi militant group from the Russian republic of Karachay–Cherkessia.

== European Court judgments ==
In October 2006, in the case of Estamirov and Others v. Russia, (the killing of five members of the Estamirov family living in the house at 1 Podolskaia Street), the European Court of Human Rights (ECHR) found Russia guilty of serious human rights violations including indiscriminately targeting civilians and failing to adequately investigate their deaths. In July 2007, in the ruling in the case of Musayev, Labazanova and Magomadov v. Russia, the ECHR awarded damages to relatives of another 11 people killed in the massacre.

== Documentary ==
Aldy: A Past That Cannot Be Forgotten is a 2010 half-hour documentary film based on home video footage taken by the residents on February 9, 2000, and on eyewitness interviews recorded in January–February 2009 by members of the Memorial human rights center (including Natalia Estemirova, who was kidnapped by uniformed members of the security forces in Grozny on July 15, 2009, and executed on the same day in Ingushetia). The film can be viewed online on the Prague Watchdog website.

== See also ==
- Alkhan-Yurt massacre
- Bucha massacre
- List of massacres in Russia
- Russian war crimes
- Samashki massacre
- Staropromyslovski massacre
