= Khadzhi-Murat Yandiev =

Ingush insurgent

Khadzhi-Murat Aslanbekovich Yandiev
- Born: Khadzhi-Murat Aslanbekovich Yandiev; Russia
- Disappeared: February 2000 (age 25)
- Status: Missing for 26 years, 8 months and 27 days, Presumed Dead in 2006

Khadzhi-Murat Aslanbekovich Yandiev (Russian: Хаджи-Мурат Асланбекович Яндиев) was an Ingush insurgent fighter, who disappeared on February 2, 2000 after being filmed in the company of a Russian Army general who ordered him to be taken away and shot. To this date, his body has not been found.

== CNN footage ==
Khadzhi-Murat Yandiev was captured in a group of Chechen fighters sheltering in a hospital in the village of Alkhan-Kala, during the military siege of the Chechen capital Grozny.

What appears to be the execution order was caught on camera in the television footage recorded by journalists from CNN who were travelling with Russian forces along with representatives of several Russian television stations.

Yandiev, dressed in a Soviet-model military camouflage uniform, can be seen in the footage standing injured while Russian soldiers are kicking him and other Chechens in their wounded legs. With television cameras rolling, a top Russian military official then aggressively interrogates Yandiev before finally ordering his execution. Yandiev and the Russian quickly get into an argument, and the officer eventually shouts: "Take him away, damn it, finish him off there, shit, - that's the whole order. Get him out of here, damn it. Come on, come on, come on, do it, take him away, finish him off, shoot him, damn it..." Yandiev was then separated from the other prisoners and the soldiers led him away. He has not been seen since.

The officer in the footage, then General Alexander Baranov, has not been charged with any misconduct, and served as the chief commander of the North Caucasus Military District from July 2004 to May 2008. He was also since promoted to the rank of Colonel General and awarded with a title of the Hero of the Russian Federation.

== Mother's quest ==
According to his mother Fatima Bazorkina, her son's disappearance stemmed from a tragic misunderstanding. She said Khadzhi left university as soon as the Second Chechen War broke out in 1999 to search for his father, who he believed was besieged in Grozny but had actually left Chechnya to join Bazorkina at a relative's house in Ingushetia. Bazorkina said she never saw her son after August 1999.

Following Yandiev's disappearance, Bazorkina scoured the republic's mass graves and detention centers where Russian troops kept suspected fighters. After she saw the CNN footage of her son she appealed to prosecutors, who opened a criminal case in July 2001, 17 months after his disappearance. In February 2004 they closed it again, citing lack of evidence.

In 2006, Yandiev's mother sued Russia to the European Court of Human Rights (ECHR) for failing to adequately investigate the case. On July 27, 2006, in a landmark ruling, the Court has held Russian Federation responsible for the "disappearance" and presumed death of Khadzhi-Murat Yandiev. The court awarded Mrs Bazorkina €35,000 in damages and 12,241 euros for costs and expenses.

On May 15, 2007, the court had thrown out Russia's appeal of the ruling.

== See also ==
- List of people who disappeared mysteriously (2000–present)
